= List of urban-type settlements in Belarus =

This is a list of urban-type settlements in Belarus, which are a type of a populated place.

== Overview ==
According to a 1998 law of the Republic of Belarus, there are three categories of urban-type settlements in Belarus:

- Urban settlements (Belarusian: гарадскія пасёлкі; Russian: городские посёлки): with population over 2,000, industrial enterprises and developed residential infrastructure
- Resort settlements (Belarusian: курортныя пасёлкі; Russian: курортные посёлки, resort towns): with population of at least 2,000, sanatoriums, resorts or other health recuperation establishments, and developed residential infrastructure
- Worker settlements (Belarusian: рабочыя пасёлкі; Russian: рабочие посёлки): with population at least 500, servicing industrial enterprises, construction sites, railroad stations, electric stations, or other industrial objects.

The notion of urban-type settlement is inherited from the period of the Byelorussian SSR within the Soviet Union. Before the Soviet era, many modern urban settlements in Belarus were classified as miastechka/miasteczko ("market town").

== List ==
As of the 2009 Belarusian census, there were 94 urban-type settlements, including 83 urban settlements, one resort settlement, and ten worker settlements. By January 1, 2016, there were 90 urban-type settlements, including 81 urban settlements, one resort settlement and eight worker settlements.

Urban-type settlements in Belarus
Coat of arms	Urban-type settlement	Belarusian	Russian	Status	District	Region	2009 census	2016 estimate	Change
	Aktsyabrski	Акцябрскі	Октябрьский	urban settlement	Aktsyabrski	Gomel	7,367	6,753	−8,33%
	Antopal	Антопаль	Антополь	urban settlement	Drahichyn	Brest	1,687	1,417	−16,00%
	Arekhawsk	Арэхаўск	Ореховск	urban settlement	Orsha	Vitebsk	2,755	2,402	−12,81%
	Astryna	Астрына	Острино	urban settlement	Shchuchyn	Grodno	2,064	1,778	−13,86%
	Asvyeya	Асвея	Освея	urban settlement	Verkhnyadzvinsk	Vitebsk	1,325	1,206	−8,98%
	Azarychy	Азарычы	Озаричи	urban settlement	Kalinkavichy	Gomel	1,340	1,159	−13,51%
	Bahushewsk	Багушэўск	Богушевск	urban settlement	Syanno	Vitebsk	3,133	2,598	−17,08%
	Balbasava	Балбасава	Болбасово	urban settlement	Orsha	Vitebsk	3,656	3,529	−3,47%
	Balshavik	Бальшавік	Большевик	worker settlement	Gomel	Gomel	2,518	2,502	−0,64%
	Byahoml	Бягомль	Бегомль	urban settlement	Dokshytsy	Vitebsk	2,736	2,630	−3,87%
	Beshankovichy	Бешанковічы	Бешенковичи	urban settlement	Beshankovichy	Vitebsk	7,344	6,701	−8,76%
	Bobr	Бобр	Бобр	urban settlement	Krupki	Minsk	1,118	957	−14,40%
	Brahin	Брагін	Брагин	urban settlement	Brahin	Gomel	3,954	3,698	−6,47%
	Khalopyenichy	Халопенічы	Холопеничи	urban settlement	Krupki	Minsk	1,495	1,385	−7,36%
	Khotsimsk	Хоцімск	Хотимск	urban settlement	Khotsimsk	Mogilev	7,084	6,447	−8,99%
	Tsyelyakhany	Целяханы	Телеханы	urban settlement	Ivatsevichy	Brest	4,198	3,959	−5,69%
	Tsyerakhowka	Церахоўка	Тереховка	urban settlement	Dobrush	Gomel	1,821	3,128	+71,77%
	Chyrvonaya Slabada	Чырвоная Слабада	Красная Слобода	urban settlement	Salihorsk	Minsk	4,304	3,909	−9,18%
	Damachava	Дамачава	Домачево	urban settlement	Brest	Brest	1,305	1,221	−6,44%
	Drybin	Дрыбін	Дрибин	urban settlement	Drybin	Mogilev	3,298	3,031	−8,10%
	Haradzyeya	Гарадзея	Городея	urban settlement	Nyasvizh	Minsk	4,099	3,802	−7,25%
	Haradzischa	Гарадзішча	Городище	urban settlement	Baranavichy	Brest	2,219	2,040	−8,07%
	Hlusk	Глуск	Глуск	urban settlement	Hlusk	Mogilev	7,402	7,233	−2,28%
	Ivyanyets	Івянец	Ивенец	urban settlement	Valozhyn	Minsk	4,320	4,178	−3,29%
	Yalizava	Ялізава	Елизово	worker settlement	Asipovichy	Mogilev	2,672	2,491	−6,77%
	Yanavichy	Янавічы	Яновичи	urban settlement	Vitebsk	Vitebsk	929	765	−17,65%
	Yezyaryshcha	Езярышча	Езерище	urban settlement	Haradok	Vitebsk	1,575	1,280	−18,73%
	Yuratsishki	Юрацішкі	Юратишки	urban settlement	Iwye	Grodno	1,501	1,341	−10,66%
	Kamaryn	Камарын	Комарин	urban settlement	Brahin	Gomel	2,051	1,804	−12,04%
	Kapatkyevichy	Капаткевічы	Копаткевичи	urban settlement	Pyetrykaw	Gomel	3,415	2,960	−13,32%
	Karelichy	Карэлічы	Кореличи	urban settlement	Karelichy	Grodno	6,854	6,528	−4,76%
	Karma	Карма	Корма	urban settlement	Karma	Gomel	7,448	7,610	+2,18%
	Kazlowshchyna	Казлоўшчына	Козловщина	urban settlement	Dzyatlava	Grodno	1,847	1,673	−9,42%
	Kokhanava	Коханава	Коханово	urban settlement	Talachyn	Vitebsk	4,327	4,231	−2,22%
	Kopys	Копысь	Копысь	urban settlement	Orsha	Vitebsk	910	850	−6,59%
	Krasnapollye	Краснаполле	Краснополье	urban settlement	Krasnapollye	Mogilev	6,123	5,844	−4,56%
	Krasnasyelski	Краснасельскі	Красносельский	urban settlement	Vawkavysk	Grodno	6,885	6,744	−2,05%
	Kryvichy	Крывічы	Кривичи	urban settlement	Myadzyel	Minsk	1,298	1,232	−5,08%
	Lahishyn	Лагішын	Логишин	urban settlement	Pinsk	Brest	2,372	2,022	−14,76%
	Lyelchytsy	Лельчыцы	Лельчицы	urban settlement	Lyelchytsy	Gomel	10,606	11,310	+6,64%
	Lyubcha	Любча	Любча	urban settlement	Novogrudok	Grodno	1,157	1,059	−8,47%
	Loyew	Лоеў	Лоев	urban settlement	Loyew	Gomel	7,022	6,733	−4,12%
	Lyntupy	Лынтупы	Лынтупы	urban settlement	Pastavy	Vitebsk	1,609	1,519	−5,59%
	Lyozna	Лёзна	Лиозно	urban settlement	Lyozna	Vitebsk	6,766	6,688	−1,15%
	Machulishchy	Мачулішчы	Мачулищи	urban settlement	Minsk	Minsk	7,378	8,315	+12,70%
	Mir	Мір	Мир	urban settlement	Karelichy	Grodno	2,310	2,250	−2,60%
	Narach	Нарач	Нарочь	resort settlement	Myadzyel	Minsk	2,931	3,481	+18,76%
	Navayelnya	Наваельня	Новоельня	urban settlement	Dzyatlava	Grodno	3,041	2,700	−11,21%
	Obal	Обаль	Оболь	urban settlement	Shumilina	Vitebsk	2,687	2,395	−10,87%
	Padsvillye	Падсвілле	Подсвилье	urban settlement	Hlybokaye	Vitebsk	2,270	1,965	−13,44%
	Parychy	Парычы	Паричи	urban settlement	Svyetlahorsk	Gomel	2,109	1,833	−13,09%
	Plyeshchanitsy	Плешчаніцы	Плещеницы	urban settlement	Lahoysk	Minsk	6,041	5,835	−3,41%
	Porazava	Поразава	Порозово	urban settlement	Svislach	Grodno	1,119	913	−18,41%
	Prawdzinski	Праўдзінскі	Правдинский	worker settlement	Pukhavichy	Minsk	2,408	2,288	−4,98%
	Radashkovichy	Радашковічы	Радошковичи	urban settlement	Maladzyechna	Minsk	5,518	5,789	+4,91%
	Radun	Радунь	Радунь	urban settlement	Voranava	Grodno	2,673	2,355	−11,90%
	Rasony	Расоны	Россоны	urban settlement	Rasony	Vitebsk	5,409	4,946	−8,56%
	Rechytsa	Рэчыца	Речица	worker settlement	Stolin	Brest	6,280	6,096	−2,93%
	Ros	Рось	Россь	urban settlement	Vawkavysk	Grodno	5,391	4,705	−12,72%
	Rudzyensk	Рудзенск	Руденск	urban settlement	Pukhavichy	Minsk	2,806	2,725	−2,89%
	Ruzhany	Ружаны	Ружаны	urban settlement	Pruzhany	Brest	3,153	3,006	−4,66%
	Sapotskin	Сапоцкін	Сопоцкин	urban settlement	Grodno	Grodno	1,231	1,003	−18,52%
	Sasnovy Bor	Сасновы Бор	Сосновый Бор	worker settlement	Svyetlahorsk	Gomel	2,423	2,086	−13,91%
	Smilavichy	Смілавічы	Смиловичи	urban settlement	Chervyen	Minsk	4,654	5,212	+11,99%
	Starobin	Старобін	Старобин	urban settlement	Salihorsk	Minsk	5,568	6,055	+8,75%
	Streshyn	Стрэшын	Стрешин	urban settlement	Zhlobin	Gomel	1,263	1,226	−2,93%
	Surazh	Сураж	Сураж	urban settlement	Vitebsk	Vitebsk	1,039	818	−21,27%
	Svir	Свір	Свирь	urban settlement	Myadzyel	Minsk	1,055	909	−13,84%
	Svislach	Свіслач	Свислочь	urban settlement	Pukhavichy	Minsk	3,920	3,921	+0,03%
	Sharashova	Шарашова	Шерешёво	urban settlement	Pruzhany	Brest	1,889	1,782	−5,66%
	Sharkawshchyna	Шаркаўшчына	Шарковщина	urban settlement	Sharkawshchyna	Vitebsk	6,934	6,424	−7,36%
	Shumilina	Шуміліна	Шумилино	urban settlement	Shumilina	Vitebsk	7,506	7,437	−0,92%
	Tatarka	Татарка	Татарка	worker settlement	Asipovichy	Mogilev	771	720	−6,61%
	Urechcha	Урэчча	Уречье	urban settlement	Lyuban	Minsk	3,168	2,959	−6,60%
	Ushachy	Ушачы	Ушачи	urban settlement	Ushachy	Vitebsk	5,514	6,030	+9,36%
	Uvaravichy	Уваравічы	Уваровичи	urban settlement	Buda-Kashalyova	Gomel	2,563	2,307	−9,99%
	Varapayeva	Варапаева	Воропаево	urban settlement	Pastavy	Vitebsk	2,857	2,571	−10,01%
	Vyalikaya Byerastavitsa	Вялікая Бераставіца	Большая Берестовица	urban settlement	Byerastavitsa	Grodno	5,720	5,545	−3,06%
	Vidzy	Відзы	Видзы	urban settlement	Braslaw	Vitebsk	1,763	1,670	−5,28%
	Vyetryna	Ветрына	Ветрино	urban settlement	Polotsk	Vitebsk	2,725	2,220	−18,53%
	Voranava	Воранава	Вороново	urban settlement	Voranava	Grodno	6,332	6,434	+1,61%
	Zarechcha	Зарэчча	Заречье	urban settlement	Rechytsa	Gomel	2,447	2,242	−8,38%
	Zelva	Зэльва	Зельва	urban settlement	Zelva	Grodno	7,396	6,906	−6,63%
	Zyalyony Bor	Зялёны Бор	Зелёный Бор	worker settlement	Smalyavichy	Minsk	1,142	1,116	−2,28%
	Zhaludok	Жалудок	Желудок	urban settlement	Shchuchyn	Grodno	1,290	1,017	−21,16%
