= Krasnasyelski =

Urban-type settlement in Grodno Region, Belarus

Krasnasyelski Краснасельскі (Belarusian) Красносельский (Russian)
- Urban-type settlement
- Flag Coat of arms

- Location within Belarus
- Coordinates: 53°16′44″N 24°25′01″E
- Country: Belarus
- Region: Grodno Region
- District: Vawkavysk District

Population (2025)
  - Total: 5,635
- Time zone: UTC+3 (MSK)

Krasnasyelski (Belarusian: Краснасельскі, romanized: Krasnasieĺski; Russian: Красносельский, romanized: Krasnoselsky) is an urban-type settlement in Vawkavysk District, Grodno Region, Belarus. As of 2025, it has a population of 5,635.
