= Parychy =

Parychy Парычы (Belarusian) Паричи (Russian)
- Urban-type settlement
- Location within Belarus
- Coordinates: 52°48′10″N 29°25′09″E
- Country: Belarus
- Region: Gomel Region
- District: Svyetlahorsk District
- First mentioned: 1639

Population (2025)
  - Total: 1,783
- Time zone: UTC+3 (MSK)
- Postal code: 247413
- Area code: +375-2342

Parychy (Belarusian: Парычы, romanized: Paryčy; Russian: Паричи, romanized: Parichi) is an urban-type settlement in Svyetlahorsk District, Gomel Region, Belarus. It serves as the administrative center of Parychy selsoviet. As of 2025, it has a population of 1,783.

== Geography ==
Parychy is situated on the Berezina River, some 29 kilometres (18 mi) north-west of Svyetlahorsk, 40 kilometres (25 mi) south-east of Babruysk and 114 kilometres (71 mi) north-west of Gomel.

== History ==
The village became part of the Russian Empire after the Second Partition of Poland in 1793.

The settlement was captured by the Wehrmacht on 5 July 1941, and the important Jewish community, some 1,700 people, was exterminated in the following years. The settlement was liberated on 26 June 1944, during the Bobruysk offensive.
