= Padsvillye =

Urban-type settlement in Vitebsk Region, Belarus

Padsvillye Падсвілле (Belarusian) Подсвилье (Russian)
- Urban-type settlement
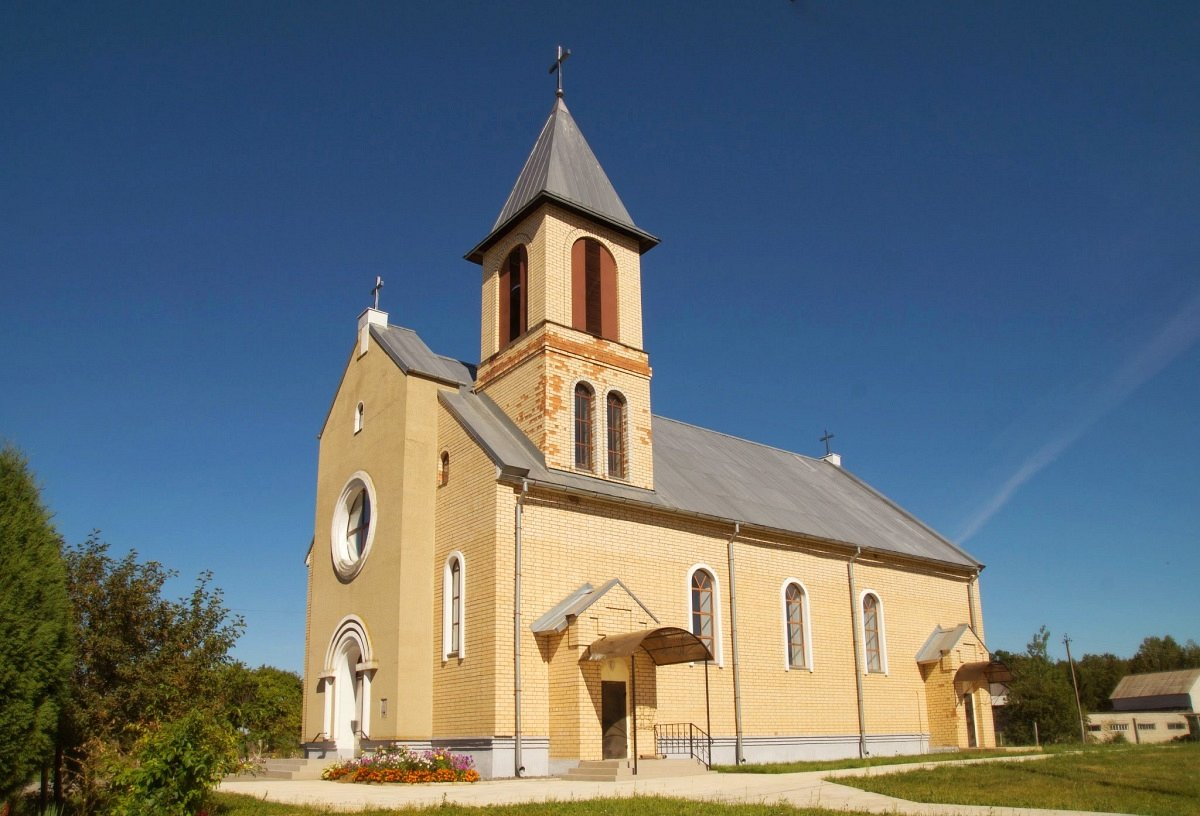
- Sacred Heart church

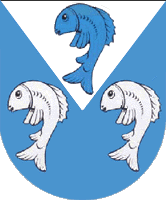
- Coat of arms

- Location within Belarus
- Coordinates: 55°08′50″N 27°58′38″E
- Country: Belarus
- Region: Vitebsk Region
- District: Hlybokaye District

Population (2025)
  - Total: 1,648
- Time zone: UTC+3 (MSK)

Padsvillye (Belarusian: Падсвілле, romanized: Padsvillie; Russian: Подсвилье, romanized: Podsvilye) is an urban-type settlement in Hlybokaye District, Vitebsk Region, in northern Belarus. As of 2025, it has a population of 1,648.

== History ==
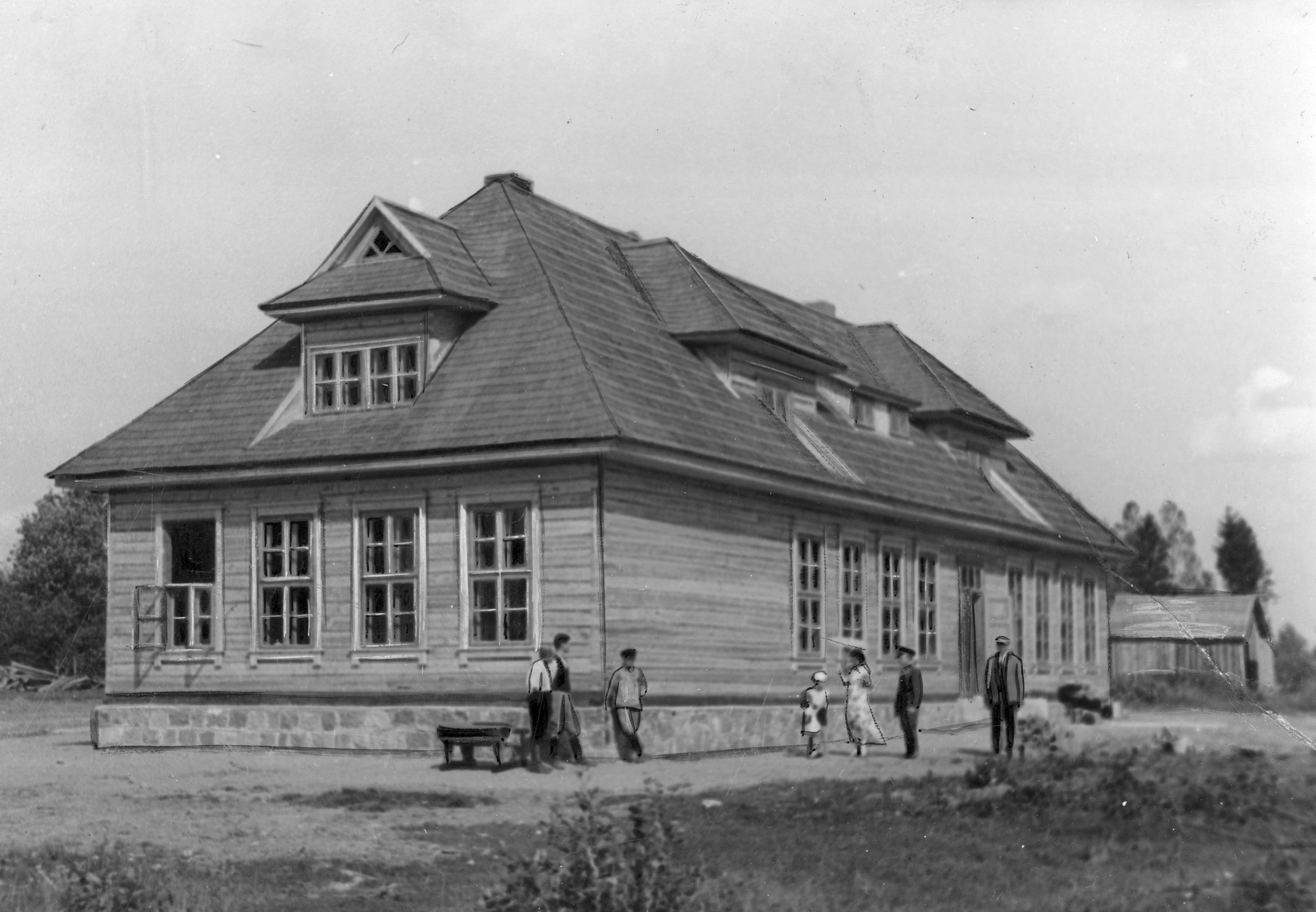
School in Podświle in 1935

Podświle, as it was known in Polish, was part of Poland in the interwar period. According to the 1921 census, the population was 44.4% Belarusian, 43.2% Polish, and 12.3% Jewish.

During World War II, the town was first occupied by the Soviet Union until 1941, then by Nazi Germany until 1944, and re-occupied by the Soviet Union afterwards, which eventually annexed it from Poland in 1945.
