= Sharashova =

Urban-type settlement in Brest Region, Belarus

Sharashova Шарашова (Belarusian) Шерешево (Russian)
- Urban-type settlement
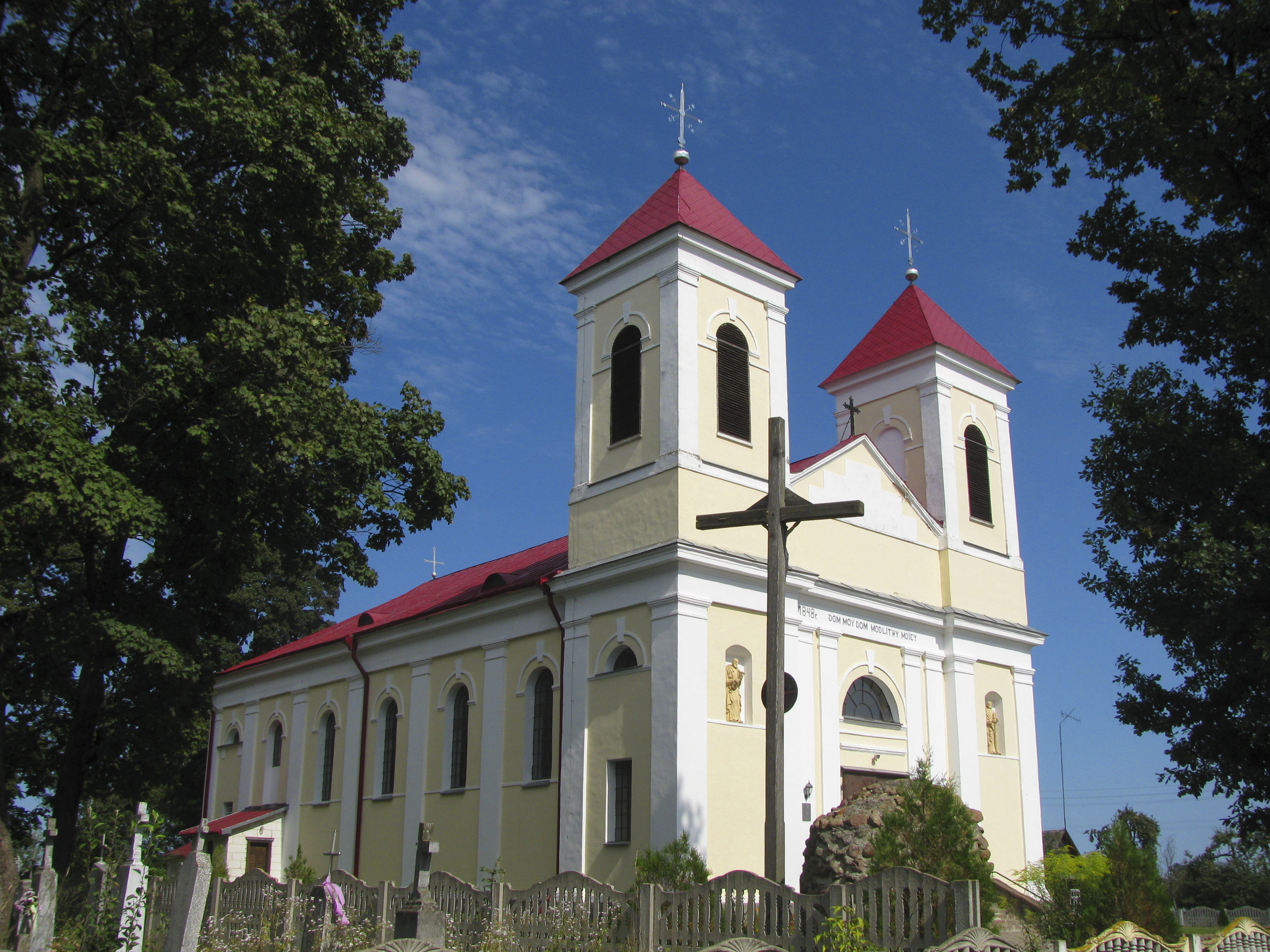

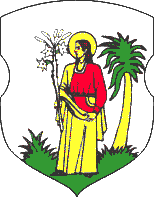
- Coat of arms

- Location within Belarus
- Coordinates: 52°33′N 24°13′E
- Country: Belarus
- Region: Brest Region
- District: Pruzhany District

Population (2025)
  - Total: 1,406
- Time zone: UTC+3 (MSK)

Sharashova (Belarusian: Шарашова, Шарашэва, romanized: Šarašova, Šaraševa, local pronunciation:
[ʃereˈʃɔwɔ]; Russian: Шерешево, romanized: Shereshevo, Polish: Szereszów) is an urban-type settlement in Pruzhany District, Brest Region, Belarus. It serves as the administrative center of Sharashova selsoviet. Sharashova is situated 14 kilometres (8.7 mi) from Pruzhany. As of 2025, it has a population of 1,406.

== History ==
During the Livonian War, Sharashova was a gathering point for Polish–Lithuanian troops in 1578 against Ivan IV of Russia after he had occupied Livonia.

In the 1790s, Sharashova had an estimated population of 3,360. At the 1897 census of the Russian Empire, the settlement had a population of 5,079.

== Sources ==
- "Шерешево" . Brockhaus and Efron Encyclopedic Dictionary (in Russian). 1906.
