= Zarechcha, Rechytsa district, Gomel region =

Urban-type settlement in Gomel Region, Belarus

Zarechcha Зарэчча (Belarusian) Заречье (Russian)
- Urban-type settlement
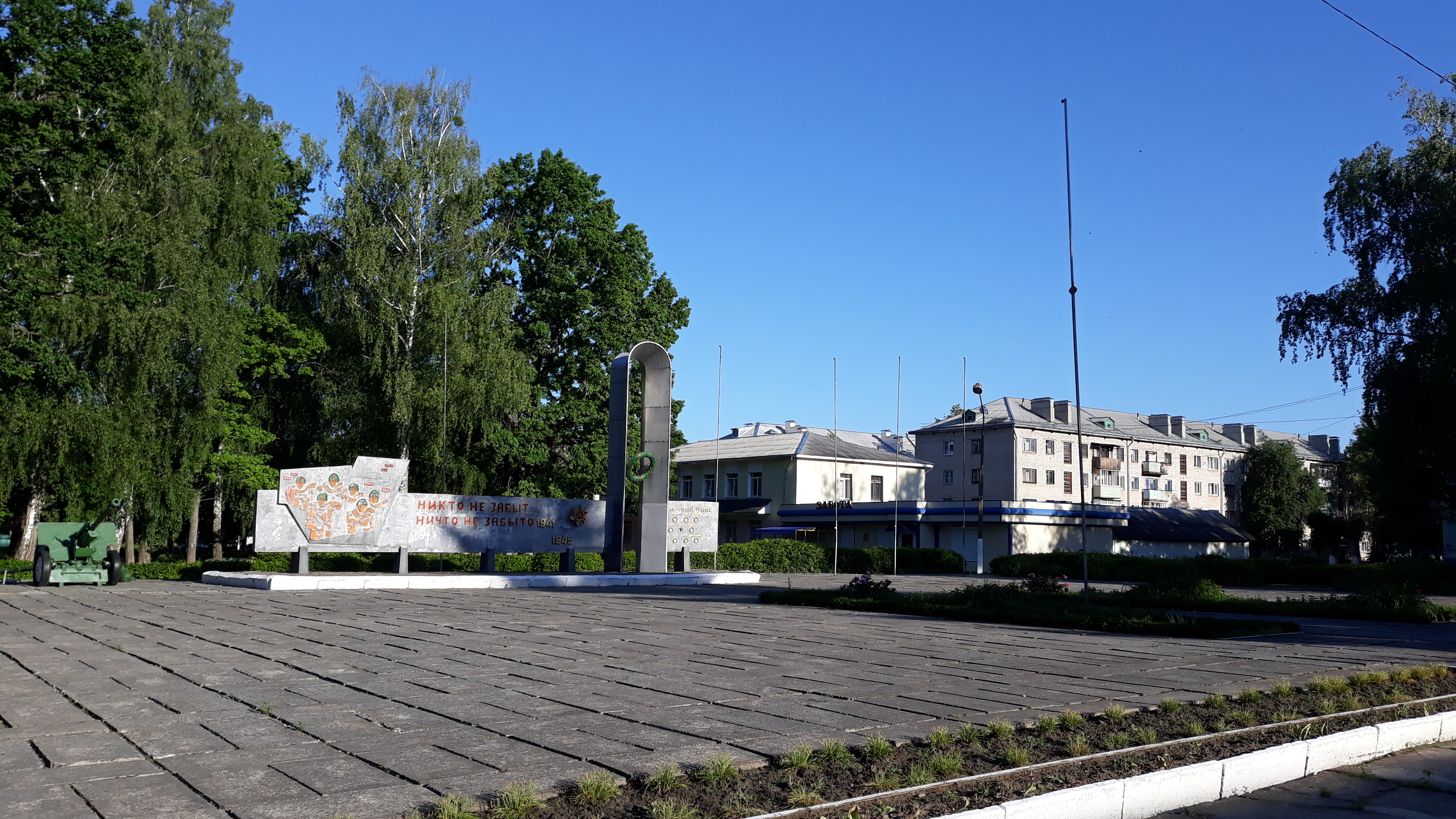

- Location within Belarus
- Coordinates: 52°26′N 30°05′E
- Country: Belarus
- Region: Gomel Region
- District: Rechytsa District

Population (2025)
  - Total: 1,984
- Time zone: UTC+3 (MSK)

Zarechcha (Belarusian: Зарэчча, romanized: Zarečča; Russian: Заречье, romanized: Zarechye) is an urban-type settlement in Rechytsa District, Gomel Region, Belarus. As of 2025, it has a population of 1,984.
