= Sasnovy Bor, Gomel region =

Urban-type settlement in Gomel Region, Belarus

Sasnovy Bor Сасновы Бор (Belarusian) Сосновый Бор (Russian)
- Urban-type settlement
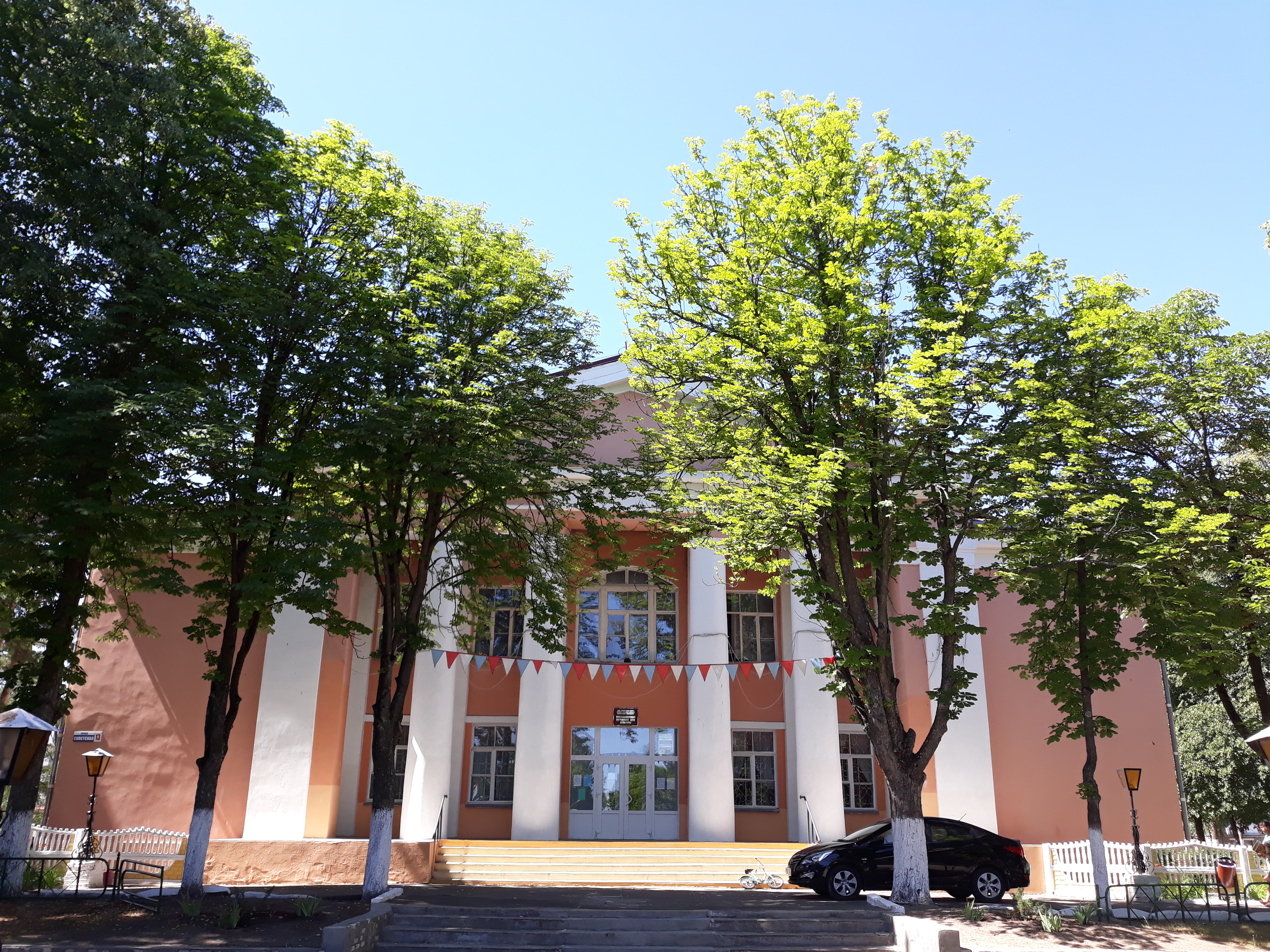

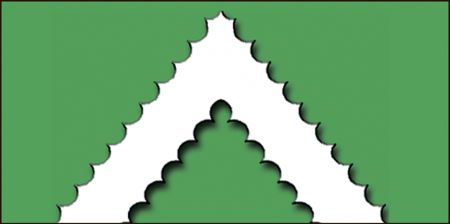
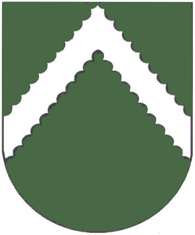
- Flag Coat of arms

- Location within Belarus
- Coordinates: 52°31′03″N 29°36′05″E
- Country: Belarus
- Region: Gomel Region
- District: Svyetlahorsk District

Population (2025)
  - Total: 1,802
- Time zone: UTC+3 (MSK)

Sasnovy Bor (Belarusian: Сасновы Бор; Russian: Сосновый Бор, romanized: Sosnovy Bor) is an urban-type settlement (a work settlement) in Svyetlahorsk District, Gomel Region, Belarus. As of 2025, it has a population of 1,802.
