= Balshavik, Gomel region =

Urban-type settlement in Gomel Region, Belarus

Balshavik Бальшавік (Belarusian) Большевик (Russian)
- Urban-type settlement
- Location within Belarus
- Coordinates: 52°33′46″N 30°52′42″E
- Country: Belarus
- Region: Gomel Region
- District: Gomel District

Population (2025)
  - Total: 2,795
- Time zone: UTC+3 (MSK)

Balshavik (Belarusian: Бальшавік, romanized: Baĺšavik; Russian: Большевик, romanized: Bolshevik) is an urban-type settlement (a work settlement) in Gomel District, Gomel Region, Belarus. As of 2025, it has a population of 2,795.
