= Rechytsa (disambiguation) =

Rechytsa is a town and the administrative center of Rechytsa District in Gomel Region, Belarus.

Rechytsa may also refer to:

- Rechytsa, Cherykaw District, a village in Cherykaw District, Mogilev Region, Belarus
- Rechytsa, Kamyenyets District, a village in Kamyenyets District, Brest Region, Belarus
- Rechytsa, Kobryn District, a village in Kobryn District, Brest Region, Belarus
- Rechytsa, Polotsk District, a village in Polotsk District, Vitebsk Region, Belarus
- Rechytsa, Stolin District, a work settlement in Stolin District, Brest Region, Belarus
- Rechytsa, Uzda District, a village in Uzda District, Minsk Region, Belarus
