= Balbasava =

Urban-type settlement in Vitebsk Region, Belarus

Balbasava Балбасава (Belarusian) Болбасово (Russian)
- Urban-type settlement
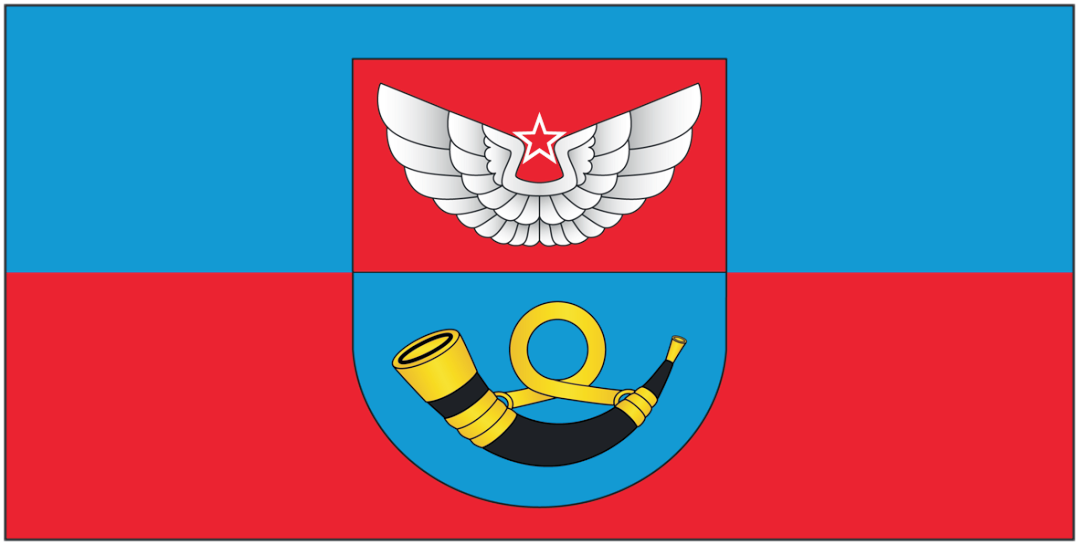
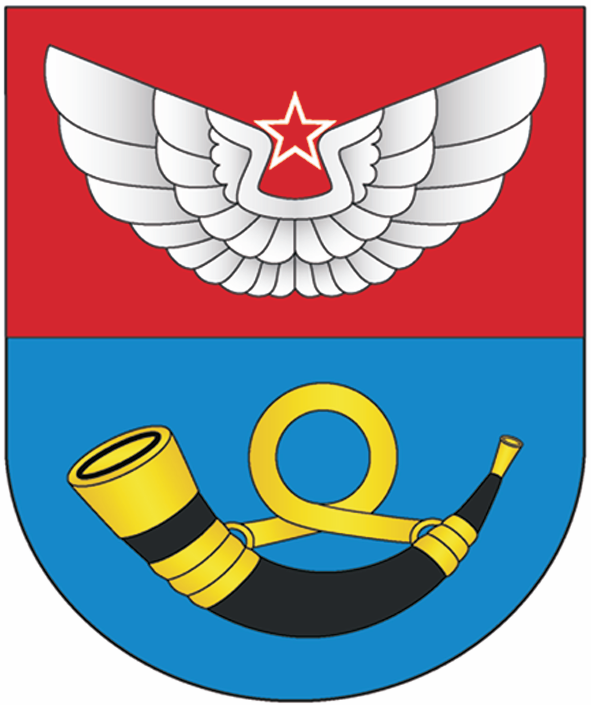
- Flag Coat of arms

- Location within Belarus
- Coordinates: 54°25′19″N 30°17′24″E
- Country: Belarus
- Region: Vitebsk Region
- District: Orsha District

Population (2025)
  - Total: 3,230
- Time zone: UTC+3 (MSK)

Balbasava (Belarusian: Балбасава; Russian: Болбасово, romanized: Bolbasovo) is an urban-type settlement in Orsha District, Vitebsk Region, Belarus. As of 2025, it has a population of 3,230.
