= 14th Infantry Division (Wehrmacht) =

14th Infantry Division 14th Motorized Infantry Division
- 14. Infanterie-Division; 14. Infanterie-Division (mot.)
- Unit insignia
- Active: 1 October 1934 – 8 May 1945
- Country: Nazi Germany
- Branch: German Army
- Type: Infantry; Motorized infantry
- Size: Division
- Garrison/HQ: Leipzig
- Nickname: Sächsische Division
- Engagements: World War II

Commanders
- Notable commanders: Lothar Rendulic

The 14th Infantry Division (German: 14. Infanterie-Division; nickname: the Sächsische Division or Saxonian Division) was a formation of the Germany Army (Wehrmacht) which fought during World War II.

== History and Organisation ==
The division was formed in 1934 in Leipzig, by expanding the 11th (Saxonian) Infantry Regiment of the 4th Division of the old Reichswehr. As this was a direct breach of the terms of the Treaty of Versailles, its existence was initially concealed; it was formally designated as the 14th Infantry Division in October 1935. This history, particularly of Infantry Regiment 11, made it one of the prestige infantry divisions of the Wehrmacht.

Mobilised in the 1st wave in 1939, the division was involved in the German invasion of Poland, where it attacked towards Częstochowa and Lublin, and the following year's invasion of France. In October 1940 it was 'motorised', i.e. provided with motor transport as opposed to the usual horse and foot mobility of Wehrmacht infantry divisions, as the 14. Infanteriedivision (mot.), with the following organisation:

- Infanterie-Regiment 11 (mot.)
- Infanterie-Regiment 53 (mot.)
- Artillerie-Regiment 14 (mot.)
- Kradschützen-Abteilung 54
- Divisionstruppen 14

During Operation Barbarossa, the division was involved in the encirclement of Minsk. In the winter of 1942/3 it was intended to reform the division as the 14th Panzergrenadier Division, but this process was stopped; in 1943 the formation was changed, having the following organisation:

- Infanterie-Regiment 11
- Infanterie-Regiment 53
- Infanterie-Regiment 101
- Artillerie-Regiment 14
- Füsilier-Bataillon 14
- Kradschützen-Bataillon 54
- Divisionstruppen 14

During this period the 14th Infantry Division was mostly assigned to Ninth Army, with Army Group Centre on the Eastern Front; it suffered heavy losses during the Battles of Rzhev, and then in the defence against Operation Suvorov.

1944 saw the division transferred to 3rd Panzer Army. In the summer of 1944 it was one of Army Group Centre's few reserve formations, and in this capacity was rushed into the line near Orekhovsk on 25 June in a desperate attempt to hold back the breakthrough of several Soviet divisions at Orsha during the Soviet summer offensive, Operation Bagration. Some elements made a last stand around Bogushevsk before being overwhelmed; Infantry Regiment 11 was left as a rearguard on the road to Minsk. Only a handful of troops were able to retreat to the German lines.

By the end of the year the remainders of the formation had been transferred to Second Army and was in the area of Ostrolenka, Poland; during the Soviet East Prussian Offensive of January 1945, the rebuilt 14th was one of the divisions pushed north and trapped in the Heiligenbeil pocket, where it attempted a breakout near Wormditt, before falling back on Braunsberg. The division was eventually destroyed in fighting in the kessel, most of its surviving troops entering Soviet captivity, while a few were evacuated via the Frisches Haff.

== Commanders ==
- Lieutenant-General Peter Weyer (1 September 1939)
- Major-General Lothar Rendulic (15 June 1940)
- Lieutenant-General Friedrich Fürst (6 October 1940)
- Lieutenant-General Heinrich Wosch (1 June 1942)
- Lieutenant-General Walther Krause (1 October 1942)
- Lieutenant-General Rudolf Holste (1 January 1943)
- Lieutenant-General Hermann Flörke (15 May 1943)
- Lieutenant-General Erich Schneider (15 December 1944)
- Major-General Paul von Below (? 1945)
- Colonel Kirch (? 1945)
- Major-General Werner Schulze (March - April 1945)

== See also ==
- List of German divisions in World War II
