= Rechytsa district =

District of Gomel region, Belarus

Coordinates: 52°21′50″N 30°23′41″E

Rechytsa district Рэчыцкі раён (Belarusian) Речицкий район (Russian)
- District
- Flag Coat of arms

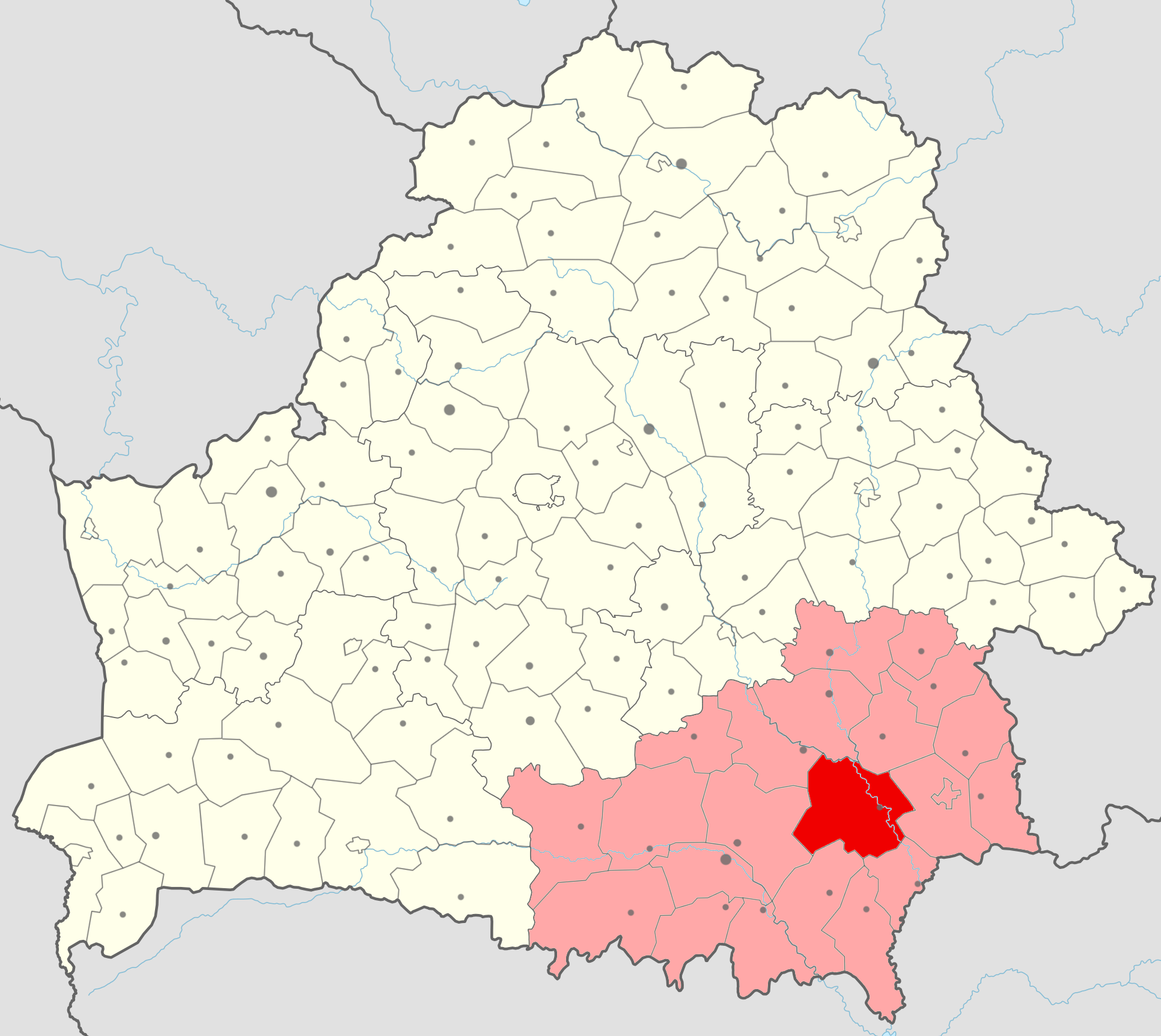
- Country: Belarus
- Region: Gomel
- Seat: Rechytsa

Area
  - Total: 2,721 km^{2} (1,051 sq mi)

Population (2024)
  - Total: 94,749
  - Density: 34.82/km^{2} (90.19/sq mi)
- Time zone: UTC+3 (MSK)

Rechytsa district or Rečyca district (Belarusian: Рэчыцкі раён, romanized: Rečycki rajon; Russian: Речицкий район) is a district (raion) in the Gomel region of Belarus. It is situated in the southeastern part of the country on the banks of Dnieper River. The largest city and administrative center is Rechytsa. As of 2024, it had a population of 94,749 inhabitants, and was the second most populous raion in the district.

== History ==
The first records of the name of the region is from the 11th century CE. It is mentioned as a settlement in Valyn in the 12th century, and later as a part of the Principality of Chernigov. It came under the control of Gediminas, the Grand Duke of Lithuania in the early 14th century. Later during the region of Vitaut of the Grand Duchy, the region was fortified and the Rechytsa castle was built. In 1566, the administrative district of Rechytsa was established with Rechytsa as the center.

In 1603, English explorer John Smith described the region as wealthy and consisting of a heavy fortress, and several buildings. The region was involved in trading with other regions such as the Ottoman Empire, with the Dnieper River used for transporting goods. In the mid 17th century, the region was attacked by the Cossacks, who destroyed the castle. In the late 19th century, the population of the region reached close to ten thousand people. In 1964, oil deposits were discovered in the region, and an oil refinery was established.

== Geography ==
Rechytsa district is one of the 21 districts in the Gomel region of Belarus. Its administrative center is Rechytsa. It is located in southeastern Belarus on the banks of Dnieper River. It borders the districts of Svyetlahorsk, Gomel, Loyew, Buda-Kashalyova, Khoiniki, Kalinkavichy, and Zhlobin in the Gomel oblast.

== Demographics ==
As of 2024, it had a population of 94,749 inhabitants, and was the second most populous raion in the district. The region had a considerable Jewish population since the 17th century.

Notable residents include traveler Vladimir Yarets, and former Belarusian minister Yury Zacharanka.
