= Lahishyn =

Urban-type settlement in Brest Region, Belarus

Lahishyn Лагішын (Belarusian) Логишин (Russian)
- Urban-type settlement
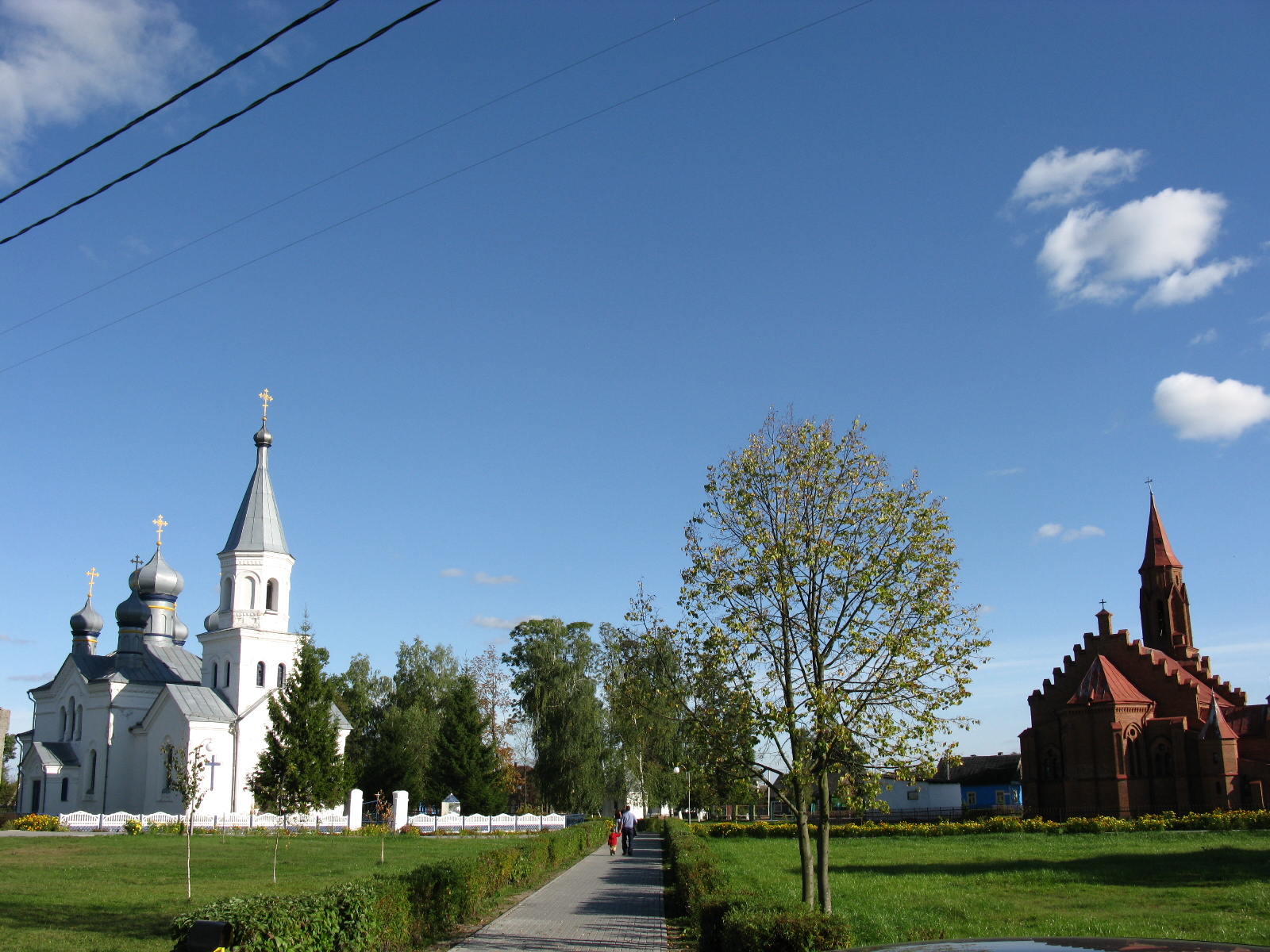

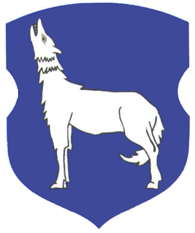
- Coat of arms

- Location within Belarus
- Coordinates: 52°20′N 25°59′E
- Country: Belarus
- Region: Brest Region
- District: Pinsk District

Population (2026)
  - Total: 1,721
- Time zone: UTC+3 (MSK)

Lahishyn or Logishin (Note: Belarusian: Лагішын, romanized: Lahišyn, local pronunciation: [loˈɦɪʃɪn]; Russian: Логишин, romanized: Logishin; Polish: Łohiszyn.) is an urban-type settlement in Pinsk District, Brest Region, in southern Belarus. As of 2026, it has a population of 1,721.

== History ==
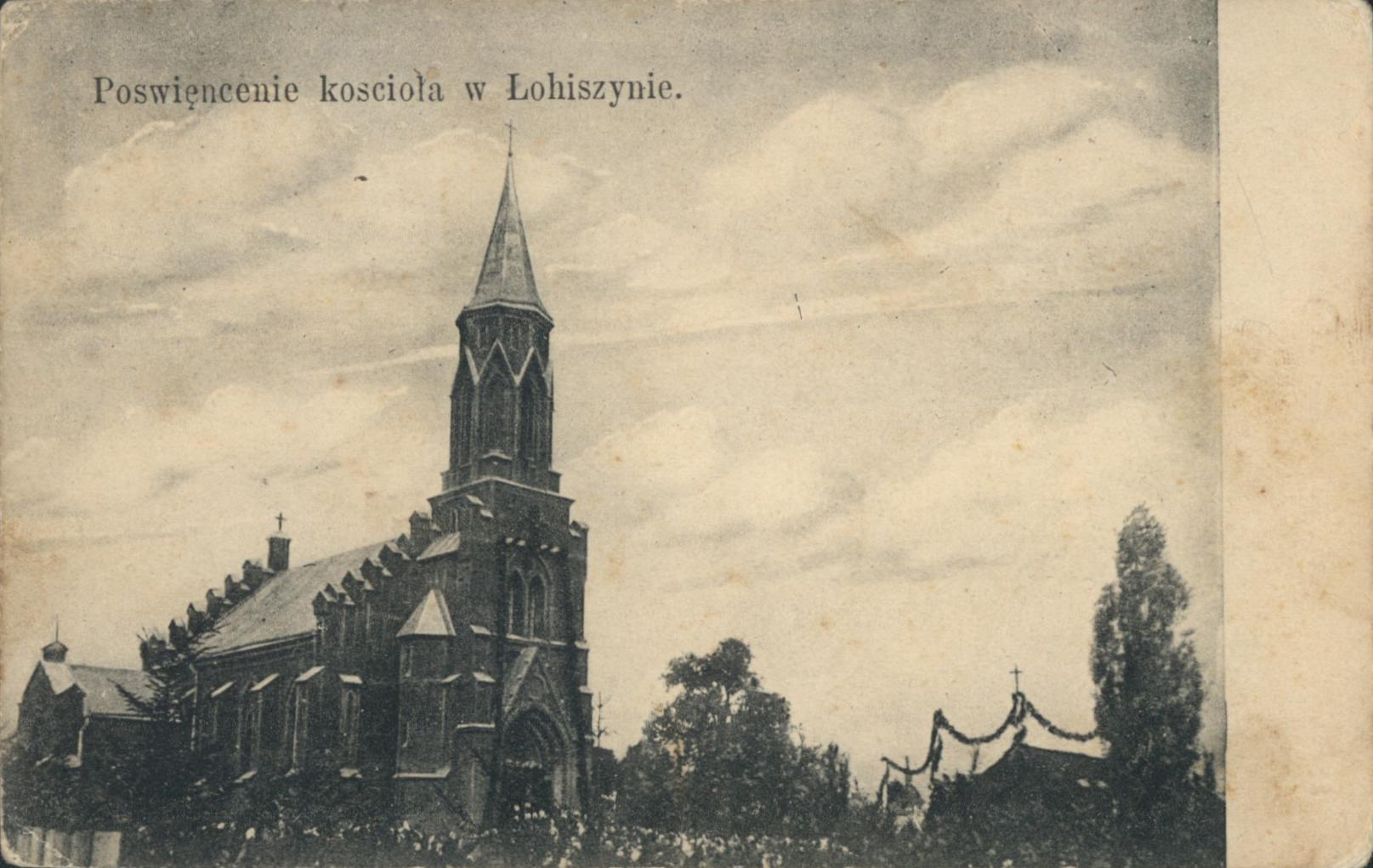
Local Catholic church in 1913

It was granted town rights in 1643 by King Władysław IV Vasa. In the 18th century, the starostwo of Łohiszyn passed between the Radziwiłł, Ogiński and Lubecki noble families. It was administratively located in the Pińsk County in the Brześć Litewski Voivodeship of the Polish–Lithuanian Commonwealth.

In the interwar period Łohiszyn, as it was known in Polish, was a town administratively located in the Pińsk County in the Polesie Voivodeship of Poland. According to the 1921 Polish census, the population was 92.2% Polish and 7.7% Jewish.

Following the invasion of Poland at the start of World War II in September 1939, Łohiszyn was first occupied by the Soviet Union until 1941, then by Nazi Germany until 1944, and then re-occupied by the Soviet Union, which eventually annexed it from Poland in 1945.

== Demographics ==
Historical population
Year	Pop.	±%
1921	1,984	—
2009	2,372	+19.6%
2023	1,807	−23.8%
2024	1,773	−1.9%
2025	1,769	−0.2%
2026	1,721	−2.7%

Distribution of the population by ethnicity according to the 2009 census:

	percent
Belarusians	65.64%
Poles	28.96%
Russians	3.50%
Ukrainians	1.26%
Armenians	0.17%
