= Kokhanava =

Urban-type settlement in Vitebsk Region, Belarus

Kokhanava Коханава (Belarusian) Коханово (Russian)
- Urban-type settlement
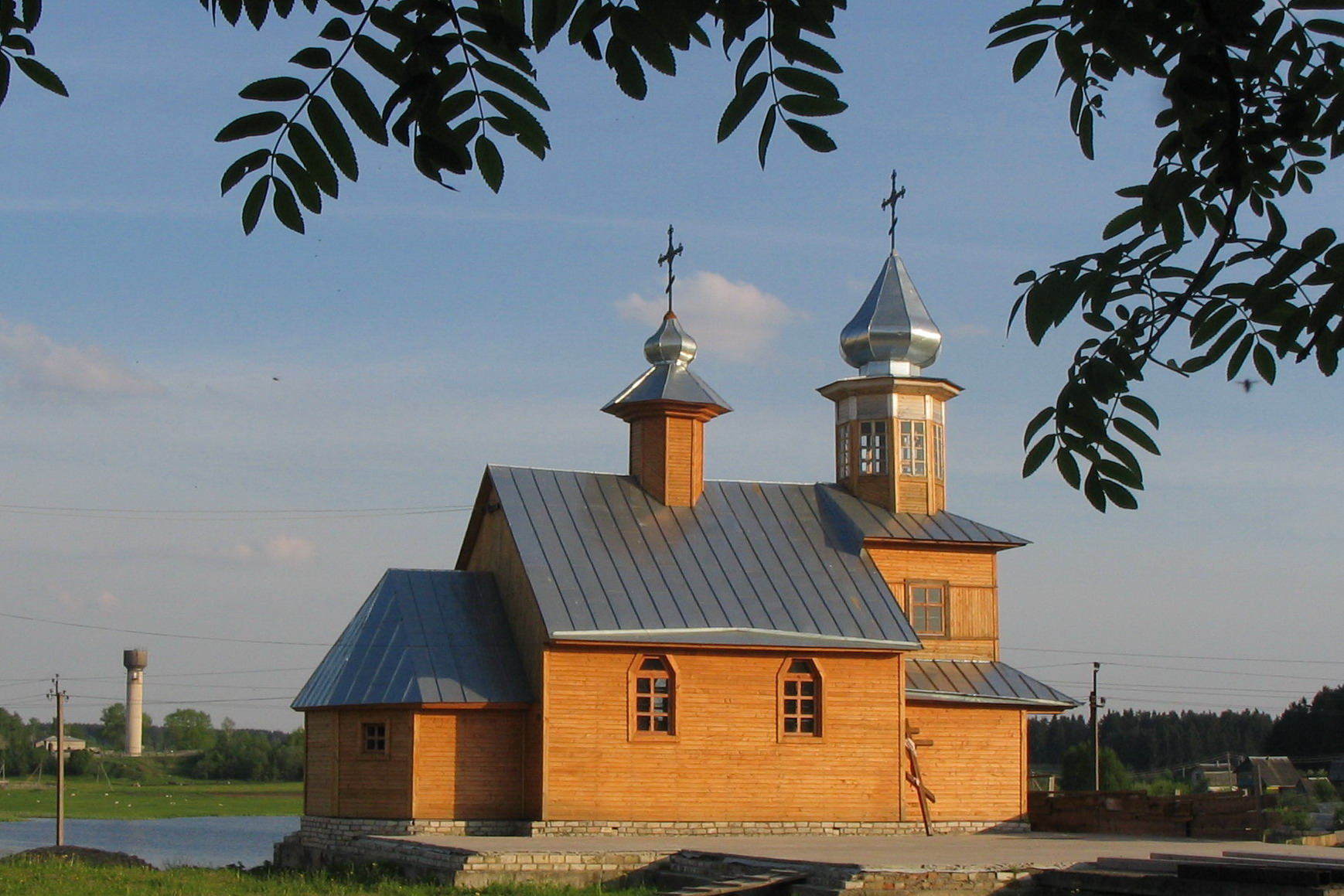

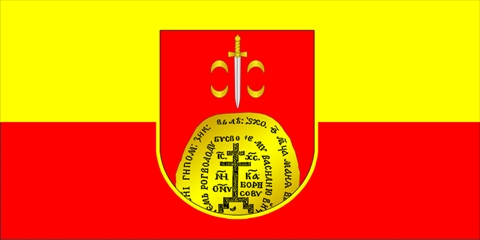
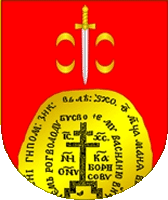
- Flag Coat of arms

- Location within Belarus
- Coordinates: 54°27′15″N 30°00′30″E
- Country: Belarus
- Region: Vitebsk Region
- District: Talachyn District

Population (2024)
  - Total: 3,727
- Time zone: UTC+3 (MSK)

Kokhanava (Belarusian: Коханава; Russian: Коханово, romanized: Kokhanovo) is an urban-type settlement in Talachyn District, Vitebsk Region, in eastern Belarus. As of 2024, it has a population of 3,727.

== History ==
During World War II, from July to September 1941, the German occupiers operated the Dulag 203 transit prisoner-of-war camp in the settlement.
