= Tatarka, Asipovichy district =

Urban-type settlement in Mogilev Region, Belarus

Tatarka Татарка
- Urban-type settlement
- Location within Belarus
- Coordinates: 53°15′30″N 28°49′26″E
- Country: Belarus
- Region: Mogilev Region
- District: Asipovichy District

Population (2024)
  - Total: 437
- Time zone: UTC+3 (MSK)

Tatarka (Belarusian: Татарка; Russian: Татарка) is an urban-type settlement (a work settlement) in Asipovichy District, Mogilev Region, Belarus. It serves as the administrative center of Tatarka selsoviet. As of 2024, it has a population of 437.
