= Streshyn =

Urban-type settlement in Gomel Region, Belarus

Streshyn Стрэшын (Belarusian) Стрешин (Russian)
- Urban-type settlement
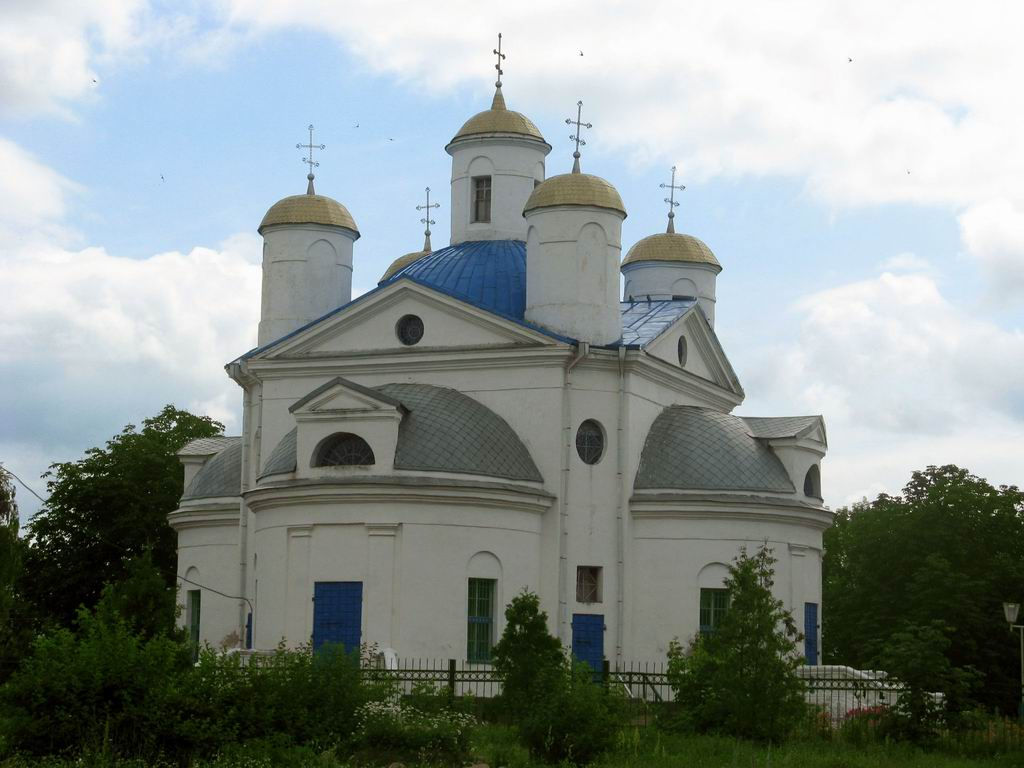

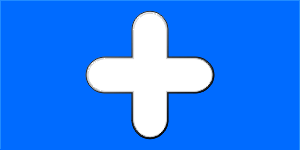
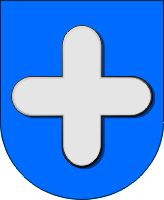
- Flag Coat of arms

- Location within Belarus
- Coordinates: 52°43′42″N 30°06′49″E
- Country: Belarus
- Region: Gomel Region
- District: Zhlobin District

Population (2025)
  - Total: 886
- Time zone: UTC+3 (MSK)

Streshyn (Belarusian: Стрэшын, romanized: Strešyn; Russian: Стрешин, romanized: Streshin) is an urban-type settlement in Zhlobin District, Gomel Region, Belarus. As of 2025, it has a population of 886.
