= Tsyerakhowka =

Urban-type settlement in Gomel Region, Belarus

Tsyerakhowka Церахоўка (Belarusian) Тереховка (Russian)
- Urban-type settlement
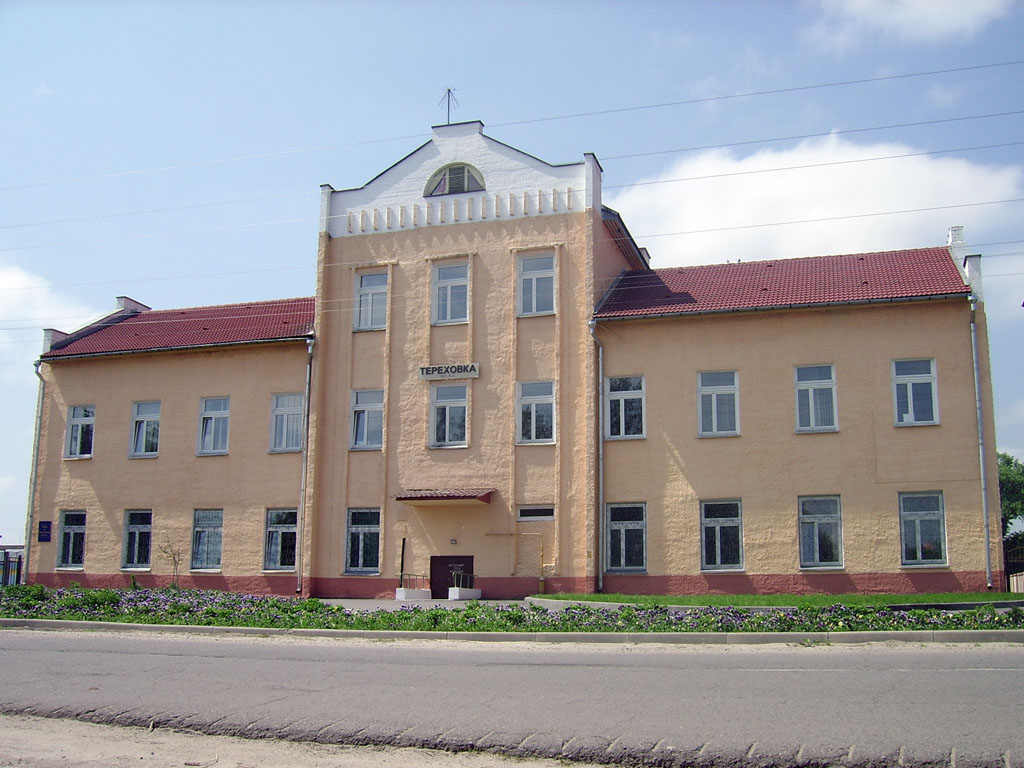

- Location within Belarus
- Coordinates: 52°13′03″N 31°26′57″E
- Country: Belarus
- Region: Gomel Region
- District: Dobrush District

Population (2025)
  - Total: 2,909
- Time zone: UTC+3 (MSK)

Tsyerakhowka (Belarusian: Церахоўка, romanized: Cierachoŭka; Russian: Тереховка, romanized: Terekhovka) is an urban-type settlement in Dobrush District, Gomel Region, Belarus. As of 2025, it has a population of 2,909.
