= Arekhawsk =

Urban-type settlement in Vitebsk Region, Belarus

Arekhawsk Арэхаўск (Belarusian) Ореховск (Russian)
- Urban-type settlement
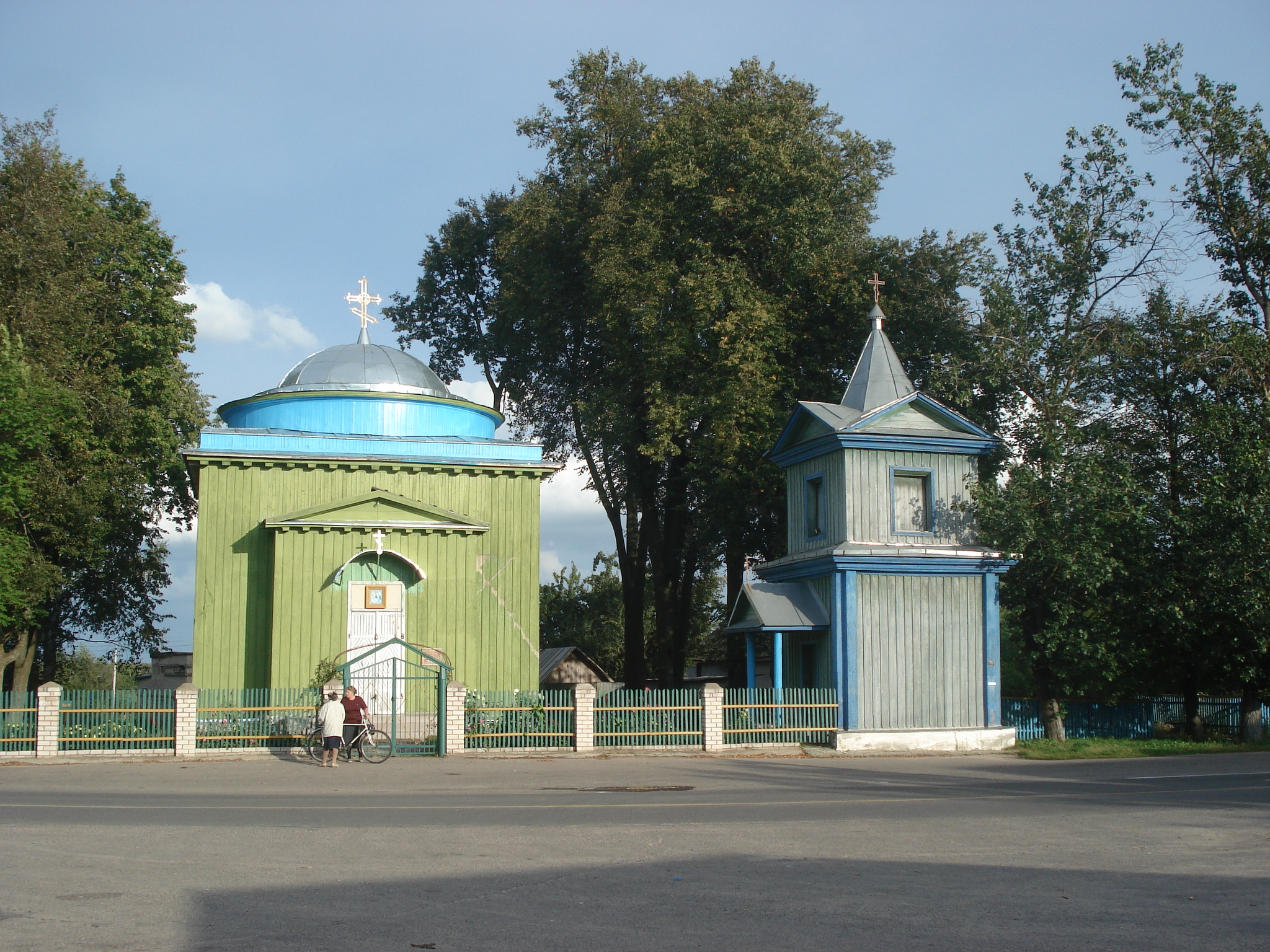

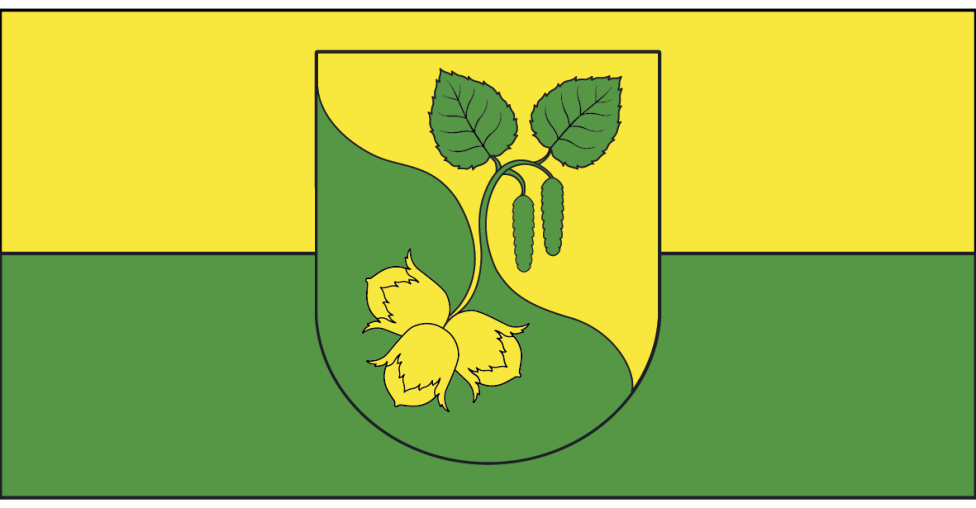
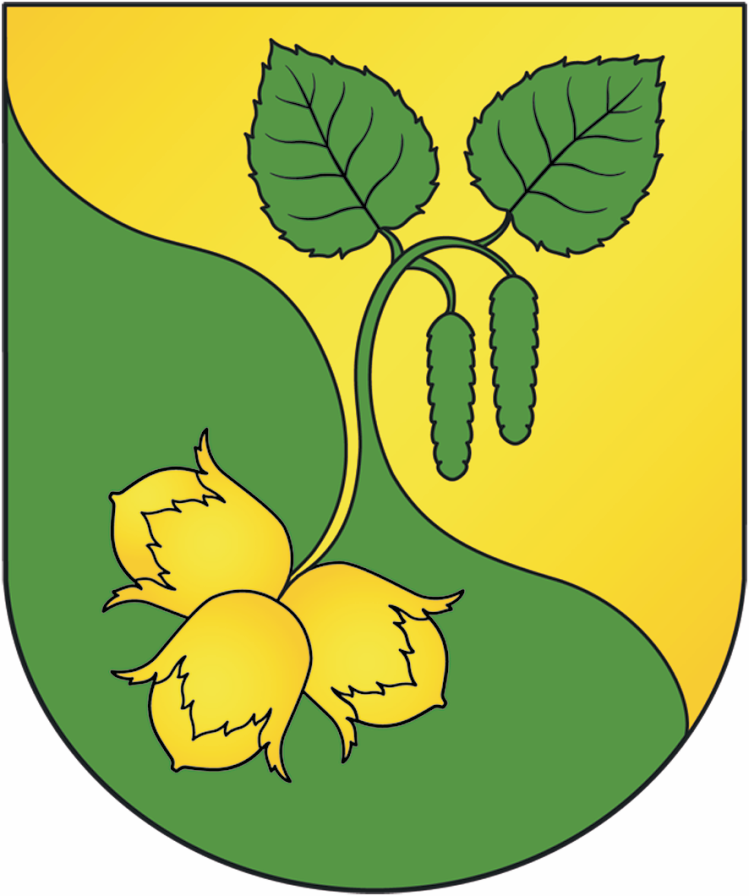
- Flag Coat of arms

- Location within Belarus
- Coordinates: 54°41′42″N 30°29′50″E
- Country: Belarus
- Region: Vitebsk Region
- District: Orsha District

Population (2025)
  - Total: 2,266
- Time zone: UTC+3 (MSK)

Arekhawsk (Belarusian: Арэхаўск, romanized: Arechaŭsk; Russian: Ореховск, romanized: Orekhovsk) is an urban-type settlement in Orsha District, Vitebsk Region, Belarus. As of 2025, it has a population of 2,266.
