= Kapatkyevichy =

Urban-type settlement in Gomel Region, Belarus

Kapatkyevichy Капаткевічы (Belarusian) Копаткевичи (Russian)
- Urban-type settlement
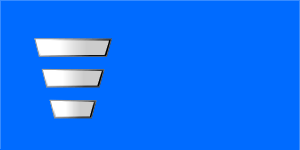
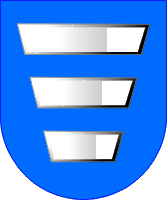
- Flag Coat of arms

- Location within Belarus
- Coordinates: 52°19′02″N 28°48′52″E
- Country: Belarus
- Region: Gomel Region
- District: Pyetrykaw District

Population (2025)
  - Total: 2,705
- Time zone: UTC+3 (MSK)

Kapatkyevichy (Belarusian: Капаткевічы, romanized: Kapatkievičy; Russian: Копаткевичи, romanized: Kopatkevichi) is an urban-type settlement in Pyetrykaw District, Gomel Region, Belarus. As of 2025, it has a population of 2,705.
