= Tsyelyakhany =

Urban-type settlement in Brest Region, Belarus

Tsyelyakhany Целяханы (Belarusian) Телеханы (Russian) Telekhany
- Urban-type settlement
- Location within Belarus
- Coordinates: 52°30′26″N 25°50′32″E
- Country: Belarus
- Region: Brest Region
- District: Ivatsevichy District

Population (2026)
  - Total: 3,625
- Time zone: UTC+3 (MSK)

Tsyelyakhany or Telekhany (Belarusian: Целяханы, romanized: Cieliachany, local pronunciation: [tʲɛlʲɛxanɪ], [t͡sʲɛlʲɛxanɪ]; Russian: Телеханы) is an urban-type settlement in Ivatsevichy District, Brest Region, Belarus. It is situated in the historical region of Polesia by the Oginski Canal. As of 2026, it has a population of 3,625.

== History ==
Before 1939 it was part of the Interwar Poland, the seat of Gmina Telechany, Powiat Kosówski, Polesie Voivodship.

During World War II, the Jewish community was massacred by a cavalry detachment of SS in August 1941, according to the memoirs of Bogdan Mielnik, a Polish resident of Telekhany.
