= Kazlowshchyna =

Urban-type settlement in Grodno Region, Belarus

Kazlowshchyna Казлоўшчына (Belarusian) Козловщина (Russian)
- Urban-type settlement
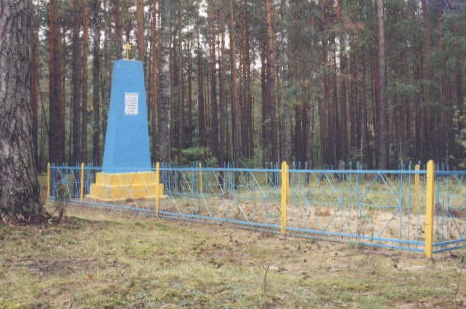
- Monument

- Location within Belarus
- Coordinates: 53°19′N 25°18′E
- Country: Belarus
- Region: Grodno Region
- District: Dzyatlava District

Population (2025)
  - Total: 1,437
- Time zone: UTC+3 (MSK)

Kazlowshchyna (Belarusian: Казлоўшчына, romanized: Kazloŭščyna; Russian: Козловщина, romanized: Kozlovshchina) is an urban-type settlement in Dzyatlava District, Grodno Region, Belarus. In 2025 it had a population of 1,437.
