= Uvaravichy =

Urban-type settlement in Gomel Region, Belarus

Uvaravichy Уваравічы (Belarusian) Уваровичи (Russian)
- Urban-type settlement
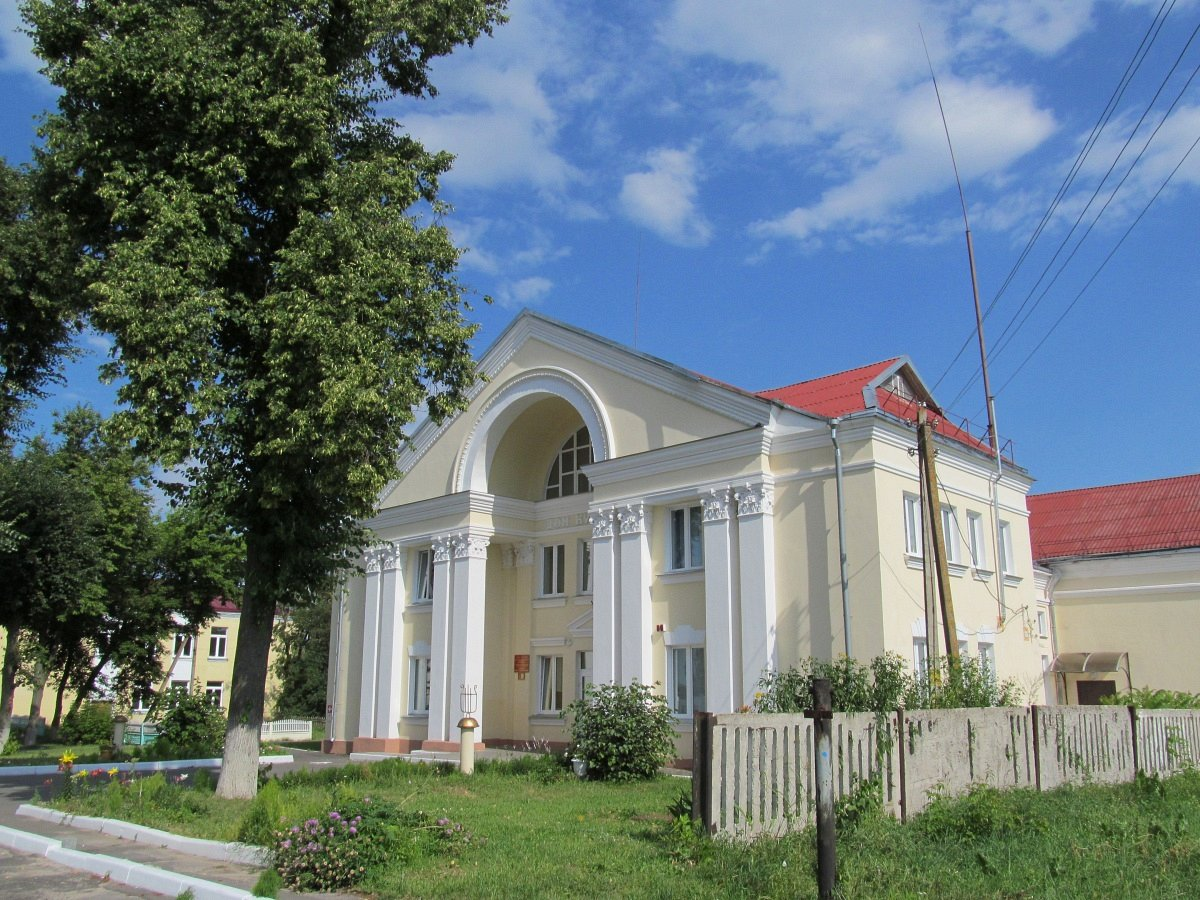

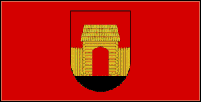
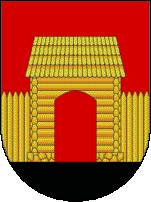
- Flag Coat of arms

- Location within Belarus
- Coordinates: 52°35′38″N 30°43′42″E
- Country: Belarus
- Region: Gomel Region
- District: Buda-Kashalyova District

Population (2025)
  - Total: 2,088
- Time zone: UTC+3 (MSK)

Uvaravichy (Belarusian: Уваравічы, romanized: Uvaravičy; Russian: Уваровичи, romanized: Uvarovichi) is an urban-type settlement in Buda-Kashalyova District, Gomel Region, Belarus. As of 2025, it has a population of 2,088.
