= Yalizava =

Urban-type settlement in Gomel Region, Belarus

Yalizava Ялізава (Belarusian) Елизово (Russian)
- Urban-type settlement
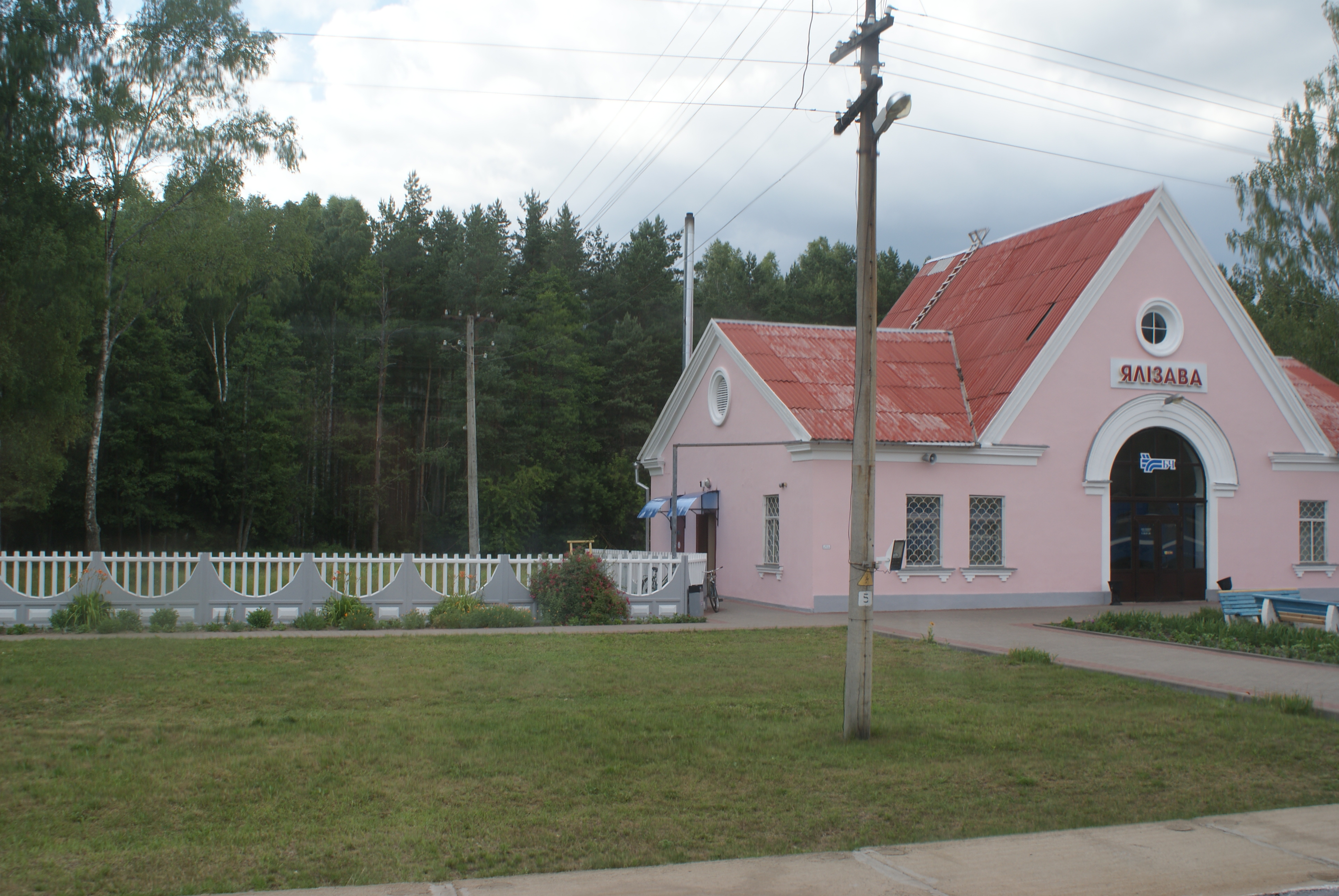

- Location within Belarus
- Coordinates: 53°23′56″N 29°00′25″E
- Country: Belarus
- Region: Mogilev Region
- District: Asipovichy District

Population (2024)
  - Total: 2,009
- Time zone: UTC+3 (MSK)

Yalizava (Belarusian: Ялізава, romanized: Jalizava; Russian: Елизово, romanized: Yelizovo) is an urban-type settlement (a work settlement) in Asipovichy District, Mogilev Region, Belarus. As of 2024, it has a population of 2,009.
