= Varapayeva =

Urban-type settlement in Vitebsk Region, Belarus

Varapayeva Варапаева (Belarusian) Воропаево (Russian)
- Urban-type settlement
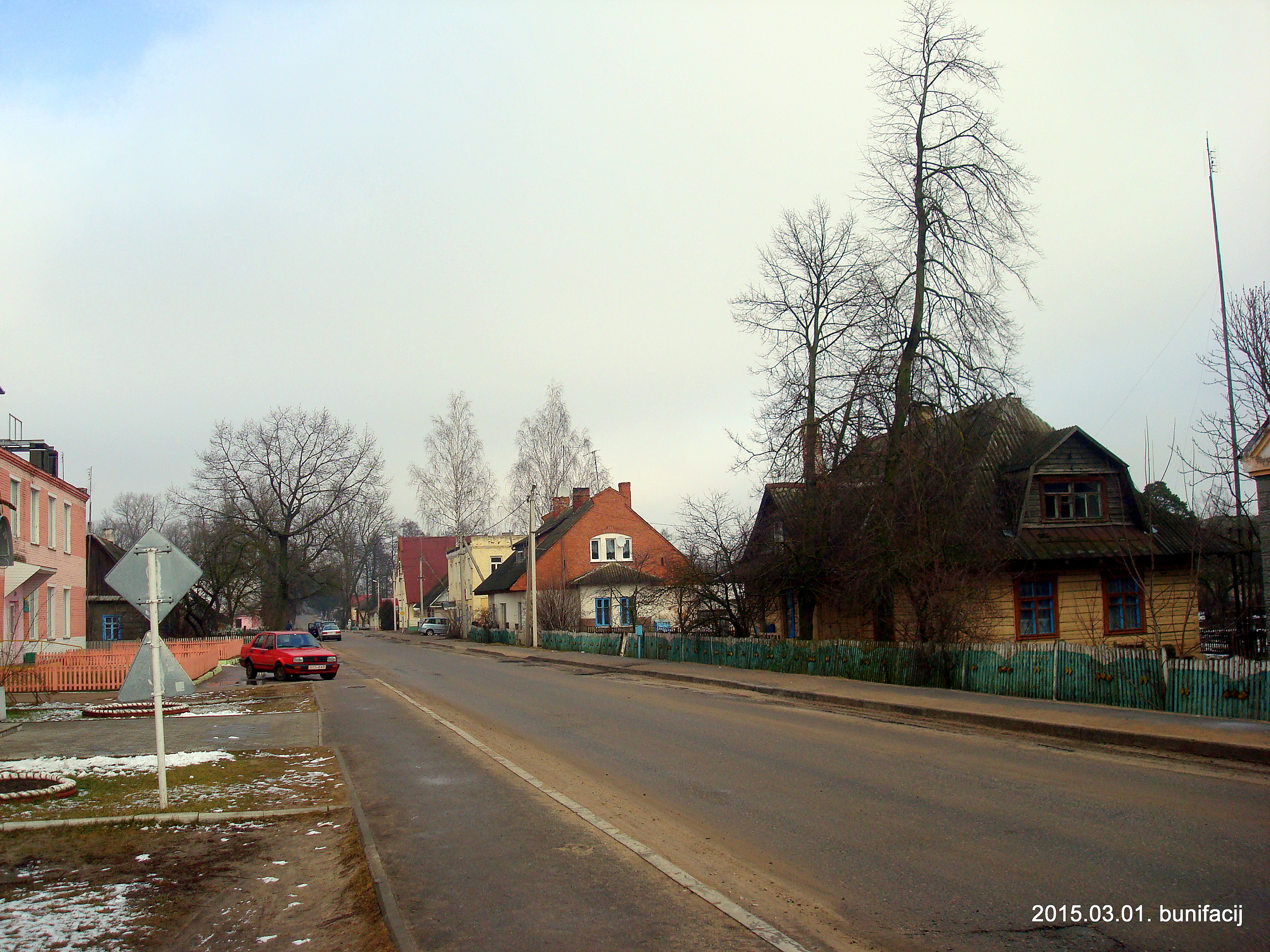

- Location within Belarus
- Coordinates: 55°08′34″N 27°12′08″E
- Country: Belarus
- Region: Vitebsk Region
- District: Pastavy District

Population (2025)
  - Total: 2,111
- Time zone: UTC+3 (MSK)

Varapayeva (Belarusian: Варапаева, romanized: Varapajeva; Russian: Воропаево, romanized: Voropayevo) is an urban-type settlement in Pastavy District, Vitebsk Region, Belarus. As of 2025, it has a population of 2,111.

== History ==
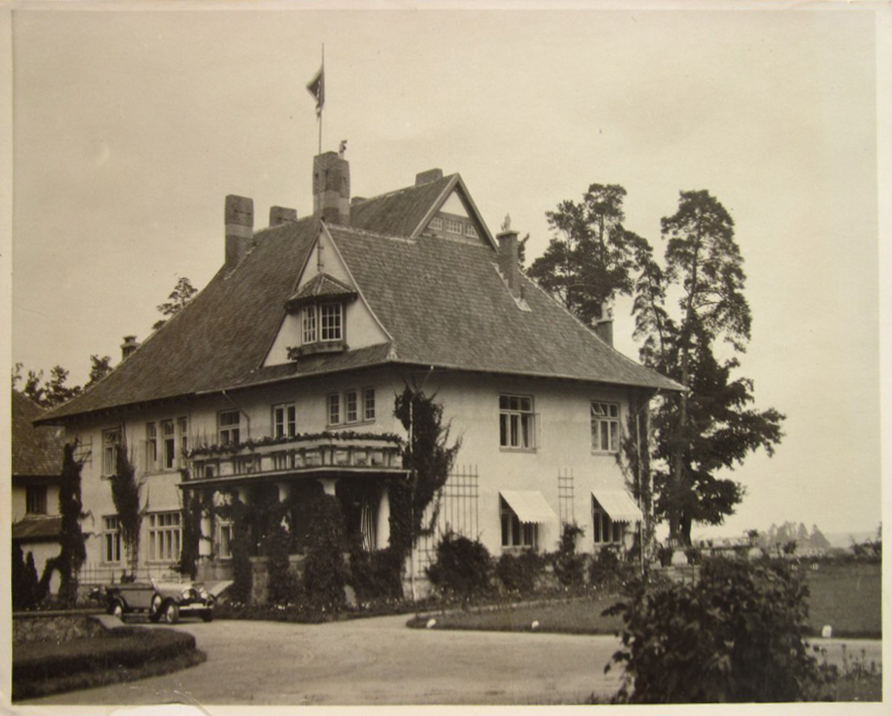
Przezdziecki Palace in the 1930s

Woropajewo, as it was known in Polish, was part of Poland in the interwar period. According to the 1921 census, the population was 50.1% Polish, 38.7% Belarusian, and 7.3% Jewish.

Following the invasion of Poland in September 1939 at the start of World War II, the town was first occupied by the Soviet Union until 1941, then by Nazi Germany until 1944, and re-occupied by the Soviet Union afterwards, which eventually annexed it from Poland in 1945.
