= Yuratsishki =

Urban-type settlement in Grodno Region, Belarus

Yuratsishki Юрацішкі (Belarusian) Юратишки (Russian)
- Urban-type settlement
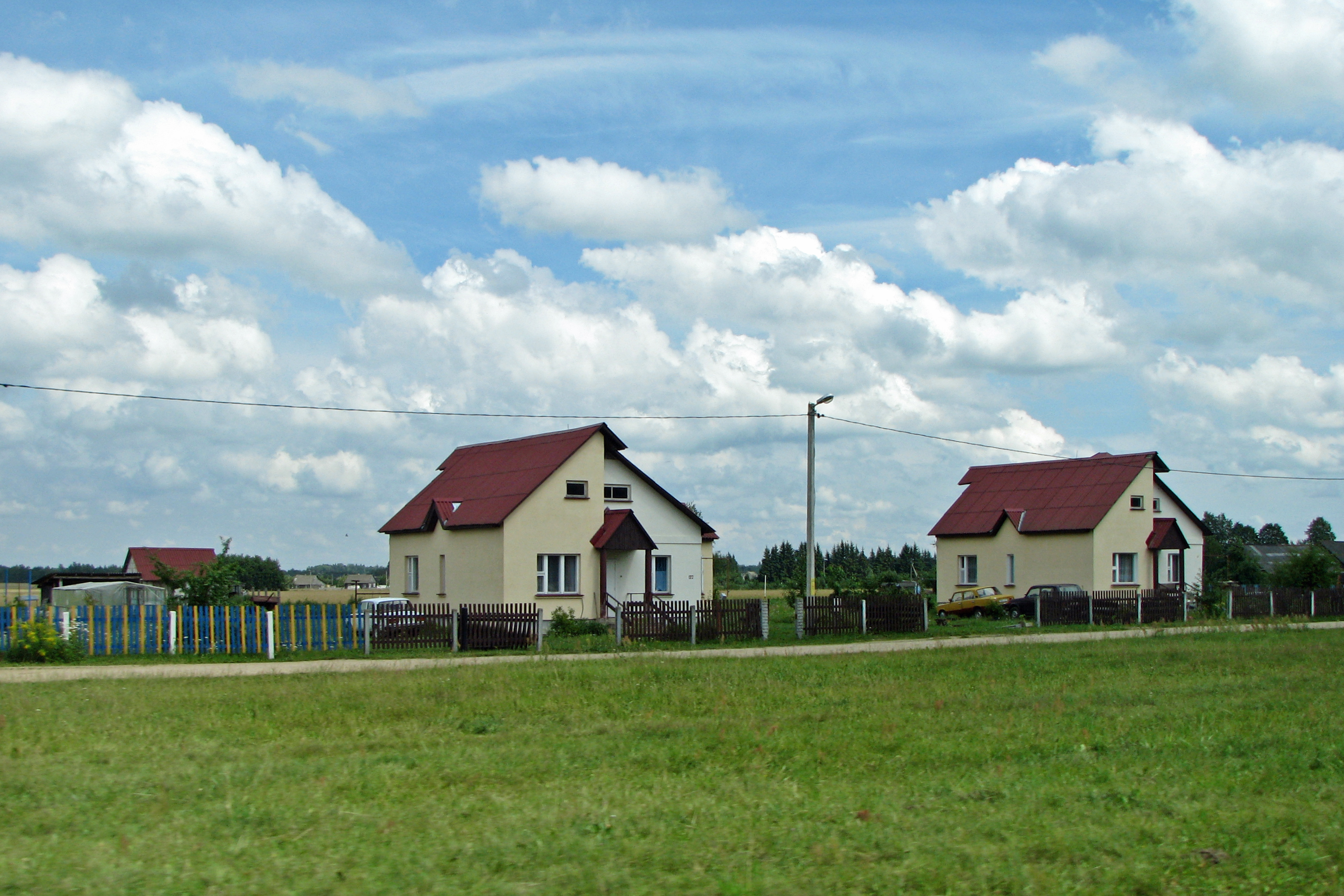

- Location within Belarus
- Coordinates: 54°01′56″N 25°55′58″E
- Country: Belarus
- Region: Grodno Region
- District: Iwye District

Population (2025)
  - Total: 1,336
- Time zone: UTC+3 (MSK)

Yuratsishki (Belarusian: Юрацішкі, romanized: Juraciški; Russian: Юратишки, romanized: Yuratishki) is an urban-type settlement in Iwye District, Grodno Region, Belarus. As of 2025, it has a population of 1,336.

== History ==
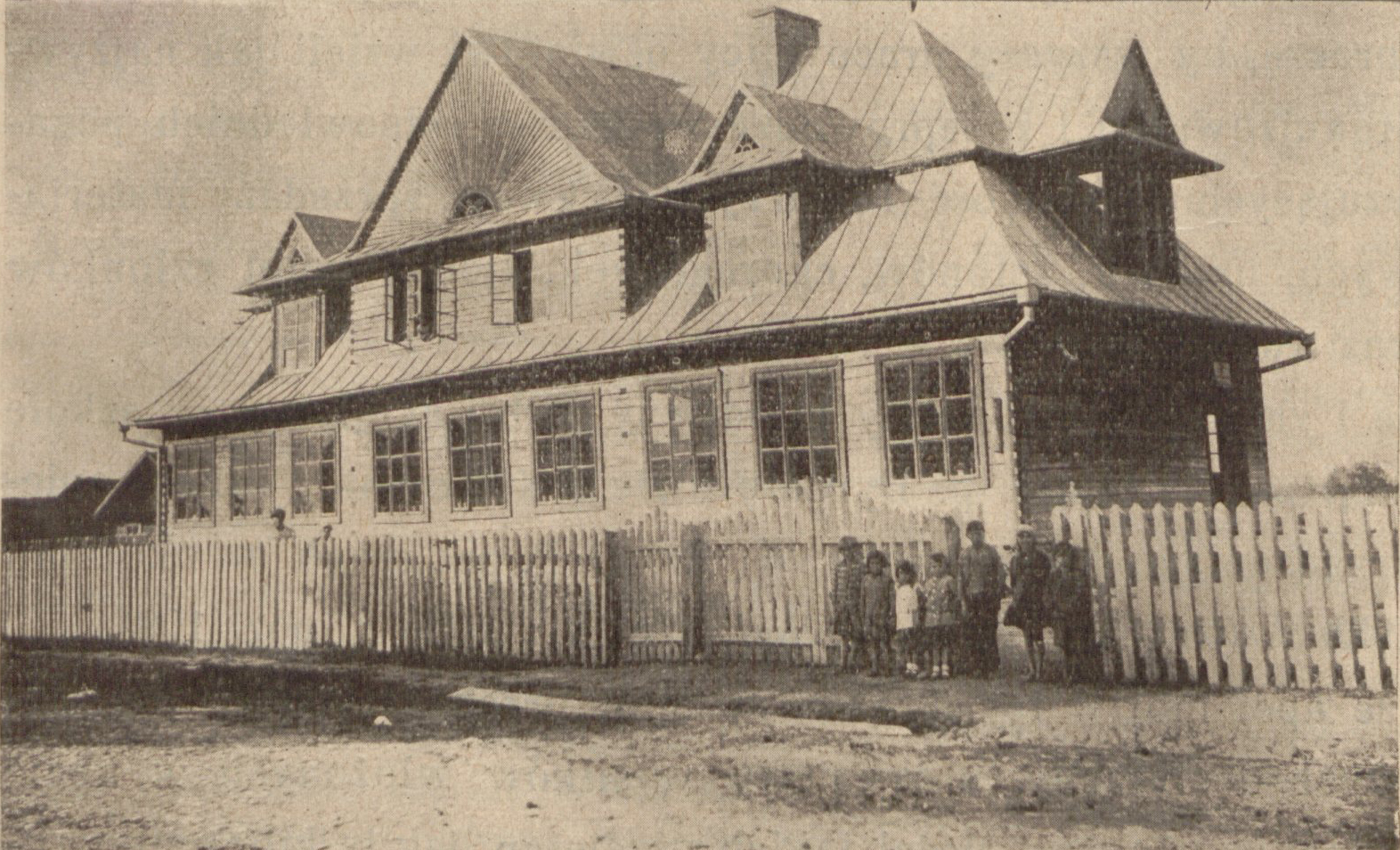
Local school in 1937

Juraciszki was a private possession of the Kopeć, Kościałkowski and Rodkiewicz noble families within the Polish–Lithuanian Commonwealth.

Juraciszki, as it was known in Polish, was administratively located in the Wołożyn County in the Nowogródek Voivodeship of interwar Poland. According to the 1921 census, the population was 74.9% Polish, 12.8% Belarusian and 12.3% Jewish.

During World War II, the town was first occupied by the Soviet Union until 1941, then by Nazi Germany until 1944, and re-occupied by the Soviet Union afterwards. The local Polish police chief was murdered by the Russians in the Katyn massacre in 1940.
