= Vyetryna =

Urban-type settlement in Vitebsk Region, Belarus

Vyetryna Ветрына (Belarusian) Ветрино (Russian)
- Urban-type settlement
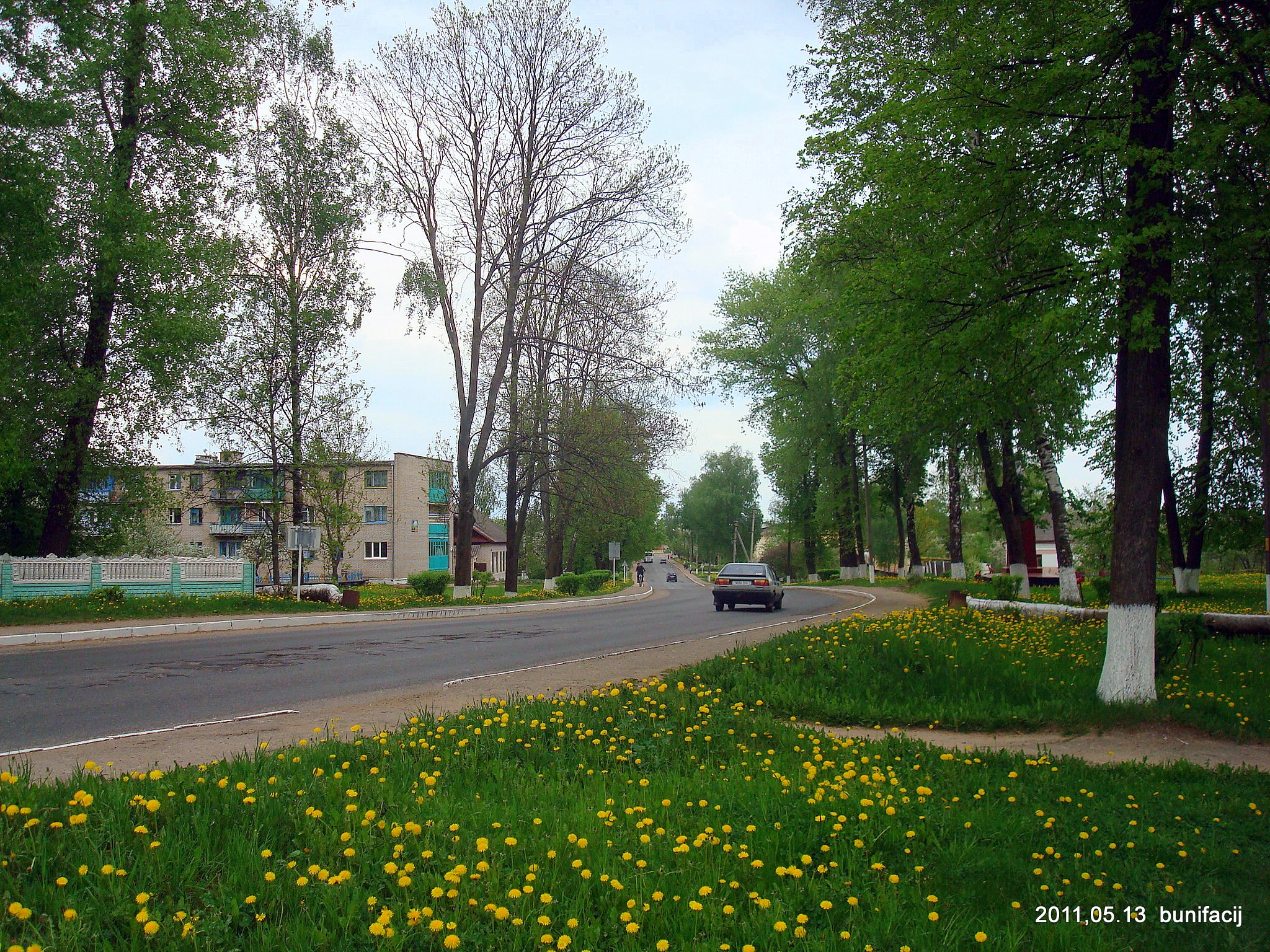

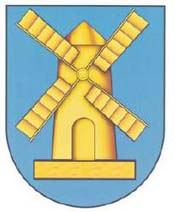
- Coat of arms

- Location within Belarus
- Coordinates: 55°24′42″N 28°28′30″E
- Country: Belarus
- Region: Vitebsk Region
- District: Polotsk District

Population (2025)
  - Total: 1,634
- Time zone: UTC+3 (MSK)

Vyetryna (Belarusian: Ветрына, romanized: Vietryna; Russian: Ветрино, romanized: Vetrino) is an urban-type settlement in Polotsk District, Vitebsk Region, Belarus. As of 2025, it has a population of 1,634.
