= Asvyeya =

Urban-type settlement in Vitebsk Region, Belarus

Asvyeya Асвея (Belarusian) Освея (Russian)
- Urban-type settlement
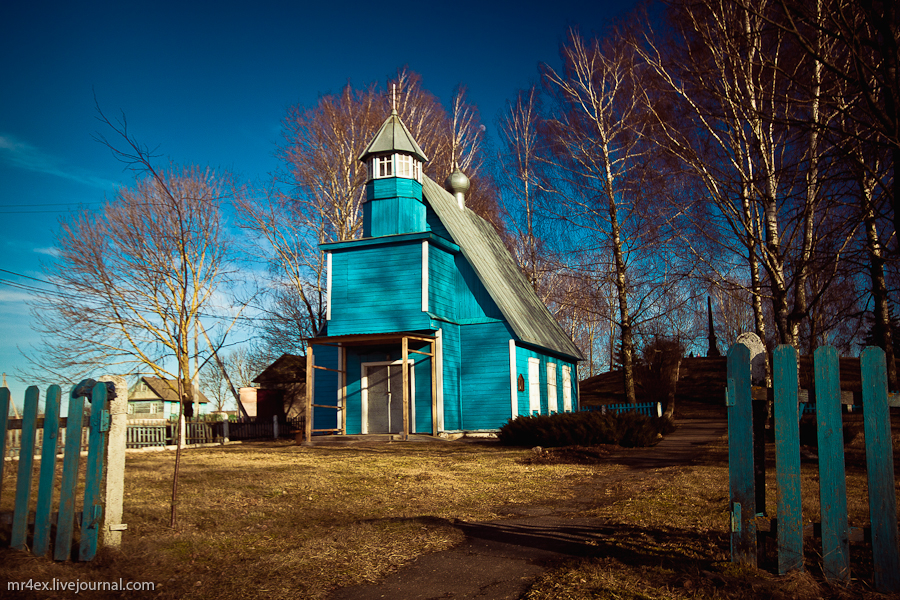

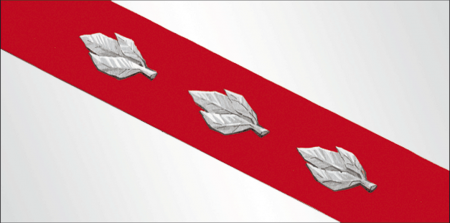
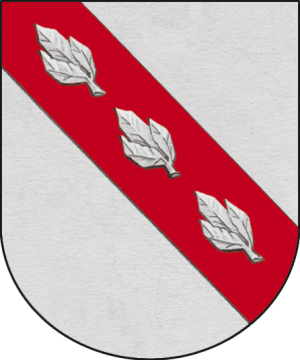
- Flag Coat of arms

- Location within Belarus
- Coordinates: 56°00′53″N 28°06′37″E
- Country: Belarus
- Region: Vitebsk Region
- District: Vyerkhnyadzvinsk District

Population (2025)
  - Total: 916
- Time zone: UTC+3 (MSK)

Asvyeya (Belarusian: Асвея, romanized: Asvieja; Russian: Освея, romanized: Osveya), also historically known as Osvey, (Note: Russian: Освей.) is an urban-type settlement in Vyerkhnyadzvinsk District, Vitebsk Region, Belarus. As of 2025, it has a population of 916.

== Sources ==
- "Освей" . Brockhaus and Efron Encyclopedic Dictionary (in Russian). 1906.
