= Pruzhany district =

District of Brest region, Belarus

Pruzhany district Пружанскі раён (Belarusian) Пружанский район (Russian)
- District
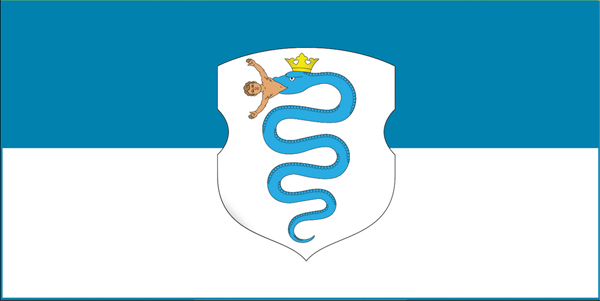
- Flag Coat of arms

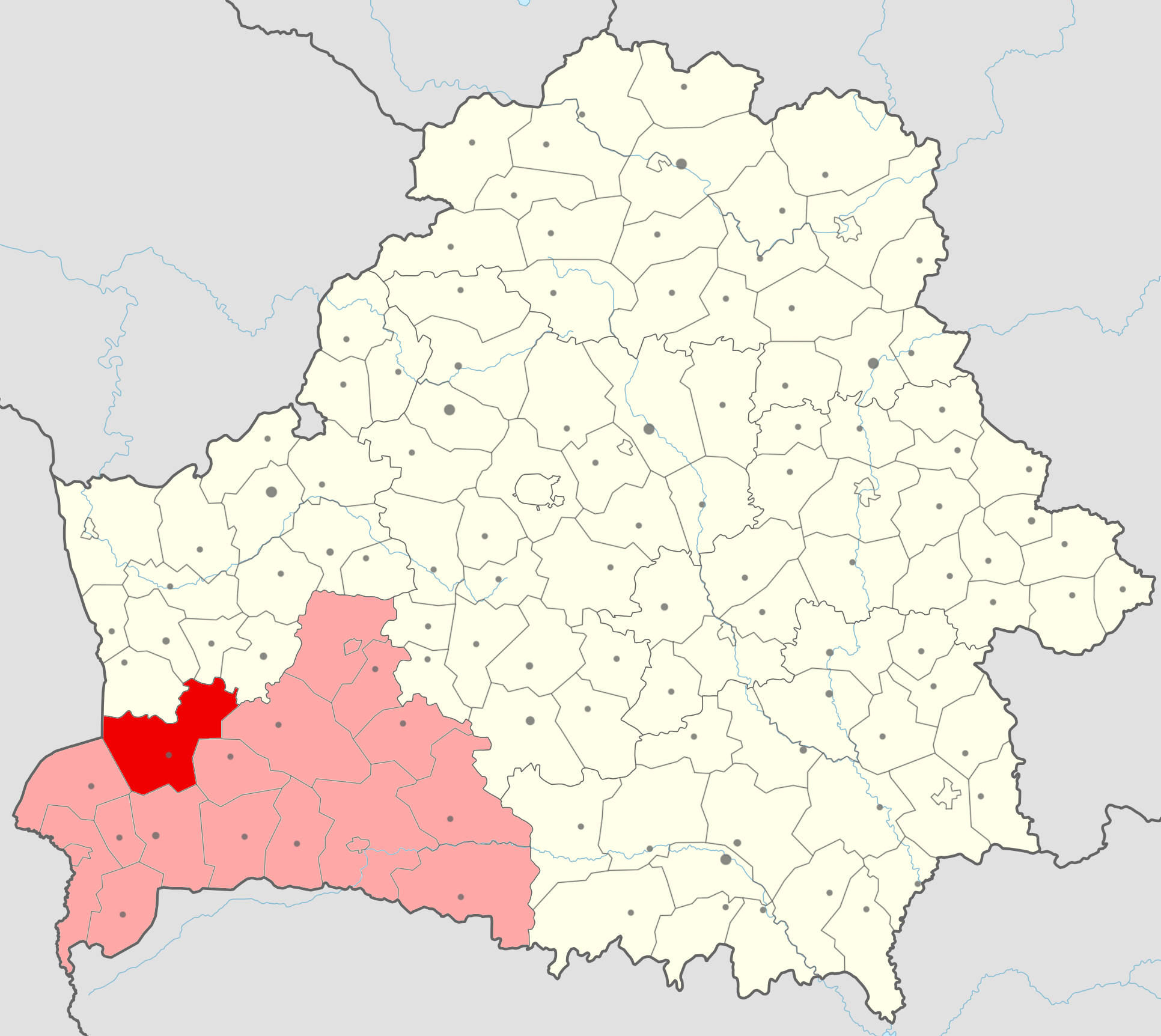
- Country: Belarus
- Region: Brest region
- Administrative center: Pruzhany

Government
  - Chairman: Mikhail Nikolayevich Kreydich

Area
  - Total: 2,825.91 km^{2} (1,091.09 sq mi)

Population (2024)
  - Urban: 23,255
  - Rural: 18,348
  - Total: 41,603

Ethnicity
  - Belarusian: 87.49%
  - Russian: 6.43%
  - Ukrainian: 3.40%
  - Polish: 1.85%
  - Other: 0.83%
- Time zone: UTC+3 (MSK)
- Area code: 1632
- Cities: 1
- Rural councils: 12
- Settlements: 245
- Website: Official website

Pruzhany district or Pružany district (Belarusian: Пружанскі раён, romanized: Pružanski rajon; Russian: Пружанский район, romanized: Pruzhansky rayon) is district (raion) of Brest region in Belarus. Its administrative center is Pruzhany. As of 2024, it has a population of 41,603.

== Demographics ==
At the time of the 2009 Belarusian census, Pruzhany district had a population of 52,511. Of these, 87.5% were of Belarusian, 6.4% Russian, 3.4% Ukrainian and 1.9% Polish ethnicity. 65.4% spoke Belarusian and 31.7% Russian as their native language. In 2023, it had a population of 42,330.

== Administrative divisions ==
The district is subdivided into one city and 12 rural councils administering a total of 245 settlements (two urban and 243 rural).

Name	Name (Belarusian)	Name (Russian)	Type	Settlements
Pruzhany	Пружаны	Пружаны	city of district subordinance	
Velikasyel'ski	Велікасельскі	Великосельский	rural council	13
Zyelyanyevitski	Зеляневіцкі	Зеленевичский	rural council	24
Linawski	Лінаўскі	Линовский	rural council	26
Mokrawski	Мокраўскі	Мокровский	rural council	24
Navazasimavitski	Навазасімавіцкі	Новозасимовичский	rural council	1
Pruzhanski	Пружанскі	Пружанский	rural council	19
Sukhopal'ski	Сухопальскі	Сухопольский	rural council	28
Kharawski	Хараўскі	Хоревской	rural council	20
Shanyawski	Шаняўскі	Шеневской	rural council	19
Shcharchowski	Шчарчоўскі	Щерчовский	rural council	22
Ruzhanski	Ружанскі	Ружанский	rural council	33
Sharashewski	Шарашэўскі	Шерешевский	rural council	16

Historical population
Year	Pop.	±%
1959	83,267	—
1970	79,399	−4.6%
1979	74,141	−6.6%
1989	68,492	−7.6%
1999	64,718	−5.5%
2009	52,211	−19.3%
2017	47,340	−9.3%
