= Rechytsa, Stolin district =

Urban-type settlement in Brest Region, Belarus

Rechytsa Рэчыца (Belarusian) Речица (Russian)
- Urban-type settlement
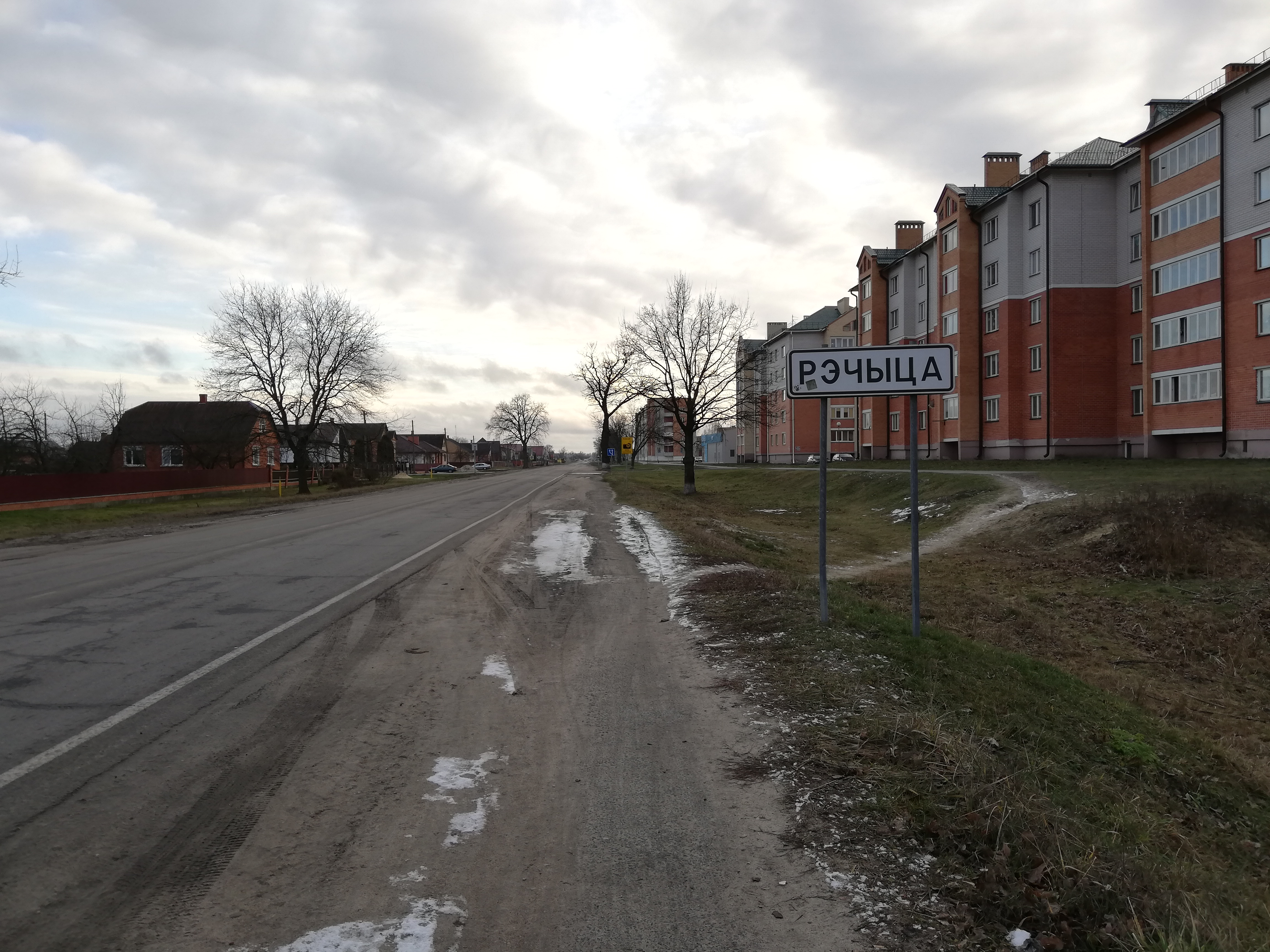

- Location within Belarus
- Coordinates: 51°51′N 26°47′E
- Country: Belarus
- Region: Brest Region
- District: Stolin District

Population (2025)
  - Total: 5,538
- Time zone: UTC+3 (MSK)

Rechytsa (Belarusian: Рэчыца, romanized: Rečyca; Russian: Речица, romanized: Rechitsa) is an urban-type settlement (a work settlement) in Stolin District, Brest Region, Belarus. As of 2025, it has a population of 5,538.
