= Hlybokaye district =

District of Vitebsk region, Belarus

Coordinates: 55°08′N 27°41′E

Hlybokaye district Глыбоцкі раён (Belarusian) Глубокский район (Russian)
- District
- Flag Coat of arms

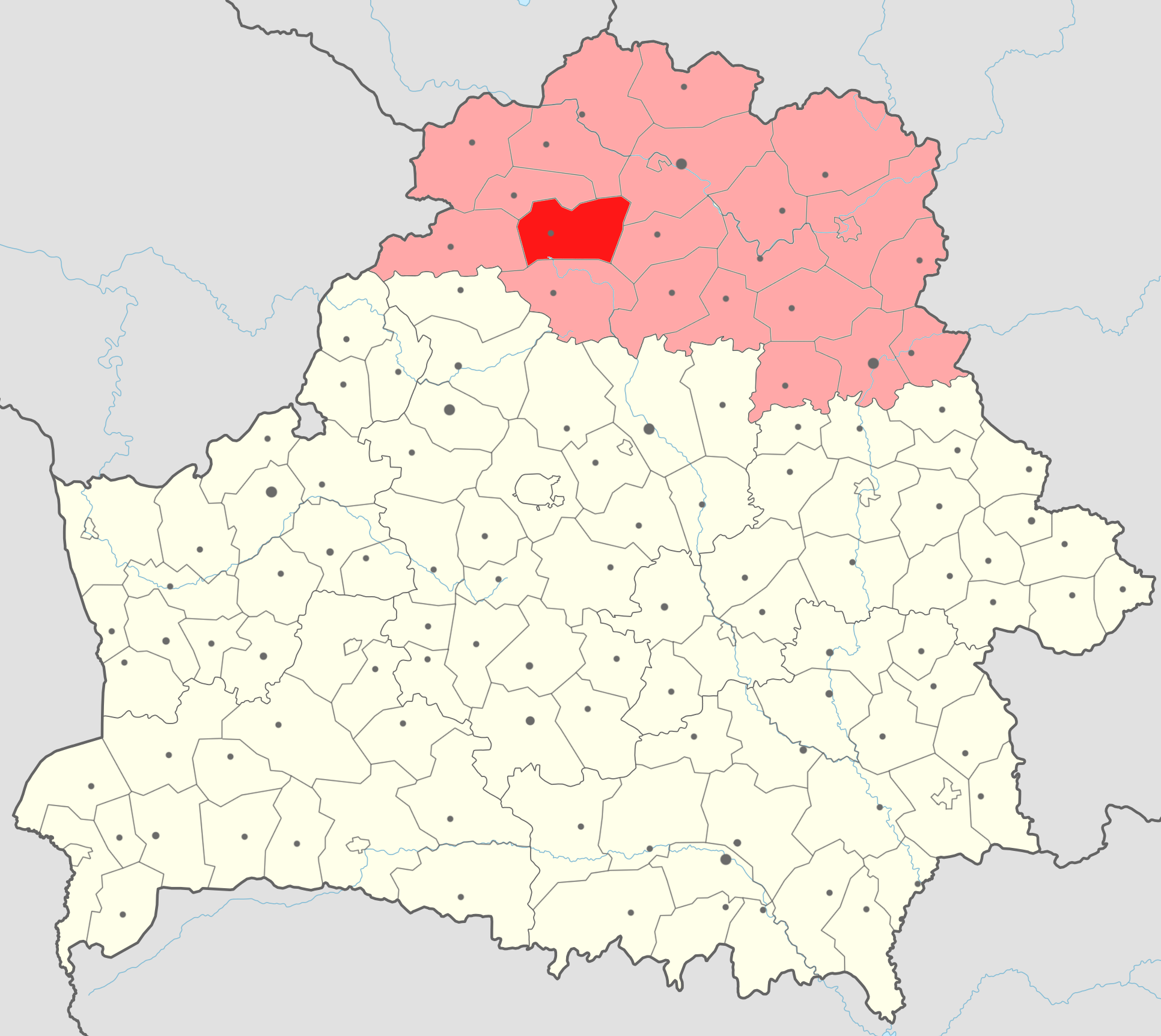
- Country: Belarus
- Region: Vitebsk region
- Administrative center: Hlybokaye

Area
  - Total: 1,759.58 km^{2} (679.38 sq mi)

Population (2023)
  - Total: 33,627
  - Density: 19.111/km^{2} (49.497/sq mi)
- Time zone: UTC+3 (MSK)

Hlybokaye district or Hlybokaje district (Belarusian: Глыбоцкі раён; Russian: Глубокский район) is a district (raion) in Vitebsk region, Belarus. The administrative center of the district is the town of Hlybokaye.

== Notable residents ==
- Ihnat Bujnicki (1881, Palivačy estate - 1917), Belarusian actor and theatre director, described as “the father of the Belarusian theatre”
- Jazep Drazdovič (1888, Puńki village –1954), Belarusian painter, archaeologist, and ethnographer
- Vaclau Lastouski (1883, Kalesniki hamlet – 1938), Belarusian critic, historian of literature, and politician, victim of Stalin's purges
