= Vawkavysk district =

District of Grodno region, Belarus

Vawkavysk district Ваўкавыскі раён (Belarusian) Волковысский район (Russian)
- District
- Flag Coat of arms

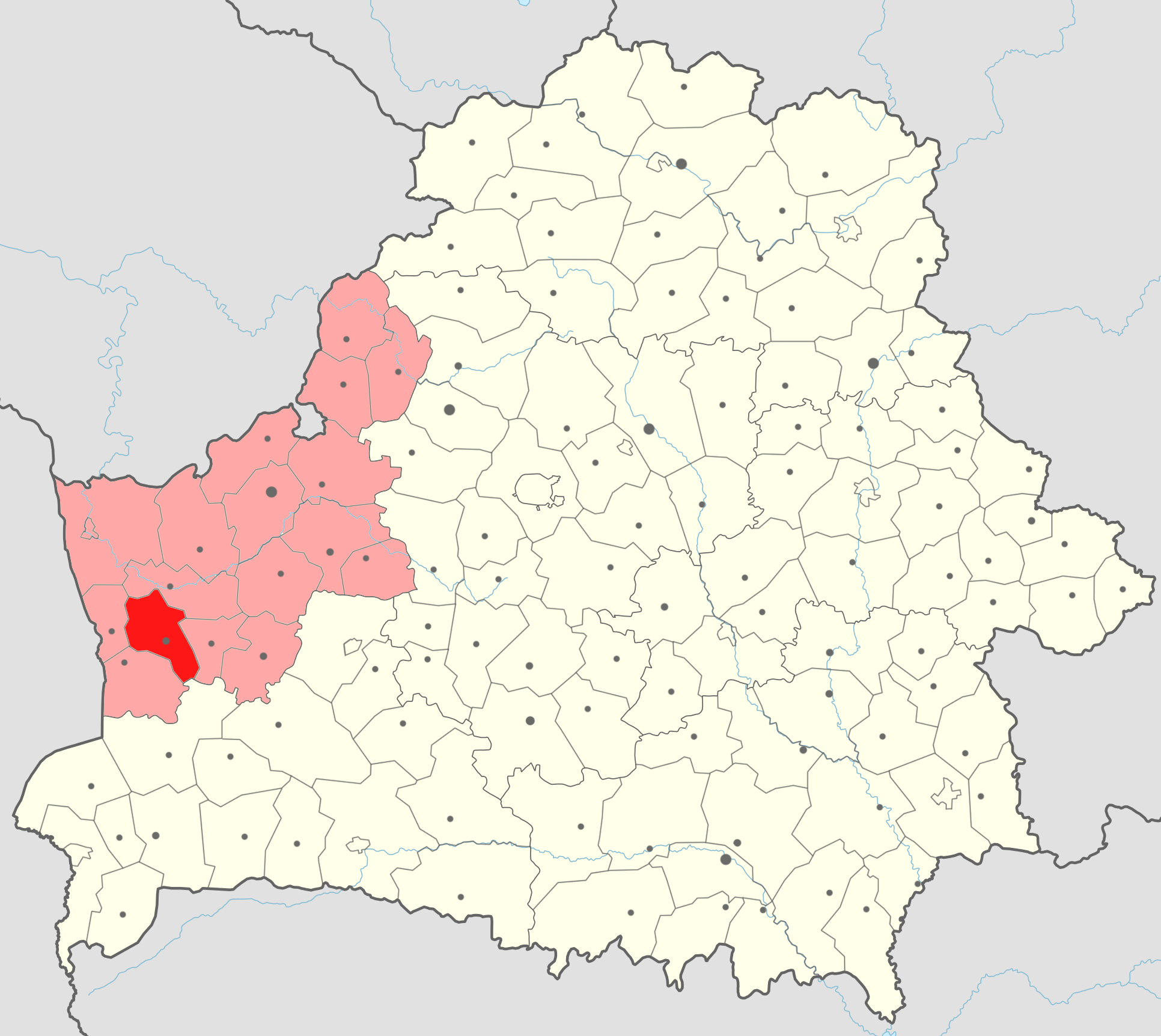
- Coordinates: 53°10′N 24°28′E
- Country: Belarus
- Region: Grodno region
- Administrative center: Vawkavysk

Area
  - District: 1,192.85 km^{2} (460.56 sq mi)

Population (2024)
  - District: 64,036
  - Density: 53.683/km^{2} (139.04/sq mi)
  - Urban: 51,676
  - Rural: 12,360
- Time zone: UTC+3 (MSK)

Vawkavysk district or Vaŭkavysk district (Belarusian: Ваўкавыскі раён; Russian: Волковысский район) is a district (raion) of Grodno region in Belarus. The administrative center is Vawkavysk. As of 2024, it has a population of 64,036.

== Notable residents ==
- Larysa Hienijuš (1910, Žlobaǔcy estate – 1983), Belarusian poet, writer and active participant of the national movement
