= Orsha district =

District of Vitebsk region, Belarus

Orsha district Аршанскі раён (Belarusian)
- District
- Flag Coat of arms

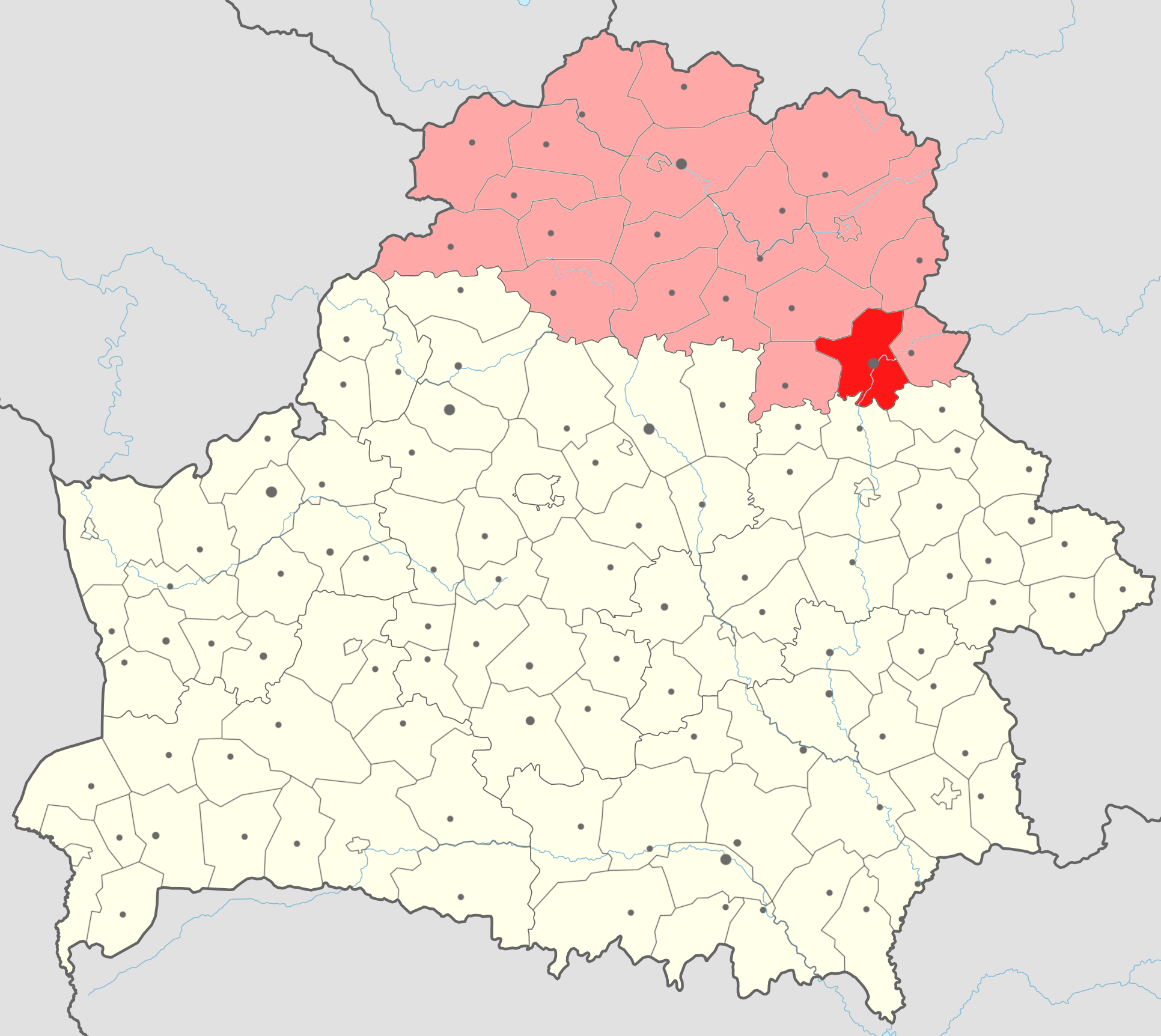
- Coordinates: 54°30′N 30°24′E
- Country: Belarus
- Region: Vitebsk region
- Administrative center: Orsha

Area
  - Total: 1,667.73 km^{2} (643.91 sq mi)
- Elevation: 171 m (561 ft)

Population (2023)
  - Total: 142,331
  - Density: 85.3442/km^{2} (221.040/sq mi)
- Time zone: UTC+3 (MSK)

Orsha district or Orša district (Belarusian: Аршанскі раён; Russian: Оршанский район, romanized: Orshansky rayon) is a district (raion) of Vitebsk region in Belarus. The administrative center of the district is Orsha.
