= Gomel district =

District of Gomel region, Belarus

Gomel district Гомельскі раён (Belarusian) Гомельский район (Russian)
- District
- Flag Coat of arms

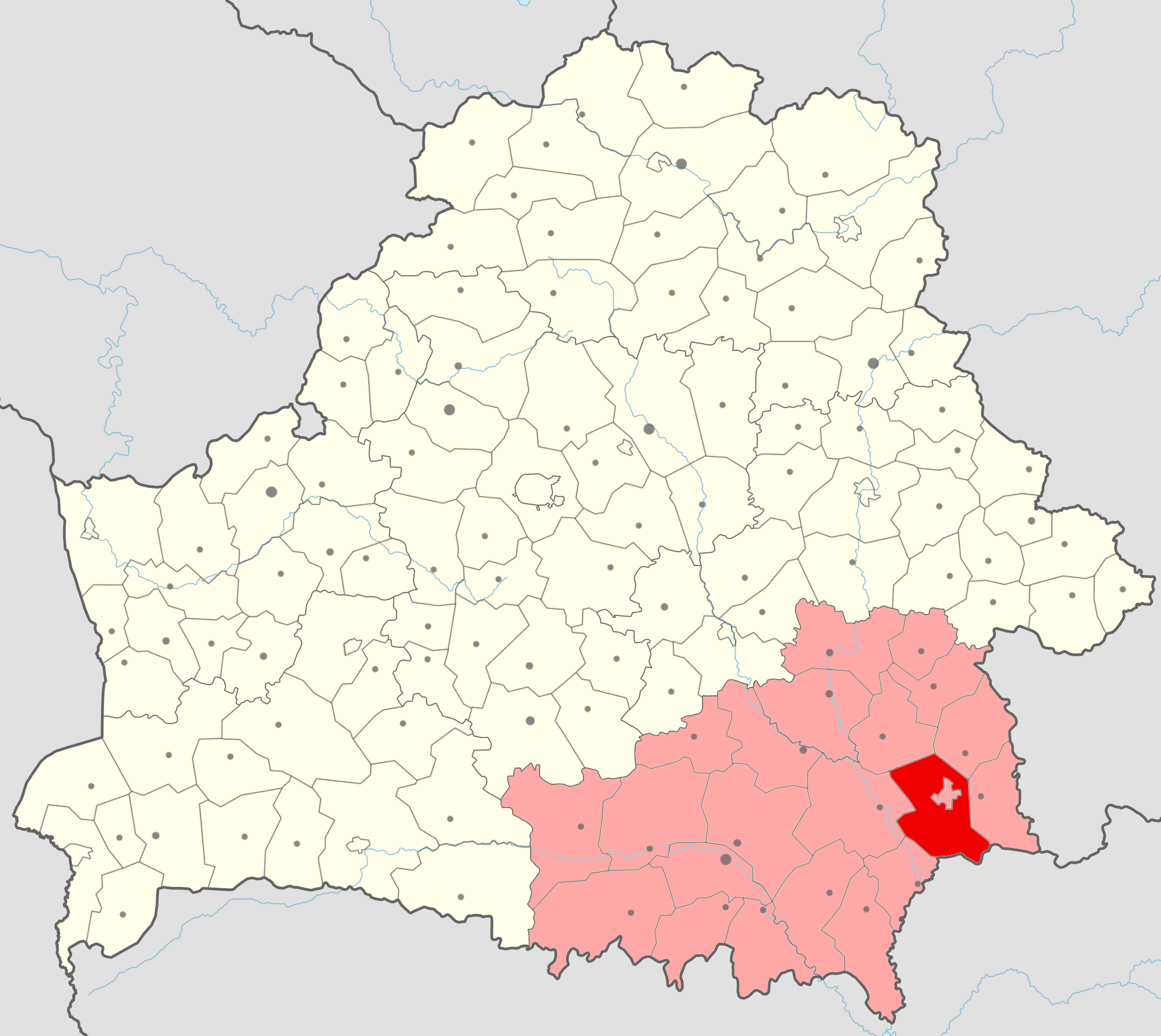
- Coordinates: 52°25′27″N 31°00′48″E
- Country: Belarus
- Region: Gomel region
- Administrative center: Gomel

Area
  - Total: 1,951.40 km^{2} (753.44 sq mi)

Population (2024)
  - Total: 69,015
  - Density: 35.367/km^{2} (91.600/sq mi)
- Time zone: UTC+3 (MSK)

Gomel district or Homyel district (Belarusian: Гомельскі раён, romanized: Homieĺski rajon; Russian: Гомельский район) is a district (raion) of Gomel Region in Belarus. Its administrative center is Gomel, which is administratively separated from the district. As of 2024, it has a population of 69,015. Economically, the Gomel Region, which includes the Gomel District, is a major industrial and agricultural hub in Belarus. The core economy encompasses agriculture, forestry, and manufacturing.

== History ==
The territory that constitutes the Gomel Region, including what is the Gomel District, has a long history of human habitation, with archaeological evidence dating back to the Middle Paleolithic era (100,000-40,000 years ago). The city of Gomel, the administrative center, was first mentioned in 1142 as "Gomiy" in the Hypatian Chronicle. Around 1335, Gomel became part of the Grand Duchy of Lithuania. The district, as an administrative unit, evolved through various historical periods, including parts of the Polish-Lithuanian Commonwealth, the Russian Empire, and the Soviet Union. The region was particularly affected by the Second World War and later by the Chernobyl disaster in 1986, suffering massive environmental damage with radioactive contamination and abandonment. Large portions of land were taken out of use and village/city populations were resettled due to radiation.

== Geography ==
Gomel District is situated in the southeastern part of Belarus, within the larger Gomel Region. The district shares borders with other districts within the Gomel Region and, through the broader region, borders Ukraine to the south and southeast, and Russia to the east. The Sozh River flows through the region, and its tributaries and associated floodplains are prominent geographical features. The topography of Gomel District, being part of the Eastern European Plain, is generally flat with eroded hills and uplands. The district's landscape is characterized by a mix of forests, agricultural lands, and river systems.

== Demographics ==
The population was 69,015 as of 2024, which was 69,930 in the 2009 census. The larger Gomel Region’s total population is approximately 1.4 million. The regional economy includes agriculture, forestry, light manufacturing, and services. The larger Gomel Region is a significant economic center in Belarus, accounting for nearly 19% of the country's industrial production as of preliminary data for 2024.
