= Svyetlahorsk district =

District of Gomel region, Belarus

Coordinates: 52.6333°N 29.7333°E

Svyetlahorsk district Светлагорскі раён (Belarusian) Светлогорский район (Russian)
- District
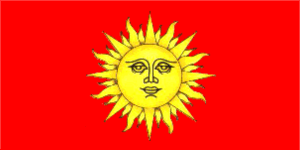
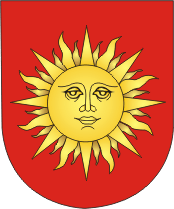
- Flag Coat of arms

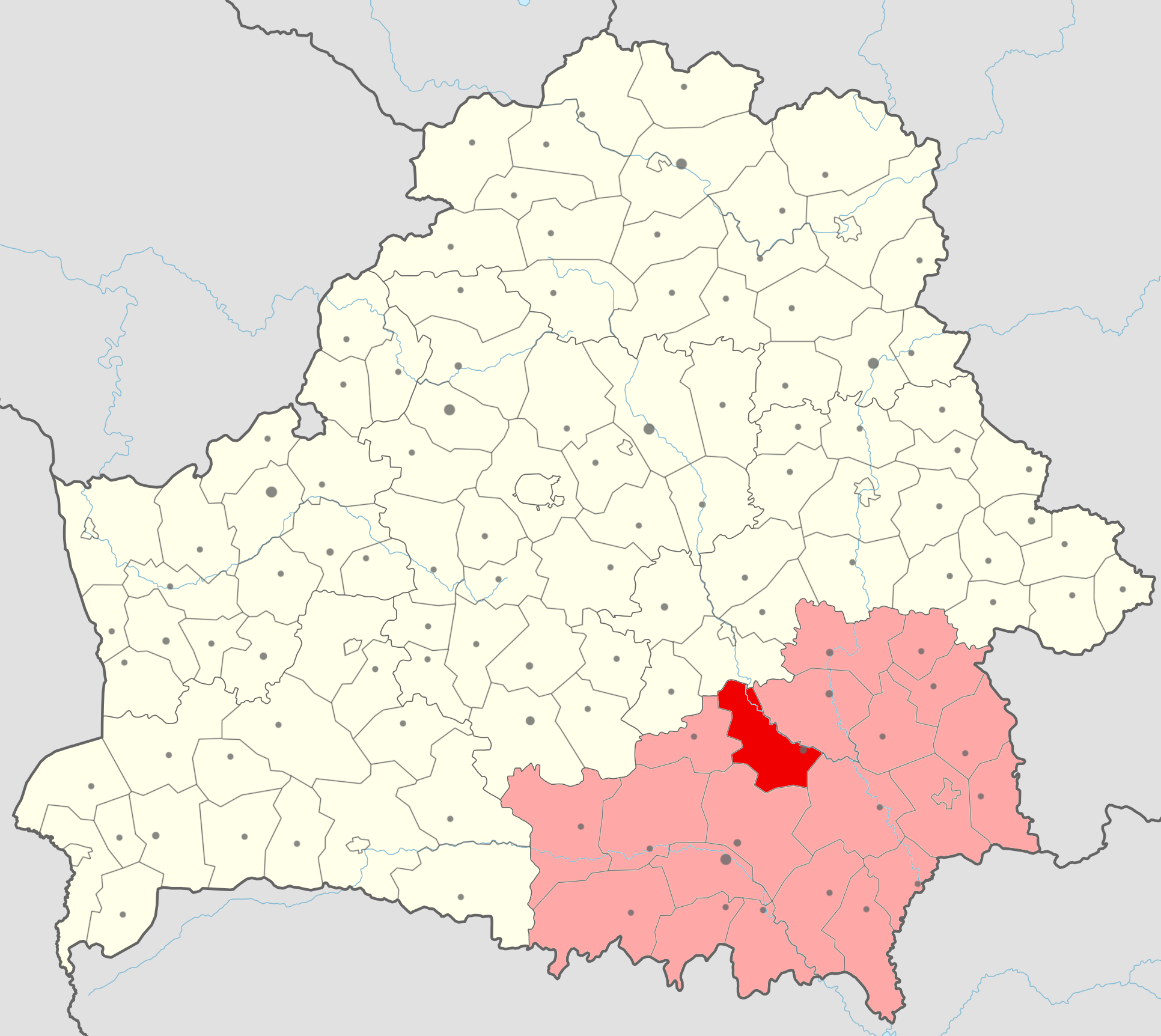
- Country: Belarus
- Region: Gomel region
- Administrative center: Svyetlahorsk

Area
  - Total: 1,899.91 km^{2} (733.56 sq mi)

Population (2024)
  - Total: 75,845
  - Density: 39.920/km^{2} (103.39/sq mi)
- Time zone: UTC+3 (MSK)

Svyetlahorsk district or Svietlahorsk district (Belarusian: Светлагорскі раён, romanized: Svietlahorski rajon; Russian: Светлогорский район) is a district (raion) of Gomel region in Belarus. Its administrative center is Svyetlahorsk. As of 2024, it has a population of 75,845.

== Notable residents ==
- Ihar Hermianchuk (1961, Strakavičy village – 2002), journalist and political activist
- Ściapan Niekraševič (1883, the estate of Daniłoŭka – 1937), academic, political figure and a victim of Stalin’s purges
