= Lyelchytsy district =

District of Gomel region, Belarus

Coordinates: 51°47′09″N 28°19′29″E

Lyelchytsy district Лельчыцкі раён (Belarusian) Лельчицкий район (Russian)
- District
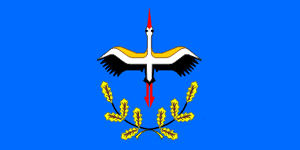
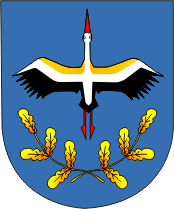
- Flag Coat of arms

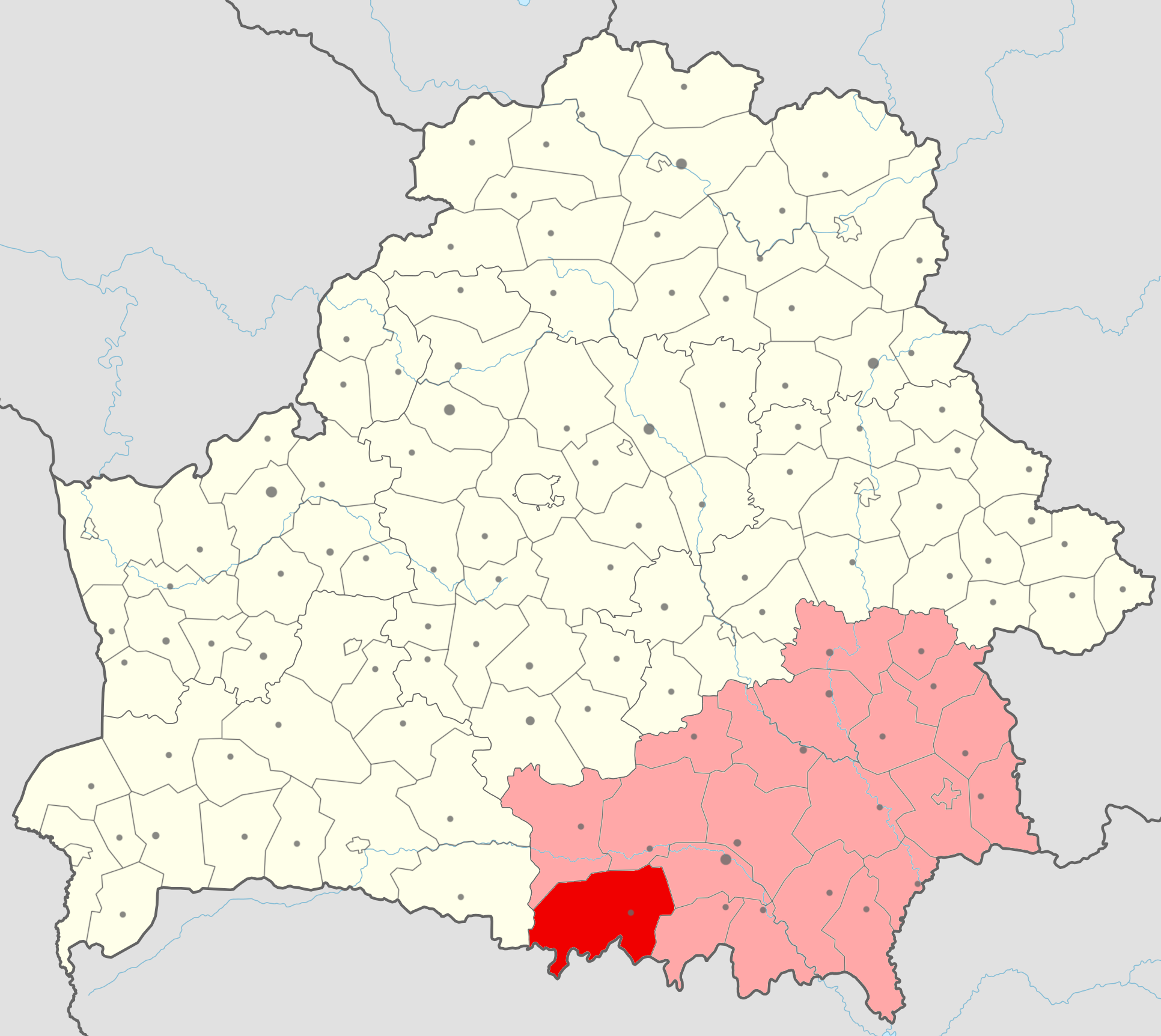
- Country: Belarus
- Region: Gomel region
- Administrative center: Lyelchytsy

Government
  - Chairman: Anatoly Gaponik

Area
  - District: 3,221.31 km^{2} (1,243.75 sq mi)

Population (2024)
  - District: 23,600
  - Density: 7.33/km^{2} (19.0/sq mi)
  - Urban: 12,334
  - Rural: 11,266

Demographics
  - Belarusians: 96.78%
  - Russians: 1.70%
  - Ukrainians: 1.05%
  - Other: 0.48%
- Time zone: UTC+3 (MSK)
- Rural councils: 12
- Settlements: 73
- Website: Official website

Lyelchytsy district (Belarusian: Лельчыцкі раён, romanized: Lieĺčycki rajon; Russian: Лельчицкий район, romanized: Lel'chitskiy rayon) is a district (raion) of Gomel region in Belarus. Its administrative center is Lyelchytsy. As of 2024, it has a population of 23,600.

== History ==
The district was created on 17 July 1924 during early Soviet administrative reforms and frequently changed status in the first three decades of its existence. Originally formed from the Buynavichy and Lyelchytsy townships (volosts) of the abolished Mazyr Uyezd, the district belonged to the newly established Mazyr Okrug of the Byelorussian Soviet Socialist Republic (BSSR) until 1930, when Mazyr Okrug was dissolved. From 1930 to 1935 the district was a first-order subdivision of the BSSR.

At the time of its creation in 1924, the district had 12 village councils, 147 settlements, 4,913 farms, and 27,664 residents. The village of Lyelchytsy contained 306 farms and 1,659 residents.

In 1935, the Mazyr Okrug was reinstated and Lyelchytsy rejoined. New administrative reforms in 1938 introducing regions dissolved Mazyr Okrug again, created the Polesia Region, and transferred Lyelchytsy to the new region. The settlement of Lyelchytsy was granted urban-type settlement status in 1938.

During the German occupation of World War II from 1941 to 1944, the district was annexed to the Reichskommissariat Ukraine with its administrative center in Rivne. After the war, the district returned to Polesia Region, to which it remained until 1954, when the present-day Gomel Region was created.

The district was dissolved for several years in the 1960s, being abolished in December 1962 and reinstated in January 1965. It has been a district of Belarus since its independence from the USSR in 1991.

== Geography ==
The area of the district is 3,221 km^{2} (1,244 sq mi). The district is heavily forested and wet, with 69.5% forest land cover and 11.1% marsh land cover as of 2010. It is bordered in the north by Zhytkavichy and Pyetrykaw districts, in the east by Mazyr and Yelsk districts, in the west by Stolin district of Brest region, and in the south by the Zhytomyr and Rivne oblasts of Ukraine. The main river is the Ubort, a tributary of the Pripyat River.

== Demographics ==
The population of the district was 23,993 as of 2017, with 11,393 living in Lyelchytsy and 12,600 living in rural settlements. The population density of the district is 7.4 km^{2} (2.9 sq mi). The ethnic composition in the 2009 census was 96.8% Belarusian, 1.7% Russian, and 1.1% Ukrainian. The district's population has been in decline since the 1970s, though the urban settlement of Lyelchytsy has grown over the same period.

The district was affected by the 1986 Chernobyl disaster because of its proximity. About 650 people were resettled out of the district from 1986 to 1999 as part of the resulting resettlement program.

Historical population
Year	Pop.	±%
1959	40,135	—
1970	43,939	+9.5%
1979	38,675	−12.0%
1989	33,797	−12.6%
1999	31,964	−5.4%
2009	27,722	−13.3%
2017	23,993	−13.5%

== Administrative divisions ==
The district contains twelve rural councils and one urban settlement, containing a total of 73 villages. The rural councils of Hrabianioŭski and Astrazhanski have been abolished since 2009 and their settlements incorporated into the other councils.

English name	Belarusian Name	Russian name	Type	Villages	Population 2009
Lieĺčycki	Лельчыцкі	Лельчицкий	urban settlement		10,606
Bujnavicki	Буйнавіцкі	Буйновичский	rural council	11	1,684
Bukčanski	Букчанскі	Букчанский	rural council	2	669
Hluškievicki	Глушкевіцкі	Глушковичский	rural council	1	2,101
Hrabianioŭski	Грабянёўскі	Гребенёвский	rural council	9	528
Dziarzhynski	Дзяржынскі	Дзержинский	rural council	1	812
Dubroŭski	Дуброўскі	Дубровский	rural council	7	1,014
Udarnienski	Ударненскі	Ударненский	rural council	7	1,546
Lieĺčycki	Лельчыцкі	Лельчицкий	rural council	6	1,799
Baraŭski	Бараўскі	Боровской	rural council	7	1,629
Milaševicki	Мілашэвіцкі	Милошевичский	rural council	2	1,847
Astrazhanski	Астражанскі	Острожанский	rural council	6	443
Simanicki	Сіманіцкі	Симоничский	rural council	6	1,094
Stadolicki	Стадоліцкі	Стодоличский	rural council	3	802
Toniežski	Тонежскі	Тонежский	rural council	5	1,148
