= The Holocaust in Chachersk district =

The Holocaust in Chachersk district was the ghettoization and genocide of the Jews and Romani people mainly in the Belarusian shtetl of Chachersk, as well as in the greater Chachersk District located inside the Gomel Oblast during the Holocaust. Invading Soviet-controlled Belarus as a part of Operation Barbarossa, Nazi Germany subjected Chachersk and neighboring shtetls to systematic extermination. Entire Jewish and Romani populations in the region were rounded up in Nazi-organized ghettos and later murdered, in one of the earliest phases of the Final Solution.

== Background ==
Before becoming a part of the Russian Soviet Federative Socialist Republic in 1919, Chachersk was a part of the Pale of Settlement, the only section of the Russian Empire in which Jews could permanently live. Thus, Eastern Belarus had a large Jewish population, with the January 1939 Soviet census estimating the Jewish population of the region at 375,000 people. The 1939 census further estimated the Jewish population of the Gomel Oblast at 62,146 inhabitants, and the population of the shtetl of Chachersk at around 977 Jews.

== Operation Barbarossa and evacuation ==
On June 22, 1941, Nazi Germany invaded the Soviet Union in Operation Barbarossa, incited by Adolf Hitler's desire to expand Nazi Germany by gaining Lebensraum for the German people. Nazi ideology dictated that in order for the so-called "Aryan race" to thrive and multiply in newly captured land, it must first be rid of "life unworthy of life". Since Chachersk had a predominantly Jewish population, as well as a substantial concentration of Romani people, it would be a prime target for genocide. German troops invaded Eastern Belarus and the Gomel Oblast, but were staved off by fierce resistance from partisans and Red Army units, who briefly halted the German advance. However, they were ultimately unsuccessful in defeating the Nazis, as the last pockets of Soviet and partisan resistance were dispatched in August and September 1941, leaving the Jews of Gomel Oblast defenseless and subject to the whims of the Germans. Hearing word of the imminent advance of the Wehrmacht and of Nazi atrocities, the Jews of Chachersk organized a mass evacuation, which proved successful. The majority of the Jewish inhabitants were evacuated from the shtetl, and around 200 remained when the Germans occupied Chachersk and the surrounding area.

== Ghettoization and liquidation ==
Chachersk was captured by the Nazis on August 14, 1941, and as with the rest of the Gomel Oblast, was put under the jurisdiction of the rear of Army Group Center, commanded by General der Infanterie Max von Schenckendorff. A ghetto in the shtetl of Chachersk was immediately established for the remaining 200 Jews in September 1941. Like the numerous other ghettos in Nazi-controlled Europe, living conditions in the Chachersk Ghetto were inhumane and many Jews who disobeyed the Germans were locked away in prisons, where they died of starvation. As months went by, the Nazis started to gradually murder the Jewish population of Chachersk; in late November 1941, 80 Jews were rounded up and were executed in an anti-tank ditch. On December 28, 1941, the ghetto of Chechersk was liquidated, on the orders of General Schenckendorff. The Jews of Chechersk and local Romani people were shot and buried together in a mass grave, in an Aktion that murdered a total of 432 people. While most of the Jews and Romani were shot, the elderly, the frail and some women and children were strangled to death, as these victims were sickly and could be easily murdered without the effort of rounding them up and shooting them. Einsatzgruppen death squads, Wehrmacht soldiers and Belarusian Auxiliary Police worked in conjunction to exterminate the Jews and Romani, and the rank-and-file army units were reported to show full participation in the murders. The Belarusian Auxiliary Police displayed exceptional cruelty, and often searched for hiding Jews after the mass-murders had taken place.
