= Orlytsia =

- Native name: Орлиця (Ukrainian)

Location
- Country: Ukraine
- Region: Zviahel Raion of Zhytomyr Oblast

Physical characteristics
- Source: Kalynske marsh
  - coordinates: 50°46′4″N 27°52′40″E
- Mouth: Ubort
  - coordinates: 50°46′50″N 27°57′52″E
- Length: ~8 км

Orlytsia (Ukrainian: Орлиця) is a river in Zviahel Raion of Zhytomyr Oblast, Ukraine. It is a right tributary of the Ubort (which flows into the Pripyat). The river length is about 8 kilometers.

== Geography ==
It originates from the Kalynske marsh, near the granite hills in the village of Velykyi Yablunets, at the watershed with the Uzh. It flows mainly in southern outskirts of the Virivka village and flows into the Ubort River, the right tributary of Pripyat.

On the left bank of the river is the village of Nepiznanychi, through which the northern limit of the distribution of glacial deposits passes. On the right bank is the village of Virivka, to the south of which there is a large hill with outcrops of granite, quartz and gneiss.
