= Augustine Markevich =

Belarusian-born Ukrainian Orthodox Metropolitan

His Eminence Augustine
- Metropolitan
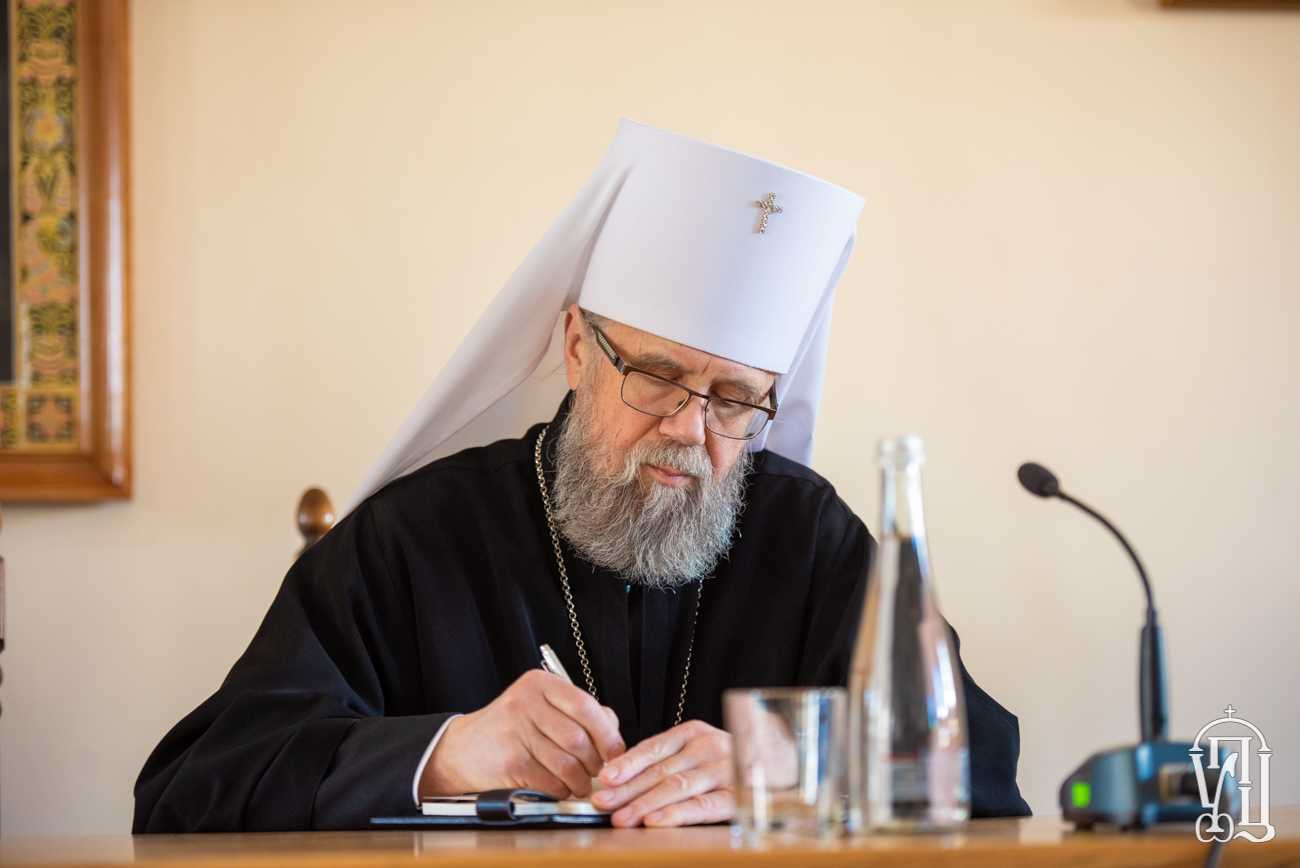
- Native name: Адам Іванавіч Маркевіч
- Church: Ukrainian Orthodox Church (Moscow Patriarchate)
- Diocese: Lviv and Drohobych (Galicia); Belotserkovsky and Boguslavsky
- Elected: September 16, 1993 (to diocese of Lviv and Drohobych); July 20, 2012 (to diocese of Belotserkovsky and Boguslavsky)
- Predecessor: Metropolitan Andrey (to diocese of Lviv and Drohobych); Metropolitan Mitrofan (to diocese of Belotserkovsky and Boguslavsky)
- Successor: Metropolitan Filaret (to diocese of Lviv and Galicia)

Orders
- Consecration: September 20, 1992 by Metropolitan Vladimir of Dmitrov
- Rank: Metropolitan

Personal details
- Born: Adam Ivanovich Markevich; April 7, 1952 (age 74) Gomel Oblast, Byelorussian SSR
- Education: Moscow Theological Academy
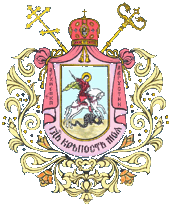
- Coat of arms

Augustine, born Adam Ivanovich Markevich (Belarusian: Аўгусціна/Адам Іванавіч Маркевіч) on April 7, 1952, in the Gomel Oblast, is a Belarusian metropolitan bishop of the diocese of Belotserkovsky and Boguslavsky under the semi-autonomous Ukrainian Orthodox Church. He also served as bishop of the Lviv and Drohobych (changed to Lviv and Galicia in 1998) diocese from September 16, 1993, until being transmigrated to the diocese at Belotserkovsky and Boguslavsky on July 20, 2012, where he continues to serve today. He holds Ukrainian, Belarusian, and Russian citizenship, but resides with his diocese in Ukraine.

== Early life and education ==
Markevich was born on April 7, 1952, in the Byelorussian SSR to what Markevich describes as "a priestly family", and in 1955 his father became a priest in Zhytomyr. His paternal grandfather was a soldier of the Red Army and had been killed during the Great Patriotic War. He graduated from high school in 1969 and subsequently studied medicine. In 1971, he graduated from medical school and moved to Ukraine, where he began working as a paramedic in Rivne. During this time, he also started studying theology at the Moscow Theological Academy. He obtained his doctorate in theology from the university in 1982.

== Clerical life ==
Augustine took monastic vows and was ordained as a deacon in 1975. A year later, in 1976, was ordained as a presbyter by Metropolitan Vladimir of Dmitrov. From 1978 to 1992, he served priestly duties in Korosten, until he was anointed Bishop of Lviv and Drohobych on September 16, 1993. In 1996, he became an ambassador for the Ukrainian Orthodox Church to the Ukrainian Armed Forces, a position he still holds today. In 1998, he was elevated to the rank of archbishop. In 2011, he consecrated the St. Volodymr Chapel in Antarctica. He was transmigrated to the diocese of Belotserkovsky and Boguslavsky on July 20, 2012, and was granted the rank of metropolitan a year later on November 23, 2013.

In September 2023 Augustine took part in a service and conference organized by clergy of the Russian Orthodox Church in Italy. In May 2022 a schism occurred within the Ukrainian Orthodox Church. A number of bishops declared full independence and autonomy from the Russian Orthodox Church and stated loyalty to an opposing metropolis although Augustine remains loyal to the Moscow Patriarchate.
