= Karma, Karma district, Gomel region =

Karma Карма (Belarusian)
- Urban-type settlement
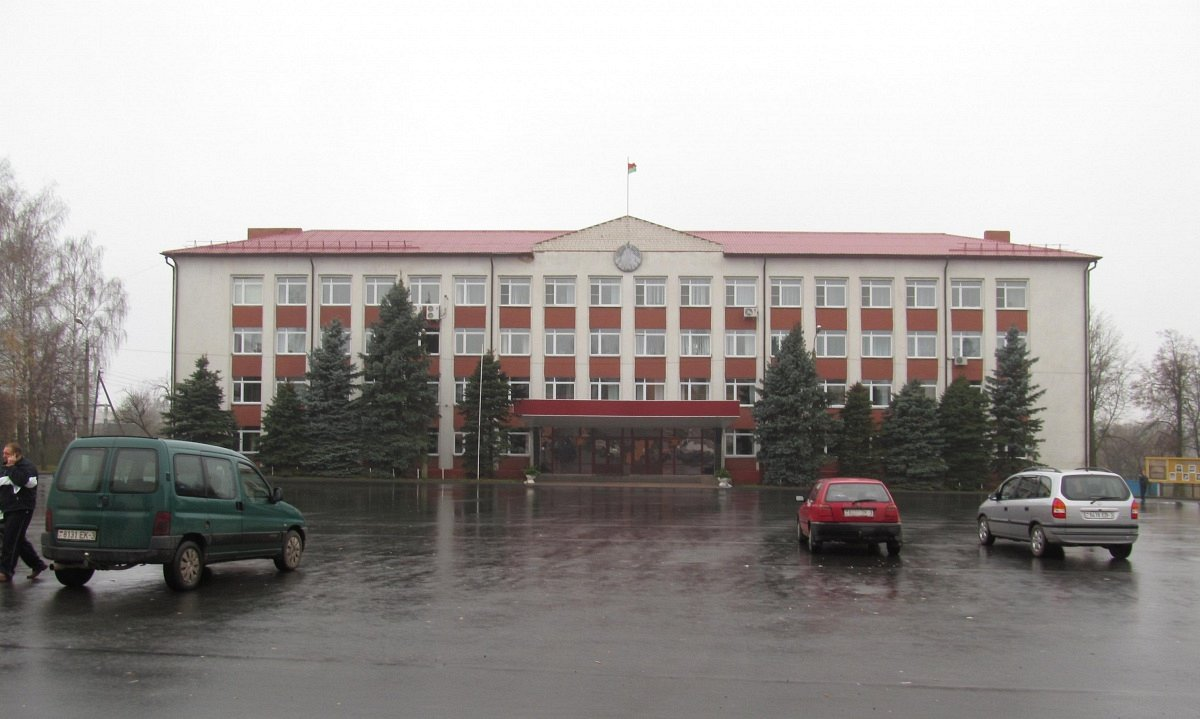

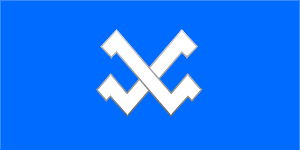
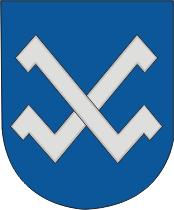
- Flag Coat of arms

- Location of Karma in Belarus
- Coordinates: 53°07′45″N 30°48′38″E
- Country: Belarus
- Region: Gomel Region
- District: Karma District
- Population (2025): 7,783
- Time zone: UTC+3 (MSK)

Karma (Belarusian: Карма; Russian: Корма, romanized: Korma) is an urban-type settlement in Gomel Region, Belarus. It serves as the administrative center of Karma District. As of 2025, it has a population of 7,783.
