= Sankovo-Medvezhye =

Russian exclave in Belarus

Coordinates: 52°29′N 31°33′E

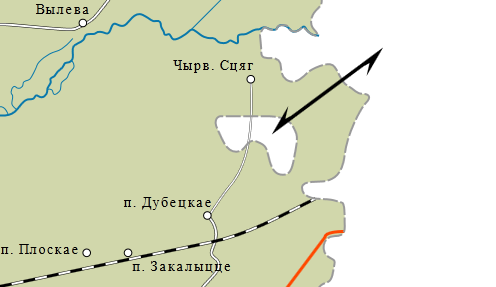
Sankovo-Medvezhye enclave

Sankovo-Medvezhye (Russian: Саньково-Медвежье; Belarusian: Санькова-Мядзвежжа, romanized: Sańkova-Miadzviežža) is an abandoned and radioactively polluted Russian exclave surrounded by Belarus (with an area of 454 hectares, 4.5 km^{2} or 1.7 sq mi). It is situated in the east of Dobrush District of Gomel Region, 5 km from the Russian village of Dobrodeyevka. Sankovo-Medvezhye is a part of Zlynkovsky District of Bryansk Oblast and is just 800 m (1/2 mi) from the Belarusian–Russian border, from which it is separated by marshes. The name of the exclave comes from the villages Sankovo and Medvezhye, which existed in this area during Soviet times.

== History ==
At the beginning of the 20th century settlers from the neighboring village of Dobrodeyevka left in search of jobs in the United States. Having worked as miners in Pennsylvania, they returned before World War I broke out. New farmers bought holdings and established individual farms.

In 1926, during the administrative reform, the state border between the Byelorussian Soviet Republic and Russian Soviet Republic was moved to the east but administratively the villages Sankovo and Medvezhye became a part of Russia's Bryansk Oblast.

During World War II, the Germans destroyed these villages, but after the war Russians re-settled the region.

== Current status ==
Due to the nuclear disaster that occurred in Chernobyl in 1986 this area is abandoned. Housing and any other activity are now completely forbidden.

The Russian Federation still officially has jurisdiction over the area.

== See also ==
- Kaliningrad Oblast
- Dubki, Pechorsky District, Pskov Oblast
