= Brinevskoye mine =

Gypsum mine in Belarus

- Location: Gomel Region, Belarus
- Products: Gypsum

The Brinevskoye mine is one of the largest gypsum mines in Belarus. The mine is located in the Gomel Region. The mine has reserves amounting to 182.5 million tonnes of gypsum.
