= Lyelchytsy =

Lyelchytsy Лельчыцы (Belarusian)
- Urban-type settlement
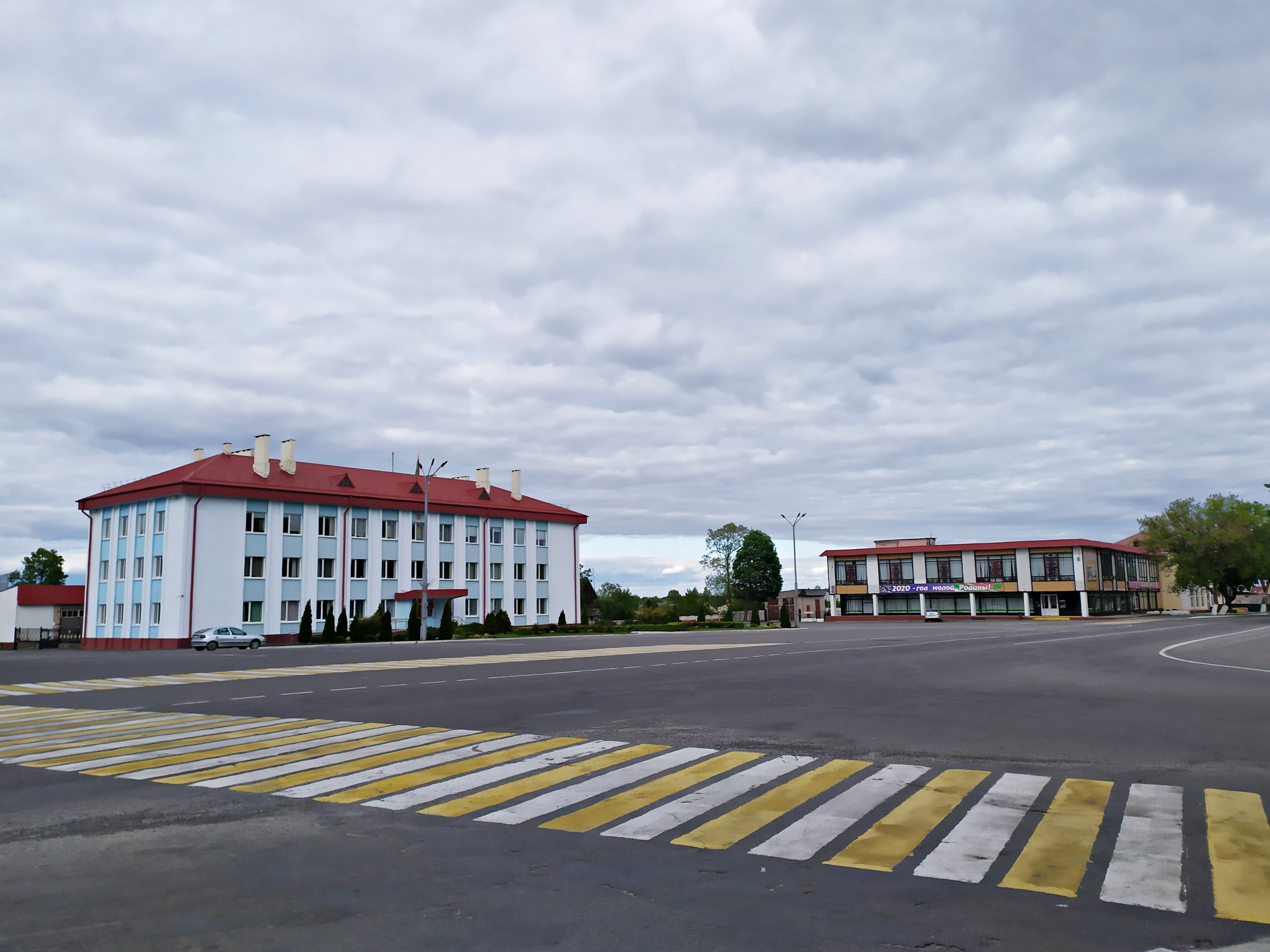

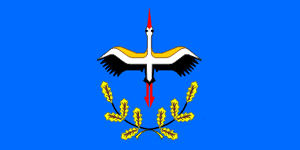
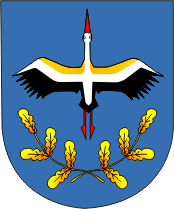
- Flag Seal

- Location within Belarus
- Coordinates: 51°47′22″N 28°19′17″E
- Country: Belarus
- Region: Gomel Region
- District: Lyelchytsy District

Population (2025)
  - Total: 12,243
- Time zone: UTC+3 (MSK)

Lyelchytsy (Belarusian: Лельчыцы, romanized: Lieĺčycy; Russian: Лельчицы, romanized: Lelchitsy; Polish: Lelczyce) is an urban-type settlement in Gomel Region, in southern Belarus. It serves as the administrative center of Lyelchytsy District. As of 2025, it has a population of 12,243.

Lyelchytsy is located by the Ubort River, 251 kilometres (156 mi) southwest of Gomel.

== History ==
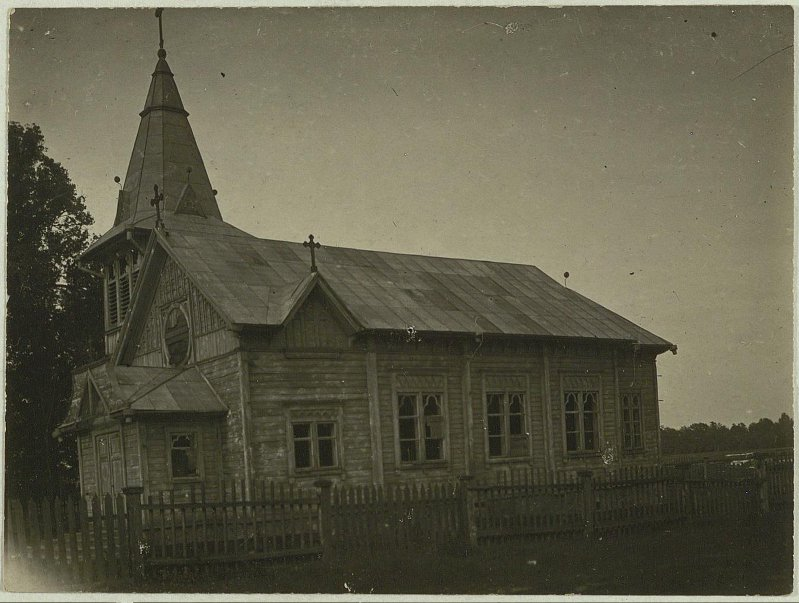
Former Catholic church in 1932

During World War II, the town was occupied by German troops in late August 1941. In September 1941 and in early spring 1942, local policemen and German gendarmes murdered Jews of the town in several mass executions. Many hidden Jews were later caught and then shot. Then, the Jewish houses were also plundered. The last remaining Jews were shot in summer 1942, along with Soviet citizens, under the pretext of having links to the partisans.

== Monuments ==
Monument to soldiers-internationalists who died in the Soviet–Afghan War, opened in July 2013.

== Notable people ==
- Ekaterina Slobozhanina (born 1945). Belarusian scientist specializing in photobiology and membrane biophysics. She has authored over 450 scientific papers, including five monographs and 13 patents. She has developed a number of rapid methods for photographic diagnostics of diseases.
