= Barshchowka Selsoviet =

- Location within Belarus
- Coordinates: 52°12′44″N 31°33′50″E
- Country: Belarus
- Region: Gomel Region
- District: Dobrush District
- Founded: December 8, 1926

Area
  - Total: 26.9 km^{2} (10.4 sq mi)

Population (2009)
  - Total: 664
- Time zone: UTC+3 (MSK)
- Postal code: 247050
- Area code: +375 2333

Barshchowka Selsoviet is a lower-level subdivision (selsoviet) of Dobrush District, Gomel Region, Belarus.

== Settlements ==
Barshchowka Selsoviet contains one settlement:

- Barshchowka
