= Yelsk, Belarus =

Town in Gomel Region, Belarus

Yelsk Ельск
- Town
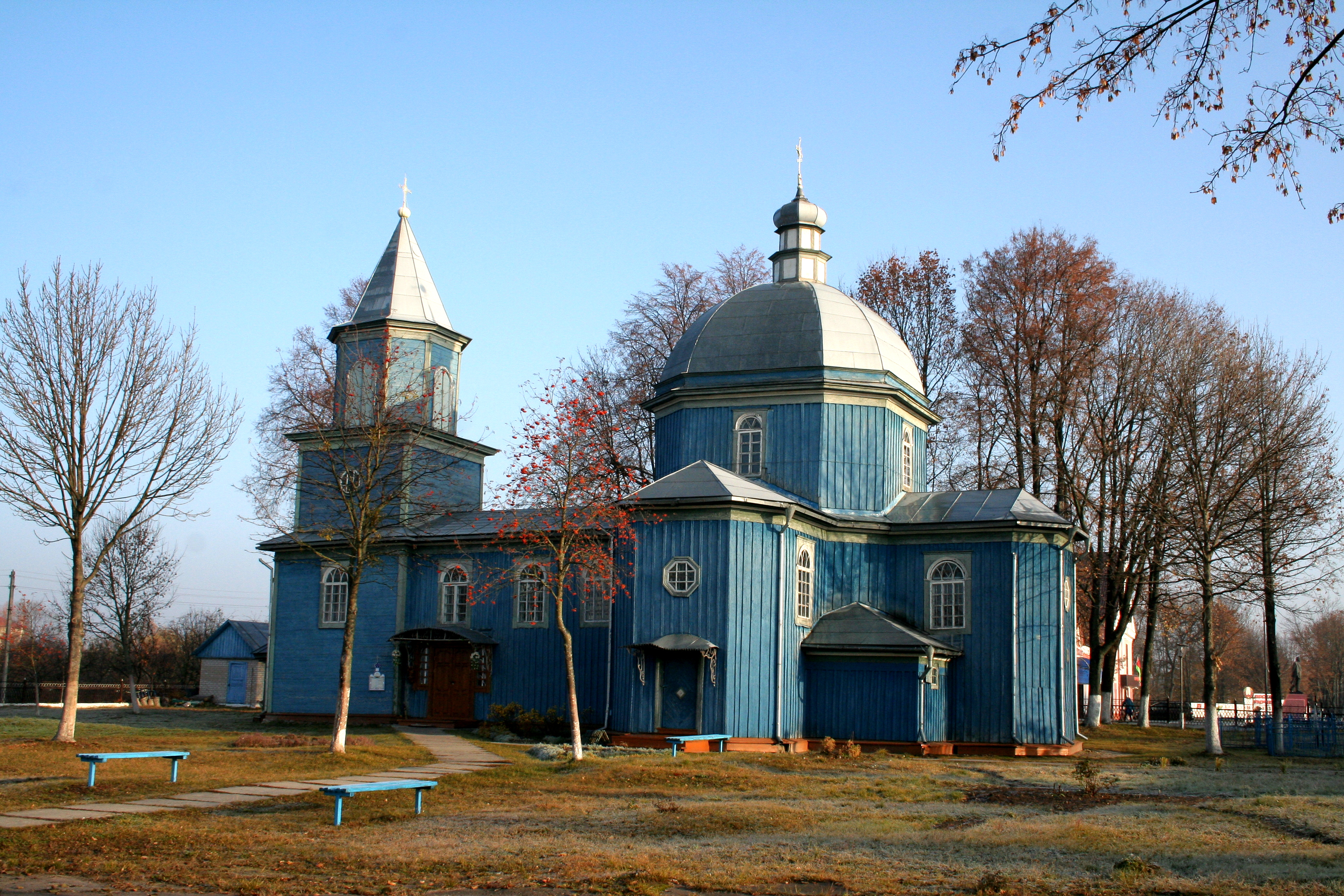
- Holy Trinity church

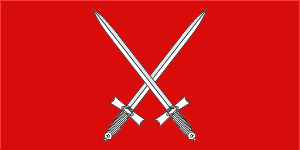
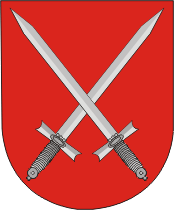
- Flag Coat of arms

- Location within Belarus
- Coordinates: 51°49′N 29°09′E
- Country: Belarus
- Region: Gomel Region
- District: Yelsk District

Population (2025)
  - Total: 8,623
- Time zone: UTC+3 (MSK)
- Postal code: 247831, 247872, 247873
- Area code: +375 2354
- License plate: 3

Yelsk (Note: Belarusian: Ельск, romanized: Jeĺsk; Russian: Ельск; Polish: Jelsk.) is a town in Gomel Region, in southern Belarus. It serves as the administrative center of Yelsk District. As of 2025, it has a population of 8,623. It is located in the historic region of Polesia.

== History ==
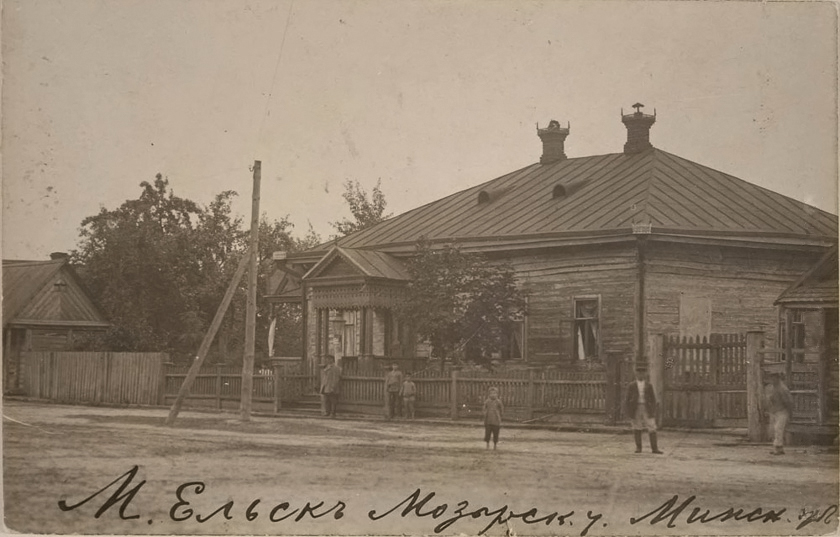
Early-20th-century photo from Yelsk

Jelsk was a private town within the Polish–Lithuanian Commonwealth. In the 16th century, it became a possession of the Spads, a family of French religious refugees who then took the name Jelski after the town.

During World War II, the town was occupied by German troops during summer 1941. The local Jews were gathered and deported towards Kalinkovichi and Mozyr. Approximately two weeks after the departure of the Jews of Yelsk, the Jews of the nearby Jewish village of Skorodnoye were brought in and locked inside a building. Then, the Germans set fire to the building all the Jews were burned alive.
