= Dobrush =

Town in Gomel Region, Belarus

Dobrush Добруш
- Town
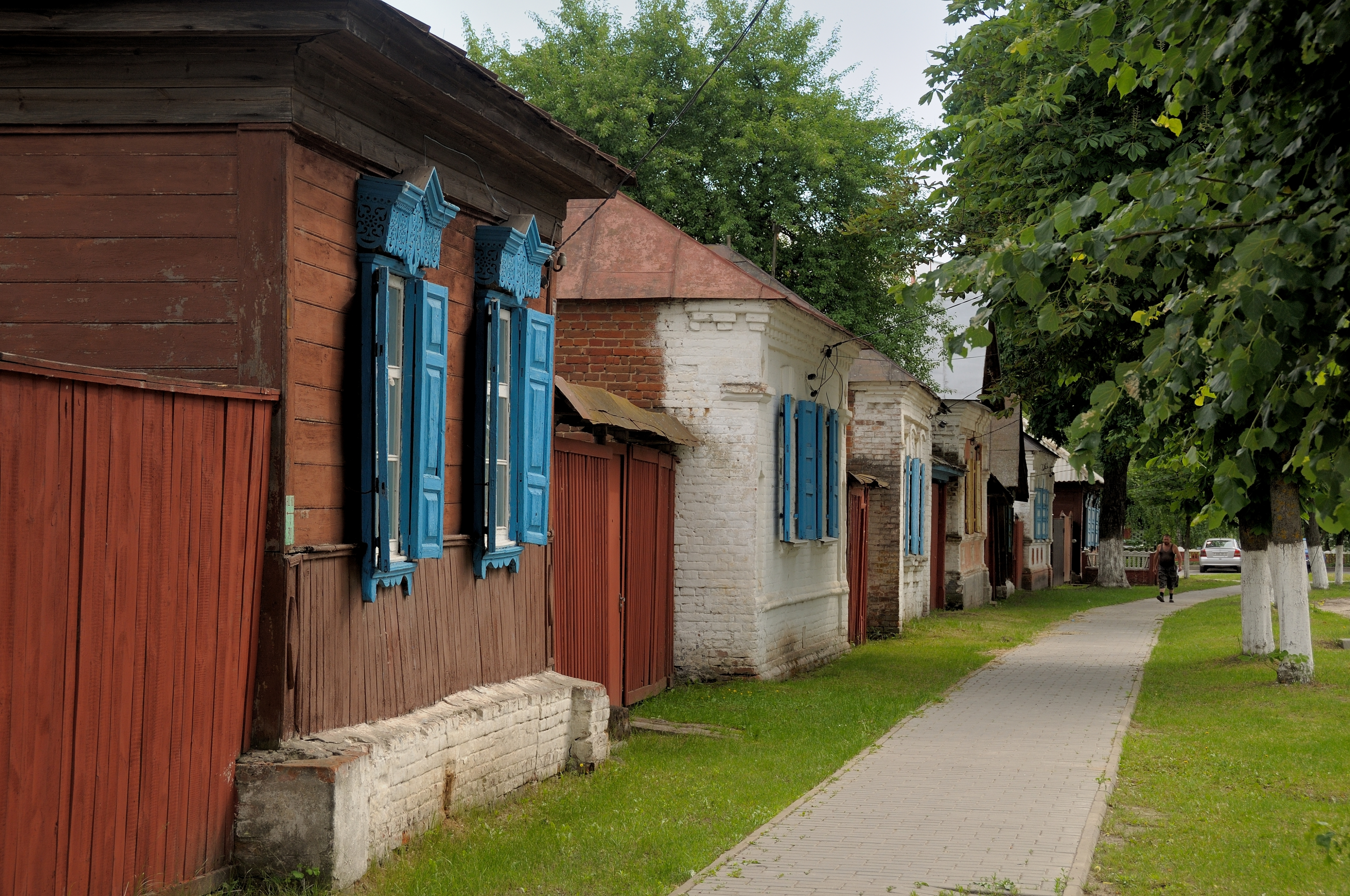

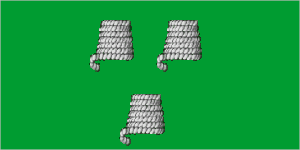
- Flag Coat of arms

- Location within Belarus
- Coordinates: 52°25′N 31°19′E
- Country: Belarus
- Region: Gomel Region
- District: Dobrush District

Population (2025)
  - Total: 17,901
- Time zone: UTC+3 (MSK)
- Postal code: 247050
- Area code: +375 2333
- License plate: 3

Dobrush (Belarusian: Добруш, IPA: [ˈdɔbruʂ]; Russian: Добруш) is a town located in Gomel Region, Belarus. It is located on the Iput River. It serves as the administrative center of Dobrush District. As of 2025, it has a population of 17,901. Dobrush is first mentioned in 1335.

Dobruh is governed by a Regional Executive Committee, the chairman of which is Volha Mokharava.

== History ==
On November 21, 1941, 106 local Jews and 19 Soviet activists were murdered in a mass execution perpetrated by Einsatzkommando 8, coming from Gomel, assisted by local policemen. During the spring of 1942, another execution took place in which about 70 Jews were also killed.

== Mass media ==
The Dobrush Region newspaper is published in Dobrush.

== Сulture ==
In Dobrush there are the State Institution "Dobrush Regional Palace of Culture", GDK "Meliorator", Dobrush Public and the Cultural Center. Also in Dobrush, there is a regional children's library. The Dobrush Regional Museum of Local Lore has been operating since 2002. In addition to all this, the Voskhod Cinema (3D) operates in Dobrush.
On November 13, 2021, the regional qualifying round of the XIII Republican Festival of National Cultures was held in Dobrush.
In 2022, the 29th Day of Belarusian Writing will be held in Dobrush.

== Industry ==
Dobrush is home to the first and only porcelain tableware factory in Belarus. Construction began in 1975, but the official founding date is December 28, 1978, the date the first product was launched and manufactured.

Another local enterprise, the "Hero of Labor" Paper Factory in Dobrush, is well known among the locals. It is one of the oldest and largest enterprises in the paper industry, operating for over 150 years. It was founded in 1870 by Adjutant General Fyodor Paskevich. The factory was the first in the Russian Empire to introduce many innovations: in 1882, the first laboratory in what is now Belarus opened there, and in 1889, the first Belarusian power plant was built, predating the arrival of electricity in Minsk by five years. By this time, electric motors and lighting were already being used in Dobrush, replacing dangerous kerosene stoves. Telephone and telegraph lines were installed at the factory. The Dobrush paper factory established itself as one of the most modern in Europe and was twice awarded the right to use the state emblem of the Russian Empire on its products. In 1894, an eight-hour workday was introduced here, replacing the 12-hour one, while employees retained their previous wages. Similar achievements were unimaginable at other factories. Anton Stulginsky's contributions to his workers were so significant that residents named one of the districts of Dobrush after his director – Antonovka.

During World War I, the factory suffered a decline: by 1919, only one of its five paper-making machines was operational. The Dobrush Paper Factory continued to operate as a state-owned enterprise. In 1922, it was awarded the title "Hero of Labor." Between the 1950s and 1970s, the factory underwent significant modernization and began to meet almost 70% of the USSR's needs for drafting and drawing paper. One in seven schoolchildren in the Soviet Union wrote in notebooks produced in Dobrush.

The buildings of the industrial complex have survived to this day and are included in the list of historical and cultural heritage sites of the Republic of Belarus.

== Gallery ==
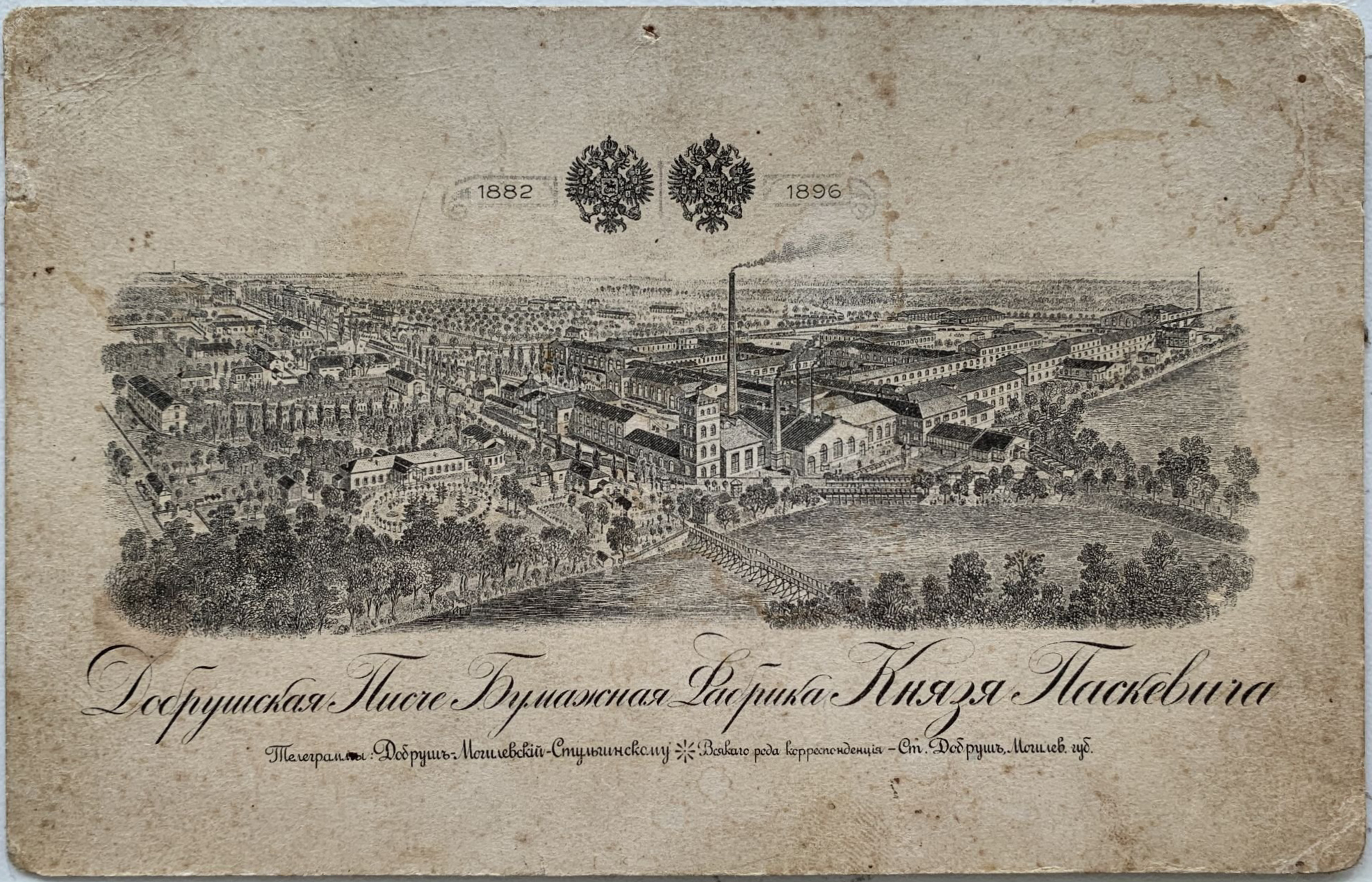
Paper Factory in Dobrush, 1895

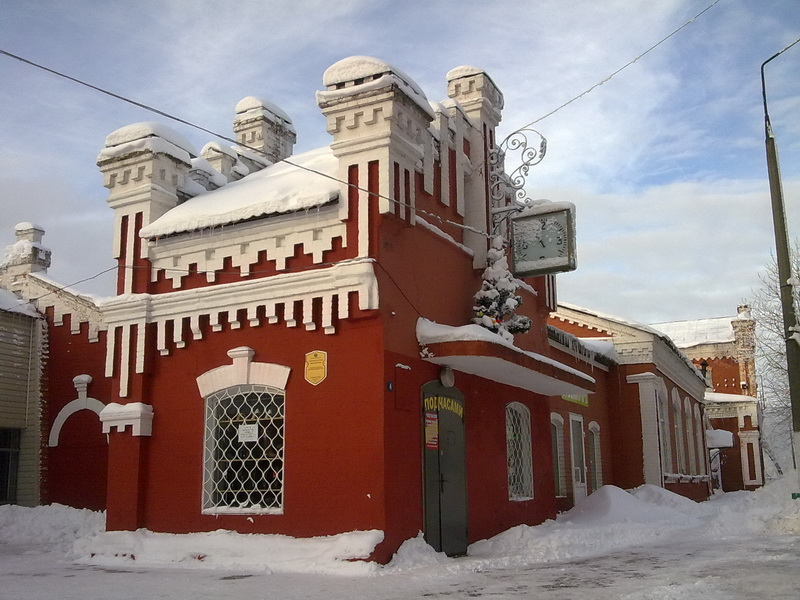
Paper Factory, 2010

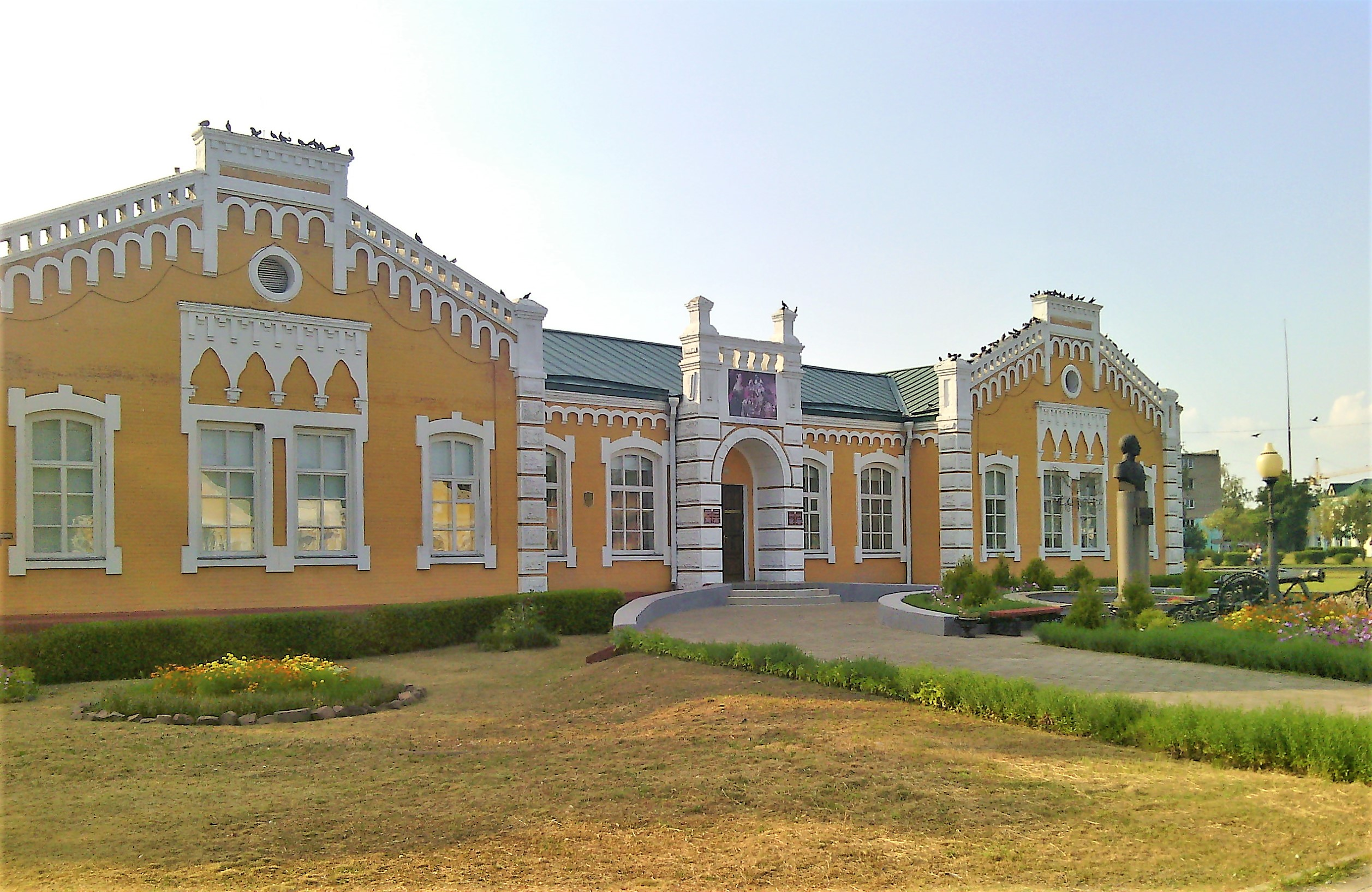
Museum
