= Dubki, Pechorsky District, Pskov Oblast =

Populated place in Pskov Oblast, Russia

Coordinates: 58°0′N 27°39′E

Dubki (Russian: Дубки; Seto: Tupka) is a locality in Pechorsky District of Pskov Oblast, Russia. It is situated on a peninsula on the shore of Lake Peipsi-Pihkva. Before 1920 it was a part of Pskov Governorate. From 1920 to 1944, it was a part of Petseri County of Estonia under Treaty of Tartu, but after the Second World War ended in 1945, it was taken during the RSFSR's annexation of Estonia.

Presently, Dubki is a pene-exclave. There is no direct land connection with Russia, which, during the Soviet times and previous Estonian rule, was not a problem. The unratified 2005 Estonian-Russian border treaty did not change the situation. As of 2010 there were no people living in Dubki.

== See also ==
- Sankovo-Medvezhye

== Sources ==
- Pictures of the area (Internet Archive)
- "Theory of enclaves" (PDF). Archived from the original on 2008-04-11. (4.2 MB) (Internet Archive)
- Hidden Europe. July 2005, #3. "Tangled Territories" (PDF). (631 KB)
- Численность постоянного населения муниципальных образований Псковской области по окончательным итогам Всероссийской переписи населения 2010 года. Verified on 25 November 2014. Seen on 25 November 2014.
