= Lake Chervonoye =

Lake in Belarus

- Чырвонае возера (Belarusian)
- Location within Belarus
- Coordinates: 52.4°N 27.95°E
- Lake type: Freshwater
- Primary outflows: Zhitkovichskij, Oziornij
- Catchment area: 353 km^{2} (136 sq mi)
- Basin countries: Belarus
- Surface area: 40.8 km^{2} (15.8 sq mi)
- Average depth: 0.7 m (2.3 ft)
- Max. depth: 2.9 m (9.5 ft)
- Water volume: 0.04 km^{3} (0.0096 cu mi)
- Shore length^{1}: 30.8 km (19.1 mi)
- Frozen: December–April
- ^{1} Shore length is not a well-defined measure.

Lake Chervonoye (Belarusian: Чырвонае возера, pronounced [tʂɨrˈvonaje ˈvozʲera]; Russian: Червоное озеро) is a large freshwater lake in Zhytkavichy District, Gomel Oblast, Belarus. Located at 52.4°N 27.95°E, it has an area of 40.8 km^{2} (15.8 mi^{2}) and a maximum depth of 2.9 m (9.5 ft).

The lake is used for fishery and is the third largest lake in Belarus.
