= Igor Brylo =

Belarusian politician

- Ігар Брыла

15th Minister of Agriculture of Belarus
- In office 10 February 2022 – 28 July 2023
- President: Alexander Lukashenko
- Prime Minister: Roman Golovchenko
- Preceded by: Ivan Krupko
- Succeeded by: Sergei Bartosh

Personal details
- Born: June 18, 1972 (age 53)

Igor Brylo (born June 18, 1972, in Borisov, Minsk Oblast) is a Belarusian government minister and was appointed the 15th Minister of Agriculture of Belarus from 2022 until his dismissal in 2023.

== Biography ==
Brylo was born on the 18th of June, 1972 in Borisov, in the Minsk Oblast.
in 1996, he finished the Vitebsk Government Institute of Veterinary Medicine with a degree in veterinary medicine.

On Nov. 27, 2023, he was removed from his post after the "commission of a misdemeanour incompatible with being in the civil service".
