= Karma district =

District of Gomel region, Belarus

Coordinates: 53°07′45″N 30°48′38″E

Karma district Кармянскі раён (Belarusian) Кормянский район (Russian)
- District
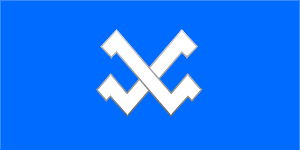
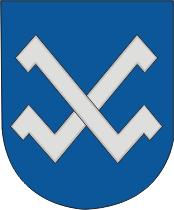
- Flag Coat of arms

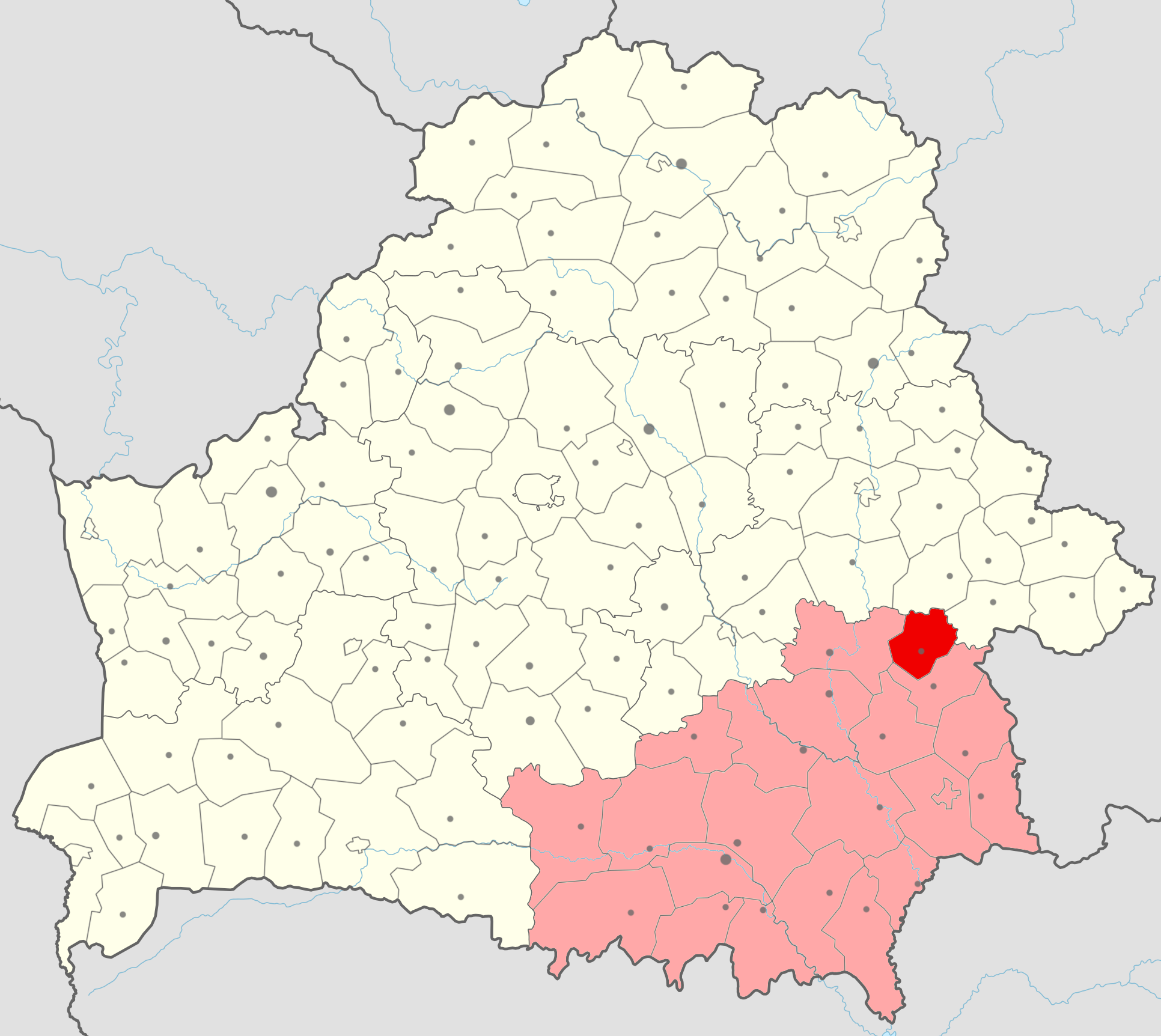
- Country: Belarus
- Region: Gomel region
- Administrative center: Karma

Area
  - Total: 949.15 km^{2} (366.47 sq mi)

Population (2024)
  - Total: 13,073
  - Density: 13.773/km^{2} (35.673/sq mi)
- Time zone: UTC+3 (MSK)

Karma district (Belarusian: Кармянскі раён, romanized: Karmianski rajon; Russian: Кормянский район) is a district (raion) of Gomel region in Belarus. Its administrative center is Karma. As of 2024, it has a population of 13,073.

== History ==
The district was severely affected by the Chernobyl disaster in 1986. Before 1986, there were 104 settlements in the district, and the population was 25.9 thousand people (including 6,450 people living in Karma). After the accident, 3,400 families (more than 6,000 people) were resettled; 29 settlements were resettled and subsequently abolished; two agricultural enterprises ceased to exist, and 16,800 hectares of agricultural land were withdrawn from use.
