= Dobrush district =

District of Gomel region, Belarus

Dobrush district Добрушскі раён (Belarusian) Добрушский район (Russian)
- District
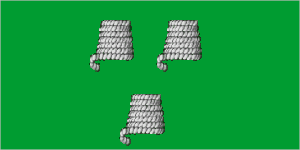
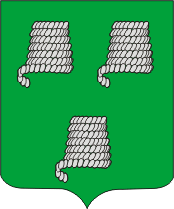
- Flag Coat of arms

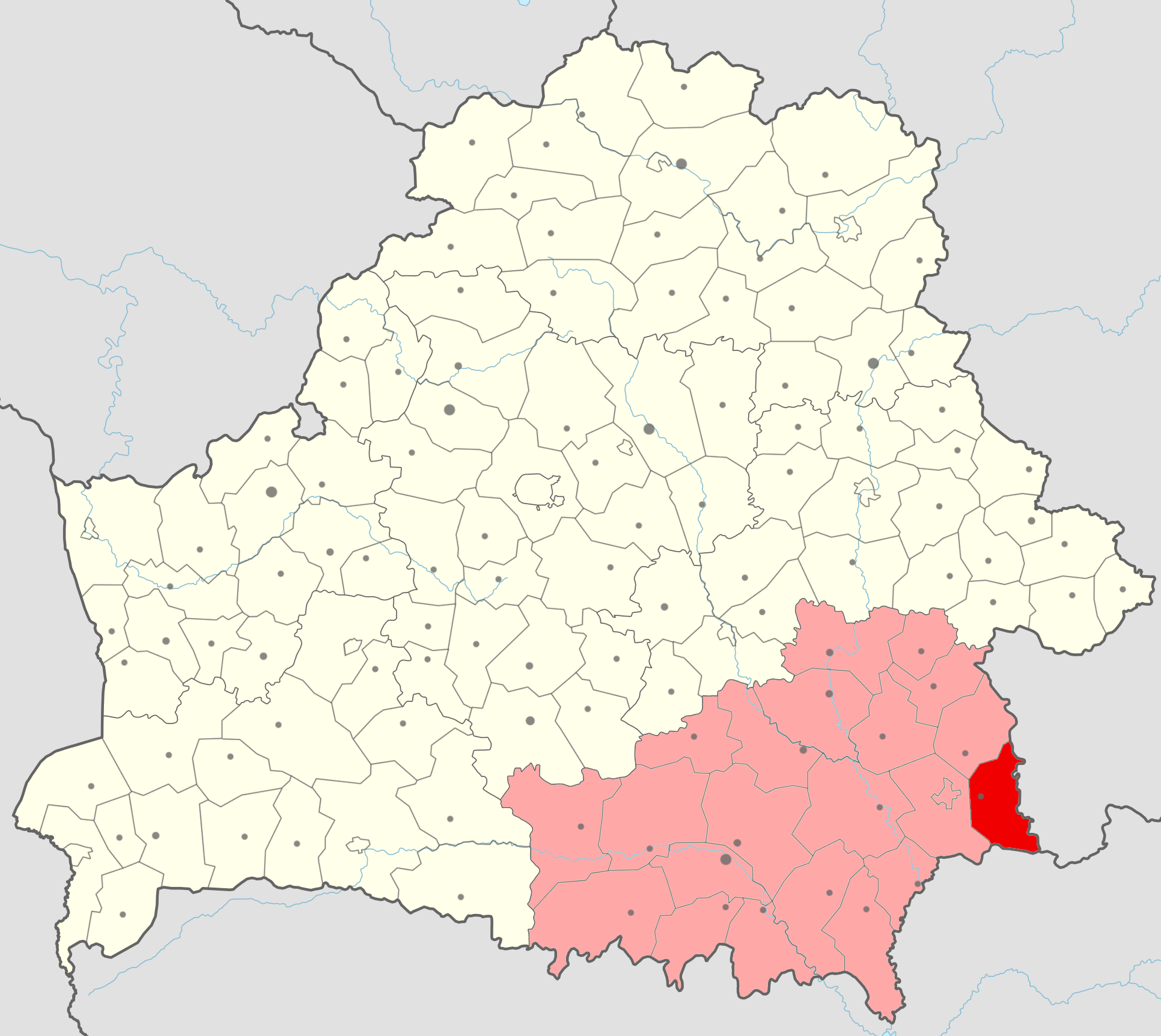
- Coordinates: 52°25′N 31°19′E
- Country: Belarus
- Region: Gomel region
- Administrative center: Dobrush

Area
  - Total: 1,452.72 km^{2} (560.90 sq mi)

Population (2024)
  - Total: 34,735
  - Density: 23.910/km^{2} (61.927/sq mi)
- Time zone: UTC+3 (MSK)
- Postal code: 247050
- Area code: +375 2333
- License plate: 3

Dobrush district or Dobruš district (Belarusian: Добрушскі раён, romanized: Dobrušski rajon; Russian: Добрушский район) is a district (raion) of Gomel region in Belarus. Its administrative center is Dobrush. As of 2024, it has a population of 34,735.

The uninhabited Russian exclave Sankovo-Medvezhye is situated in the district.

== Administrative divisions ==
Dobrush district is divided into 14 village council regions (selsoviets).

- Borschovsky
- Ivakovsky
- Kormyansky
- Krugovets-Kalininsky
- Krupetsky
- Kuzminichsky
- Leninist
- Nosovichsky
- Pererostovsky
- Rassvetovsky
- Terekhovsky
- Usoho-Budsky
- Utevsky
- Zhgunsky

== Notable residents ==
- Cimoch Vostrykaǔ (in Belarusian Цімох Вострыкаў) (1922, Barščoŭka village - 2007), member of the anti-Soviet resistance, representative of the Rada of the Belarusian Democratic Republic, a Gulag prisoner
