= St. Volodymyr Chapel =

Coordinates: 65°14′44.5″S 64°15′27″W

St Volodymyr Chapel
- Grand Prince St. Volodymyr, Equal-to-the-Apostles
- Каплиця Святого Володимира
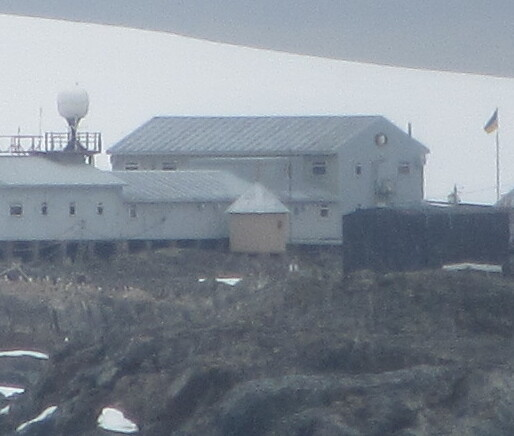
- St Volodymyr Chapel
- Location: Vernadsky Research Base, Galindez Island
- Denomination: Eastern Orthodox

History
- Status: Active
- Dedication: St. Volodymyr the Great

Architecture
- Years built: 2010–2011

Specifications
- Materials: Wood

St Volodymyr Chapel (properly Grand Prince St. Volodymyr, Equal-to-the-Apostles) is a small Ukrainian Orthodox Chapel which serves the Vernadsky Research Base on Galindez Island, Antarctica. It is one of eight churches in Antarctica. It is dedicated to St. Volodymyr the Great.

The chapel, a simple wooden construction, was built on the island in 2011. Its creation was funded by philanthropists. It was consecrated by the then Metropolitan of Lviv and Galicia, Augustine. Despite its small size, the chapel is richly decorated. Its contents include an icon of St. Nicholas.
