= Chachersk =

Chachersk Чачэрск (Belarusian)
- Town
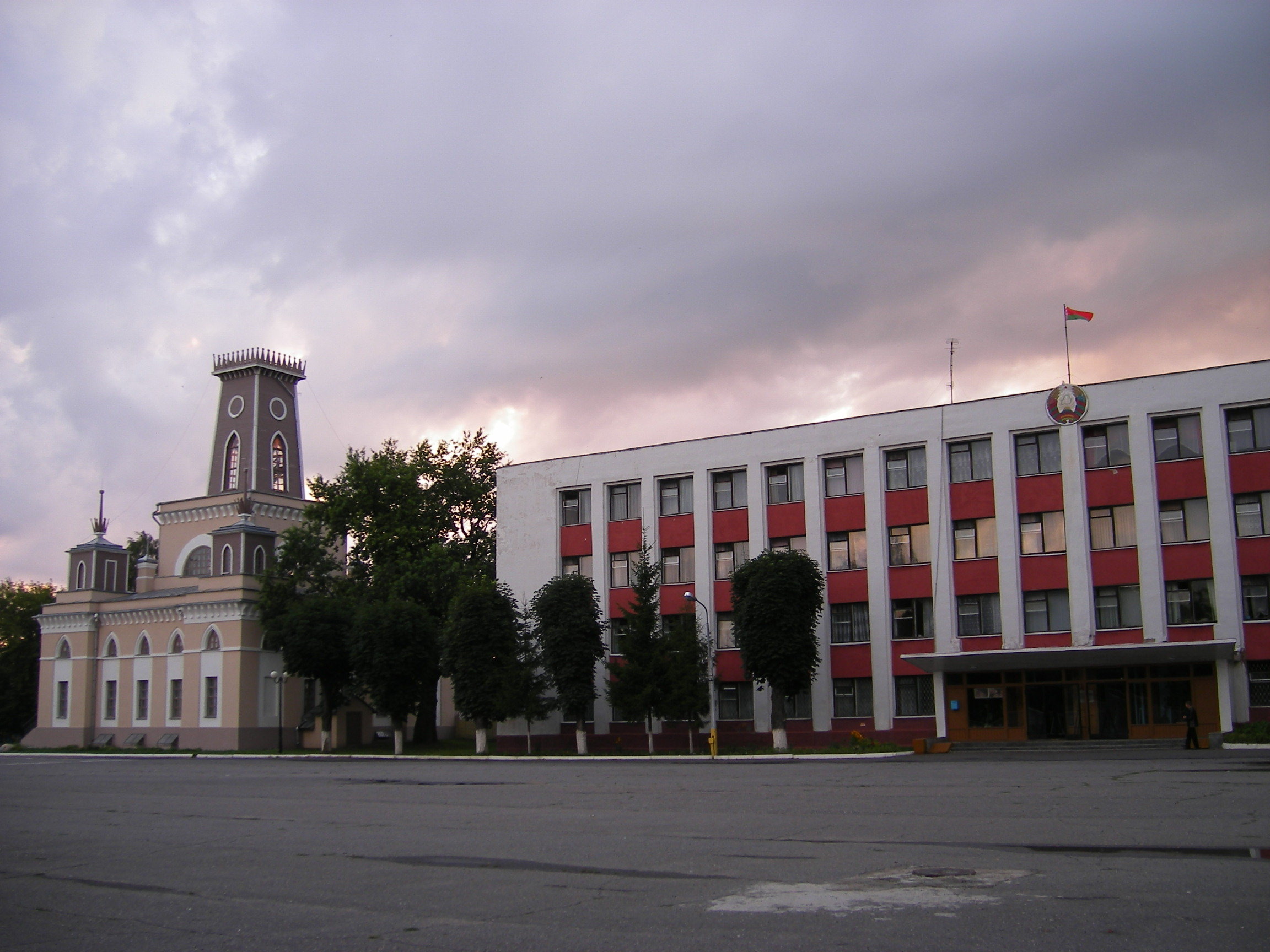

- Flag Coat of arms

- Location within Belarus
- Coordinates: 52°54′58″N 30°54′58″E
- Country: Belarus
- Region: Gomel Region
- District: Chachersk District
- Founded: 1159

Government
  - Chairman: Igor Aslyuk

Area
  - Total: 8.2 km^{2} (3.2 sq mi)
- Elevation: 146 m (479 ft)

Population (2025)
  - Total: 8,926
  - Density: 1,100/km^{2} (2,800/sq mi)
- Time zone: UTC+3 (MSK)
- Postal code: 27152
- Area code: (+375) 2332
- Website: Official website

Chachersk or Chechersk (Note: Belarusian: Чачэрск, romanized: Čačersk, IPA: [tʂaˈtʂɛrsk]; Russian: Чечерск, romanized: Chechersk; Polish: Czeczersk.) is a town in Gomel Region, in eastern Belarus. It serves as the administrative center of Chachersk District. As of 2025, it has a population of 8,926.

It is located in an area which was highly contaminated due to the fallout of the Chernobyl disaster.

== History ==
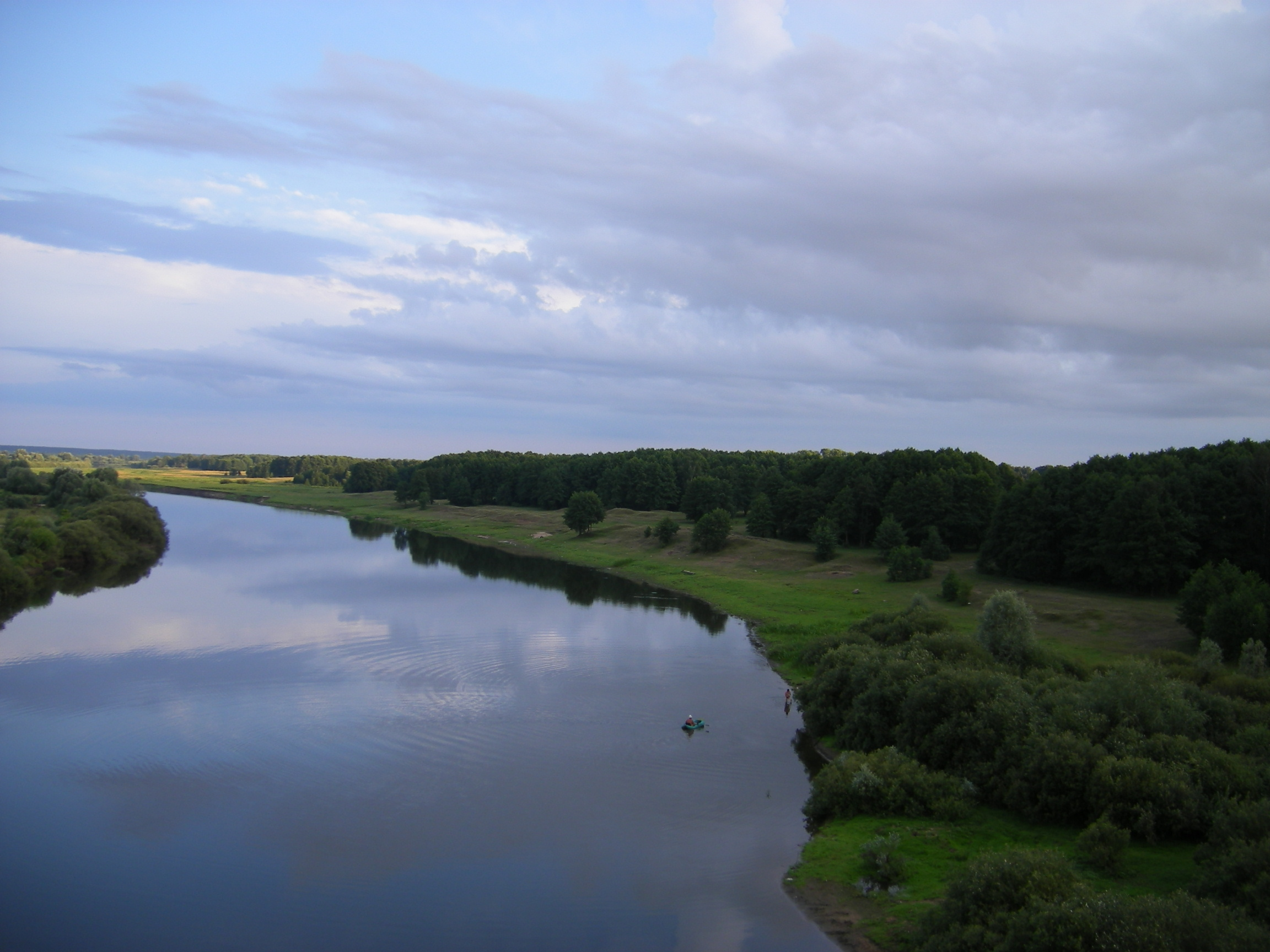
The Sozh River near Chachersk

The town was founded in the late 10th century on the Sozh River. It was first mentioned in chronicles in 1159 as the city Radimichi Chachersk. Sometime later a castle was built in the area.

From 14th century to 1772, Chachersk was part of the Grand Duchy of Lithuania, which was part of the Polish–Lithuanian Commonwealth from 1569. It was granted town rights in 1511.

In 1772, it became part of the Russian Empire, as the center of the county in the province Rahachow, then borough, and parish center of Rogachev district. In 1774, Catherine II of Russia in collaboration with a local governor helped build the town hall, churches, a theater, 2 hospitals, and other notable buildings. Redevelopment of the city took place, with the destruction of the castle and the fortifications, which were mentioned more in the "Census" Chachersk for 1765. There are two surviving unique sights of the 18th century - the Holy Transfiguration Church and Town Hall in Chachersk. The Holy Transfiguration Church was built in classicism style 1783 and has international architectural worth.

From 1919 to 1926, Chachersk was part of Gomel Governorate in the Russian SFSR. Then, in December 1926, it was given to Byelorussian SSR.

During Operation Barbarossa in 1941, Nazi Germany captured the town and established a ghetto for Chachersk's Jewish population. The Jews of Chachersk, as well as neighboring Romani, were eventually exterminated in December 1941. A Nazi prison was also operated in the town.

Chachersk officially became a town in 1971.

== Economy ==
Since 1629 the town has had the privilege of a weekly trade and a 2-week fair in the year.

Now the economy of the city is based on the enterprises of the food industry and is a center for arts and crafts (embroidery, weaving, etc.).
