= Zhytkavichy =

Zhytkavichy Жыткавічы (Belarusian) Житковичи (Russian)
- Town
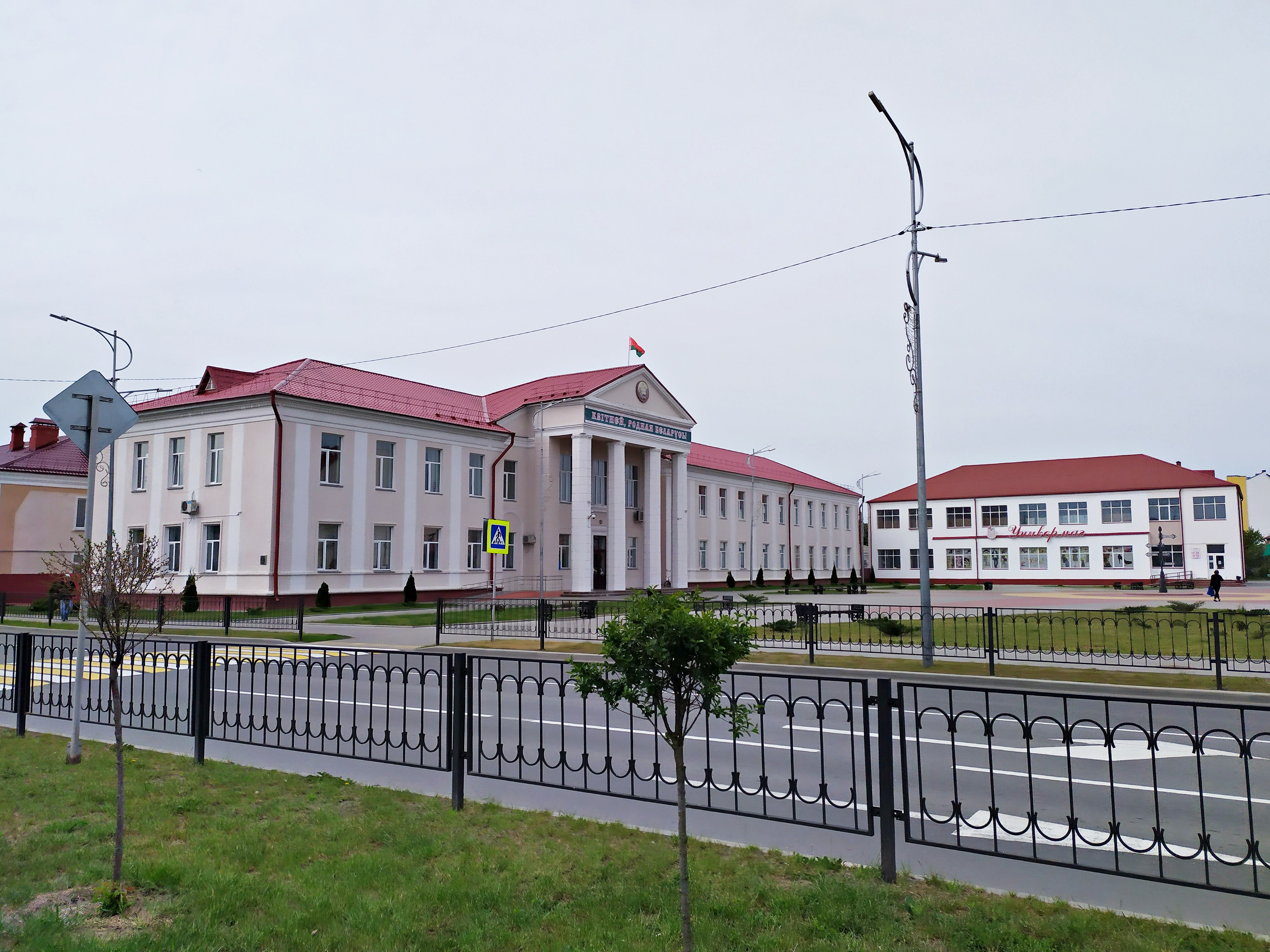
- Town center

- Flag Coat of arms

- Location within Belarus
- Coordinates: 52°14′N 27°52′E
- Country: Belarus
- Region: Gomel Region
- District: Zhytkavichy District

Population (2025)
  - Total: 15,788
- Time zone: UTC+3 (MSK)
- Postal code: 247951 (2,3)
- Area code: +375 2353
- License plate: 3

Zhytkavichy or Zhitkovichi (Note: (Belarusian: Жыткавічы, romanized: Žytkavičy; Russian: Житковичи, romanized: Zhitkovichi; Polish: Żydkowicze.) is a town in Gomel Region, in southern Belarus. It serves as the administrative center of Zhytkavichy District. As of 2025, it has a population of 15,788.

== History ==
Zhytkavichy was first mentioned in 1500.

== Climate ==
Climate data for Zhytkavichy (1991–2020)
Month	Jan	Feb	Mar	Apr	May	Jun	Jul	Aug	Sep	Oct	Nov	Dec	Year
Record high °C (°F)	6.0 (42.8)	8.4 (47.1)	15.3 (59.5)	24.0 (75.2)	28.7 (83.7)	31.5 (88.7)	32.4 (90.3)	38.9 (102.0)	27.1 (80.8)	21.7 (71.1)	13.7 (56.7)	7.6 (45.7)	38.9 (102.0)
Mean daily maximum °C (°F)	−0.8 (30.6)	0.9 (33.6)	6.4 (43.5)	14.7 (58.5)	20.6 (69.1)	24.0 (75.2)	25.7 (78.3)	25.0 (77.0)	19.1 (66.4)	12.3 (54.1)	5.1 (41.2)	0.5 (32.9)	12.8 (55.0)
Daily mean °C (°F)	−3.5 (25.7)	−2.6 (27.3)	1.8 (35.2)	8.7 (47.7)	14.3 (57.7)	17.9 (64.2)	19.6 (67.3)	18.6 (65.5)	13.2 (55.8)	7.5 (45.5)	2.2 (36.0)	−2.0 (28.4)	8.0 (46.4)
Mean daily minimum °C (°F)	−6.0 (21.2)	−5.6 (21.9)	−2.2 (28.0)	3.2 (37.8)	8.3 (46.9)	12.0 (53.6)	14.0 (57.2)	12.7 (54.9)	8.1 (46.6)	3.5 (38.3)	−0.2 (31.6)	−4.2 (24.4)	3.6 (38.5)
Record low °C (°F)	−19.8 (−3.6)	−17.9 (−0.2)	−11.9 (10.6)	−4.5 (23.9)	0.6 (33.1)	4.8 (40.6)	8.5 (47.3)	5.9 (42.6)	0.0 (32.0)	−5.3 (22.5)	−9.9 (14.2)	−14.9 (5.2)	−19.8 (−3.6)
Average precipitation mm (inches)	47.0 (1.85)	43.5 (1.71)	48.6 (1.91)	43.1 (1.70)	70.0 (2.76)	78.4 (3.09)	118.9 (4.68)	68.1 (2.68)	55.2 (2.17)	57.8 (2.28)	49.6 (1.95)	52.5 (2.07)	732.7 (28.85)
Average precipitation days (≥ 1.0 mm)	11.1	10.2	10.2	8.0	9.7	10.7	11.0	8.0	7.7	8.5	9.4	11.2	115.7
Source 1: NOAA
Source 2: Omiget (August record high)
