= Yemilchyne =

Rural locality in Zhytomyr Oblast, Ukraine

Yemilchyne Ємільчине
- Rural settlement
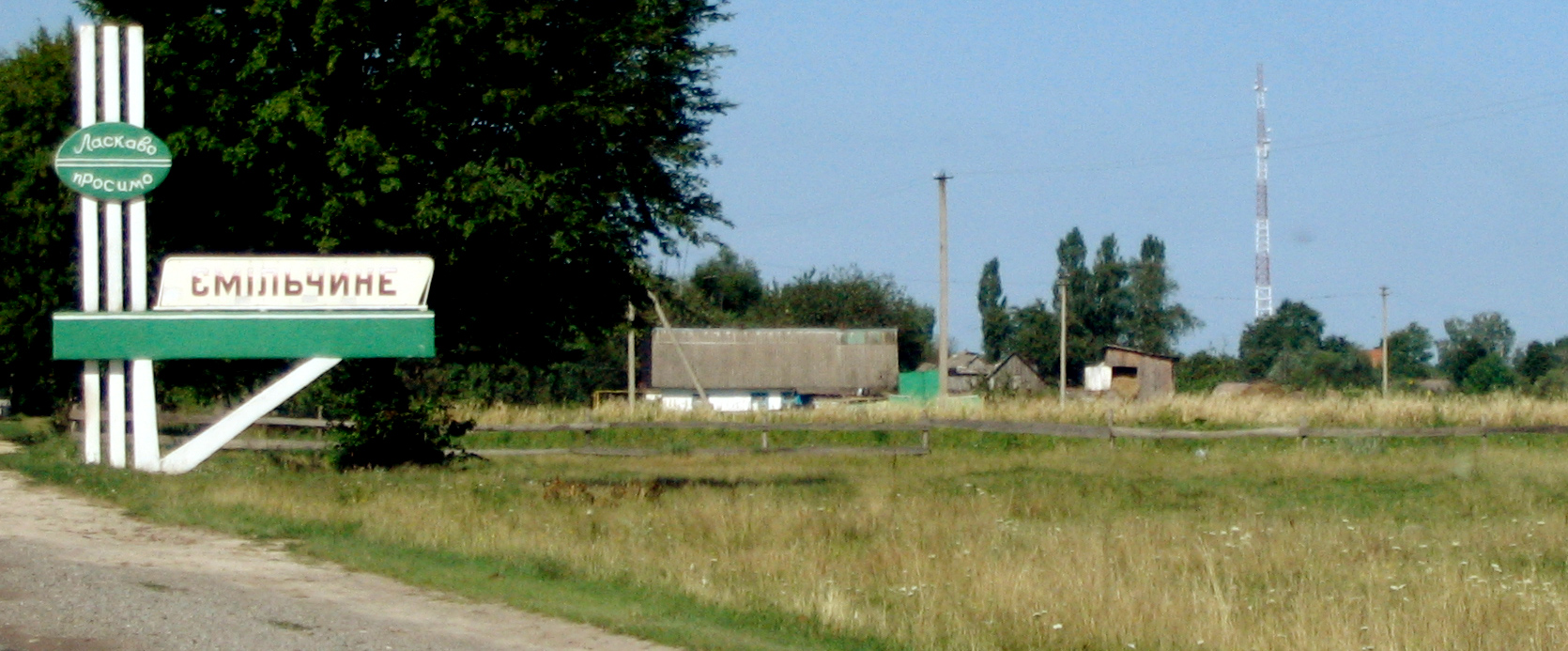
- Yemilchyne welcome sign

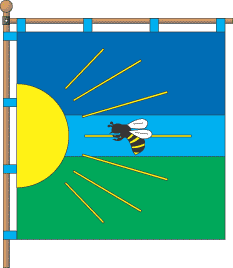
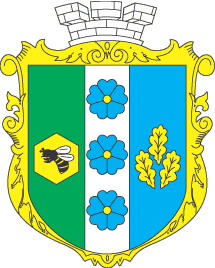
- Flag Coat of arms

- Location in Zhytomyr Oblast Location in Ukraine
- Coordinates: 50°52′20″N 27°48′28″E
- Country: Ukraine
- Oblast: Zhytomyr
- Raion: Zviahel Raion
- First mention: 1585
- Urban-type settlement status: 1957

Government
  - Mayor: Serhiy Voloshchuk

Area
  - Total: 8 km^{2} (3.1 sq mi)
- Elevation: 206 m (676 ft)

Population (2022)
  - Total: 6,162 ▼
  - Density: 770/km^{2} (2,000/sq mi)
- Postal code: 11200-11201
- Area code: +380 4149

Yemilchyne (Ukrainian: Ємі́льчине, translit. Yemil’chyne, Russian: Емильчи́но) is a rural settlement in Zviahel Raion, Zhytomyr Oblast, Ukraine. Population: 6,162 (2022 estimate)

== Geography ==
Yemilchyne is located on the upper flow of Ubort river in the historical area of Volhynian Polesia.

== History ==
The town was part of the Polish Kingdom from 1585 to 1793, then became part of the Russian Empire.

During the Russian Civil War, it suffered attacks and pogroms, including a violent pogrom by retreating troops in April 1919.

A Jewish school taught in Yiddish from the 1920s until 1937, while the synagogue was later destroyed during World War II. The Jewish population was 1,338 people, or 38.3%, in 1926 and 1,115 people, or 21%, in 1939.

It was formerly a district centre of Zhytomyr Oblast.

In 1941, the Nazis occupied Emilchino. They shot 38 local Jews in July and murdered the remaining Jews in September. A mass grave is located on Vorovskij Street.

In November and December 1943, a partisan detachment liberated the settlement and held it for 22 days.

Yemilchyne has local industry, schools, cultural institutions, healthcare facilities, and museums. Its landmarks include memorials to Taras Shevchenko, World War II, and Afghan war veterans. An asteroid is named after the settlement.

Until 26 January 2024, Yemilchyne was designated urban-type settlement. On this day, a new law entered into force which abolished this status, and Yemilchyne became a rural settlement.
