= Ivan Krupko =

Belarusian politician (born 1974)

- Иван Крупко
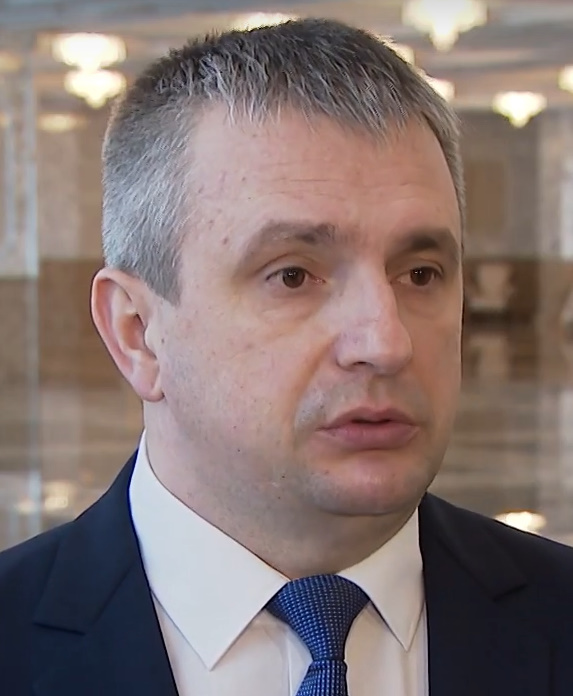
- Krupko in 2020

Governor of the Gomel Region
- Incumbent
- Assumed office 21 December 2021
- President: Alexander Lukashenko
- Preceded by: Gennady Solovey

Minister of Agriculture
- In office 16 March 2020 – 21 December 2021
- President: Alexander Lukashenko
- Prime Minister: Syarhey Rumas; Roman Golovchenko
- Preceded by: Anatoly Khotko
- Succeeded by: Igor Brylo

Personal details
- Born: 23 July 1974 (age 51)

Ivan Ivanovich Krupko (Russian: Иван Иванович Крупко; born 23 July 1974) is a Belarusian politician serving as governor of the Gomel Region since 2021. From March 2018 to his appointment as Minister of Agriculture, he was Chairman of the Minsk District Executive Committee. Then, from 2020 to 2021, he served as Minister of Agriculture. Upon appointment Krupko minister, Alexander Lukashenko explained his reasoning as needing a more experienced manager, which he expected from Krupko as he had led the Minsk district formerly.

Due to his support of Russia during the Russian invasion of Ukraine, since 2022 Krupko has been under multiple international sanctions by the European Union and other countries for "threatening the territorial integrity" of Ukraine.

== Early life ==
Krupko was born on 23 July 1974 in Burdevichi, a village in the Grodno Region, when was then part of the Byelorussian SSR. From 1993 to 1995 he served in the Armed Forces of Belarus, and in 1998 he graduated from Grodno State Agrarian University after an interrupted study. After graduated he worked as chief livestock technician of the collective farm "Rassvet" in the Nesvizh district until 2002, and then until 2006 he then headed the Head of the Department of Production and Processing of Products of the Department of Agriculture and Food of the Nesvizh District. In 2007 he graduated the Academy of Public Administration.

== International sanctions ==
Since 25 February 2022, he has been under sanctions by the European Union for his role in support of Russia during the Russian invasion of Ukraine. On 15 March 2022, he was officially sanctioned by the United Kingdom, also for his role in "threatening the territorial integrity" of Ukraine. Later that year he was added to the sanctions lists of Ukraine itself and of Canada.

== Honours ==
- Medal for Labour Merit (December 2016)
- Order of Friendship of Peoples (Bryansk Oblast, Russia; January 2024)
