= Yelsk district =

District of Gomel region, Belarus

Coordinates: 51°49′N 29°09′E

Yelsk district Ельскі раён (Belarusian) Ельский район (Russian)
- District
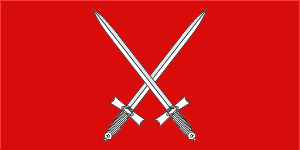
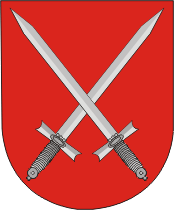
- Flag Coat of arms

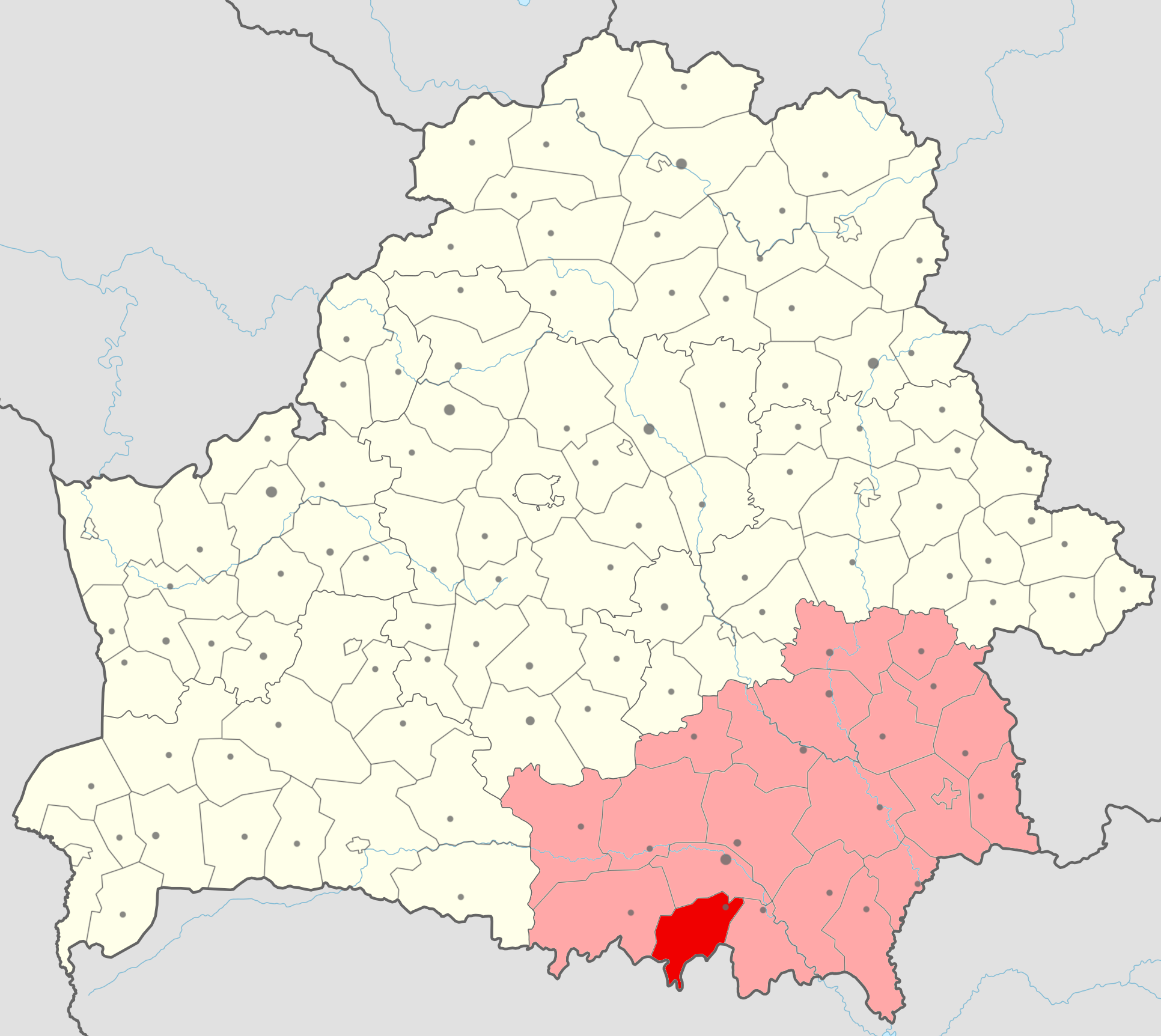
- Country: Belarus
- Region: Gomel region
- Administrative center: Yelsk

Area
  - Total: 1,365.68 km^{2} (527.29 sq mi)

Population (2024)
  - Total: 13,951
  - Density: 10.215/km^{2} (26.458/sq mi)
- Time zone: UTC+3 (MSK)

Yelsk district or Jeĺsk district (Note: Official transliteration) (Belarusian: Ельскі раён, romanized: Jeĺski Rajon; Russian: Ельский район) is a district (raion) of Gomel region in Belarus. Its administrative center is Yelsk. As of 2024, it has a population of 13,951.
