= Ubort =

River in Ukraine and Belarus

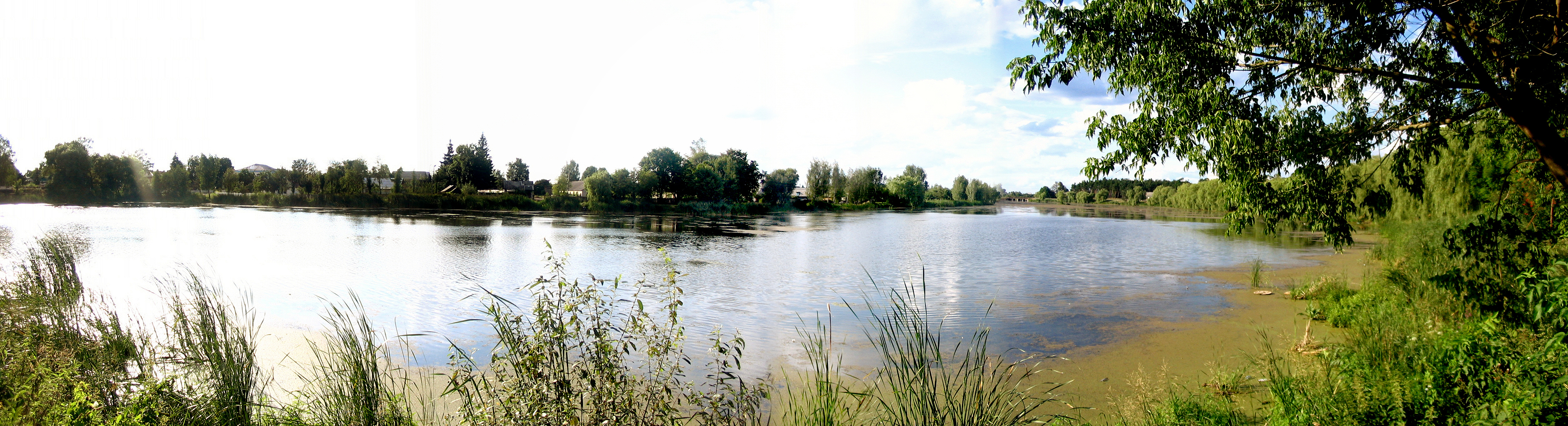
- The Ubort River at Yemilchyne, Ukraine

- Location within Belarus

Location
- Country: Ukraine, Belarus

Physical characteristics
- Source
  - coordinates: 50°42′36″N 27°53′56″E
- Mouth: Pripyat
  - coordinates: 52°06′05″N 28°27′56″E
- Length: 292 km (181 mi)
- Basin size: 5,820 km^{2} (2,250 sq mi)

Basin features
- Progression: Pripyat→ Dnieper→ Dnieper–Bug estuary→ Black Sea

The Ubort (Ukrainian: Уборть; Belarusian: Убарць, Ubarć) is a river in Zhytomyr Oblast (Ukraine) and Gomel Region (Belarus), a right tributary to the Pripyat in the Dnieper river basin. It is 292 kilometres (181 mi) long, and has a drainage basin of 5,820 square kilometres (2,250 sq mi).

The Ubort is fed mostly by melting snow (~70%) and peaks during the spring run-off, usually mid-March to early May, and maintains an even, albeit lower, flow during the summer months. It can freeze as early as mid-November or as late as January, and the ice breaks up as early as mid-February or as late as mid-April.

== Course ==
The Ubort originates in the hills above and south of the village of Andreyevichi in Zhytomyr Oblast. It arises at elevation 207 m., from a series of small creeks flowing westward off of the Simony Hills, elevation 222 m, and northeastward off of the Marynivka Hills, elevation 225 m. The river flows north past Yemilchyne and Olevsk, thence across the international border into Belarus near Borovoye (Баравое). It then flows northeast and north past Lelchytsy, and Moiseyevichi, before entering the Pripyat at Pyetrykaw. The mouth of the river is at an elevation of 120 meters.

The principle tributaries of the Ubort are the 67 km Perga (Перга) with its mouth at 51°24′00″N 027°52′57″E in Ukraine, and the 58 km Svidovets (Свидовець) with its mouth at 51°42′55″N 028°17′28″E in Belarus.

The river has a low incline dropping only 87 meters over its 292 kilometer length. The result is a meandering river with many swamps and oxbox lakes. The area of its drainage basin is 5,820 square kilometres (2,247 sq mi). The average annual flow of water at the mouth of the Ubort is 24.4 Cubic metres per second.

== History ==
The name appears in Latin as Hubort in a 1412 survey document. Some maps in the seventeenth and eighteenth centuries mark it as the Олевская (Olevskaya) or in Polish Olewsko, as being of the town of Olevsk. The origin of the name Ubort is obscure, but seems to be related to the use of boards (ubort) in making artificial hollow trees for honey bees.

In July 1941, between 30 and 40 Jews from Olevsk were taken to the Ubort River, where they were humiliated and tortured; some of them were murdered in the pogrom.

It was contaminated during the Chernobyl disaster.

== Books ==
- Khvagina, T. A. (2005). Polesye: from the Bug to the Ubort' (in Belarusian, Russian, and English). Minsk: Vysheysha shkola. ISBN 985-06-1153-7.
- Gerlach, Thomas (2009). Ukraine: Zwischen den Karpaten und dem Schwarzen Meer (Ukraine: Between the Carpathians and the Black Sea) (in German). Berlin: Trescher. ISBN 978-3-89794-152-6.
