= Zhytkavichy district =

District of Gomel region, Belarus

Coordinates: 52°13′02″N 27°51′17″E

Zhytkavichy district Жыткавіцкі раён (Belarusian) Житковичский район (Russian)
- District
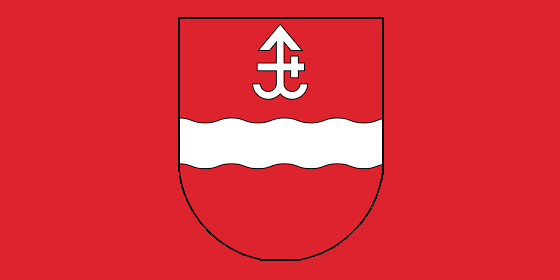
- Flag Coat of arms

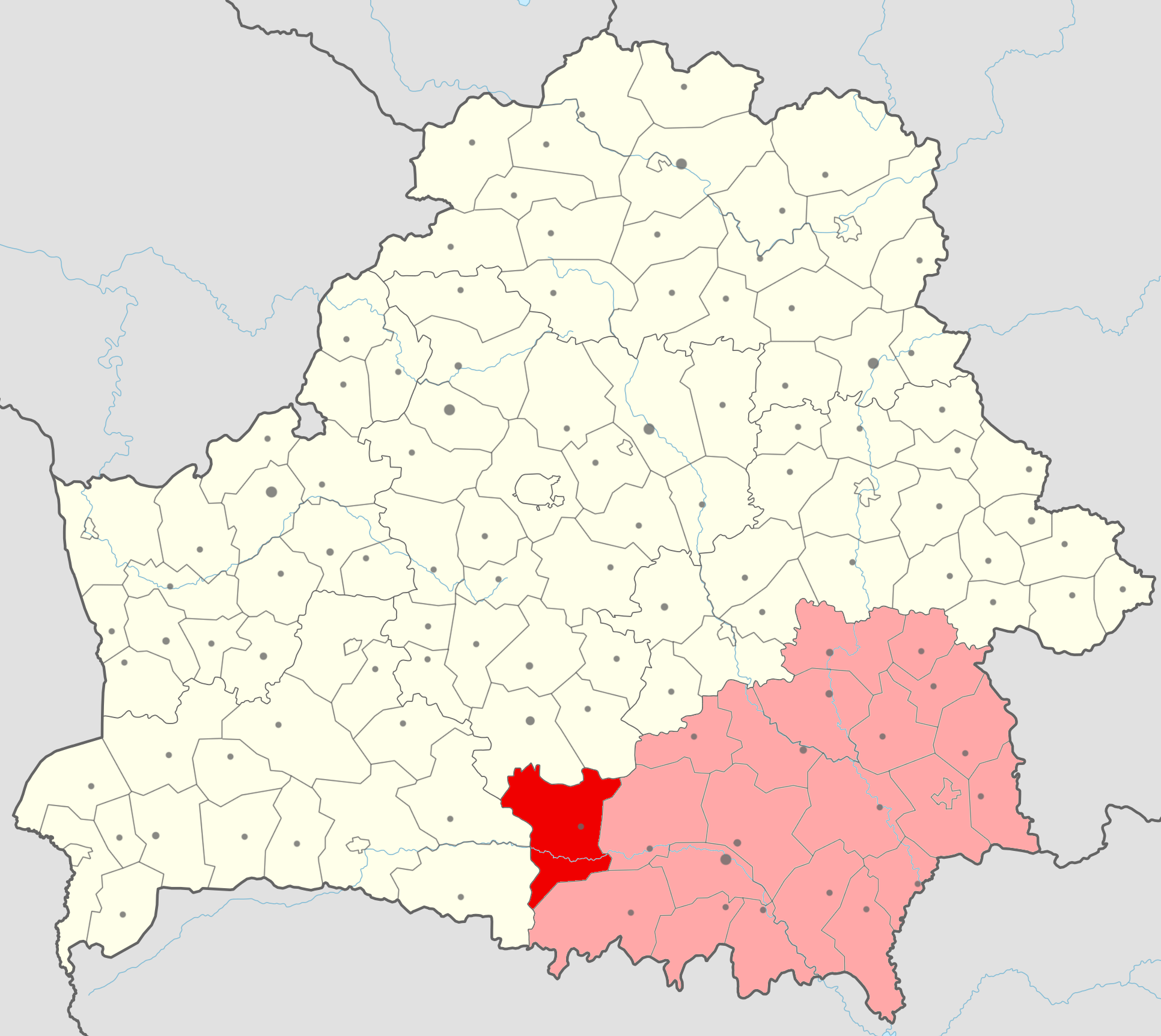
- Country: Belarus
- Region: Gomel region
- Administrative center: Zhytkavichy

Area
  - Total: 2,916.27 km^{2} (1,125.98 sq mi)

Population (2024)
  - Total: 32,740
  - Density: 11.23/km^{2} (29.08/sq mi)
- Time zone: UTC+3 (MSK)

Zhytkavichy district or Žytkavičy district (Belarusian: Жыткавіцкі раён; Russian: Житковичский район) is a district (raion) of Gomel region in Belarus. Its administrative center is Zhytkavichy. As of 2024, it has a population of 32,740.

The third largest lake in the country, Lake Chervonoye, is situated in the district.
