= Chachersk district =

District of Gomel region, Belarus

Coordinates: 52°55′N 30°55′E

Chachersk district Чачэрскі раён (Belarusian) Чечерский район (Russian)
- District
- Flag Coat of arms

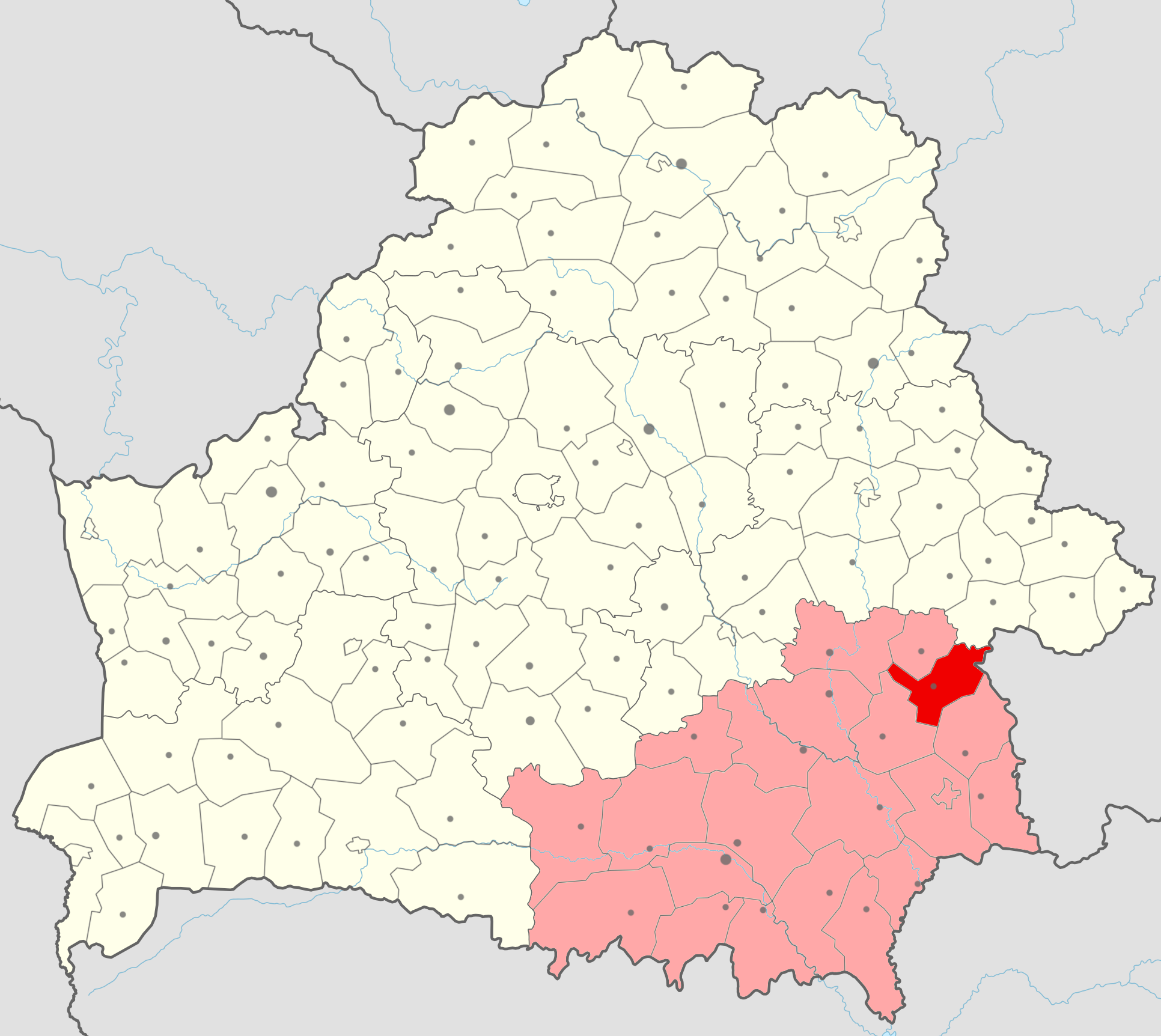
- Country: Belarus
- Region: Gomel region
- Administrative center: Chachersk

Area
  - Total: 1,229.88 km^{2} (474.86 sq mi)

Population (2024)
  - Total: 14,288
  - Density: 11.617/km^{2} (30.089/sq mi)
- Time zone: UTC+3 (MSK)

Chachersk district or Čačersk district (Belarusian: Чачэрскі раён, romanized: Čačerski rajon; Russian: Чечерский район) is a district (raion) of Gomel region in Belarus. Its administrative center is Chachersk. As of 2024, it has a population of 14,288.
