= Gomel region =

Region of Belarus

Coordinates: 52°20′N 29°40′E

Gomel region Гомельская вобласць (Belarusian) Гомельская область (Russian)
- Region
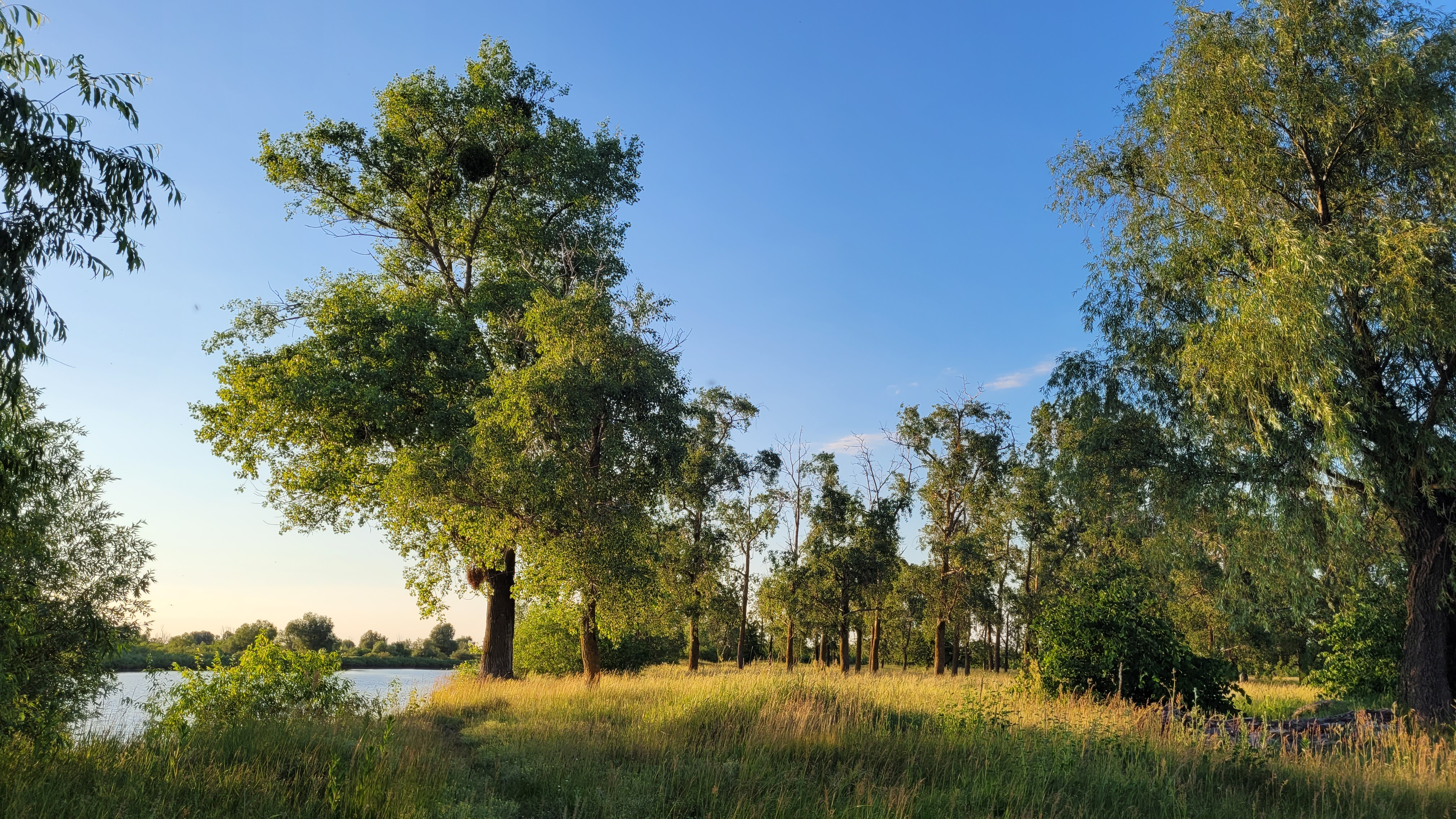
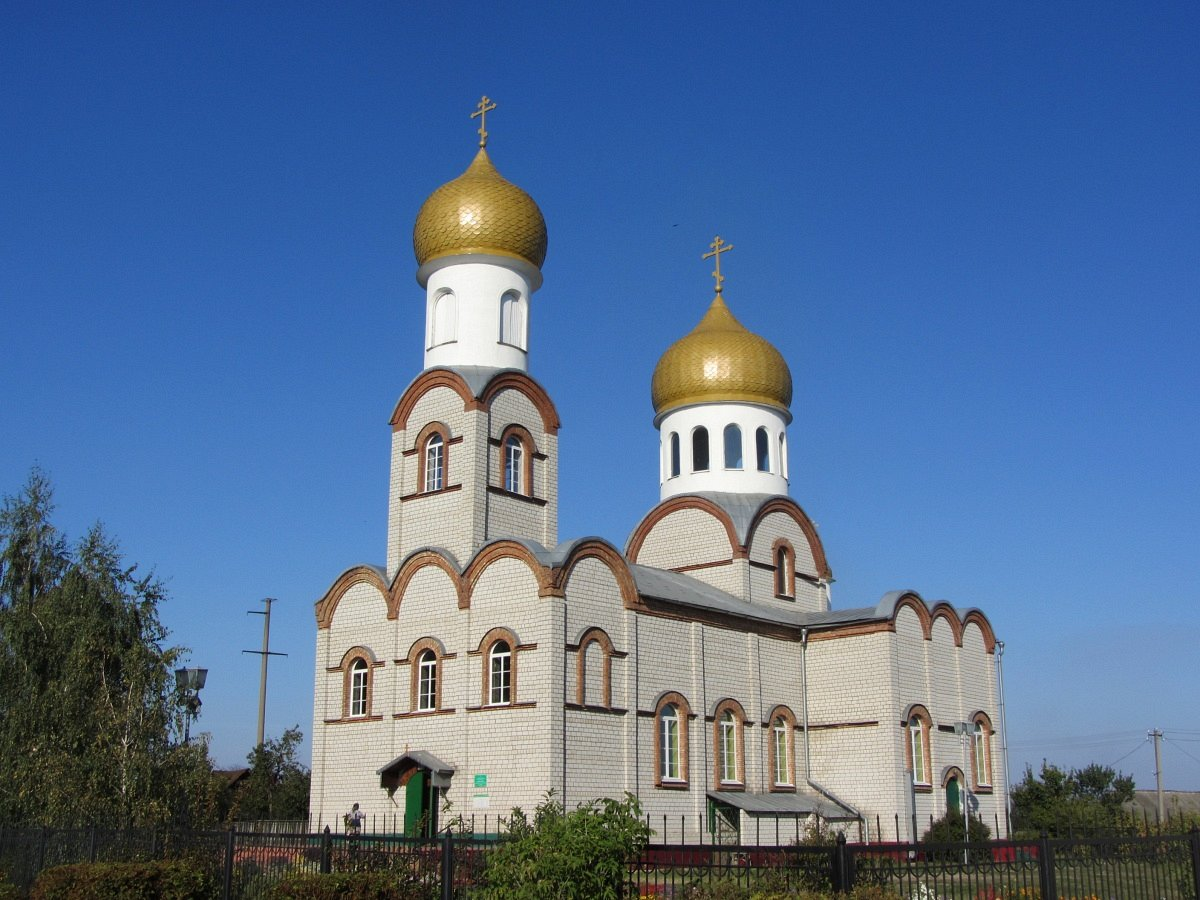
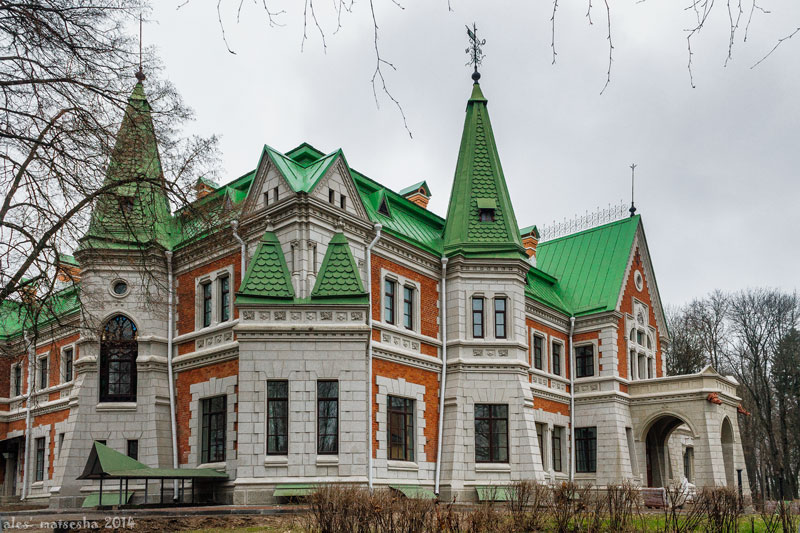
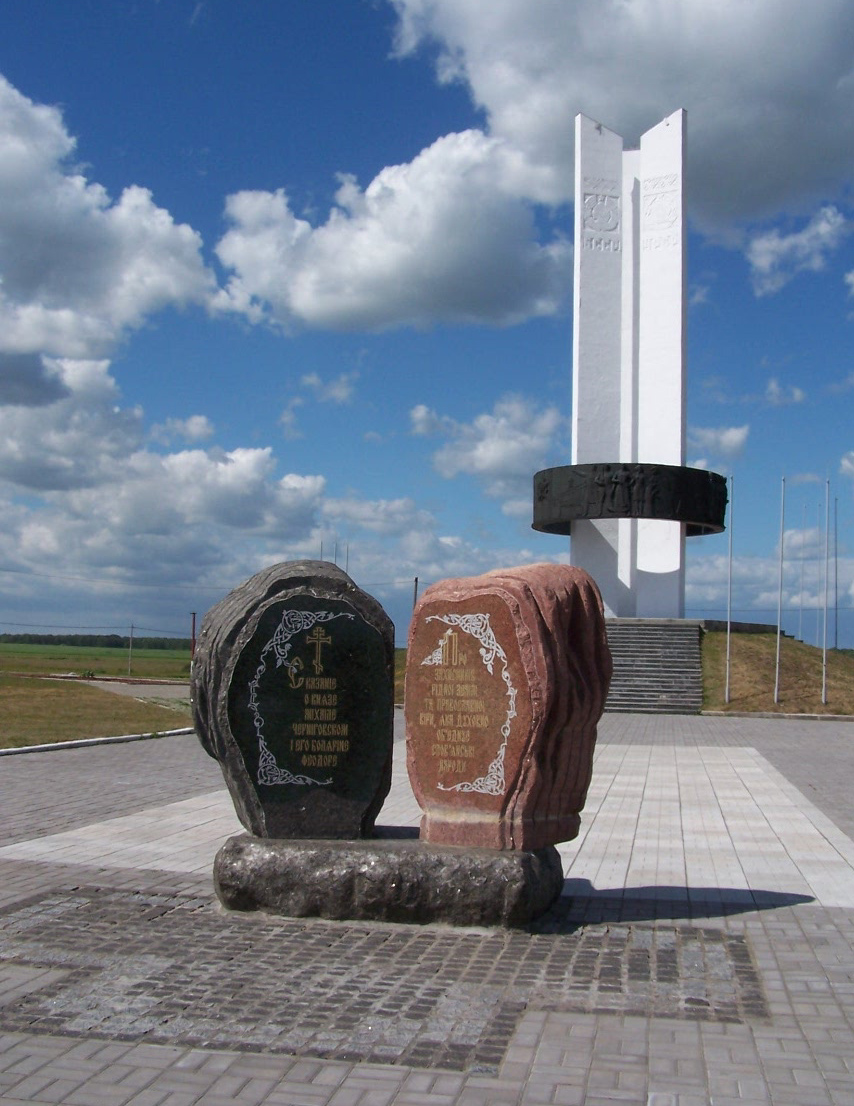
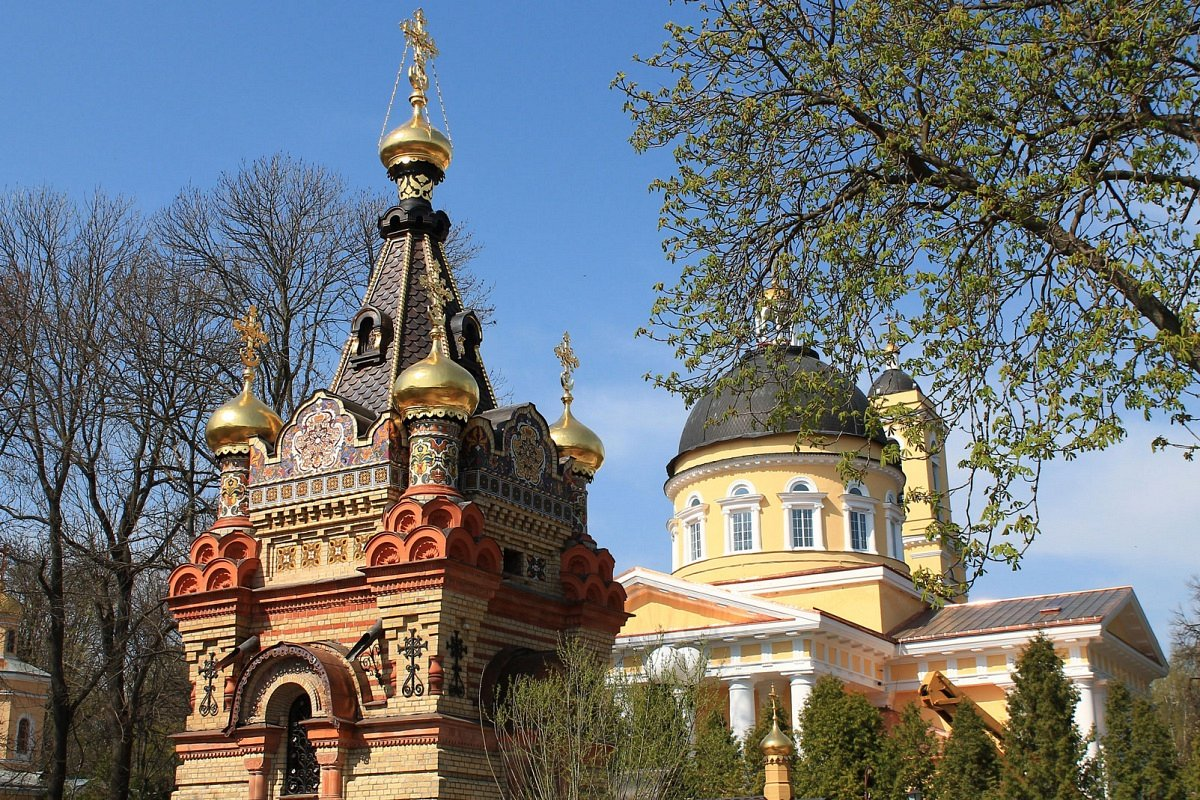
- From the top to bottom-right: Turovsky Meadow, Žlobin Holy Trinity Church, Kozieł-Pakleŭski Manor, Three Sisters Monument, Paskevich Burial Vault

- Flag Coat of arms

- Interactive map of Gomel region
- Country: Belarus
- Administrative center: Gomel
- Largest cities: Gomel – 481,200; Mazyr – 111,800; Zhlobin – 72,800
- Districts: 21; Cities – 17; Urban localities – 278; Villages – 2,608
- City districts: 4

Government
  - Chairman: Ivan Krupko

Area
  - Total: 40,361.66 km^{2} (15,583.72 sq mi)

Population (2024)
  - Total: 1,338,617
  - Density: 33.16556/km^{2} (85.89840/sq mi)

GDP (nominal,2024)
  - Total: Br 27.943 billion (US$8.559 billion)
  - Per capita: Br 20,958 (US$6,419)
- ISO 3166 code: BY-HO
- HDI (2022): 0.801 very high · 2th
- Website: www.gomel-region.by

Gomel region, also known as Gomel oblast (Note: Russian: Гомельская область, romanized: Gomelskaya oblast'.) or Homyel voblasts, (Note: Belarusian: Гомельская вобласць, romanized: Homieĺskaja voblasć.) is one of the regions of Belarus. Its administrative center is Gomel. The total area of the region is 40,400 square kilometres (15,600 sq mi). As of 2024, it had a population of 1,338,617.

Its largest settlements include Gomel, Mazyr, Zhlobin, Svyetlahorsk, Rechytsa, Kalinkavichy, Rahachow and Dobrush.

Both Gomel region and Mogilev region suffered severely from the Chernobyl disaster. Gomel Province borders the Chernobyl Exclusion Zone in places, and parts of it have been designated as mandatory or voluntary resettlement areas as a result of the radioactive contamination.

== Administrative territorial entities ==
Gomel region comprises 21 districts and 2 city municipalities. The districts have 278 selsovets and 17 cities and towns.

=== Districts of Gomel region ===
- Aktsyabrski district
- Brahin district
- Buda-Kashalyova district
- Chachersk district
- Dobrush district
- Gomel district
- Kalinkavichy district
- Karma district
- Khoiniki district
- Lyelchytsy district
- Loyew district
- Mazyr district
- Narowlya district
- Pyetrykaw district
- Rahachow district
- Rechytsa district
- Svyetlahorsk district
- Vyetka district
- Yelsk district
- Zhlobin district
- Zhytkavichy district

=== Cities and towns ===
English	Belarusian	Pop. (2023)
Gomel	Гомель	501,802
Mazyr	Мазыр	105,321
Zhlobin	Жлобін	77,049
Rechytsa	Рэчыца	65,423
Svyetlahorsk	Светлагорск	63,202
Kalinkavichy	Калінкавічы	37,050
Rahachow	Рагачоў	32,029
Dobrush	Добруш	18,137
Zhytkavichy	Жыткавічы	15,961
Khoyniki	Хойнікі	13,248
Pyetrykaw	Петрыкаў	10,303
Chachersk	Чачэрск	8,885
Yelsk	Ельск	8,864
Vyetka	Ветка	8,625
Buda-Kashalyova	Буда-Кашалёва	8,618
Narowlya	Нароўля	8,352
Brahin	Брагін	4,546
Vasilyevichy	Васілевічы	3,285
Turov	Тураў	2,766

== Geography ==
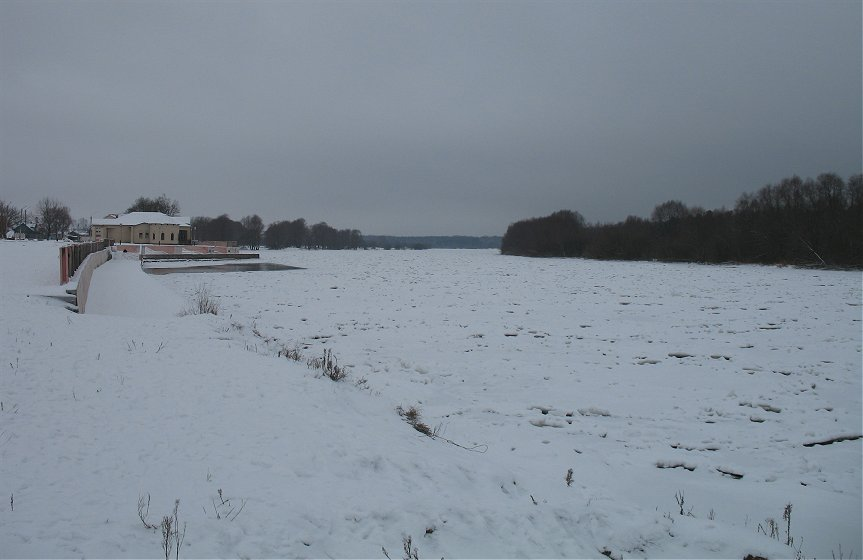
The frozen Biarezina River in Svyetlahorsk

Pripyatsky National Park covers 2% of the territory of the region. Eleven wildlife preserves of national importance cover 2.1% of the region.

The southernmost point of Belarus is located in Gomel region, on the Dnieper River to the south of the urban-type settlement of Kamaryn, Brahin District.

The 3rd largest lake in Belarus, Lake Chervonoye, is located in Gomel region, Zhytkavichy District.

Gomel region borders Mogilev region on the north, Brest region on the west, Russia (Bryansk oblast) on the east and Ukraine (Chernihiv oblast, Kyiv oblast and Zhytomyr oblast) on the south and southeast.

== Demography ==
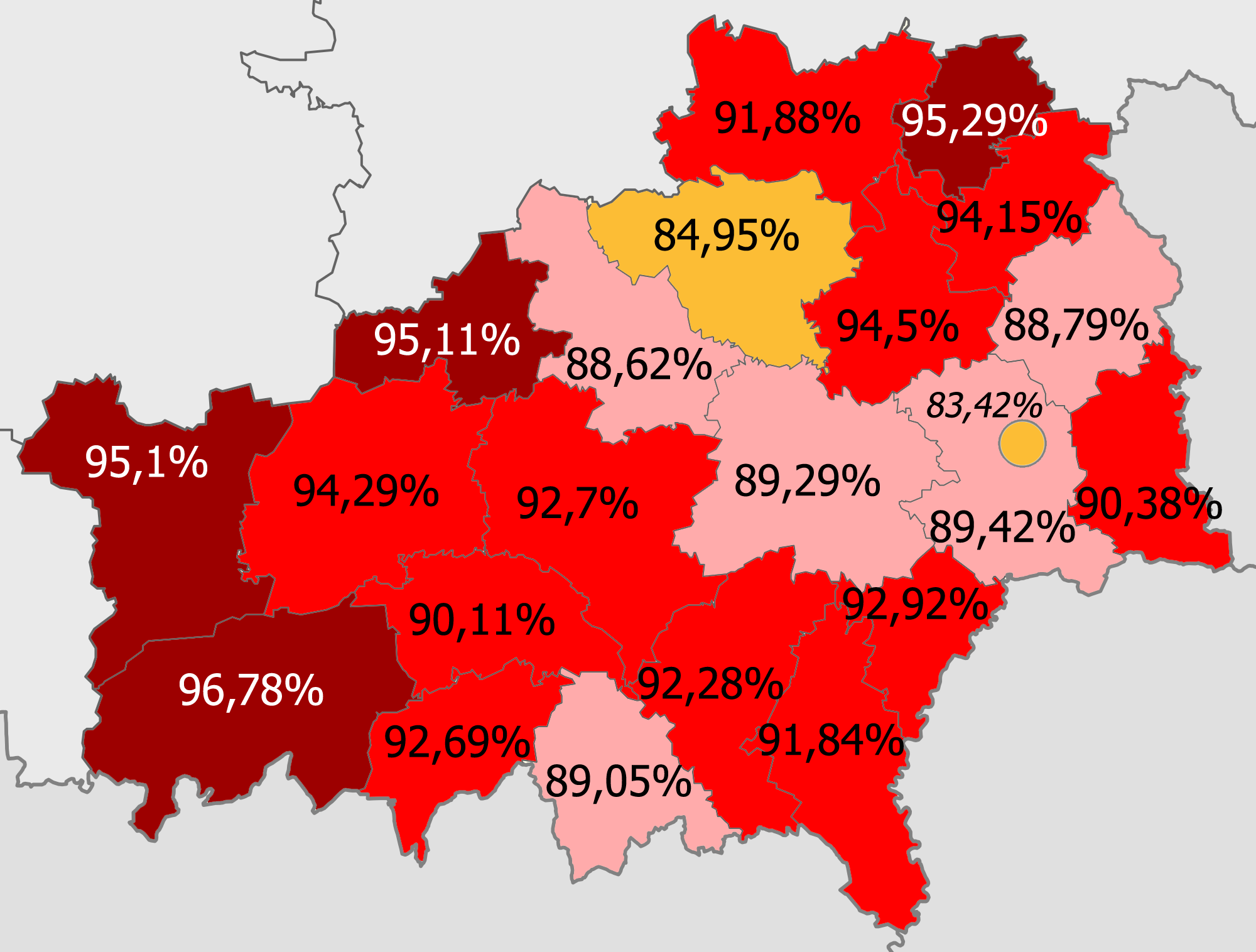
Belarusians in the region
>95%
90–95%
85–90%
<85%

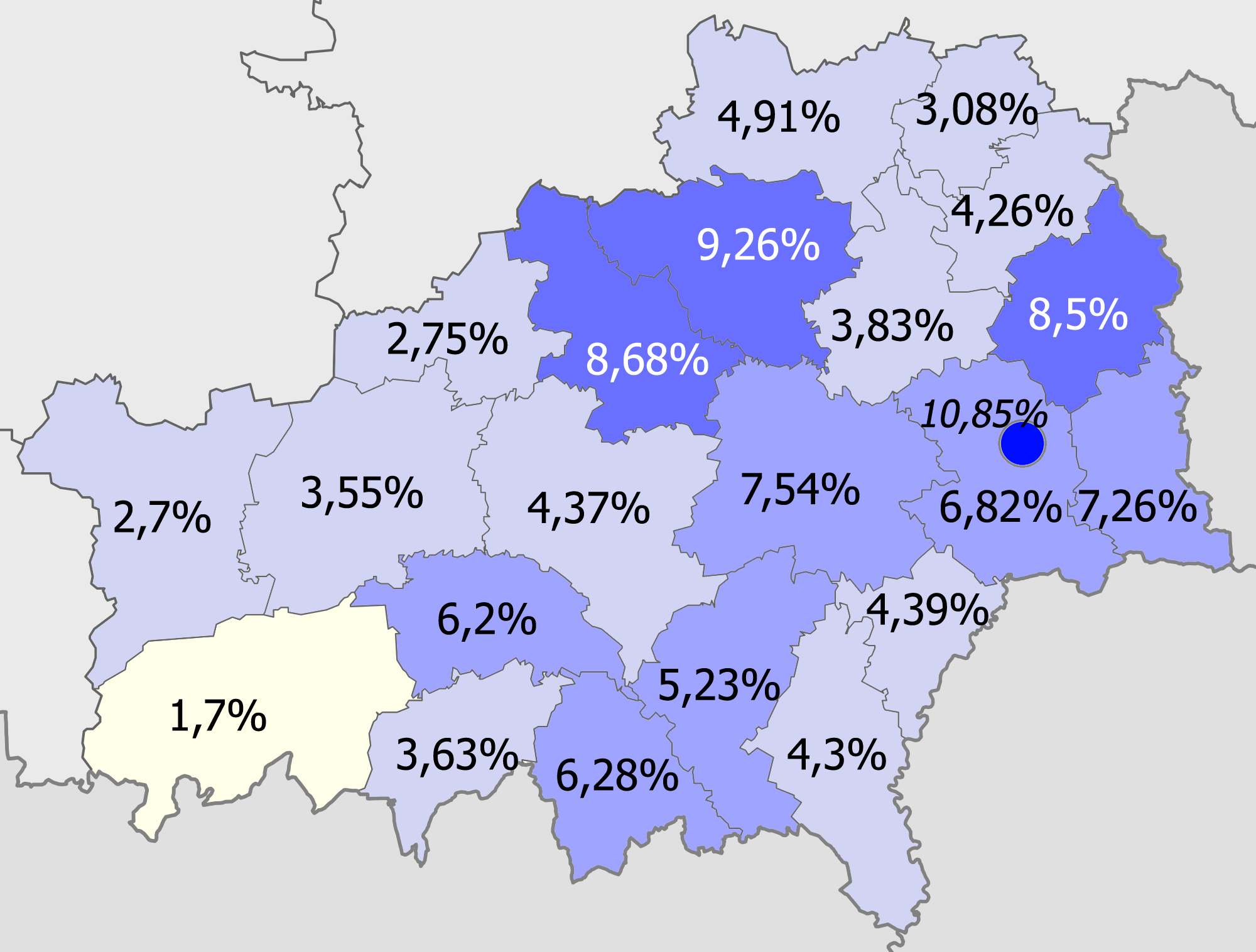
Russians in the region
>10%
8–10%
5–8%
2–5%
<2%

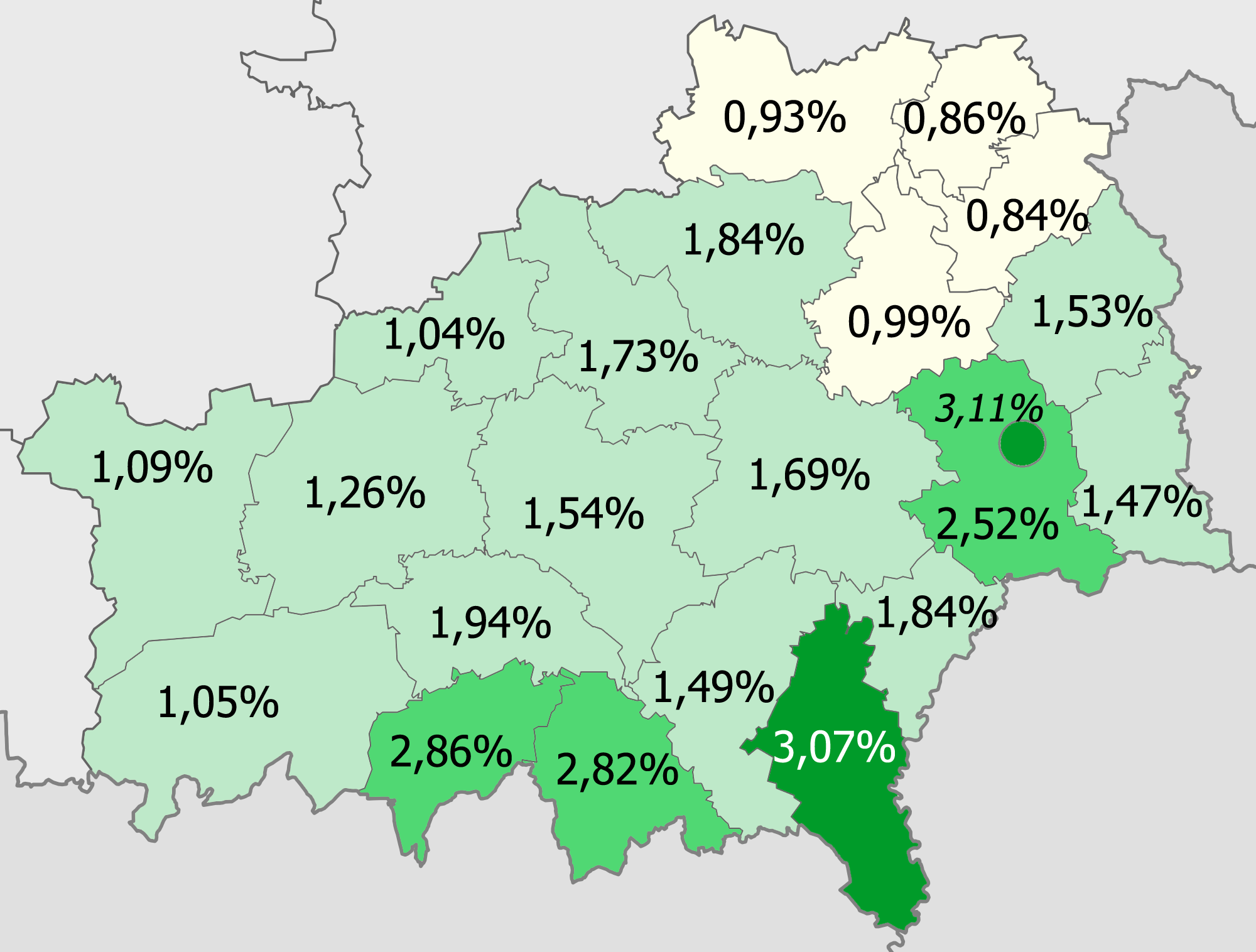
Ukrainians in the region
>3%
2–3%
1–2%
<1%

== Economy ==
The processing industry is represented by alcoholic beverages, such as wine and beer, soft drinks, as well as the vegetable-drying and canning industries. Mazyr is home to one of Belarus' major oil refineries.

== Transport ==
Gomel region is a major transport hub. Major railway junctions include Gomel, Zhlobin, and Kalinkavichy. Gomel is located at the intersection of the highways 95E Odesa–Kyiv–St. Petersburg, Bakhmach–Vilnius, and M10 Bryansk–Brest. River transport is also common in the region with regular navigation on the Pripyat, Dnieper and Berezina rivers.

== Tourism ==
The number of travel agencies in Gomel region has grown from 21 in 2000 to 54 in 2010. The main tourist destinations of the region are Pripyatsky National Park and Gomel.

== History ==
As a result of the disaster at the Chernobyl Nuclear Power Plant, 20 out of 21 districts of the Gomel region were damaged, 357 settlements ceased to exist, about 40 farms and 216 thousand hectares of agricultural land were taken out of operation, 1127 settlements were contaminated, the number of affected population was 749 thousand people. The most affected districts are: Brahin, Khoyniki, Narowlya, Vyetka, Dobrush, Chachersk, Karma. The Polesie State Radioecological Reserve, which is a radioecological nature reserve, is situated in the southern part of the region. It was created to enclose the territory of Belarus most affected by radioactive fallout from the Chernobyl disaster. Children in the Gomel oblast (region) in Belarus received the highest thyroid doses of radiation in the county.
