= Klimovsky (rural locality) =

Name of several Russian rural localities

Klimovsky (Russian: Климовский; masculine), Klimovskaya (Климовская; feminine), or Klimovskoye (Климовское; neuter) is the name of several rural localities in Russia.

== Arkhangelsk Oblast ==
As of 2010, six rural localities in Arkhangelsk Oblast bear this name:

- Klimovskaya, Kargopolsky District, Arkhangelsk Oblast, a village in Priozerny Selsoviet of Kargopolsky District
- Klimovskaya, Konoshsky District, Arkhangelsk Oblast, a village in Klimovsky Selsoviet of Konoshsky District
- Klimovskaya, Nyandomsky District, Arkhangelsk Oblast, a village in Moshinsky Selsoviet of Nyandomsky District
- Klimovskaya, Shenkursky District, Arkhangelsk Oblast, a village in Ust-Padengsky Selsoviet of Shenkursky District
- Klimovskaya, Ustyansky District, Arkhangelsk Oblast, a village in Rostovsky Selsoviet of Ustyansky District
- Klimovskaya, Vilegodsky District, Arkhangelsk Oblast, a village in Belyayevsky Selsoviet of Vilegodsky District

== Ivanovo Oblast ==
As of 2010, one rural locality in Ivanovo Oblast bears this name:

- Klimovskaya, Ivanovo Oblast, a village in Lukhsky District

== Kaluga Oblast ==
As of 2010, one rural locality in Kaluga Oblast bears this name:

- Klimovskoye, Kaluga Oblast, a village in Borovsky District

== Komi Republic ==
As of 2010, one rural locality in the Komi Republic bears this name:

- Klimovskaya, Komi Republic, a village in Noshul Selo Administrative Territory of Priluzsky District

== Kostroma Oblast ==
As of 2010, one rural locality in Kostroma Oblast bears this name:

- Klimovskoye, Kostroma Oblast, a settlement in Sudayskoye Settlement of Chukhlomsky District

== Moscow Oblast ==
As of 2010, one rural locality in Moscow Oblast bears this name:

- Klimovskaya, Moscow Oblast, a village in Krivandinskoye Rural Settlement of Shatursky District

== Tula Oblast ==
As of 2010, three rural localities in Tula Oblast bear this name:

- Klimovskoye, Shchyokinsky District, Tula Oblast, a village in Nikolskaya Rural Administration of Shchyokinsky District
- Klimovskoye, Klimovskaya Rural Territory, Yasnogorsky District, Tula Oblast, a selo in Klimovskaya Rural Territory of Yasnogorsky District
- Klimovskoye, Znamenskaya Rural Territory, Yasnogorsky District, Tula Oblast, a village in Znamenskaya Rural Territory of Yasnogorsky District

== Tver Oblast ==
As of 2010, one rural locality in Tver Oblast bears this name:

- Klimovskoye, Tver Oblast, a village in Udomelsky District

== Vladimir Oblast ==
As of 2010, two rural localities in Vladimir Oblast bear this name:

- Klimovskaya, Sudogodsky District, Vladimir Oblast, a village in Sudogodsky District
- Klimovskaya, Vyaznikovsky District, Vladimir Oblast, a village in Vyaznikovsky District

== Vologda Oblast ==
As of 2010, eight rural localities in Vologda Oblast bear this name:

- Klimovskoye, Cherepovetsky District, Vologda Oblast, a village in Klimovsky Selsoviet of Cherepovetsky District
- Klimovskoye, Totemsky District, Vologda Oblast, a village in Nikolsky Selsoviet of Totemsky District
- Klimovskaya, Babushkinsky District, Vologda Oblast, a village in Demyanovsky Selsoviet of Babushkinsky District
- Klimovskaya, Cherepovetsky District, Vologda Oblast, a village in Abakanovsky Selsoviet of Cherepovetsky District
- Klimovskaya, Totemsky District, Vologda Oblast, a village in Kalininsky Selsoviet of Totemsky District
- Klimovskaya, Mishutinsky Selsoviet, Vozhegodsky District, Vologda Oblast, a village in Mishutinsky Selsoviet of Vozhegodsky District
- Klimovskaya, Nizhneslobodsky Selsoviet, Vozhegodsky District, Vologda Oblast, a village in Nizhneslobodsky Selsoviet of Vozhegodsky District
- Klimovskaya, Vytegorsky District, Vologda Oblast, a village in Tudozersky Selsoviet of Vytegorsky District

== Yaroslavl Oblast ==
As of 2010, five rural localities in Yaroslavl Oblast bear this name:

- Klimovskoye, Nekrasovsky District, Yaroslavl Oblast, a village in Klimovsky Rural Okrug of Nekrasovsky District
- Klimovskoye, Kolodinsky Rural Okrug, Poshekhonsky District, Yaroslavl Oblast, a village in Kolodinsky Rural Okrug of Poshekhonsky District
- Klimovskoye, Yermakovsky Rural Okrug, Poshekhonsky District, Yaroslavl Oblast, a village in Yermakovsky Rural Okrug of Poshekhonsky District
- Klimovskoye, Rybinsky District, Yaroslavl Oblast, a village in Mikhaylovsky Rural Okrug of Rybinsky District
- Klimovskoye, Yaroslavsky District, Yaroslavl Oblast, a village in Teleginsky Rural Okrug of Yaroslavsky District
