= Gorodok, Russia =

Gorodok (Russian: Городок) is the name of several inhabited localities in Russia.

== Modern localities ==
=== Irkutsk Oblast ===
As of 2010, one rural locality in Irkutsk Oblast bears this name:

- Gorodok, Irkutsk Oblast, a settlement in Cheremkhovsky District

=== Ivanovo Oblast ===
As of 2010, one rural locality in Ivanovo Oblast bears this name:

- Gorodok, Ivanovo Oblast, a village in Lukhsky District

=== Kaluga Oblast ===
As of 2010, two inhabited localities in Kaluga Oblast bear this name:

Urban localities

- Gorodok, Zhukovsky District, Kaluga Oblast, a settlement in Zhukovsky District

Rural localities

- Gorodok, Kaluga, Kaluga Oblast, a village under the administrative jurisdiction of the city of Kaluga

=== Kemerovo Oblast ===
As of 2010, one rural locality in Kemerovo Oblast bears this name:

- Gorodok, Kemerovo Oblast, a selo in Utinskaya Rural Territory of Tashtagolsky District

=== Krasnodar Krai ===
As of 2010, one rural locality in Krasnodar Krai bears this name:

- Gorodok, Krasnodar Krai, a khutor in Kurinsky Rural Okrug of Apsheronsky District

=== Krasnoyarsk Krai ===
As of 2010, two rural localities in Krasnoyarsk Krai bear this name:

- Gorodok, Abansky District, Krasnoyarsk Krai, a settlement in Apano-Klyuchinsky Selsoviet of Abansky District
- Gorodok, Minusinsky District, Krasnoyarsk Krai, a selo in Gorodoksky Selsoviet of Minusinsky District

=== Leningrad Oblast ===
As of 2010, two rural localities in Leningrad Oblast bear this name:

- Gorodok, Boksitogorsky District, Leningrad Oblast, a village in Klimovskoye Settlement Municipal Formation of Boksitogorsky District
- Gorodok, Tikhvinsky District, Leningrad Oblast, a village in Gorskoye Settlement Municipal Formation of Tikhvinsky District

=== Lipetsk Oblast ===
As of 2010, one rural locality in Lipetsk Oblast bears this name:

- Gorodok, Lipetsk Oblast, a village in Urusovsky Selsoviet of Chaplyginsky District

=== Moscow Oblast ===
As of 2010, one rural locality in Moscow Oblast bears this name:

- Gorodok, Moscow Oblast, a village in Krasnopakhorskoye Rural Settlement of Podolsky District

=== Nizhny Novgorod Oblast ===
As of 2010, one rural locality in Nizhny Novgorod Oblast bears this name:

- Gorodok, Nizhny Novgorod Oblast, a settlement in Tolsko-Maydansky Selsoviet of Lukoyanovsky District

=== Novgorod Oblast ===
As of 2012, eleven rural localities in Novgorod Oblast bear this name:

- Gorodok, Borovichsky District, Novgorod Oblast, a village in Sushilovskoye Settlement of Borovichsky District
- Gorodok, Khvoyninsky District, Novgorod Oblast, a village in Antsiferovskoye Settlement of Khvoyninsky District
- Gorodok, Lyubytinsky District, Novgorod Oblast, a village under the administrative jurisdiction of the urban-type settlement of Lyubytino, Lyubytinsky District
- Gorodok, Moshenskoy District, Novgorod Oblast, a village in Kalininskoye Settlement of Moshenskoy District
- Gorodok, Novgorodsky District, Novgorod Oblast, a village in Savinskoye Settlement of Novgorodsky District
- Gorodok, Fedorkovskoye Settlement, Parfinsky District, Novgorod Oblast, a village in Fedorkovskoye Settlement of Parfinsky District
- Gorodok, Polavskoye Settlement, Parfinsky District, Novgorod Oblast, a village in Polavskoye Settlement of Parfinsky District
- Gorodok, Poddorsky District, Novgorod Oblast, a village in Poddorskoye Settlement of Poddorsky District
- Gorodok, Gorskoye Settlement, Soletsky District, Novgorod Oblast, a village in Gorskoye Settlement of Soletsky District
- Gorodok, Vybitskoye Settlement, Soletsky District, Novgorod Oblast, a village in Vybitskoye Settlement of Soletsky District
- Gorodok, Volotovsky District, Novgorod Oblast, a village in Slavitinskoye Settlement of Volotovsky District

=== Oryol Oblast ===
As of 2010, one rural locality in Oryol Oblast bears this name:

- Gorodok, Oryol Oblast, a village in Medvedkovsky Selsoviet of Bolkhovsky District

=== Penza Oblast ===
As of 2010, one rural locality in Penza Oblast bears this name:

- Gorodok, Penza Oblast, a settlement in Pushaninsky Selsoviet of Belinsky District

=== Pskov Oblast ===
As of 2010, five rural localities in Pskov Oblast bear this name:

- Gorodok, Bezhanitsky District, Pskov Oblast, a village in Bezhanitsky District
- Gorodok (Pozherevitskaya Rural Settlement), Dedovichsky District, Pskov Oblast, a village in Dedovichsky District; municipally, a part of Pozherevitskaya Rural Settlement of that district
- Gorodok (Vyazyevskaya Rural Settlement), Dedovichsky District, Pskov Oblast, a village in Dedovichsky District; municipally, a part of Vyazyevskaya Rural Settlement of that district
- Gorodok (Polonskaya Rural Settlement), Porkhovsky District, Pskov Oblast, a village in Porkhovsky District; municipally, a part of Polonskaya Rural Settlement of that district
- Gorodok (Pavskaya Rural Settlement), Porkhovsky District, Pskov Oblast, a village in Porkhovsky District; municipally, a part of Pavskaya Rural Settlement of that district

=== Ryazan Oblast ===
As of 2010, two rural localities in Ryazan Oblast bear this name:

- Gorodok, Pitelinsky District, Ryazan Oblast, a village in Potapyevsky Rural Okrug of Pitelinsky District
- Gorodok, Putyatinsky District, Ryazan Oblast, a settlement in Pesochinsky Rural Okrug of Putyatinsky District

=== Samara Oblast ===
As of 2010, one rural locality in Samara Oblast bears this name:

- Gorodok, Samara Oblast, a village in Koshkinsky District

=== Smolensk Oblast ===
As of 2010, thirteen rural localities in Smolensk Oblast bear this name:

- Gorodok, Ushakovskoye Rural Settlement, Dorogobuzhsky District, Smolensk Oblast, a village in Ushakovskoye Rural Settlement of Dorogobuzhsky District
- Gorodok, Usvyatskoye Rural Settlement, Dorogobuzhsky District, Smolensk Oblast, a village in Usvyatskoye Rural Settlement of Dorogobuzhsky District
- Gorodok, Vasinskoye Rural Settlement, Dorogobuzhsky District, Smolensk Oblast, a village in Vasinskoye Rural Settlement of Dorogobuzhsky District
- Gorodok, Gagarinsky District, Smolensk Oblast, a village in Gagarinskoye Rural Settlement of Gagarinsky District
- Gorodok, Kamenskoye Rural Settlement, Kardymovsky District, Smolensk Oblast, a village in Kamenskoye Rural Settlement of Kardymovsky District
- Gorodok, Solovyevskoye Rural Settlement, Kardymovsky District, Smolensk Oblast, a village in Solovyevskoye Rural Settlement of Kardymovsky District
- Gorodok, Khislavichsky District, Smolensk Oblast, a village in Kozhukhovichskoye Rural Settlement of Khislavichsky District
- Gorodok, Monastyrshchinsky District, Smolensk Oblast, a village in Sobolevskoye Rural Settlement of Monastyrshchinsky District
- Gorodok, Novoduginsky District, Smolensk Oblast, a village in Dneprovskoye Rural Settlement of Novoduginsky District
- Gorodok, Pochinkovsky District, Smolensk Oblast, a village in Leninskoye Rural Settlement of Pochinkovsky District
- Gorodok, Safonovsky District, Smolensk Oblast, a village in Baranovskoye Rural Settlement of Safonovsky District
- Gorodok, Stepanikovskoye Rural Settlement, Vyazemsky District, Smolensk Oblast, a village in Stepanikovskoye Rural Settlement of Vyazemsky District
- Gorodok, Vyazma-Bryanskoye Rural Settlement, Vyazemsky District, Smolensk Oblast, a selo in Vyazma-Bryanskoye Rural Settlement of Vyazemsky District

=== Republic of Tatarstan ===
As of 2010, one rural locality in the Republic of Tatarstan bears this name:

- Gorodok, Republic of Tatarstan, a village in Alexeyevsky District

=== Tomsk Oblast ===
As of 2010, one rural locality in Tomsk Oblast bears this name:

- Gorodok, Tomsk Oblast, a selo in Pervomaysky District

=== Tula Oblast ===
As of 2010, one rural locality in Tula Oblast bears this name:

- Gorodok, Tula Oblast, a settlement in Lomovsky Rural Okrug of Bogoroditsky District

=== Tver Oblast ===
As of 2010, fourteen rural localities in Tver Oblast bear this name:

- Gorodok, Bezhetsky District, Tver Oblast, a village in Bezhetsky District
- Gorodok (Guzyatinskoye Rural Settlement), Bologovsky District, Tver Oblast, a village in Bologovsky District; municipally, a part of Guzyatinskoye Rural Settlement of that district
- Gorodok (Berezoryadskoye Rural Settlement), Bologovsky District, Tver Oblast, a village in Bologovsky District; municipally, a part of Berezoryadskoye Rural Settlement of that district
- Gorodok (Rozhdestvenskoye Rural Settlement), Firovsky District, Tver Oblast, a village in Firovsky District; municipally, a part of Rozhdestvenskoye Rural Settlement of that district
- Gorodok (Velikooktyabrskoye Rural Settlement), Firovsky District, Tver Oblast, a village in Firovsky District; municipally, a part of Velikooktyabrskoye Rural Settlement of that district
- Gorodok, Lesnoy District, Tver Oblast, a village in Lesnoy District
- Gorodok, Oleninsky District, Tver Oblast, a village in Oleninsky District
- Gorodok, Ostashkovsky District, Tver Oblast, a village in Ostashkovsky District
- Gorodok, Penovsky District, Tver Oblast, a village in Penovsky District
- Gorodok, Rameshkovsky District, Tver Oblast, a village in Rameshkovsky District
- Gorodok (Kozlovskoye Rural Settlement), Spirovsky District, Tver Oblast, a village in Spirovsky District; municipally, a part of Kozlovskoye Rural Settlement of that district
- Gorodok (Penkovskoye Rural Settlement), Spirovsky District, Tver Oblast, a village in Spirovsky District; municipally, a part of Penkovskoye Rural Settlement of that district
- Gorodok (Podgorodnenskoye Rural Settlement), Toropetsky District, Tver Oblast, a village in Toropetsky District; municipally, a part of Podgorodnenskoye Rural Settlement of that district
- Gorodok (Skvortsovskoye Rural Settlement), Toropetsky District, Tver Oblast, a village in Toropetsky District; municipally, a part of Skvortsovskoye Rural Settlement of that district

=== Vladimir Oblast ===
As of 2010, one rural locality in Vladimir Oblast bears this name:

- Gorodok, Vladimir Oblast, a village in Kameshkovsky District

=== Vologda Oblast ===
As of 2010, two rural localities in Vologda Oblast bear this name:

- Gorodok, Ustyuzhensky District, Vologda Oblast, a village in Dubrovsky Selsoviet of Ustyuzhensky District
- Gorodok, Vologodsky District, Vologda Oblast, a village in Borisovsky Selsoviet of Vologodsky District

=== Yaroslavl Oblast ===
As of 2010, one rural locality in Yaroslavl Oblast bears this name:

- Gorodok, Yaroslavl Oblast, a village in Nikolo-Kormsky Rural Okrug of Rybinsky District

== Renamed localities ==
- Gorodok, name of Gorodok-Dubrovsky, a village in Fedorkovskoye Settlement of Parfinsky District of Novgorod Oblast, until June 2012
- Gorodok, name of Gorodok-Lazhinsky, a village in Fedorkovskoye Settlement of Parfinsky District of Novgorod Oblast, until June 2012

== See also ==
- Bely Gorodok, an urban-type settlement in Tver Oblast
- Lesnoy Gorodok, a suburban (dacha) settlement in Moscow Oblast
- Nauchny Gorodok, an urban-type settlement in Altai Krai
- Novy Gorodok, an urban-type settlement in Kemerovo Oblast
