= Aliaksandr Tsyrkunov =

Belarusian artist

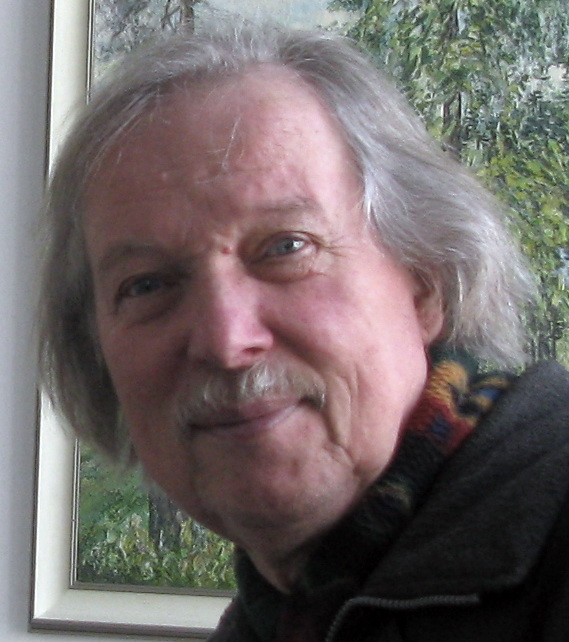
- Born: 28 March 1948 (age 77); Liasań, Žlobin district, Gomel region, Belarus

Aliaksandr Tsyrkunov (also known as Ales Tsyrkunoŭ), is a Belarusian artist, painter and sculptor.

== Biography ==
Tsyrkunov was born on March 28, 1948, in a large family of farmers in the village of Liasań, Žlobin district, Gomel region, Belarus. He grew up in orphanages Dziamjanki, Dobruš district; Pirevičy, Žlobin district; and Vietka. He started painting under influence of Siarhiej Harobčanka and Chviedar Šklaraŭ.

In 1964-67, Tsyrkunov studied and worked in the Petro-Donetsk mine in the Luhansk region of Ukraine. At the same time, he joined a distance course at the Krupskaya People's University of Arts in Moscow. In 1967-69, Tsyrkunov was conscripted for military service.

Tsyrkunov developed his painting skills in Anatol Baranoŭski's studio. In 1970-76, he studied at the Belarusian State Institute of Figurative and Theater Arts (currently the Belarusian State Academy of Arts) where among his teachers were such artists as Chaim Liŭšyc, Barys Arakčejeŭ, Mai Dantsig and Piotr Krochaleŭ. He started participating in exhibitions in 1975. In 1983, he joined the Union of Belarusian Artists. He was a member of the Niamiha group of artists which he left to co-found the Pahonia association.

In 1979-82, Tsyrkunov taught drawing and painting at the Belarusian Polytechnic Institute, and in 1983–84 at a specialist art school (school no. 75) in Minsk.

Tsyrkunov was detained and sentenced to 15 days of arrest for speaking Belarusian and wearing badges with Belarusian symbols during the court hearing of painter Ales Puškin's criminal case on 10 March 2020.

== Works ==
Predominantly, Tsyrkunov works in oil painting, mainly in portrait, historical and landscape genres, and still life. His earlier works leaned towards rigorous style. Later, Tsyrkunov has moved to a symbolic-realistic style, which shows the clear aesthetics of formal painting with characteristic colour dynamic.

The artist likes painting portraits, often of the outstanding Belarusian personalities. This work is characterised by a combination of spiritual and character-typological features. The created images are devoid of a literary plot, they are perceived on the level of sincere and light personal emotion, of intuitive spirit and creative genius.

Many his works are dedicated to history and the present day of Belarus, including the Second World War and Chernobyl tragedy.

A number of Tsyrkunov's solo and group art exhibitions have taken place in Belarus, Lithuania, Latvia, Russia, Ukraine and more.

His works have been acqyuired by the Belarusian National Arts Museum, Belarusian Museum of Modern Arts, Belarusian National History Museum, Belarusiańn Great Patriotic War Museum, Mahilioŭ Arts Museum, Hrodna State Historical Archaeological Museum, Polack Museum of Local Lore, Vietka Museum of Folk Art, Žlobin Museum of History and Local Lore, Pastavy Regional Museum of Local Lore; for private collections in Belarus, Russia, Italy, Poland, Ukraine and more.

Since 1998, alongside painting, Tsyrkunov has started practicisn sculpture. Since 2000, he has produced a number of monumental and memorial works dedicated to historical events and distinguished personalities in Belarus, for example: a monument to Florian Danowski, a participant of the 1863-64 uprising, near the Kaniabičy village (2002); a commemorative cross of Rev Vincent Hadleŭski in Trostyanets Tract, later reinstalled near St. Roch Church in Minsk (2009); and others. Some of them were created in collaboration with other artists.

== Awards ==
The artist has been awarded with the Order of Honour of the Fatherland from the Minsk Heritage Club (1993) and the Masaryk Medal of the Czech Republic (2005).

== Gallery ==
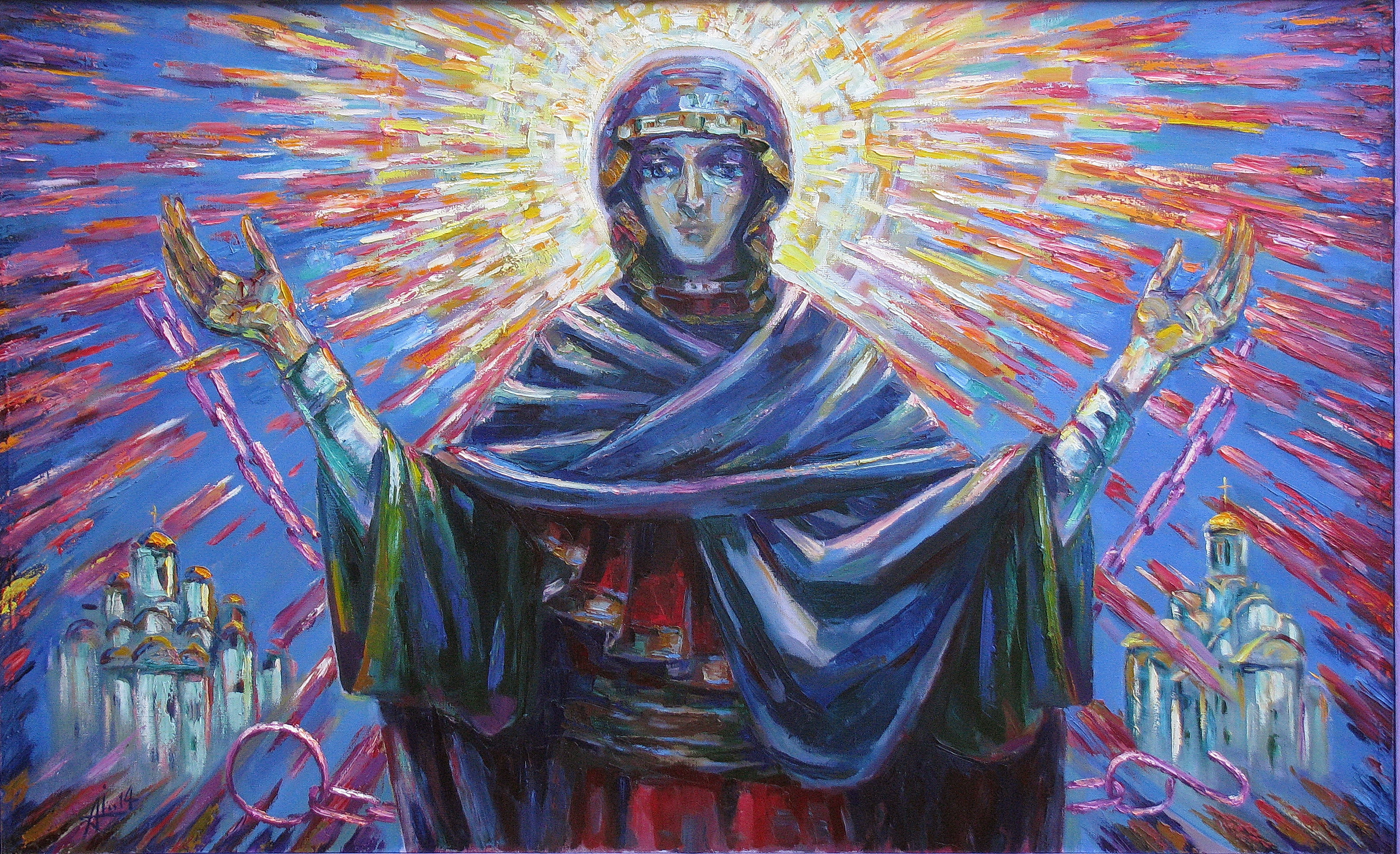
Euphrosyne of Polotsk with Chains (2012)

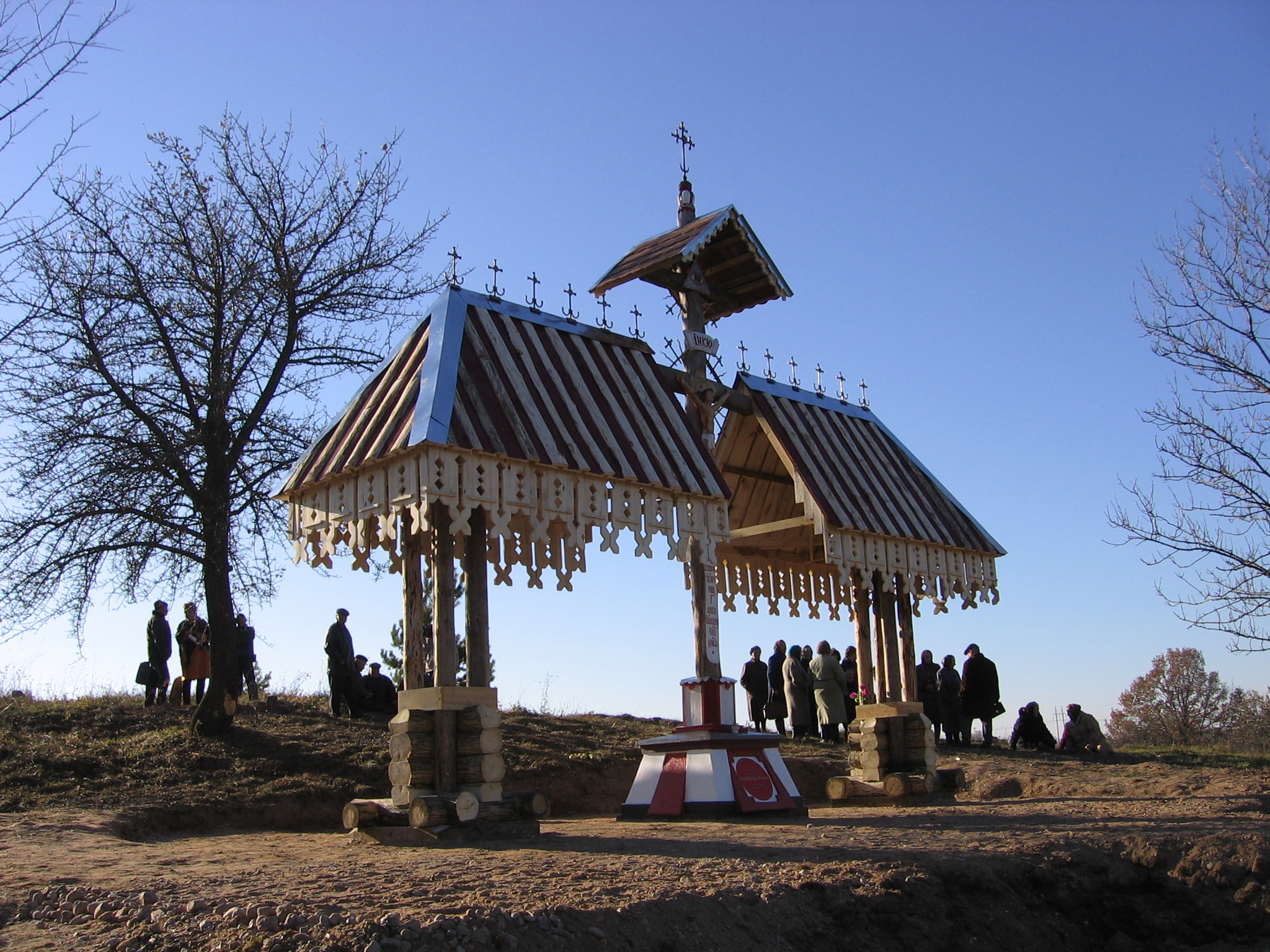
Memorial sign to the 1920 Slucak apprising soldiers (2008)

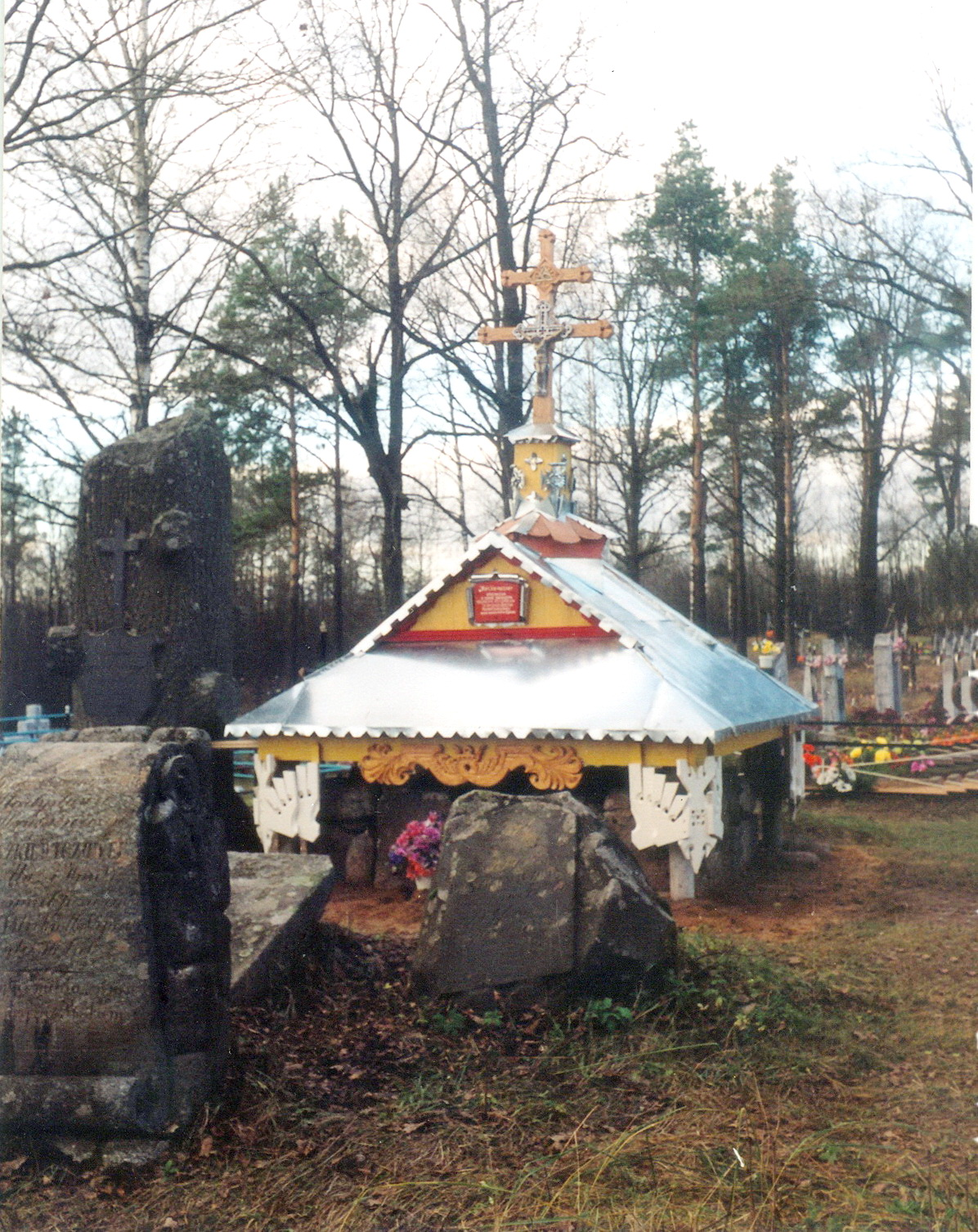
A memorial chapel in honor of the fallen insurgents in the 1794, 1831, 1863 appraisings (2004)

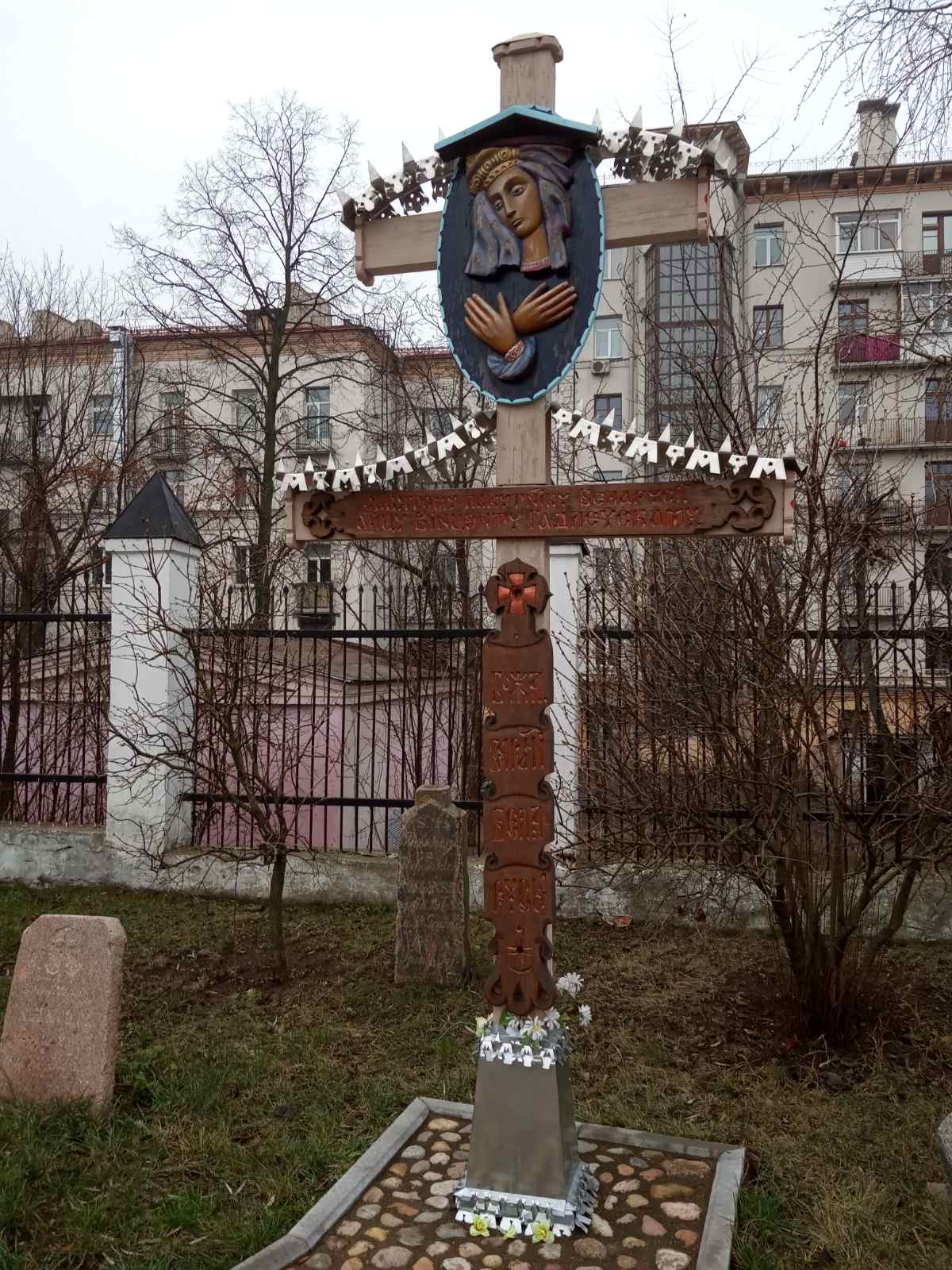
Memorial Cross to priest Vincent Hadleŭski (2009)
