= Blagoveshchenye, Lukhsky District, Ivanovo Oblast =

Blagoveshchenye Благовещенье
- Village
- Location within Ivanovo Oblast Location within Russia
- Coordinates: 57°01′N 42°24′E
- Country: Russia
- Region: Ivanovo Oblast
- District: Lukhsky District
- Time zone: UTC+3:00

Blagoveshchenye (Russian: Благовещенье) is a rural locality (a selo) in Lukhsky District, Ivanovo Oblast, Russia. Population: 256 (2010 census);

== Geography ==
This rural locality is located 9 kilometres (5.6 mi) from Lukh (the district's administrative centre), 87 kilometres (54 mi) from Ivanovo (capital of Ivanovo Oblast) and 322 kilometres (200 mi) from Moscow. Andreyevskaya is the nearest rural locality.
