= Rusinovskaya =

Rusinovskaya Русиновская
- Village
- Location within Ivanovo Oblast Location within Russia
- Coordinates: 57°03′N 42°27′E
- Country: Russia
- Region: Ivanovo Oblast
- District: Lukhsky District
- Time zone: UTC+3:00

Rusinovskaya (Russian: Русиновская) is a rural locality (a village) in Lukhsky District, Ivanovo Oblast, Russia. Population: 214 (2010 census);

== Geography ==
This rural locality is located 13 kilometres (8.1 mi) from Lukh (the district's administrative centre), 90 kilometres (56 mi) from Ivanovo (capital of Ivanovo Oblast) and 326 kilometres (203 mi) from Moscow. Kunino is the nearest rural locality.
