= Sorokino, Lukhsky District, Ivanovo Oblast =

Sorokino Сорокино
- Village
- Location within Ivanovo Oblast Location within Russia
- Coordinates: 57°00′N 42°18′E
- Country: Russia
- Region: Ivanovo Oblast
- District: Lukhsky District
- Time zone: UTC+3:00

Sorokino (Russian: Сорокино) is a rural locality (a village) in Lukhsky District, Ivanovo Oblast, Russia. Population: 209 (2010 census);

== Geography ==
This rural locality is located 4 kilometres (2.5 mi) from Lukh (the district's administrative centre), 82 kilometres (51 mi) from Ivanovo (capital of Ivanovo Oblast) and 316 kilometres (196 mi) from Moscow. Rusino is the nearest rural locality.
