= Krikovshchina =

Krikovshchina Криковщина
- Village
- Location within Ivanovo Oblast Location within Russia
- Coordinates: 56°56′N 42°06′E
- Country: Russia
- Region: Ivanovo Oblast
- District: Lukhsky District
- Time zone: UTC+3:00

Krikovshchina (Russian: Криковщина) is a rural locality (a village) in Lukhsky District, Ivanovo Oblast, Russia. Population: 16 (2010 census);

== Geography ==
This rural locality is located 12 kilometres (7.5 mi) from Lukh (the district's administrative centre), 69 kilometres (43 mi) from Ivanovo (capital of Ivanovo Oblast) and 302 kilometres (188 mi) from Moscow. Danilovskaya is the nearest rural locality.
