= Voskresenskoye Novoye =

Voskresenskoye Novoye Воскресенское Новое
- Village
- Location within Ivanovo Oblast Location within Russia
- Coordinates: 57°04′N 42°30′E
- Country: Russia
- Region: Ivanovo Oblast
- District: Lukhsky District
- Time zone: UTC+3:00

Voskresenskoye Novoye (Russian: Воскресенское Новое) is a rural locality (a selo) in Lukhsky District, Ivanovo Oblast, Russia. Population: 40 (2010 census);

== Geography ==
This rural locality is located 16 kilometres (9.9 mi) from Lukh (the district's administrative centre), 93 kilometres (58 mi) from Ivanovo (capital of Ivanovo Oblast) and 329 kilometres (204 mi) from Moscow. Manshino Bolshoye is the nearest rural locality.
