= Zaprudnovo =

Zaprudnovo Запрудново
- Village
- Location within Ivanovo Oblast Location within Russia
- Coordinates: 57°00′N 42°11′E
- Country: Russia
- Region: Ivanovo Oblast
- District: Lukhsky District
- Time zone: UTC+3:00

Zaprudnovo (Russian: Запрудново) is a rural locality (a village) in Lukhsky District, Ivanovo Oblast, Russia. Population: 231 (2010 census);

== Geography ==
This rural locality is located 4 kilometres (2.5 mi) from Lukh (the district's administrative centre), 74 kilometres (46 mi) from Ivanovo (capital of Ivanovo Oblast) and 310 kilometres (190 mi) from Moscow. Aleksino is the nearest rural locality.
