= Voskresenskoye Staroye =

Voskresenskoye Staroye Воскресенское Старое
- Village
- Location within Ivanovo Oblast Location within Russia
- Coordinates: 57°02′N 42°25′E
- Country: Russia
- Region: Ivanovo Oblast
- District: Lukhsky District
- Time zone: UTC+3:00

Voskresenskoye Staroye (Russian: Воскресенское Старое) is a rural locality (a selo) in Lukhsky District, Ivanovo Oblast, Russia. Population: 16 (2010 census);

== Geography ==
This rural locality is located 11 kilometres (6.8 mi) from Lukh (the district's administrative centre), 89 kilometres (55 mi) from Ivanovo (capital of Ivanovo Oblast) and 324 kilometres (201 mi) from Moscow. Kalikino is the nearest rural locality.
