= Krigouzovo =

Krigouzovo Кригоузово
- Village
- Location within Ivanovo Oblast Location within Russia
- Coordinates: 56°54′N 42°12′E
- Country: Russia
- Region: Ivanovo Oblast
- District: Lukhsky District
- Time zone: UTC+3:00

Krigouzovo (Russian: Кригоузово) is a rural locality (a village) in Lukhsky District, Ivanovo Oblast, Russia. Population: 17 (2010 census);

== Geography ==
This rural locality is located 11 kilometres (6.8 mi) from Lukh (the district's administrative centre), 76 kilometres (47 mi) from Ivanovo (capital of Ivanovo Oblast) and 306 kilometres (190 mi) from Moscow. Yelovo is the nearest rural locality.
