= Yelovki, Ivanovo Oblast =

Yelovki Еловки
- Village
- Location within Ivanovo Oblast Location within Russia
- Coordinates: 57°02′N 42°35′E
- Country: Russia
- Region: Ivanovo Oblast
- District: Lukhsky District
- Time zone: UTC+3:00

Yelovki (Russian: Еловки) is a rural locality (a village) in Lukhsky District, Ivanovo Oblast, Russia. Population: 7 (2010 census);

== Geography ==
This rural locality is located 21 kilometres (13 mi) from Lukh (the district's administrative centre), 99 kilometres (62 mi) from Ivanovo (capital of Ivanovo Oblast) and 333 kilometres (207 mi) from Moscow. Guskino is the nearest rural locality.
