= Rusino, Lukhsky District, Ivanovo Oblast =

Rusino Русино
- Village
- Location within Ivanovo Oblast Location within Russia
- Coordinates: 57°00′N 42°17′E
- Country: Russia
- Region: Ivanovo Oblast
- District: Lukhsky District
- Time zone: UTC+3:00

Rusino (Russian: Русино) is a rural locality (a village) in Lukhsky District, Ivanovo Oblast, Russia. Population: 35 (2010 census);

== Geography ==
This rural locality is located 2 kilometres (1.2 mi) from Lukh (the district's administrative centre), 80 kilometres (50 mi) from Ivanovo (capital of Ivanovo Oblast) and 315 kilometres (196 mi) from Moscow. Myasnikovo is the nearest rural locality.
