= Manshino Bolshoye =

Manshino Bolshoye Маньшино Большое
- Village
- Location within Ivanovo Oblast Location within Russia
- Coordinates: 57°04′N 42°31′E
- Country: Russia
- Region: Ivanovo Oblast
- District: Lukhsky District
- Time zone: UTC+3:00

Manshino Bolshoye (Russian: Маньшино Большое) is a rural locality (a village) in Lukhsky District, Ivanovo Oblast, Russia. The population is 24 (2010 census);

== Geography ==
This rural locality is located 18 kilometres (11 mi) from Lukh (the district's administrative centre), 95 kilometres (59 mi) from Ivanovo (capital of Ivanovo Oblast) and 331 kilometres (206 mi) from Moscow. Voskresenskoye Novoye is the nearest rural locality.
