= Ignatyevskaya =

Ignatyevskaya Игнатьевская
- Village
- Location within Ivanovo Oblast Location within Russia
- Coordinates: 57°00′N 42°30′E
- Country: Russia
- Region: Ivanovo Oblast
- District: Lukhsky District
- Time zone: UTC+3:00

Ignatyevskaya (Russian: Игнатьевская) is a rural locality (a village) in Lukhsky District, Ivanovo Oblast, Russia. Population: 6 (2010 census);

== Geography ==
This rural locality is located 16 kilometres (9.9 mi) from Lukh (the district's administrative centre), 94 kilometres (58 mi) from Ivanovo (capital of Ivanovo Oblast) and 328 kilometres (204 mi) from Moscow. Khakhalino is the nearest rural locality.
