= Gorodilovo =

Gorodilovo Городилово
- Village
- Location within Ivanovo Oblast Location within Russia
- Coordinates: 57°00′N 42°29′E
- Country: Russia
- Region: Ivanovo Oblast
- District: Lukhsky District
- Time zone: UTC+3:00

Gorodilovo (Russian: Городилово) is a rural locality (a village) in Lukhsky District, Ivanovo Oblast, Russia. Population: 37 (2010 census);

== Geography ==
This rural locality is located 15 kilometres (9.3 mi) from Lukh (the district's administrative centre), 93 kilometres (58 mi) from Ivanovo (capital of Ivanovo Oblast) and 327 kilometres (203 mi) from Moscow. Martynovo is the nearest rural locality.
