= Nazarkovo =

Nazarkovo Назарково
- Village
- Location within Ivanovo Oblast Location within Russia
- Coordinates: 56°54′N 42°16′E
- Country: Russia
- Region: Ivanovo Oblast
- District: Lukhsky District
- Time zone: UTC+3:00

Nazarkovo (Russian: Назарково) is a rural locality (a village) in Lukhsky District, Ivanovo Oblast, Russia. Population: 30 (2010 census);

== Geography ==
This rural locality is located 11 kilometres (6.8 mi) from Lukh (the district's administrative centre), 80 kilometres (50 mi) from Ivanovo (capital of Ivanovo Oblast) and 311 kilometres (193 mi) from Moscow. Ilyinskoye is the nearest rural locality.
