= Osokovo =

Osokovo Осоково
- Village
- Location within Ivanovo Oblast Location within Russia
- Coordinates: 56°58′N 42°31′E
- Country: Russia
- Region: Ivanovo Oblast
- District: Lukhsky District
- Time zone: UTC+3:00

Osokovo (Russian: Осоково) is a rural locality (a village) in Lukhsky District, Ivanovo Oblast, Russia. Population: 103 (2010 census);

== Geography ==
This rural locality is located 17 kilometres (11 mi) from Lukh (the district's administrative centre), 95 kilometres (59 mi) from Ivanovo (capital of Ivanovo Oblast) and 327 kilometres (203 mi) from Moscow. Fedosovo is the nearest rural locality.
