= Bakunikha =

Bakunikha Бакуниха
- Village
- Location within Ivanovo Oblast Location within Russia
- Coordinates: 56°56′N 42°22′E
- Country: Russia
- Region: Ivanovo Oblast
- District: Lukhsky District
- Time zone: UTC+3:00

Bakunikha (Russian: Бакуниха) is a rural locality (a village) in Lukhsky District, Ivanovo Oblast, Russia. Population: 69 (2010 census);

== Geography ==
This rural locality is located 11 kilometres (6.8 mi) from Lukh (the district's administrative centre), 86 kilometres (53 mi) from Ivanovo (capital of Ivanovo Oblast) and 317 kilometres (197 mi) from Moscow. Dmitriyevka is the nearest rural locality.
