= Vasinskaya =

Vasinskaya Васинская
- Village
- Location within Ivanovo Oblast Location within Russia
- Coordinates: 56°58′N 42°38′E
- Country: Russia
- Region: Ivanovo Oblast
- District: Lukhsky District
- Time zone: UTC+3:00

Vasinskaya (Russian: Васинская) is a rural locality (a village) in Lukhsky District, Ivanovo Oblast, Russia. Population: 12 (2010 census);

== Geography ==
This rural locality is located 24 kilometres (15 mi) from Lukh (the district's administrative centre), 102 kilometres (63 mi) from Ivanovo (capital of Ivanovo Oblast) and 333 kilometres (207 mi) from Moscow. Makarovskoye is the nearest rural locality.
