= Buyanovo, Ivanovo Oblast =

Buyanovo Буяново
- Village
- Location within Ivanovo Oblast Location within Russia
- Coordinates: 57°02′N 42°11′E
- Country: Russia
- Region: Ivanovo Oblast
- District: Lukhsky District
- Time zone: UTC+3:00

Buyanovo (Russian: Буяново) is a rural locality (a village) in Lukhsky District, Ivanovo Oblast, Russia. Population: 6 (2010 census);

== Geography ==
This rural locality is located 6 kilometres (3.7 mi) from Lukh (the district's administrative centre), 74 kilometres (46 mi) from Ivanovo (capital of Ivanovo Oblast) and 312 kilometres (194 mi) from Moscow. Burdino is the nearest rural locality.
