= Dobritsa =

Dobritsa Добрица
- Village
- Location within Ivanovo Oblast Location within Russia
- Coordinates: 57°03′N 42°41′E
- Country: Russia
- Region: Ivanovo Oblast
- District: Lukhsky District
- Time zone: UTC+3:00

Dobritsa (Russian: Добрица) is a rural locality (a selo) in Lukhsky District, Ivanovo Oblast, Russia. Population: 15 (2010 census);

== Geography ==
This rural locality is located 26 kilometres (16 mi) from Lukh (the district's administrative centre), 104 kilometres (65 mi) from Ivanovo (capital of Ivanovo Oblast) and 339 kilometres (211 mi) from Moscow. Smirenino is the nearest rural locality.
