= Drenevskaya =

Drenevskaya Дреневская
- Village
- Location within Ivanovo Oblast Location within Russia
- Coordinates: 56°59′N 42°35′E
- Country: Russia
- Region: Ivanovo Oblast
- District: Lukhsky District
- Time zone: UTC+3:00

Drenevskaya (Russian: Дреневская) is a rural locality (a village) in Lukhsky District, Ivanovo Oblast, Russia. Population: 5 (2010 census);

== Geography ==
This rural locality is located 20 kilometres (12 mi) from Lukh (the district's administrative centre), 98 kilometres (61 mi) from Ivanovo (capital of Ivanovo Oblast) and 331 kilometres (206 mi) from Moscow. Teplovskaya is the nearest rural locality.
