= Karpovo, Lukhsky District, Ivanovo Oblast =

Karpovo Карпово
- Village
- Location within Ivanovo Oblast Location within Russia
- Coordinates: 56°59′N 42°20′E
- Country: Russia
- Region: Ivanovo Oblast
- District: Lukhsky District
- Time zone: UTC+3:00

Karpovo (Russian: Карпово) is a rural locality (a village) in Lukhsky District, Ivanovo Oblast, Russia. Population: 5 (2010 census);

== Geography ==
This rural locality is located 6 kilometres (3.7 mi) from Lukh (the district's administrative centre), 84 kilometres (52 mi) from Ivanovo (capital of Ivanovo Oblast) and 318 kilometres (198 mi) from Moscow. Stanovo is the nearest rural locality.
