= Kalikino, Lukhsky District, Ivanovo Oblast =

Kalikino Каликино
- Village
- Location within Ivanovo Oblast Location within Russia
- Coordinates: 57°02′N 42°25′E
- Country: Russia
- Region: Ivanovo Oblast
- District: Lukhsky District
- Time zone: UTC+3:00

Kalikino (Russian: Каликино) is a rural locality (a village) in Lukhsky District, Ivanovo Oblast, Russia. Population: 20 (2010 census);

== Geography ==
This rural locality is located 11 kilometres (6.8 mi) from Lukh (the district's administrative centre), 88 kilometres (55 mi) from Ivanovo (capital of Ivanovo Oblast) and 324 kilometres (201 mi) from Moscow. Voskresenskoye Staroye is the nearest rural locality.
