= Timiryazevo, Ivanovo Oblast =

Timiryazevo Тимирязево
- Village
- Location within Ivanovo Oblast Location within Russia
- Coordinates: 57°02′N 42°14′E
- Country: Russia
- Region: Ivanovo Oblast
- District: Lukhsky District
- Time zone: UTC+3:00

Timiryazevo (Russian: Тимирязево) is a rural locality (a selo) in Lukhsky District, Ivanovo Oblast, Russia. Population: 658 (2010 census);

== Geography ==
This rural locality is located 4 kilometres (2.5 mi) from Lukh (the district's administrative centre), 77 kilometres (48 mi) from Ivanovo (capital of Ivanovo Oblast) and 314 kilometres (195 mi) from Moscow. Myasnikovo is the nearest rural locality.
