= Yelovo, Ivanovo Oblast =

Yelovo Елово
- Village
- Location within Ivanovo Oblast Location within Russia
- Coordinates: 56°54′N 42°11′E
- Country: Russia
- Region: Ivanovo Oblast
- District: Lukhsky District
- Time zone: UTC+3:00

Yelovo (Russian: Елово) is a rural locality (a village) in Lukhsky District, Ivanovo Oblast, Russia. Population: 14 (2010 census);

== Geography ==
This rural locality is located 12 kilometres (7.5 mi) from Lukh (the district's administrative centre), 75 kilometres (47 mi) from Ivanovo (capital of Ivanovo Oblast) and 305 kilometres (190 mi) from Moscow. Krigouzovo is the nearest rural locality.
