= Starinskaya =

Starinskaya Старинская
- Village
- Location within Ivanovo Oblast Location within Russia
- Coordinates: 57°03′N 42°32′E
- Country: Russia
- Region: Ivanovo Oblast
- District: Lukhsky District
- Time zone: UTC+3:00

Starinskaya (Russian: Старинская) is a rural locality (a village) in Lukhsky District, Ivanovo Oblast, Russia. Population: 16 (2010 census);

== Geography ==
This rural locality is located 18 kilometres (11 mi) from Lukh (the district's administrative centre), 95 kilometres (59 mi) from Ivanovo (capital of Ivanovo Oblast) and 331 kilometres (206 mi) from Moscow. Svarukha is the nearest rural locality.
