= Slobodki =

Slobodki Слободки
- Village
- Location within Ivanovo Oblast Location within Russia
- Coordinates: 56°55′N 42°20′E
- Country: Russia
- Region: Ivanovo Oblast
- District: Lukhsky District
- Time zone: UTC+3:00

Slobodki (Russian: Слободки) is a rural locality (a village) in Lukhsky District, Ivanovo Oblast, Russia. Population: 211 (2010 census);

== Geography ==
This rural locality is located 10 kilometres (6.2 mi) from Lukh (the district's administrative centre), 83 kilometres (52 mi) from Ivanovo (capital of Ivanovo Oblast) and 314 kilometres (195 mi) from Moscow. Burkovo is the nearest rural locality.
