= Kruzhkovo =

Kruzhkovo Кружково
- Village
- Location within Ivanovo Oblast Location within Russia
- Coordinates: 57°03′N 42°28′E
- Country: Russia
- Region: Ivanovo Oblast
- District: Lukhsky District
- Time zone: UTC+3:00

Kruzhkovo (Russian: Кружково) is a rural locality (a village) in Lukhsky District, Ivanovo Oblast, Russia. Population: 14 (2010 census);

== Geography ==
This rural locality is located 14 kilometres (8.7 mi) from Lukh (the district's administrative centre), 92 kilometres (57 mi) from Ivanovo (capital of Ivanovo Oblast) and 328 kilometres (204 mi) from Moscow. Rusinovskaya is the nearest rural locality.
