= Petrovo, Lukhsky District, Ivanovo Oblast =

Petrovo Петрово
- Village
- Location within Ivanovo Oblast Location within Russia
- Coordinates: 56°56′N 42°16′E
- Country: Russia
- Region: Ivanovo Oblast
- District: Lukhsky District
- Time zone: UTC+3:00

Petrovo (Russian: Петрово) is a rural locality (a village) in Lukhsky District, Ivanovo Oblast, Russia. Population: 9 (2010 census);

== Geography ==
This rural locality is located 8 kilometres (5.0 mi) from Lukh (the district's administrative centre), 80 kilometres (50 mi) from Ivanovo (capital of Ivanovo Oblast) and 312 kilometres (194 mi) from Moscow. Khudynskoye is the nearest rural locality.
