= Kokourovo =

Kokourovo Кокоурово
- Village
- Location within Ivanovo Oblast Location within Russia
- Coordinates: 57°02′N 42°26′E
- Country: Russia
- Region: Ivanovo Oblast
- District: Lukhsky District
- Time zone: UTC+3:00

Kokourovo (Russian: Кокоурово) is a rural locality (a village) in Lukhsky District, Ivanovo Oblast, Russia. Population: 42 (2010 census);

== Geography ==
This rural locality is located 12 kilometres (7.5 mi) from Lukh (the district's administrative centre), 89 kilometres (55 mi) from Ivanovo (capital of Ivanovo Oblast) and 325 kilometres (202 mi) from Moscow. Voskresenskoye Staroye is the nearest rural locality.
