= Vishnya, Ivanovo Oblast =

Vishnya Вишня
- Village
- Location within Ivanovo Oblast Location within Russia
- Coordinates: 57°07′N 42°40′E
- Country: Russia
- Region: Ivanovo Oblast
- District: Lukhsky District
- Time zone: UTC+3:00

Vishnya (Russian: Вишня) is a rural locality (a village) in Lukhsky District, Ivanovo Oblast, Russia. Population: 71 (2010 census);

== Geography ==
This rural locality is located 29 kilometres (18 mi) from Lukh (the district's administrative centre), 104 kilometres (65 mi) from Ivanovo (capital of Ivanovo Oblast) and 341 kilometres (212 mi) from Moscow. Buday is the nearest rural locality.
