= Burkovo, Lukhsky District, Ivanovo Oblast =

Burkovo Бурково
- Village
- Location within Ivanovo Oblast Location within Russia
- Coordinates: 56°55′N 42°20′E
- Country: Russia
- Region: Ivanovo Oblast
- District: Lukhsky District
- Time zone: UTC+3:00

Burkovo (Russian: Бурково) is a rural locality (a village) in Lukhsky District, Ivanovo Oblast, Russia. Population: 22 (2010 census);

== Geography ==
This rural locality is located 10 kilometres (6.2 mi) from Lukh (the district's administrative centre), 83 kilometres (52 mi) from Ivanovo (capital of Ivanovo Oblast) and 315 kilometres (196 mi) from Moscow. Slobodki is the nearest rural locality.
