= Glazunovo =

Glazunovo Глазуново
- Village
- Location within Ivanovo Oblast Location within Russia
- Coordinates: 56°59′N 42°37′E
- Country: Russia
- Region: Ivanovo Oblast
- District: Lukhsky District
- Time zone: UTC+3:00

Glazunovo (Russian: Глазуново) is a rural locality (a village) in Lukhsky District, Ivanovo Oblast, Russia. Population: 12 (2010 census);

== Geography ==
This rural locality is located 22 kilometres (14 mi) from Lukh (the district's administrative centre), 101 kilometres (63 mi) from Ivanovo (capital of Ivanovo Oblast) and 333 kilometres (207 mi) from Moscow. Klimovskaya is the nearest rural locality.
