= Porzdni =

Porzdni Порздни
- Village
- Location within Ivanovo Oblast Location within Russia
- Coordinates: 57°00′N 42°33′E
- Country: Russia
- Region: Ivanovo Oblast
- District: Lukhsky District
- Time zone: UTC+3:00

Porzdni (Russian: Порздни) is a rural locality (a selo) in Lukhsky District, Ivanovo Oblast, Russia. Population: 857 (2010 census);

== Geography ==
This rural locality is located 18 kilometres (11 mi) from Lukh (the district's administrative centre), 96 kilometres (60 mi) from Ivanovo (capital of Ivanovo Oblast) and 329 kilometres (204 mi) from Moscow. Derevenki is the nearest rural locality.
