= Surovtsy =

Surovtsy Суровцы
- Village
- Location within Ivanovo Oblast Location within Russia
- Coordinates: 57°05′N 42°30′E
- Country: Russia
- Region: Ivanovo Oblast
- District: Lukhsky District
- Time zone: UTC+3:00

Surovtsy (Russian: Суровцы) is a rural locality (a village) in Lukhsky District, Ivanovo Oblast, Russia. Population: 10 (2010 census);

== Geography ==
This rural locality is located 17 kilometres (11 mi) from Lukh (the district's administrative centre), 93 kilometres (58 mi) from Ivanovo (capital of Ivanovo Oblast) and 330 kilometres (210 mi) from Moscow. Serkovka is the nearest rural locality.
