= Makarikha, Ivanovo Oblast =

Makarikha Макариха
- Village
- Location within Ivanovo Oblast Location within Russia
- Coordinates: 56°56′N 42°07′E
- Country: Russia
- Region: Ivanovo Oblast
- District: Lukhsky District
- Time zone: UTC+3:00

Makarikha (Russian: Макариха) is a rural locality (a village) in Lukhsky District, Ivanovo Oblast, Russia. Population: 6 (2010 census);

== Geography ==
This rural locality is located 11 kilometres (6.8 mi) from Lukh (the district's administrative centre), 70 kilometres (43 mi) from Ivanovo (capital of Ivanovo Oblast) and 303 kilometres (188 mi) from Moscow. Karizino is the nearest rural locality.
