= Vadishchevo =

Vadishchevo Вадищево
- Village
- Location within Ivanovo Oblast Location within Russia
- Coordinates: 56°57′N 42°07′E
- Country: Russia
- Region: Ivanovo Oblast
- District: Lukhsky District
- Time zone: UTC+3:00

Vadishchevo (Russian: Вадищево) is a rural locality (a village) in Lukhsky District, Ivanovo Oblast, Russia. Population: 17 (2010 census);

== Geography ==
This rural locality is located 10 kilometres (6.2 mi) from Lukh (the district's administrative centre), 70 kilometres (43 mi) from Ivanovo (capital of Ivanovo Oblast) and 304 kilometres (189 mi) from Moscow. Shchelygino is the nearest rural locality.
