= Fedotikha =

Fedotikha Федотиха
- Village
- Location within Ivanovo Oblast Location within Russia
- Coordinates: 57°00′N 42°29′E
- Country: Russia
- Region: Ivanovo Oblast
- District: Lukhsky District
- Time zone: UTC+3:00

Fedotikha (Russian: Федотиха) is a rural locality (a village) in Lukhsky District, Ivanovo Oblast, Russia. Population: 46 (2010 census);

== Geography ==
This rural locality is located 14 kilometres (8.7 mi) from Lukh (the district's administrative centre), 92 kilometres (57 mi) from Ivanovo (capital of Ivanovo Oblast) and 326 kilometres (203 mi) from Moscow. Gorodilovo is the nearest rural locality.
