= Onoshkovo =

Onoshkovo Оношково
- Village
- Location within Ivanovo Oblast Location within Russia
- Coordinates: 57°02′N 42°07′E
- Country: Russia
- Region: Ivanovo Oblast
- District: Lukhsky District
- Time zone: UTC+3:00

Onoshkovo (Russian: Оношково) is a rural locality (a village) in Lukhsky District, Ivanovo Oblast, Russia. Population: 200 (2010 census);

== Geography ==
This rural locality is located 8 kilometres (5.0 mi) from Lukh (the district's administrative centre), 70 kilometres (43 mi) from Ivanovo (capital of Ivanovo Oblast) and 308 kilometres (191 mi) from Moscow. Pavlitsevo is the nearest rural locality.
