= Pestovo, Lukhsky District, Ivanovo Oblast =

Pestovo Пестово
- Village
- Location within Ivanovo Oblast Location within Russia
- Coordinates: 57°03′N 42°13′E
- Country: Russia
- Region: Ivanovo Oblast
- District: Lukhsky District
- Time zone: UTC+3:00

Pestovo (Russian: Пестово) is a rural locality (a village) in Lukhsky District, Ivanovo Oblast, Russia. Population: 51 (2010 census);

== Geography ==
This rural locality is located 6 kilometres (3.7 mi) from Lukh (the district's administrative centre), 76 kilometres (47 mi) from Ivanovo (capital of Ivanovo Oblast) and 314 kilometres (195 mi) from Moscow. Timiryazevo is the nearest rural locality.
