= Kuznechikha, Lukhsky District, Ivanovo Oblast =

Kuznechikha Кузнечиха
- Village
- Location within Ivanovo Oblast Location within Russia
- Coordinates: 56°59′N 42°29′E
- Country: Russia
- Region: Ivanovo Oblast
- District: Lukhsky District
- Time zone: UTC+3:00

Kuznechikha (Russian: Кузнечиха) is a rural locality (a village) in Lukhsky District, Ivanovo Oblast, Russia. Population: 10 (2010 census);

== Geography ==
This rural locality is located 14 kilometres (8.7 mi) from Lukh (the district's administrative centre), 92 kilometres (57 mi) from Ivanovo (capital of Ivanovo Oblast) and 326 kilometres (203 mi) from Moscow. Filino is the nearest rural locality.
