= Filino, Lukhsky District, Ivanovo Oblast =

Filino Филино
- Village
- Location within Ivanovo Oblast Location within Russia
- Coordinates: 57°00′N 42°29′E
- Country: Russia
- Region: Ivanovo Oblast
- District: Lukhsky District
- Time zone: UTC+3:00

Filino (Russian: Филино) is a rural locality (a village) in Lukhsky District, Ivanovo Oblast, Russia. Population: 7 (2010 census);

== Geography ==
This rural locality is located 14 kilometres (8.7 mi) from Lukh (the district's administrative centre), 92 kilometres (57 mi) from Ivanovo (capital of Ivanovo Oblast) and 326 kilometres (203 mi) from Moscow. Kuznechikha is the nearest rural locality.
