= Zabolotye, Lukhsky District, Ivanovo Oblast =

Zabolotye Заболотье
- Village
- Location within Ivanovo Oblast Location within Russia
- Coordinates: 56°58′N 42°14′E
- Country: Russia
- Region: Ivanovo Oblast
- District: Lukhsky District
- Time zone: UTC+3:00

Zabolotye (Russian: Заболотье) is a rural locality (a village) in Lukhsky District, Ivanovo Oblast, Russia. Population: 15 (2010 census);

== Geography ==
This rural locality is located 4 kilometres (2.5 mi) from Lukh (the district's administrative centre), 77 kilometres (48 mi) from Ivanovo (capital of Ivanovo Oblast) and 311 kilometres (193 mi) from Moscow. Steblevo is the nearest rural locality.
