= Klimovsky =

Klimovsky (masculine), Klimovskaya (feminine), or Klimovskoye (neuter) may refer to:

- Klimovsky District, a district of Bryansk Oblast, Russia
- Klimovsky (rural locality) (Klimovskaya, Klimovskoye), name of several rural localities in Russia
