= Haradok, Belarus =

Haradok is a town and the administrative center of Haradok District in Vitebsk Region, Belarus.

Haradok may also refer to:

- Haradok, Brahin District, a village in Brahin District, Gomel Region, Belarus
- Haradok, Buda-Kashalyova District, a settlement in Buda-Kashalyova District, Gomel Region, Belarus
- Haradok, Chachersk District, a settlement in Chachersk District, Gomel Region, Belarus
- Haradok, Chervyen District, a village in Chervyen District, Minsk Region, Belarus
- Haradok, Gomel District, a settlement in Gomel District, Gomel Region, Belarus
- Haradok, Hlusk District, a village in Hlusk District, Mogilev Region, Belarus
- Haradok, Karma District, a village in Karma District, Gomel Region, Belarus
- Haradok, Kastsyukovichy District, a village in Kastsyukovichy District, Mogilev Region, Belarus
- Haradok, Loyew District, a settlement in Loyew District, Gomel Region, Belarus
- Haradok, Lyozna District, a village in Lyozna District, Vitebsk Region, Belarus
- Haradok, Maladzyechna District, an agrotown in Maladzyechna District, Minsk Region, Belarus
- Haradok, Mogilev District, a village in Mogilev District, Mogilev Region, Belarus
- Haradok, Pukhavichy District, a village in Pukhavichy District, Minsk Region, Belarus
- Haradok, Shklow District, a village in Shklow District, Mogilev Region, Belarus
- Haradok, Shumilina District, a village in Shumilina District, Vitebsk Region, Belarus
- Haradok, Ushachy District, a village in Ushachy District, Vitebsk Region, Belarus
- Haradok, Uzda District, a village in Uzda District, Minsk Region, Belarus
- Haradok, Vyetka District, a settlement in Vyetka District, Gomel Region, Belarus
- Haradok, Zhlobin District, a village in Zhlobin District, Gomel Region, Belarus

== See also ==
- Gorodok (disambiguation)
- Horodok (disambiguation)
