= Gorodok =

Gorodok may refer to:

- Gorodok, Russia, several inhabited localities in Russia
- Gorodok Stadium, part of the Luzhniki Olympic Complex, Moscow, Russia
- Gorodok, the kremlin in Zvenigorod, Moscow Oblast, Russia
- Gorodok offensive, Red Army World War II offensive
- Gorodok, TV programme
- Haradok (disambiguation), Belarusian placenames; may be called 'Gorodok' in Russian
- Horodok (disambiguation), Ukrainian placenames; may be called 'Gorodok' in Russian
