= Uladzimir Sodal =

Belarusian historian and journalist

Uladzimir Ilyich Sodal
- Уладзімір Ільіч Содаль
- Born: 13 September 1937; Mormal, Byelorussian SSR, Soviet Union (now Belarus)
- Died: 15 April 2015 (aged 77); Minsk, Belarus
- Resting place: Ostroshytsky graveyard
- Citizenship: Belarus
- Education: Minsk Pedagogical Institute
- Occupations: Journalist, editor, writer
- Writing career
- Pen name: Uladzimir Mormalsky
- Language: Belarusian
- Years active: 1955–2015

Uladzimir Ilyich Sodal (Belarusian: Уладзімір Ільіч Содаль, Russian: Владимир Ильич Содаль; 13 September 1937 – 15 April 2015) was a Belarusian literature historian and journalist.

== Biography ==
Uladzimir Sodal was born on September 13, 1937, in Mormal village, Žlobin District, Gomel Region. He was visually impaired since childhood. In 1961, he married Klara Borisovna Karatkevich, had a son and a daughter.

Graduated from Minsk Pedagogical Institute (1963). Worked as head of Mormal village club, electrician of Murmansk ship repair plant, finished brigade courses of turners, teacher of the Belarusian language and history of Ostroshitsky children's tuberculosis sanatorium, deputy chief editor of magazine "Art of Belarus", editor of the popular science and education programs. In 1967–2000 worked at the Belarusian TV, was the editor of educational programs "Rodnae slova" (1979–2000), "Everyone had his own war".

Was a member of Union of Belarusian Writers (from 1996), Union of Journalists of Belarus. Was a friend of the Republican Rada of Frantsishak Skaryna Belarusian Language Society, editorial board of newspapers "Nasha Slova" and "Society of Belarusian School". Member of the founding congress of the BPF Party, Frantsishak Skaryna Belarusian Language Society, one of the signatories of the creative intelligentsia of the letter to the CPSU Central Committee on the status of the Belarusian language in the republic of Belarus.

Was repeatedly arrested and beaten for his political views. Was against integration of Belarus with Russia and Russian aggression in Ukraine.

Died on April 15, 2015, in Minsk, in the first clinical hospital due to a heart attack. Was buried at the cemetery in Ostroshitsky town next to his mother.

== Creative work, research ==
His first articles were published in 1955 in the newspaper "Pioneer of Belarus". Explored the Belarusian literature and culture in the XIX-XX centuries, life and creative path of Vintsent Dunin-Martsinkyevich, Francišak Bahuševič, Yanka Kupala, Maksim Bahdanovič, Yadvigin Sh., Zoska Veras and others. The author of books "To be called people"(1977), "On the ways of sower" (1982), "Kushlyanski corner" (1990), "Paths of Matej Burachek" (1990), "Zhupranskaya spot" (1992), "I see my land here" (1994), "Sviranskiya kreski" (1995), "Karpilauka" (2001), "Know how to listen" (2003), "That one area of farm Svirany is holy" (2005), "Joke in the mouth" (2008), "Blessed Kushlyany" (2009), "People's Stories" (2009). The compiler of albums "Frantisek Benedict Bogushevich" (1986), "Vincent Jakub Dunin-Marcinkiewicz" (1997). The compiler of collections of works of F. Bahuševič "My pipe" (1987), "To whom pipe is obedient" (1990). The book "Bogatyr from Migauka" (2007) focuses on the life and activities of Alexander Vlasov.

Was the author of script of educational filmstrips about F. Bahuševič, V. Dunin-Martsinkyevich, K. Kalinowski and others.

For literary and research work and struggle for mother tongue was honored by Commemoration Committee with Order "The Pride of the Motherland" and nominal silver ring with the coat of arms (27.11.1997) and the relevant diplomas. Was included in the Book of Honor "Your workers, Belarus".

== Literature ==
- Salamevich I. Sodal // BE in 18 t., T.15, Minsk, 2002.
