= Horodok =

Horodok (Ukrainian: Городок, Ukrainian pronunciation: [ɦoroˈdɔk]) is a Ukrainian name for a small fortified city. As a placename, it may refer to:

== Populated places ==
=== Cities ===
- Horodok, Khmelnytskyi Oblast, Ukraine
- Horodok, Lviv Oblast, Ukraine

=== Urban-type settlements ===
- Horodok, Zhytomyr Oblast

=== Villages ===
There are some eight villages in Ukraine under such name, predominantly in Volhynia. Another village in Chernihiv Oblast was delisted in 2005 due to being abandoned.

- Horodok, Rivne Raion
- Horodok, Ternopil Oblast
- Horodok, Haisyn Raion

== Military installations ==
- Horodok (air base), near the city of Horodok, Lviv Oblast

== See also ==
- Gorodok (disambiguation), Russian placenames
- Haradok, Belarus, Belarusian placenames
