= Nauchny Gorodok =

Nauchny Gorodok Научный Городок
- Settlement
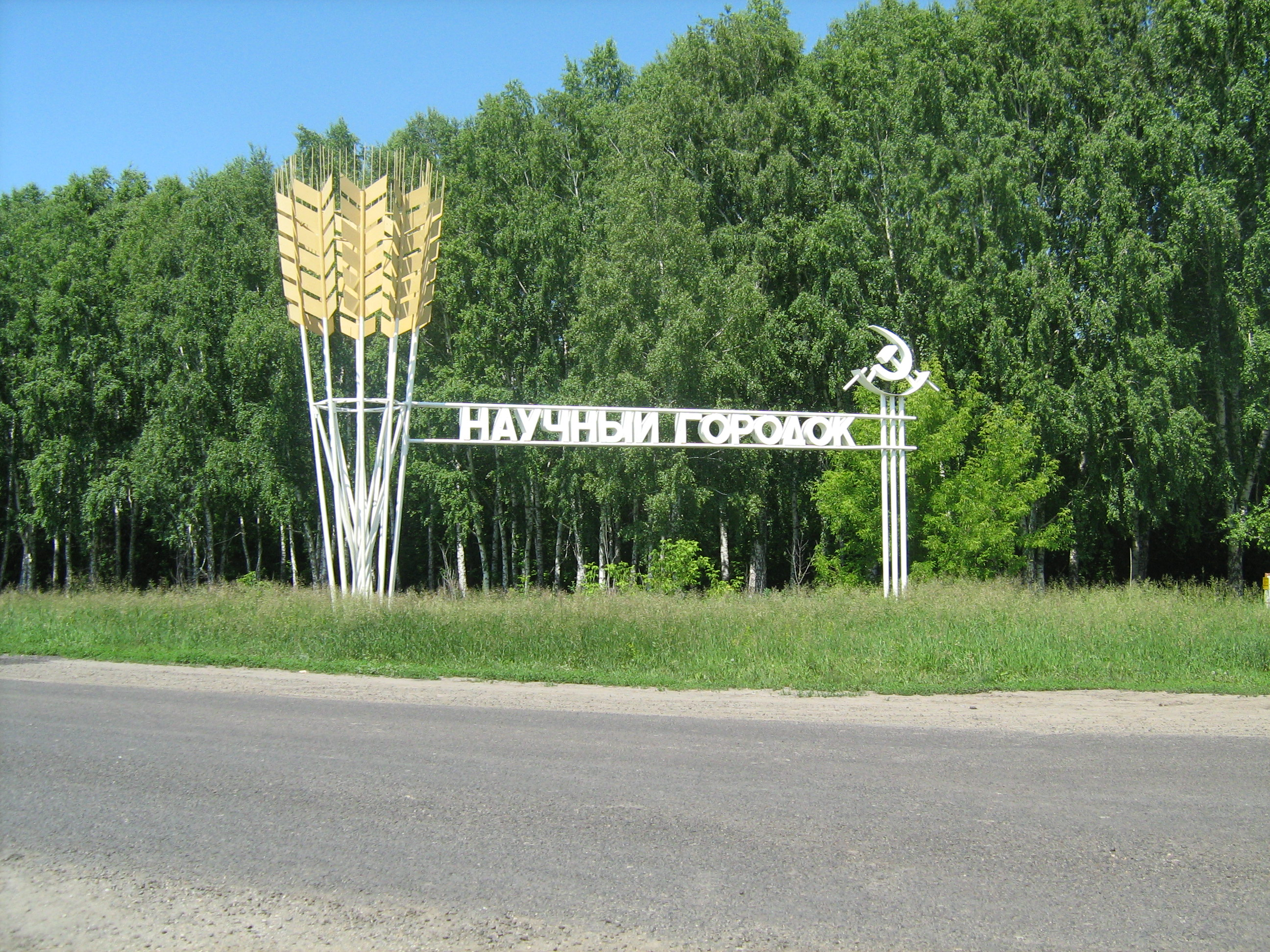

- Location within Altai Krai Location within Russia
- Coordinates: 53°25′N 83°31′E
- Country: Russia
- Region: Altai Krai
- District: Barnaul
- Time zone: UTC+7:00

Nauchny Gorodok (Russian: Научный Городок) is a rural locality (a settlement) in Barnaul, Altai Krai, Russia. The population was 3,005 as of 2013. There are 22 streets.

== Geography ==
Nauchny Gorodok is located 22 km northwest of Barnaul by road. Gonba is the nearest rural locality.
