= Klimovskaya, Cherepovetsky District, Vologda Oblast =

Klimovskaya Климовская
- Village
- Location within Vologda Oblast Location within Russia
- Coordinates: 59°19′N 37°31′E
- Country: Russia
- Region: Vologda Oblast
- District: Cherepovetsky District
- Time zone: UTC+3:00

Klimovskaya (Russian: Климовская) is a rural locality (a village) in Abakanovskoye Rural Settlement, Cherepovetsky District, Vologda Oblast, Russia. The population was 10 as of 2002.

== Geography ==
Klimovskaya is located 31 km (19 mi) northeast of Cherepovets (the district's administrative centre) by road. Popovskoye is the nearest rural locality.
