= Klimovskaya, Sudogodsky District, Vladimir Oblast =

Klimovskaya Климовская
- Village
- Location within Vladimir Oblast Location within Russia
- Coordinates: 55°53′N 40°31′E
- Country: Russia
- Region: Vladimir Oblast
- District: Sudogodsky District
- Time zone: UTC+3:00

Klimovskaya (Russian: Климовская) is a rural locality (a village) in Golovinskoye Rural Settlement, Sudogodsky District, Vladimir Oblast, Russia. The population was 23 as of 2010.

== Geography ==
Klimovskaya is located 29 kilometres (18 mi) west of Sudogda (the district's administrative centre) by road. Mirnoye is the nearest rural locality.
