= Klimovskaya, Totemsky District, Vologda Oblast =

Klimovskaya Климовская
- Village
- Location within Vologda Oblast Location within Russia
- Coordinates: 59°51′N 42°22′E
- Country: Russia
- Region: Vologda Oblast
- District: Totemsky District
- Time zone: UTC+3:00

Klimovskaya (Russian: Климовская) is a rural locality (a village) in Kalininskoye Rural Settlement, Totemsky District, Vologda Oblast, Russia. The population was 52 as of 2002.

== Geography ==
Klimovskaya is located 28 km southwest of Totma (the district's administrative centre) by road. Maximovskaya is the nearest rural locality.
