= Klimovskaya, Konoshsky District, Arkhangelsk Oblast =

Klimovskaya Климовская
- Village
- Location within Arkhangelsk Oblast Location within Russia
- Coordinates: 60°51′N 39°30′E
- Country: Russia
- Region: Arkhangelsk Oblast
- District: Konoshsky District
- Time zone: UTC+3:00

Klimovskaya (Russian: Климовская) is a rural locality (a village) in Konoshsky District, Arkhangelsk Oblast, Russia. The population was 241 as of 2010. There are 5 streets.

== Geography ==
Klimovskaya is located on the Svyatoye Lake, 45 km southwest of Konosha (the district's administrative centre) by road. Vershinino is the nearest locality.
