= Klimovskaya, Nizhneslobodsky Selsoviet, Vozhegodsky District, Vologda Oblast =

Klimovskaya Климовская
- Village
- Location within Vologda Oblast Location within Russia
- Coordinates: 60°30′N 41°00′E
- Country: Russia
- Region: Vologda Oblast
- District: Vozhegodsky District
- Time zone: UTC+3:00

Klimovskaya (Russian: Климовская) is a rural locality (a village) in Nizhneslobodskoye Rural Settlement, Vozhegodsky District, Vologda Oblast, Russia. The population was 2 as of 2002.

== Geography ==
The distance to Vozhega is 54 km, to Derevenka is 5 km. Kholdynka, Yurkovskaya, Todelovskaya are the nearest rural localities.
