= Gorodok, Vladimir Oblast =

Gorodok Городок
- Village
- Location within Vladimir Oblast Location within Russia
- Coordinates: 56°15′N 40°50′E
- Country: Russia
- Region: Vladimir Oblast
- District: Kameshkovsky District
- Time zone: UTC+3:00

Gorodok (Russian: Городок) is a rural locality (a village) in Vtorovskoye Rural Settlement, Kameshkovsky District, Vladimir Oblast, Russia. The population was 15 as of 2010.

== Geography ==
Gorodok is located 16 km southwest of Kameshkovo (the district's administrative centre) by road. Kurmenevo is the nearest rural locality.
