= Klimovskoye, Cherepovetsky District, Vologda Oblast =

Klimovskoye Климовское
- Village
- Location within Vologda Oblast Location within Russia
- Coordinates: 59°20′N 38°01′E
- Country: Russia
- Region: Vologda Oblast
- District: Cherepovetsky District
- Time zone: UTC+3:00

Klimovskoye (Russian: Климовское) is a rural locality (a village) and the administrative center of Klimovskoye Rural Settlement, Cherepovetsky District, Vologda Oblast, Russia. The population was 2,471 as of 2002. There are 3 streets.

== Geography ==
Klimovskoye is located 31 km (19 mi) northeast of Cherepovets (the district's administrative centre) by road. Gavrino is the nearest rural locality.
