= Zhlobin =

Town in Gomel Region, Belarus

Zhlobin Жлобін (Belarusian) Жлобин (Russian)
- Town
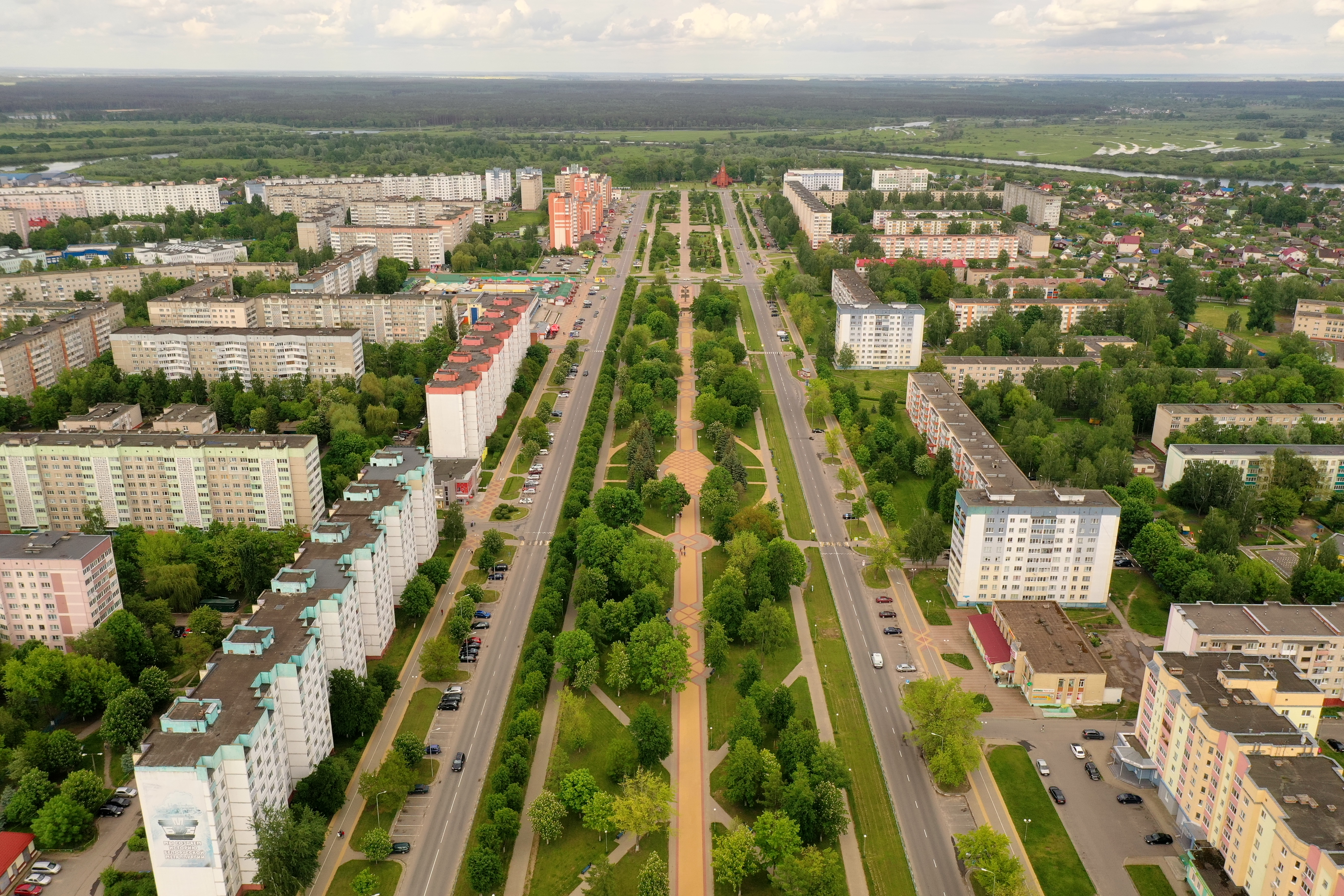
- Aerial view

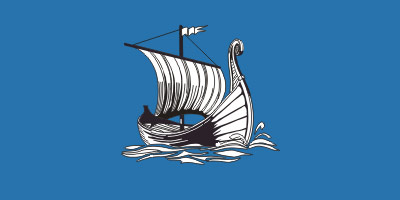
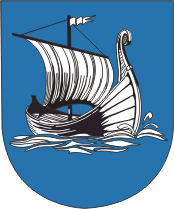
- Flag Coat of arms

- Location within Belarus
- Coordinates: 52°54′N 30°02′E
- Country: Belarus
- Region: Gomel Region
- District: Zhlobin District
- First mention: 1654

Area
  - Total: 38.41 km^{2} (14.83 sq mi)
- Elevation: 140 m (460 ft)

Population (2025)
  - Total: 76,304
  - Density: 1,987/km^{2} (5,145/sq mi)
- Time zone: UTC+3 (MSK)
- Postal code: 24719x
- Area code: +375 2334
- License plate: 3
- Website: Official website

Zhlobin (Belarusian: Жлобін; Russian: Жлобин; Polish: Żłobin) is a town in Gomel Region, in eastern Belarus. It is located on the Dnieper River, and serves as the administrative center of Zhlobin District. It is situated 83 kilometres (52 mi) from Gomel. As of 2025, it has a population of 76,304.

The town is notable for being the location where steelmaker BMZ was established. BMZ is one of the largest companies in Belarus, and an important producer in the worldwide markets of steel wires and cords. The company is the main sustainer of the town's economy.

== History ==
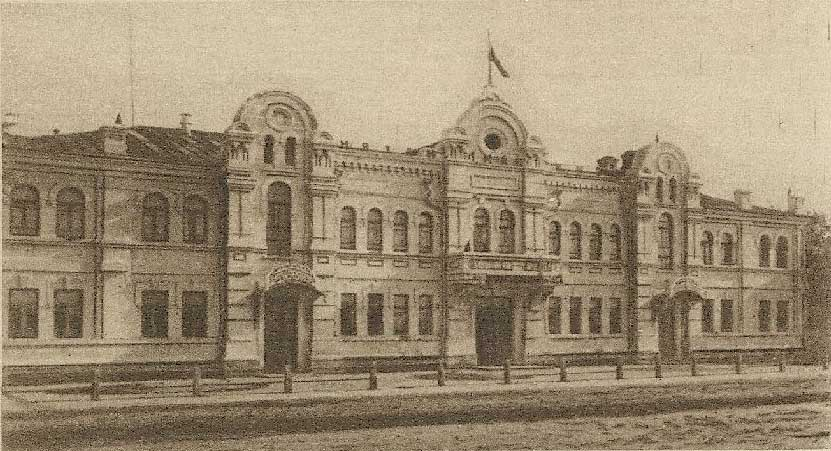
Railwaymen's Club in the interbellum

Zhlobin was a private town of the Chodkiewicz family. The town was often invaded by Muscovite forces and during the Lithuanian–Muscovite War it was annexed by Muscovy, but shortly afterwards restored to Lithuania.

In 1939, 19% of the town's population was Jewish. During World War II, Zhlobin was occupied by the German Army from 3 July 1941 until 13 July 1944. The Nazis captured the Jews and imprisoned them in 2 different ghettos, where they suffered from starvation, disease and abuse. On April 12, 1942, 1,200 Jews were murdered in the ghettos.

== Notable natives ==
- Lev Tamkov — Belarusian architect
- Vsevolod Steburaka — Belarusian poet and novelist
- Mikhail Bykov — Hero of the Soviet Union, commander of an aviation squadron
- Sergey Matveychik — Belarusian football player.
- Artyom Levshunov — NHL hockey player for the Chicago Blackhawks.

== Demographics ==
Historical population

Year	Pop.	±%
1997	69,800	—
2023	77,049	+10.4%

Year	Pop.	±%
2024	76,844	−0.3%

== Sport ==
Metallurg Zhlobin of the Belarusian Extraleague is the local pro hockey team.

== Industrial enterprises ==
- OJSC "BMZ - managing company of the holding" BMK "
- Branch of JSC "RMCC" "Zhlobin Dairy Plant"
- PUE "Zhlobinselkhozkhimiya"
- OJSC "Zhlobin garment factory"
- State enterprise "Zhlobin mobile mechanized column 71"
- JSC "AFPK "Zhlobin Meat Processing Plant"
- JSC "BelFa"
- Zhlobin bakery
- OJSC "Zhlobinmebel"
- TPU "Metallurgtorg"

== Twin towns – sister cities ==
Zhlobin is twinned with:

- Scalenghe, Italy (since 1992)
- Smederevo, Serbia
- Vyksa, Russia

== Gallery ==
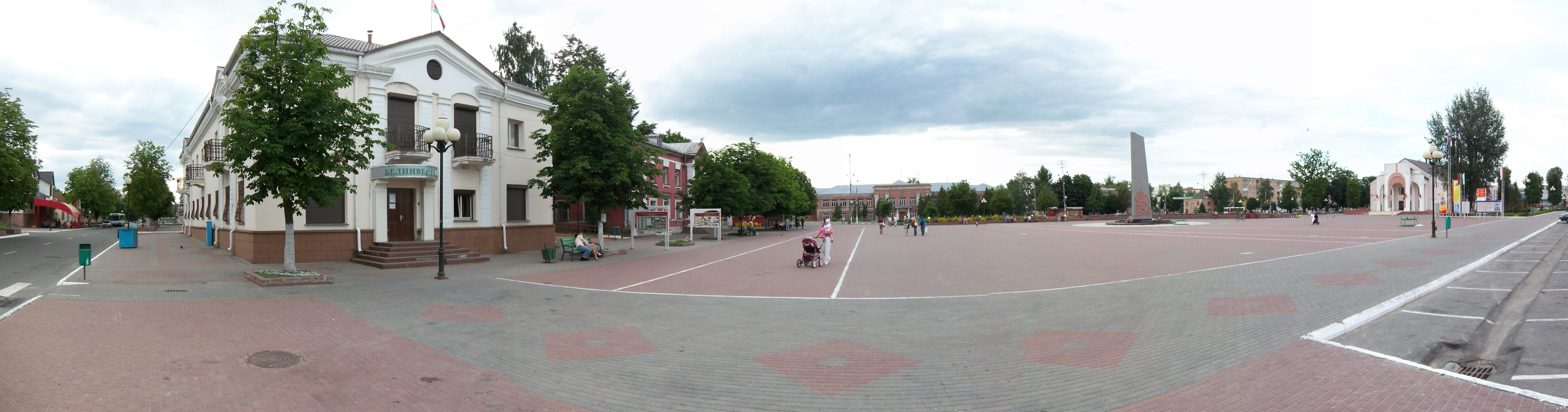
Downtown
