= Gorodok, Ustyuzhensky District, Vologda Oblast =

Gorodok Городок
- Village
- Location within Vologda Oblast Location within Russia
- Coordinates: 58°32′N 36°14′E
- Country: Russia
- Region: Vologda Oblast
- District: Ustyuzhensky District
- Time zone: UTC+3:00

Gorodok (Russian: Городок) is a rural locality (a village) in Nikolskoye Rural Settlement, Ustyuzhensky District, Vologda Oblast, Russia. The population was 21 as of 2002.

== Geography ==
Gorodok is located 44 km (27 mi) south of Ustyuzhna (the district's administrative centre) by road. Kresttsy is the nearest rural locality.
