= Klimovskaya, Mishutinsky Selsoviet, Vozhegodsky District, Vologda Oblast =

Klimovskaya Климовская
- Village
- Location within Vologda Oblast Location within Russia
- Coordinates: 60°29′N 41°08′E
- Country: Russia
- Region: Vologda Oblast
- District: Vozhegodsky District
- Time zone: UTC+3:00

Klimovskaya (Russian: Климовская) is a rural locality (a village) in Mishutinskoye Rural Settlement, Vozhegodsky District, Vologda Oblast, Russia. The population was 13 as of 2002.

== Geography ==
The distance to Vozhega is 60 km, to Mishutinskaya is 6 km. Lukyanovskaya, Gorka, Pogorelka are the nearest rural localities.
