= Church of the Holy Trinity, Minsk =

Roman Catholic church in Minsk, Belarus

Church of Holy Trinity Касцёл Найсвяцейшай Тройцы
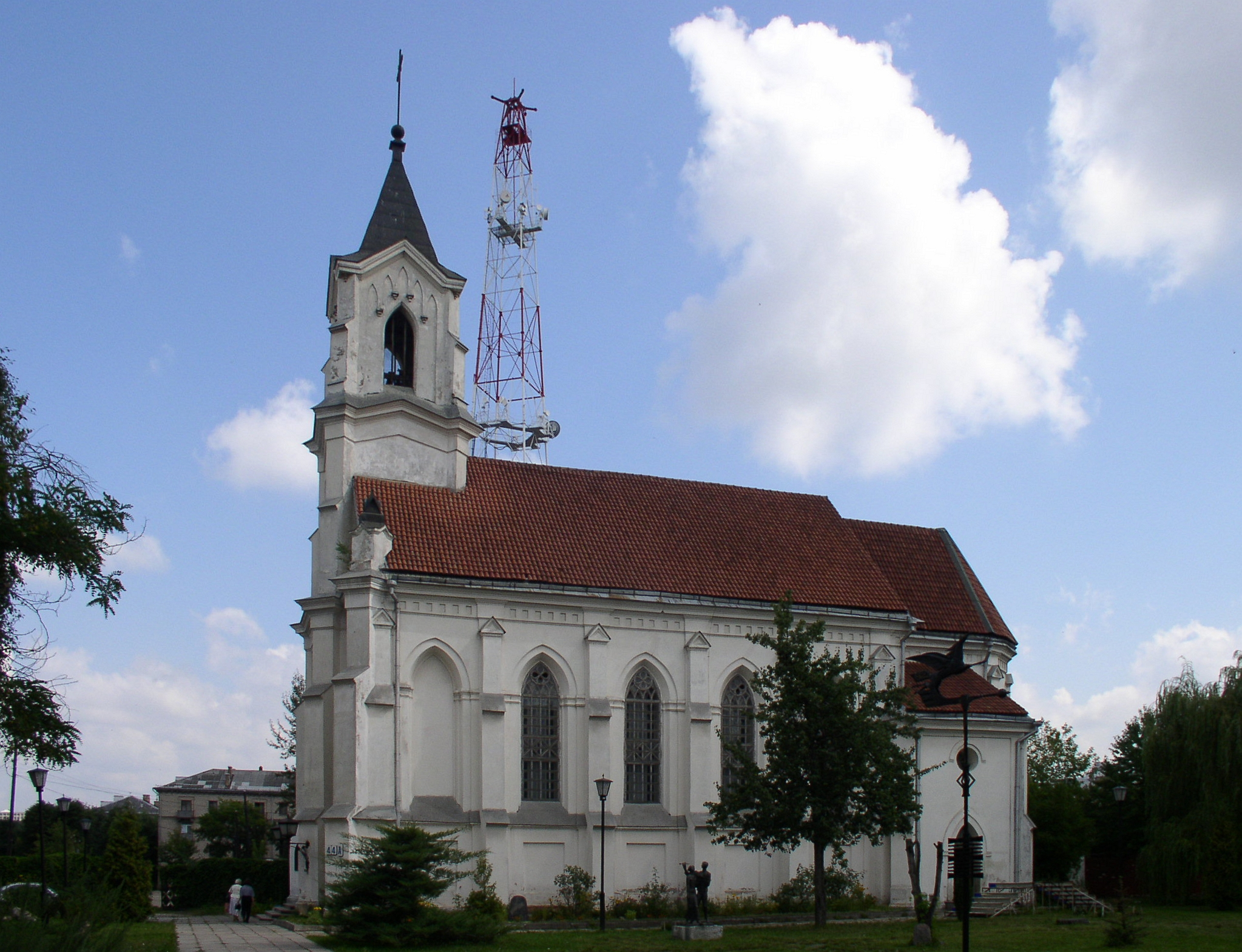
- Church of Holy Trinity

Religion
- Affiliation: Roman Catholic
- Year consecrated: 1864

Location
- Location: Minsk, Nezavisimosti square, 44A
- Country: Belarus
- Interactive map of Church of Holy Trinity; Касцёл Найсвяцейшай Тройцы
- Coordinates: 53°54′39.9″N 27°34′47.9″E

Architecture
- Architect: M. Sivitskiy
- Type: Neogothic
- Completed: 1864
- Height (max): 4.2 m

Website
- roch.by

Church of Holy Trinity (Belarusian: Касцёл Найсвяцейшай Тройцы) also known as St. Roch on the Golden Hill is a Roman Catholic church in Minsk. In the 1930s, the church was closed and the valuables removed by the Soviet authorities. Renovation of the church started in 1983.

== History ==
The king Władysław II Jagiełło established the first parish of the Holy Trinity in Minsk in the 14th century. It was the first Catholic parish in the city that has preserved documentary evidence. The king founded a wooden church on the Troitskaya hill, but in 1409 it was destroyed by fire. The rebuilt church was burned again in 1809. Lack of funds didn't allow the parish to reconstruct it, so in 1832 the wooden chapel of St. Roch was made the parish's church.

By the mid-19th century the wooden church decapitated. Local bishop Voytkevich managed to receive a building permit on a stone church. It was constructed in 1861-1864 by the architect Sivitsky, a graduate of the Imperial Academy of Arts. The Neo Gothic church was built on donations of all citizens of different confessions, because they believed that St. Roch saved them from cholera.

The new church was consecrated on November 1, 1864, under the names of St Roch and the Assumption of the Blessed Virgin Mary. The wooden statue of St Roch was widely worshiped and considered miraculous, thousands of pilgrims visited it on August 16.

The documents of 1908 describe the church as a building under zinc roof, with 12 windows, five sazhens high and 12.5 sazhens long. The belltower had three main bells that were called Leonard, Stephan and Bronislava. The altar had an icon of the Virgin Mary with a child.

After the Russian Revolution all the relics and valuable items were requisitioned, in 1930 the church was closed. At that time the miraculous statue of St Roch had disappeared. In June 1941, during the World War II, the church was severely damaged by bombings.

After the war the church cemetery was destroyed and overbuilt with residential blocks. In 1983 the church was restored and started serving as a music hall of the Belarusian State Philharmonic. In 1984 the pipe organ was installed in the apse.

In 1991 the church services started again. The new statue of St Roch was made in 1998 by the sculptor Valerian Yanushkevich.

== Gallery ==
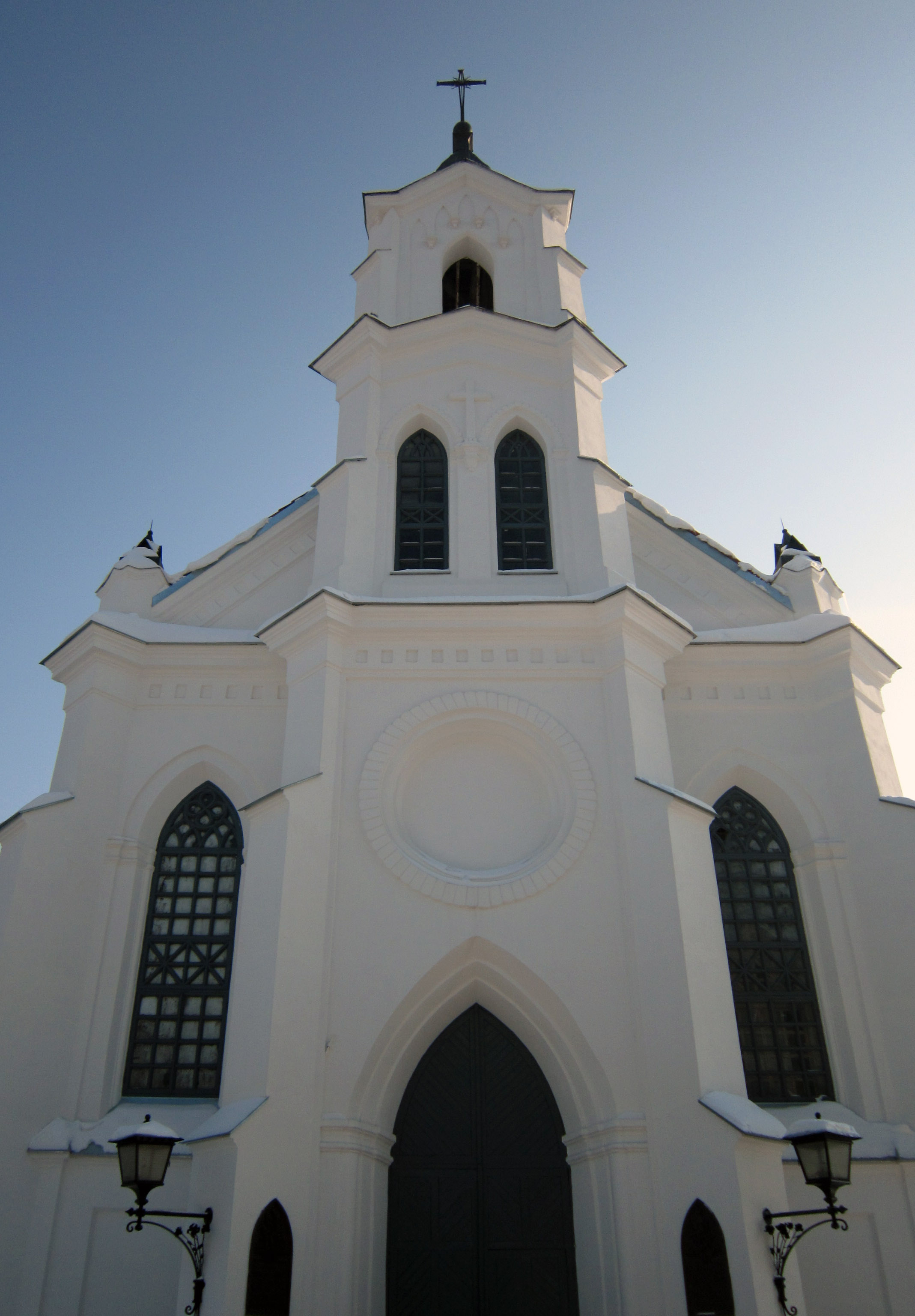

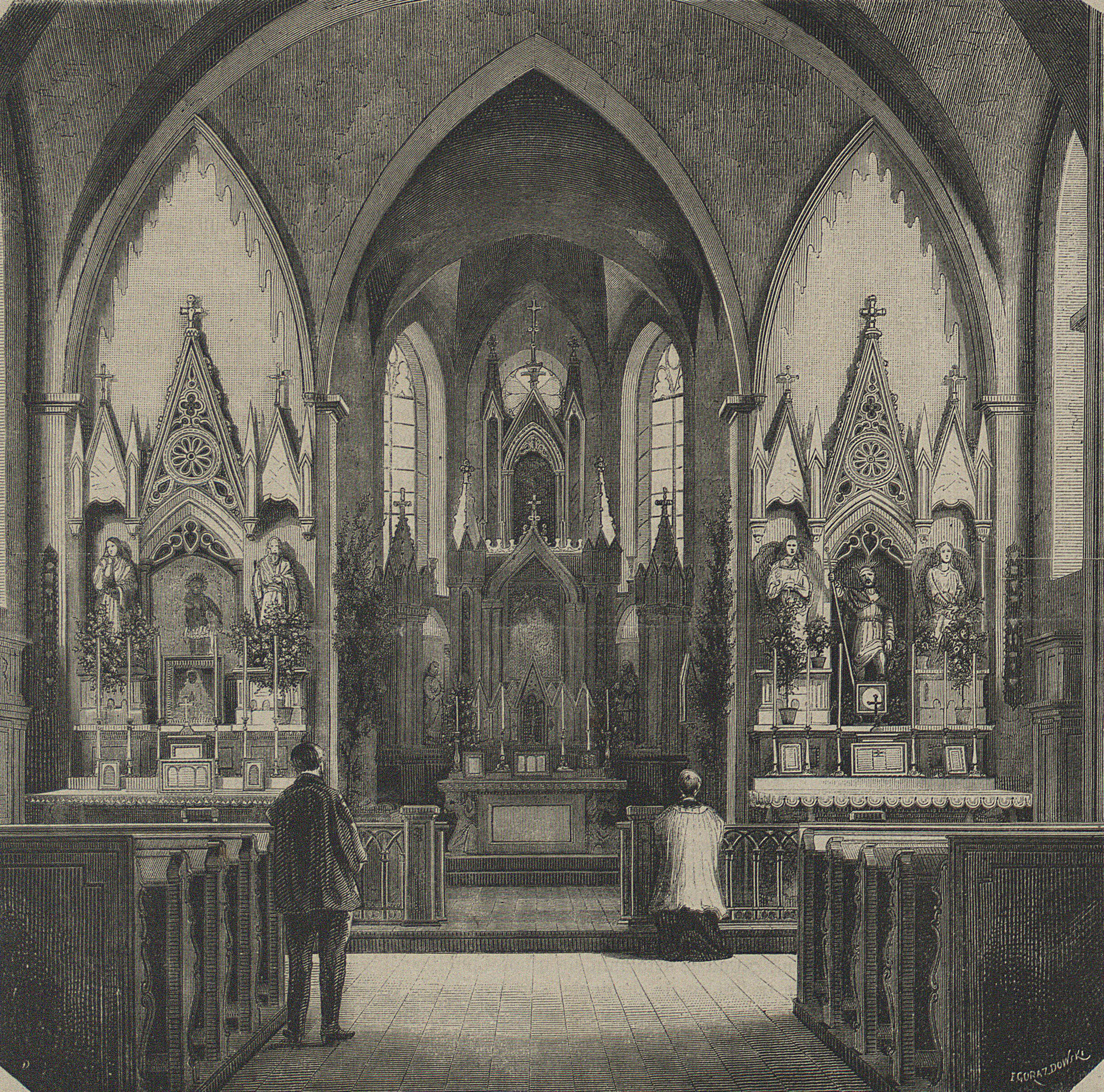

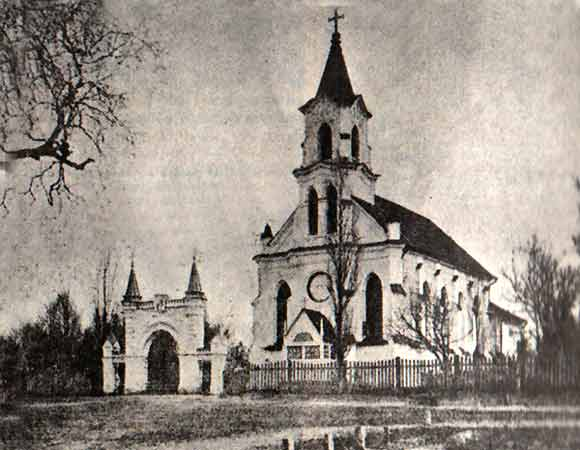

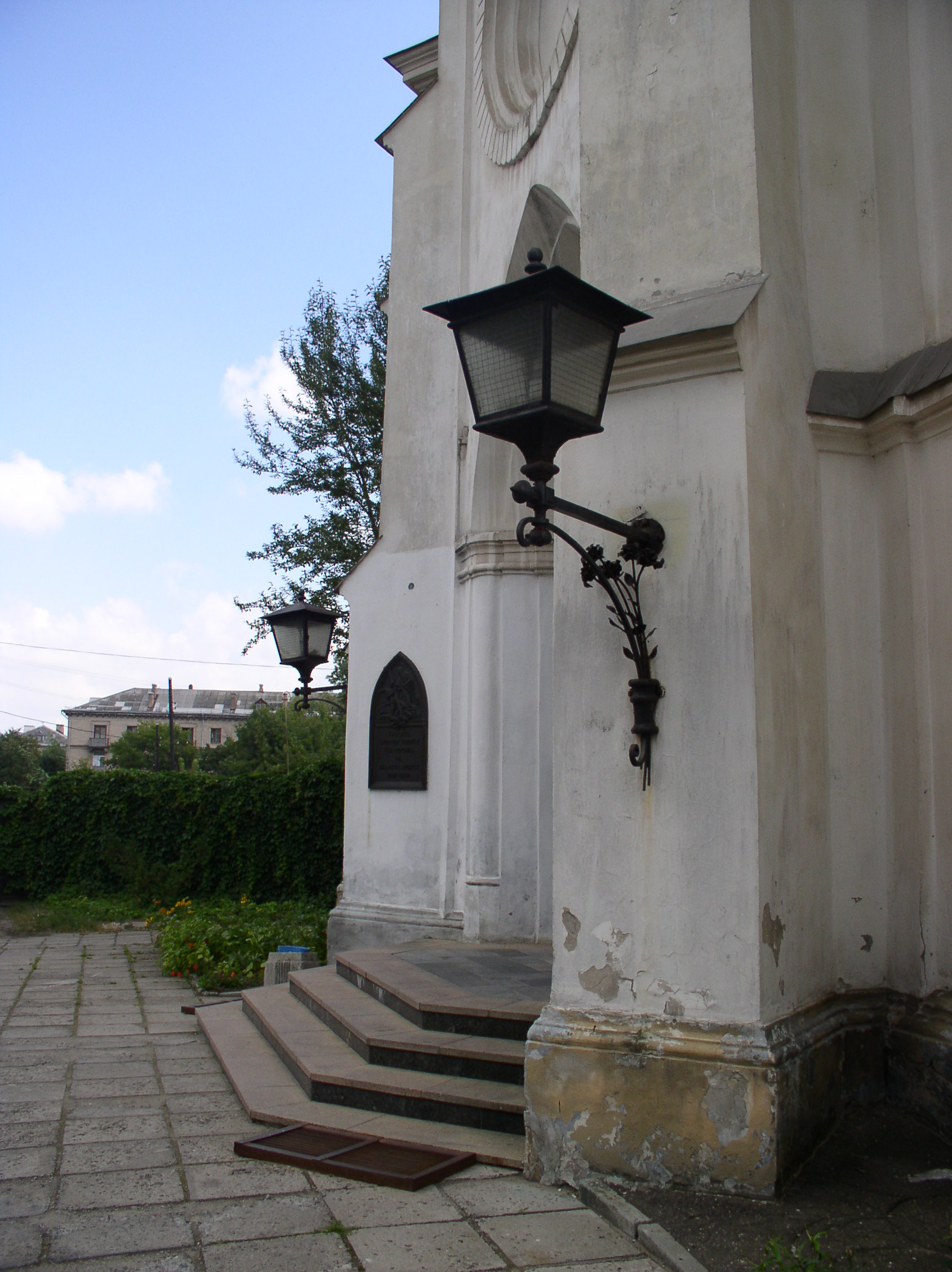

== Sources ==
- Dzyancau, U. M. (1993). Архітэктура Беларусі. Энцыклапедычны даведнік [Encyclopedia Belarusian Architecture] (in Belarusian). Minsk: Беларуская Энцыклапедыя імя Петруся Броўкі. p. 340. ISBN 5-85700-078-5.
