= Zhlobin district =

District of Gomel region, Belarus

Coordinates: 52°54′N 30°02′E

Zhlobin district Жлобінскі раён (Belarusian) Жлобинский район (Russian)
- District
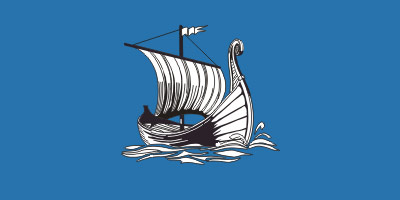
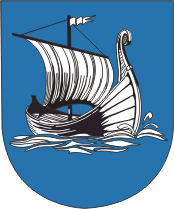
- Flag Coat of arms

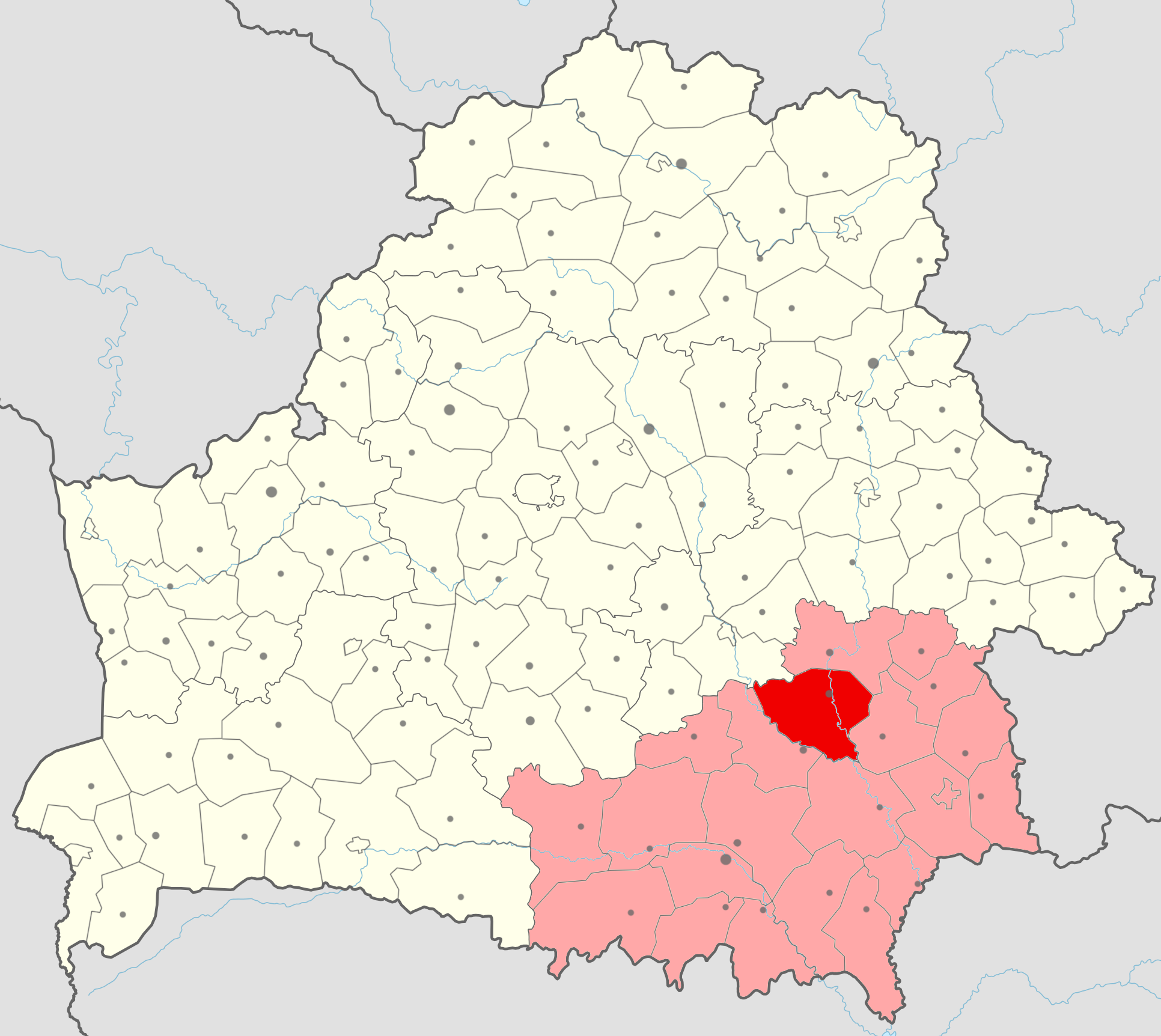
- Country: Belarus
- Region: Gomel region
- Administrative center: Zhlobin

Area
  - Total: 2,110.77 km^{2} (814.97 sq mi)

Population (2024)
  - Total: 98,071
  - Density: 46.462/km^{2} (120.34/sq mi)
- Time zone: UTC+3 (MSK)

Zhlobin district or Žlobin district (Belarusian: Жлобінскі раён, romanized: Žlobinski rajon; Russian: Жлобинский район) is a district (raion) of Gomel region in Belarus. Its administrative center is Zhlobin. As of 2024, it has a population of 98,071.

== Notable residents ==
- Uladzimir Sodal (1937, Mormal village – 2015), journalist and historian
