= Lukh, Russia =

Lukh Лух
- Work settlement
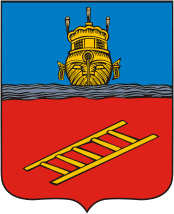
- Flag Coat of arms
- Interactive map of Lukh
- Location of Lukh Lukh (Ivanovo Oblast)
- Coordinates: 57°00′30″N 42°15′30″E
- Country: Russia
- Federal subject: Ivanovo Oblast
- Administrative district: Lukhsky District

Population (2010 Census)
  - Total: 3,024
  - Estimate (2025): 2,442 (−19.2%)

Administrative status
  - Capital of: Lukhsky District

Municipal status
  - Municipal district: Lukhsky Municipal District
  - Urban settlement: Lukhskoye Urban Settlement
  - Capital of: Lukhsky Municipal District, Lukhskoye Urban Settlement
- Time zone: UTC+3 (MSK)
- Postal code: 155270
- OKTMO ID: 24615151051

Lukh (Russian: Лух) is an urban-type settlement and the administrative center of Lukhsky District of Ivanovo Oblast, Russia, with a population of 2,572 (2021 census); 3,024 (2010 census); 3,268 (2002 census); 3,671 (1989 Soviet census). It is located on banks of the Lukh River.

== History ==
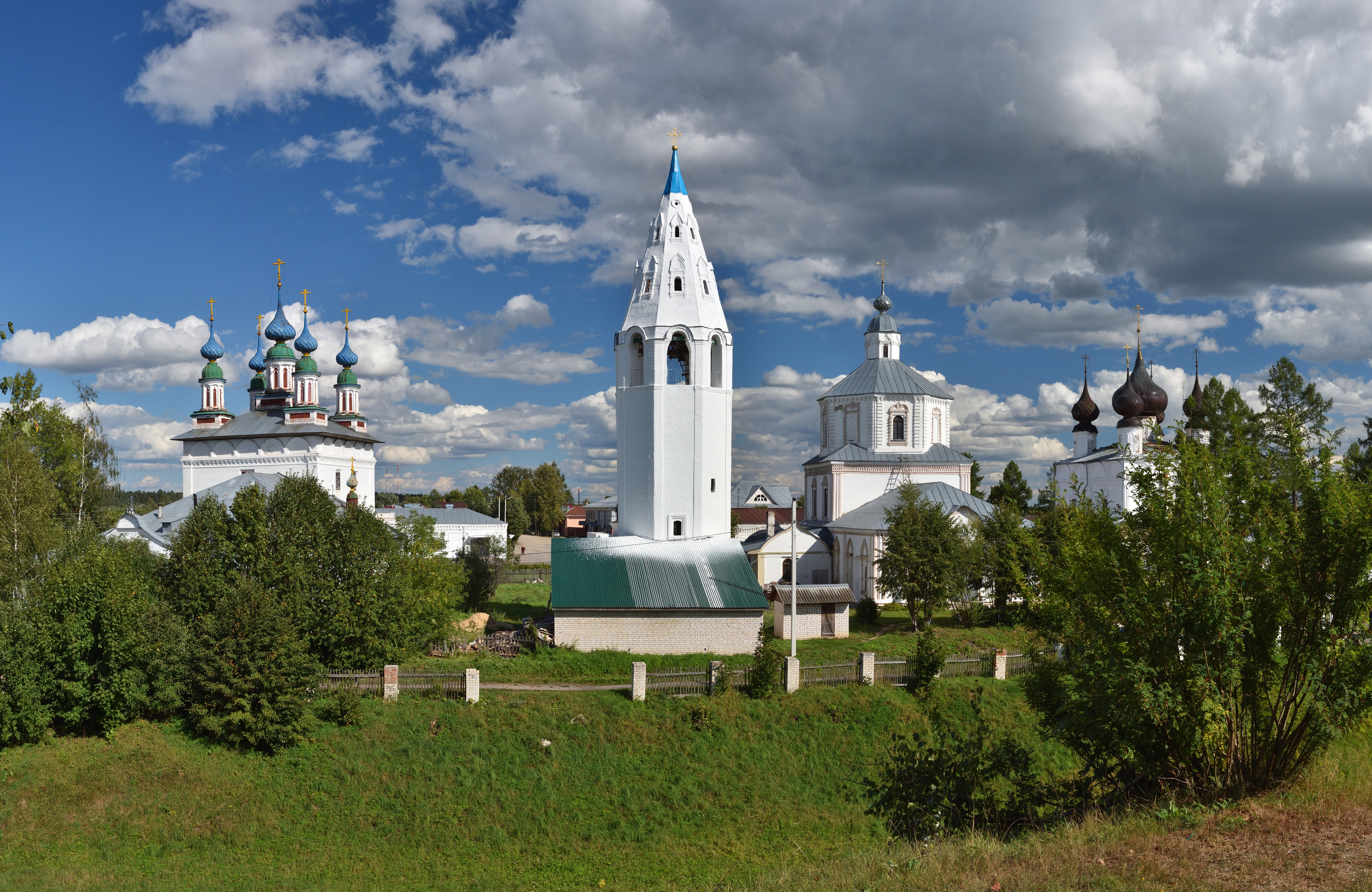
Ensemble of churches in Lukh

The foundation date of Lukh is not known, but it was a fortress in the Middle Ages and served to protect the Northeastern Rus from Tatars. The ramparts of the fortress from the 14th century have been preserved in the settlement. Lukh was first mentioned in 1342 as a village shown on a map. It belonged to Metropolitan Cyprian, and in 1498 the Lukh Principality was established and given to Prince Fyodor Belsky. Whereas subordinate to the Grand Duchy of Moscow, and then the Tsardom of Russia, the principality existed until 1584, when it was abolished and merged into the Tsardom of Russia.

During the Time of Troubles, in 1608, Lukh accepted False Dmitry II as a Tsar, and until the end of 1609 was several times conquered by the forces by Vasili Shuysky, which were subsequently driven back from the town.

In the course of the administrative reform carried out in 1708 by Peter the Great, Lukh was listed as a town in Moscow Governorate. When the governorate was divided into provinces, Lukh became a part of Yuryev-Polsky Province. In 1778, Kostroma Viceroyalty (known since 1796 as Kostroma Governorate) was established, and Lukh, which was the administrative center of Lukhsky Uyezd, became a part of it. In 1797, Lukhsky Uyezd was abolished, and Lukh became a part of Yuryevetsky Uyezd but retained the town status. In 1925, it lost the town status and downgraded into selo. The status changed followed the initiative of the citizens of Lukh, who though that the Soviet legislation of the time was unfavorable towards possible agricultural activities in towns, and it would be more advantageous to have a rural locality.

In 1918, Yuryevetsky District was transferred to newly established Ivanovo-Voznesensk Governorate. On June 10, 1929, governorates and uyezds were abolished, and Lukh became a part of Puchezhsky District of Ivanovo Industrial Oblast. It was a part of Kineshemsky Okrug. On January 25, 1935, Lukhsky District with the administrative center in Luk was established. On March 11, 1936, Ivanovo Industrial Oblast was abolished and split into Ivanovo and Yaroslavl Oblasts. In 1959, Lukh was granted urban-type settlement status.

== Economy ==
=== Industry ===
There are enterprises of food, construction, and textile industries in Lukh.

=== Transportation ===
Lukh is connected by roads with Vichuga, Puchezh, and also has access to the highway which connects Shuya and Chkalovsk via Verkhny Landekh. There is a regular bus traffic.

== Culture and recreation ==
Lukh contains six cultural heritage monuments of federal significance and additionally thirty objects classified as cultural and historical heritage of local significance. The federal monuments are the ramparts of the Lukh Fortress, as well as four churches built in the end of the 17th and in the 18th centuries: The Assumption Cathedral, the Trinity Cathedral, the Resurrection Church, and the Transfiguration Church.

There is a local museum in Lukh. It was founded in 1981 and named after Nikolay Benardos, an inventor who lived in Lukh for an extended period of time.
