= Lukhsky District =

Area of Ivanovo Oblast, Russia

Lukhsky District Лухский район (Russian)
- District
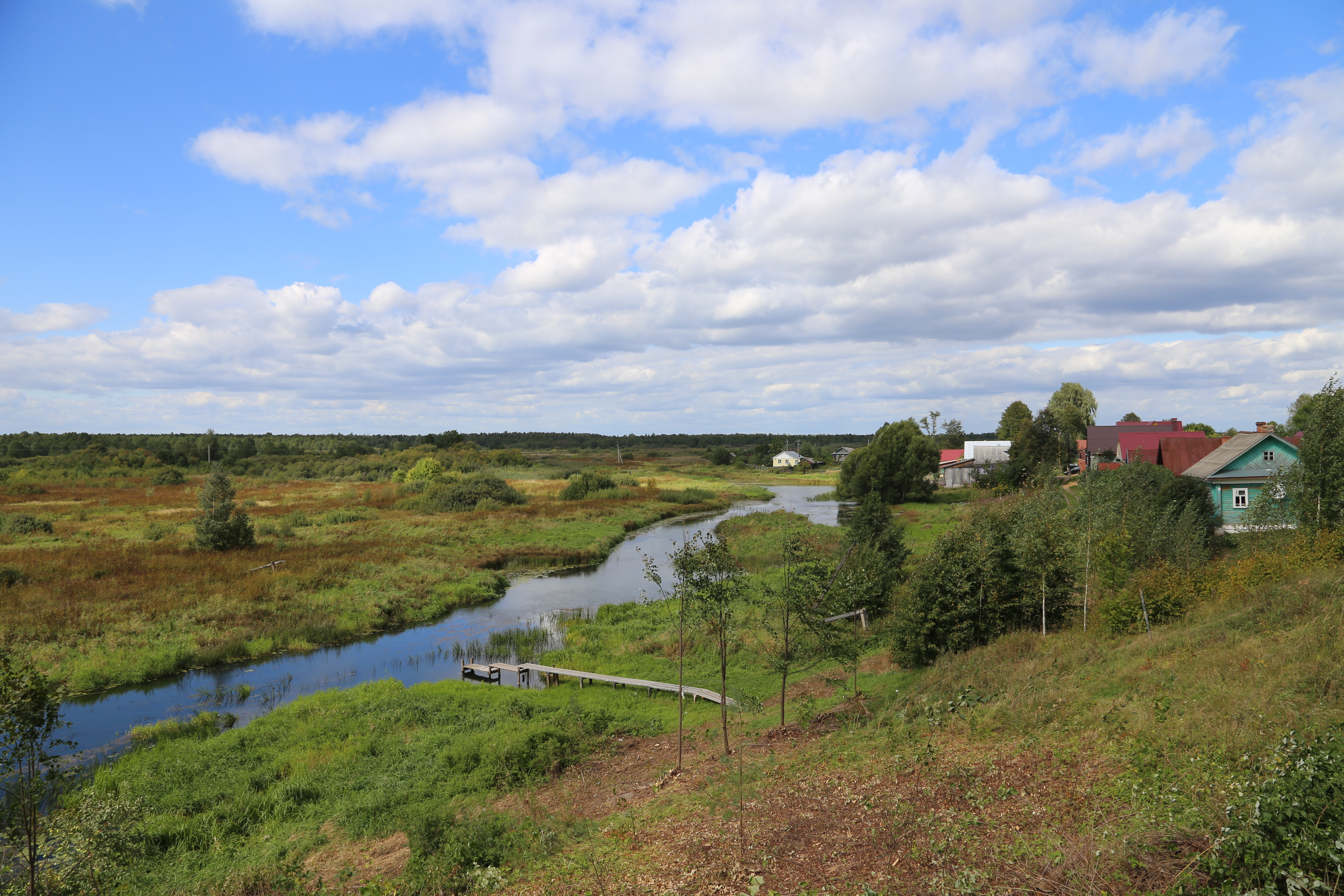
- Lukh River, Lukhsky District

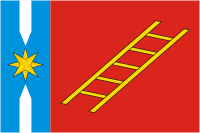
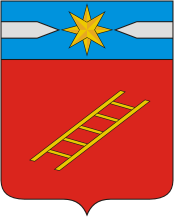
- Flag Coat of arms
- Location of Lukhsky District in Ivanovo Oblast
- Coordinates: 57°00′25″N 42°15′44″E
- Country: Russia
- Federal subject: Ivanovo Oblast
- Established: 1935
- Administrative center: Lukh

Area
  - Total: 955 km^{2} (369 sq mi)

Population (2010 Census)
  - Total: 9,273
  - Density: 9.71/km^{2} (25.1/sq mi)
  - Urban: 32.6%
  - Rural: 67.4%

Administrative structure
  - Inhabited localities: 124 rural localities

Municipal structure
  - Municipally incorporated as: Lukhsky Municipal District
  - Municipal divisions: 1 urban settlements, 4 rural settlements
- Time zone: UTC+3 (MSK)
- OKTMO ID: 24615000
- Website: http://www.luhadm.ru/

Lukhsky District (Russian: Лу́хский райо́н) is an administrative and municipal district (raion), one of the twenty-one in Ivanovo Oblast, Russia. It is located in the east of the oblast. The area of the district is 955 square kilometers (369 sq mi). Its administrative center is the urban locality (a settlement) of Lukh. Population: 7,684 (2021 census); 9,273 (2010 census); 10,014 (2002 Census); 11,067 (1989 Soviet census). The population of Lukh accounts for 33.5% of the district's total population.
