= Names of Belarusian places in other languages =

This page lists some names of places in Belarus, as they are called in two of the official languages (Belarusian, Russian) and in other languages spoken by ethnic groups which are or have been represented within Belarusian territory.

== Cities ==
=== Minsk Region ===
Belarusian (Łacinka)	Belarusian (Cyrillic)	Russian	Polish	Yiddish	Lithuanian
Barysaŭ	Барысаў	Борисов/Borisov	Borysów	באריסאב/Borisov	Barysavas
Bierazino	Беразіно	Березино/Berezino	Berezyna	בערעזין/Berezin	Berazino
Dziaržynsk (Kojdanaŭ)	Дзяржынск (Койданаў)	Дзержинск (Койдановo) /Dzerzhinsk (Kojdanovo)	Dzierżyńsk (Kojdanów)	קוידענאוו/Koidenav	Dziaržynskas (Kaidanava)
Fanipal	Фаніпаль	Фаниполь/Fanipol	Fanipal		Fanipalis
Kapyl	Капыль	Копыль/Kopyl	Kopyl	קאפולע/Kapulie	Kapylius
Kliecak	Клецк	Клецк/Kletsk	Kleck	קלעצק/Kletzk	Kleckas
Krupki	Крупкі	Крупки/ Krupki	Krupki	קרופקע/Krupke	Krupkos
Lubań	Любань	Любань/Lyuban	Lubań	לובאן/Luban	Liubanė
Marjina Horka	Мар’іна Горка	Марьина Горка/Maryina Gorka	Marina Horka		Marjina Horka
Maładečna	Маладзечна/Маладэчна	Молодечно/Molodechno	Mołodeczno	מאלאדטשנע/Molodetchne	Maladečina
Miadzieł	Мядзел	Мядель/Myadel	Miadzioł		Medilas
Minsk (Miensk)	Мінск (Менск)	Минск/Minsk	Mińsk (-Litewski)	מינסק/Minsk	Minskas
Niaśviž	Нясвіж	Несвиж/Nesvizh	Nieśwież	ניעסוויזש/Nesvizsh	Nesvyžius
Salihorsk	Салігорск	Солигорск/Soligorsk	Soligorsk	סאליגארסק/Soligorsk	Salihorskas
Smalavičy	Смалявічы	Смолевичи/Smolevichi	Smolewicze	סמולאוויטש/Smolavitch	Smaliavičai
Staryja Darohi	Старыя Дарогі	Старые Дороги/Staryie Dorogi	Stare Dorogi	סטאראיע דארוגי/Staraye Dorogi	Staryja Darohos
Stoŭpcy	Стоўбцы	Столбцы/Stolbtsy	Stołpce		Stolpcai
Słuck (Słucak)	Слуцк (Слуцак)	Слуцк/Slutsk	Słuck	סלוצק/Slutsk	Sluckas
Uzda	Узда	Узда/ Uzda	Uzda	אוזדא/Uzda	Uzda
Vałožyn	Валожын	Воложин/Volozhin	Wołożyn	וואלאזשין/Volozshin	Valažinas
Viliejka (Vialiejka)	Вілейка (Вялейка)	Вилейка/Vileyka	Wilejka	וילייקע/Vileike	Vileika
Zasłaŭje	Заслаўе	Заславль/Zaslavl	Zasław	זאסלאב/Zaslov	Zaslavlis
Červień (Ihumen)	Чэрвень (Ігумен)	Червень (Игумен) /Cherven (Igumen)	Czerwień (Ihumeń)	אייהומען/Eihumen	Červenė (Igumenas)
Łahojsk	Лагойск	Логойск/Logoysk	Łohojsk	לאהויסק/Lahoisk	Lahoiskas
Žodzina	Жодзіна	Жодино/Zhodino	Żodzino		Žodzina

=== Brest Region ===
Belarusian (Łacinka)	Belarusian (Cyrillic)	Russian	Polish	Yiddish	Lithuanian
Baranavičy	Баранавічы	Барановичи/Baranovichi	Baranowicze	באראנאוויטש/Baranovitch	Baranovičiai
Byaroza	Бяроза (-Карту́ская)	Берёза/Beryoza	Bereza (-Kartuska)	קארטוז-ברעזא /Kartoz-Breza	Berioza (-Kartuskaja)
Biełaaziorsk	Белаазёрск	Белоозёрск/Beloozyorsk	Biełooziersk		Belaaziorskas
Brest (Bieraście)	Брэст (Берасьце)	Брест (-Литовск) /Brest(-Litovsk)	Brześć (-Litewski, -nad Bugiem)	בּריסק/Brisk	Brestas (Lietuvos Brasta)
Davyd-Haradok	Давыд-Гарадок	Давид-Городок /David-Gorodok	Dawidgródek	דויד הורודוק/ David Horodok	Davyd Haradokas
Drahičyn	Драгічын	Дрогичин/Drogichin	Drohiczyn (-Poleski)	דראהיטשין/Drohitchin	Dragičynas
Hancavičy	Ганцавічы	Ганцевичи/Gantsevichi	Hancewicze		Hancavičiai
Ivacevičy	Івацэвічы	Ивацевичи/Ivatsevichi	Iwacewicze	איוואצוויטש/Ivatzvich	Ivacevičiai
Ivanava (Janaŭ)	Іванава (Я́наў)	Иваново (Янов) /Ivanovo (Yanov)	Janów (-Poleski)	יאנוב פאלעסקי /Yanov Poleski	Ivanava
Kamianiec	Камянец	Каменец (-Литовский) /Kamenets (-Litovskiy)	Kamieniec (-Litewski)	קאמענעץ ליטווסק/Kamenetz Litovsk	Kamenecas
Kobryń	Кобрын(ь)	Кобрин/Kobrin	Kobryń	קאברין/Kobrin	Kobrynė
Kosava (-Paleskaje)	Косава	Коссово/Kossovo	Kosów Poleski	קאסאוו/Kosov	Kosava
Liachavičy	Ляхавічы	Ляховичи/Lyakhovichi	Lachowicze		Liachavičiai
Małaryta	Маларыта	Малорита/Malorita	Małoryta	מאלוריטה/Malorita	Malaryta
Mikaševičy	Мікашэвічы	Микашевичи/Mikashevichy	Mikaszewicze	מיקשעוויץ/Mikshevitz	Mikaševičiai
Pinsk	Пінск	Пинск/Pinsk	Pińsk	פינסק/Pinsk	Pinskas
Pružany	Пружаны	Пружаны/Pruzhany	Prużana	פרוזשענע/Pruzhani	Pružanai
Stolin	Столін	Столин/Stolin	Stolin	סטולין/Stolin	Stolinas
Vysokaye	Высокае	Высокое(Высоко-Литовск) /Vysokoye (Vysoko-Litovsk)	Wysokie (-Litewskie)	װיסאָקא־-ליטאװסק /Visoka Litovsk	Aukštieji Lietuviai
Łuniniec	Лунінец	Лунинец/Luninets	Łuniniec	לונינייץ/Luninitz	Luninecas
Žabinka	Жабінка	Жабинка/ Zhabinka	Żabinka	זשאבינקא/Zshabinka	Žabinka

=== Homiel Region ===
Belarusian (Łacinka)	Belarusian (Cyrillic)	Russian	Polish	Yiddish	Lithuanian
Brahin	Брагін	Брагин/Bragin	Brahiń	בראָגין/Brogin	Brahinas
Buda-Kašaliova	Буда-Кашалёва	Буда-Кошелёво/Buda-Koshelevo	Buda Koszelewska		Buda Kašaliova
Chojniki	Хойнікі	Хойники/Khoyniki	Chojniki		Choinikai
Dobruš	Добруш	Добруш/Dobrush	Dobrusz	דאָברוש/Dobrush	Dobrušas
Homiel	Гомель	Гомель/Gomel	Homel	האָמל/Homl	Gomelis
Jelsk (Karolin)	Ельск (Каролін)	Ельск (Королин) /Yelsk (Korolin)	Jelsk (Karolin)		Jelskas
Kalinkavičy	Калінкавічы	Калинковичи/Kalinkovichi	Kalinkowicze	קאלינקאָוויטש/Kalinkovitch	Kalinkavičai
Mazyr	Мазыр	Мозырь/Mozyr	Mozyrz	מאָזיר/Mozir	Mozyrius
Naroŭla	Нароўля	Наровля/Narovlya	Narowla	נאראָוולא/Narovla	Naroulia
Pietrykaŭ	Петрыкаў	Петриков/Petrikov	Pietrzyków	פעטריקאָוו/Petrikov	Petrykavas
Rahačoŭ	Рагачоў	Рогачёв/ Rogachyov	Rohaczów	ראָגאטשעוו/Rogatshev	Rahačovas
Rečyca	Рэчыца	Речица/Rechitsa	Rzeczyca	רעטשיטסא/Retshitsa	Rečyca
Turaŭ	Тураў	Туров/Turov	Turów	טורעוו/Turev	Turovas
Vasilievičy	Васілевічы	Василевичи/Vasilevichi	Wasilewicze	וואסילעוויטש/Vasilevitch	Vasilevičai
Vietka	Ветка	Ветка/Vetka	Wietka	ויאטקא/Viatka	Vetka
Čačersk	Чачэрск	Чечерск/Chechersk	Czeczersk	טשעטשערסק/Tshetshersk	Čačerskas
Śvietłahorsk (Šacilki)	Светлагорск (Шацілкі)	Светлогорск (Шатилки) /Svetlogorsk (Shatilki)	Swietłahorsk (Szaciłki)		Svietlahorskas
Žytkavičy	Жыткавічы	Житковичи/Zhitkovichi	Żytkowicze	זשיטקאָוויטש/Zshitkovitch	Žytkavičai
Žłobin	Жлобін	Жлобин/Zhlobin	Żłobin	זשלאָבין/Zshlobin	Žlobinas

=== Hrodna Region ===
Belarusian (Łacinka)	Belarusian (Cyrillic)	Russian	Polish	Yiddish	Lithuanian
Astraviec	Астравец	Острове́ц/Ostrovets	Ostrowiec	אוסטרווייץ/Ostrovietz	Astravas
Ašmiany	Ашмяны	Ошмяны/Oshmyany	Oszmiana	אָשמענע/Oshmene	Ašmena
Bjarozaŭka	Бярозаўка	Берёзовка/Beryozovka	Brzozówka		Biariozauka
Dziatłava (Zdziecieł)	Дзятлава (Зьдзецел)	Дятлово/Dyatlovo	Zdzięcioł	זשעטל/Zhetl	Zietela
Hrodna (Horadnia)	Гродна (Го́радня)	Гродно /Grodno	Grodno	גראָדנע/Grodne	Gardinas
Iŭje	Іўе	Ивье/Ivye	Iwie	אייוויע/Ivie	Vija (Yvija)
Lida	Ліда	Лида/Lida	Lida	לידע/Lide	Lyda
Masty	Масты	Мосты/Mosty	Mosty	מאסט/Most	Mastai
Navahrudak (Navahradak)	Навагрудак /Наваградак	Новогрудок/Novogrudok	Nowogródek	נאַוואַרעדאָק/Navaredak	Naugardukas (Naugardas)
Skidziel (Skidal)	Скідзель (Скідаль)	Скидель/Skidel	Skidel	סקידעל/Skidel	Skidlius
Smarhoń	Смаргонь	Сморгонь/Smorgon	Smorgonie	סמורגון /Smorgon	Smurgainys
Słonim	Слонім	Слоним/Slonim	Słonim	סלונים/Slonim	Slanimas
Vaŭkavysk	Ваўкавыск	Волковыск/Volkovysk	Wołkowysk	וואלקאוויסק/Volkavisk	Valkaviskas
Śvisłač	Свіслач	Свислочь/Svisloch	Świsłocz	סיסלעוויטש/Sislevitch	Svisločius
Ščučyn	Шчучын	Щучин/Shchuchin	Szczuczyn (-Litewski)	שטוטשין/Shtutshin	Ščiutinas

=== Mahiloŭ Region ===
Belarusian (Łacinka)	Belarusian (Cyrillic)	Russian	Polish	Yiddish	Lithuanian
Asipovičy	Асіповічы	Осиповичи/Osipovichi	Osipowicze	אָסיפוביטש/Osipovitch	Asipovičai
Babrujsk	Бабруйск	Бобруйск/Bobruysk	Bobrujsk	באברויסק/Bobroisk	Babruiskas
Bychaŭ	Быхаў	Быхов/Bykhov	Bychów	ביחאָוו/Bihov	Bychavas
Horki	Горкі	Горки/Gorki	Horki	האָרקי/Horki	Horkos
Kaściukovičy	Касцюковічы	Костюковичи/Kostyukovichi	Kościukowicze	קאָסטיוקאָוויטש/Kostiukovitch	Kasciukovičai
Kiraŭsk (Kačeryčy)	Кіраўск (Качэрычы)	Кировск/Kirovsk	Kirowsk (Kaczerycze)		Kirauskas
Klimavičy	Клімавічы	Климовичи/Klimovichi	Klimowicze	קלימאָוויטש/Klimovitch	Klimavičai
Kličaŭ	Клічаў	Кличев/Klichev	Kliczów		Kličavas
Kryčaŭ	Крычаў	Кричев/Krichev	Krzyczew		Kryčavas
Mahilioŭ	Магілёў	Могилёв/Mogilev	Mohylew	מאָהלעוו/Mohlev	Mogiliavas
Mścisłaŭ (Amścisłaŭ)	Мсціслаў (Амсьціслаў)	Мстиславль/Mstislavl	Mścisław	אָמטשיסלאוו/Omtchislav	Mscislavas
Słaŭharad (Prapojsk)	Слаўгарад (Прапойск)	Славгород (Пропойск) /Slavgorod (Propoysk)	Sławograd (Propojsk)	פראָפאָיסק/Propoisk	Slauharadas (Prapoiskas)
Čavusy	Чавусы	Чаусы/ Chausy	Czausy	טשאָסס/Tshoss	Čavusai
Čerykaŭ	Чэрыкаў	Чериков/Cherikov	Czeryków	טשעריקאָוו/Tcherikov	Čerykavas
Škłoŭ	Шклоў	Шклов/Shklov	Szkłów	שקלאָוו/Shklov	Šklovas

=== Viciebsk Region ===
Belarusian (Łacinka)	Belarusian (Cyrillic)	Russian	Polish	Yiddish	Lithuanian
Barań	Барань	Барань/Baran	Barań	באראן/Baran	Baranis
Brasłaŭ	Браслаў	Браслав/Braslav	Brasław	ברעסלעב/Breslev	Breslauja
Dokšycy	Докшыцы	Докшицы/Dokshitsy	Dokszyce	דאָקשיטס/Dokshits	Dokšica
Dubroŭna	Дуброўна	Дубровно/Dubrovno	Dubrowna	דובראָוונאָ/Dubrovno	Dubrouna
Dzisna	Дзісна	Дисна/Disna	Dzisna	דיסנע/Disne	Dysna
Haradok	Гарадок	Городок/Gorodok	Horodek	האָראָדאָק/Horodok	Haradokas
Hłybokaje	Глыбокае	Глубокое/Glubokoye	Głębokie	גלובאָק/Glubok	Glubokas
Lepiel	Лепель	Лепель/Lepel	Lepel	לעפעל/Lepel	Lepelis
Miory	Міёры (Мёры)	Миоры/Miory	Miory	מיור/Mior	Miorai
Navapołack (Navapołacak)	Наваполацк (Наваполацак)	Новополоцк/Novopolotsk	Nowopołock		Navapolackas
Novałukomĺ (Novałukomaĺ)	Новалукомль (Новалукомаль)	Новолукомль/Novolukoml	Nowołukoml		Novalukomlis
Orša (Vorša)	Орша (Ворша)	Орша/Orsha	Orsza	אורשא/Orsha	Orša
Pastavy	Паставы	Поставы/Postavy	Postawy	פאָסטאָוו/Postov	Pastovys
Połack (Połacak)	Полацк (Полацак)	Полоцк/Polotsk	Połock	פאָלאָטסק/Polotsk	Polockas
Sianno	Сянно	Сенно/Senno	Sienno	סענא/Sena	Siano
Tałačyn	Талачын	Толочин/Tolochin	Tołoczyn	טאָלאָטשין/Tolotshin	Talačynas
Viciebsk	Віцебск	Витебск/Vitebsk	Witebsk	ויטעבסק/Vitebsk	Vitebskas
Vierchniadzvinsk (Drysa)	Верхнядзвінск (Дрыса)	Верхнедвинск (Дрисса) /Verkhnedvinsk (Drissa)	Wierchniedźwińsk (Dryssa)	דריסא/Drisa	Verchniadzvinskas (Drisa)
Čašniki	Чашнікі	Чашники/Chashniki	Czaśniki	טשאשניק/Tshashnik	Čašnikai

== See also ==
- History of Belarus
- Jews in Belarus
- Polish minority in Belarus
