= List of cities and towns in Belarus =

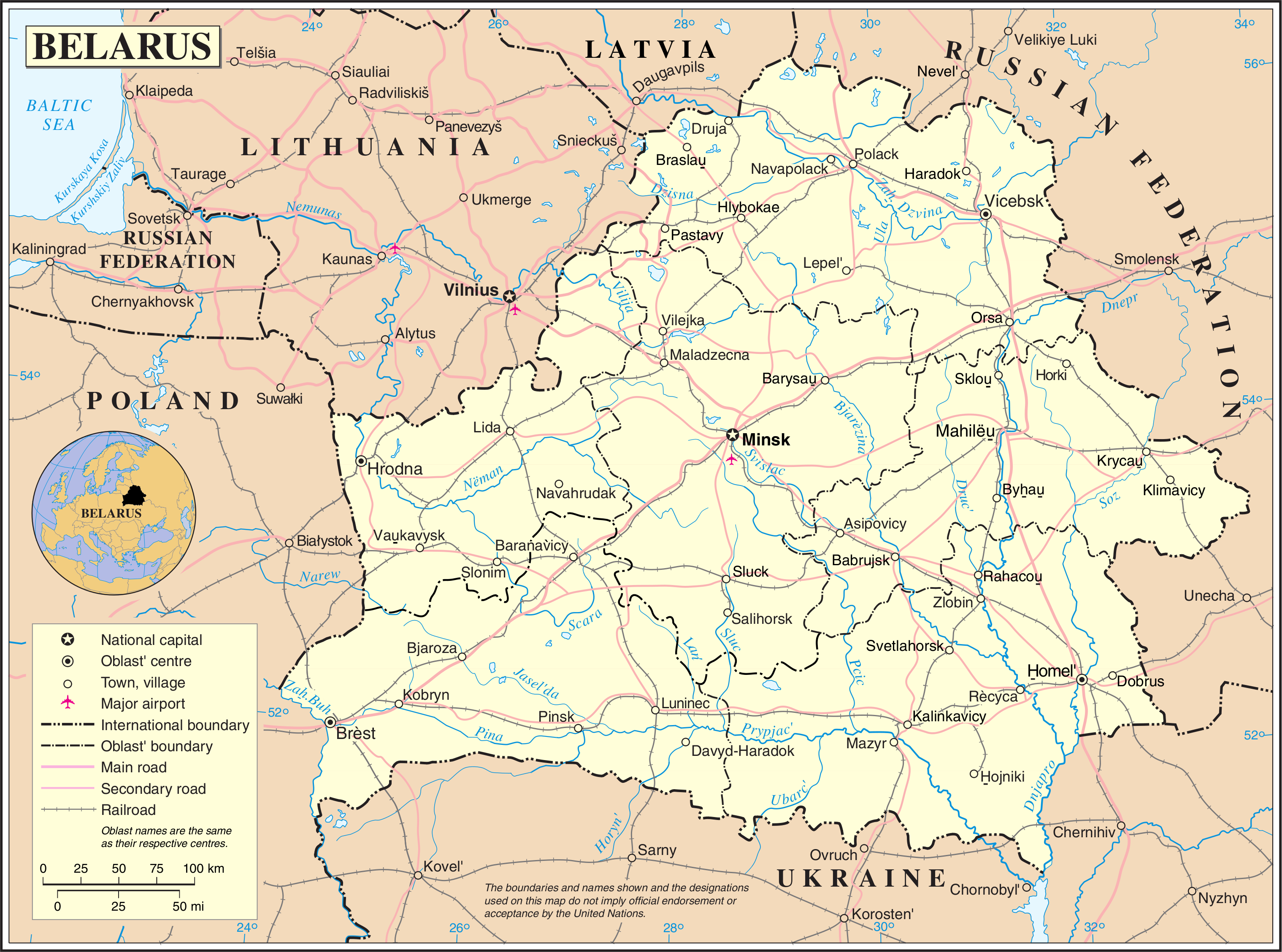
Map of the Republic of Belarus

This is a list of cities and towns in Belarus. Neither the Belarusian nor the Russian language makes a distinction between "city" and "town" as English does; the word horad (Belarusian: горад [ˈɣorat]) or gorod (Russian: город [ˈɡorət]) is used for both.

== Overview ==
Belarusian legislation uses a three-level hierarchy of town classifications.

According to the Law under May 5, 1998, the categories of the most developed urban localities in Belarus are as follows:

- capital — Minsk;
- city of regional subordinance (Belarusian: горад абласнога падпарадкавання; Russian: город областного подчинения) — urban locality with a population of not less than 50,000 people; it has its own body of self-government, known as Council of Deputies (Belarusian: Савет дэпутатаў; Russian: совет депутатов) and an executive committee (Belarusian: выканаўчы камітэт; Russian: исполнительный комитет), which stand on the level with these of a raion (Belarusian: раён).
- city of district subordinance (Belarusian: горад раённага падпарадкавання; Russian: город районного подчинения) — urban locality with a population of more than 6,000 people; it may have its own body of self-government (Belarusian: Савет дэпутатаў; Russian: совет депутатов) and an executive committee (Belarusian: выканаўчы камітэт; Russian: исполнительный комитет), which belong to the same level as these of rural councils and of s.c. haradski pasiolak (Belarusian: гарадскі пасёлак; Russian: городской посёлок) (a type of a smaller urban locality).

This division was inherited by the contemporary Republic of Belarus from the Byelorussian SSR and introduced in 1938.

As of 2020, 115 settlements had the status of a city/town. Among them:

- 10 cities of regional subordinance;
- 104 towns of district subordinance;
- Minsk — the capital of the country.

== List ==
Rank	Belarusian (BGN/PCGN)	Russian (BGN/PCGN)	Status	Obtaining	Foundation	Population (2025 estimate)	Population (2019 census)	Population (2009 census)	2019—2009 change
(Minsk Region) Minsk region
1	Minsk (Мінск)	Minsk (Минск)	Capital	September, 27 1938	1067	1,994,796	2,018,281	1,836,808	+9.88%
2	Barysaw (Барысаў)	Borisov (Борисов)	Raion	September, 27 1938	1102	134,732	141,061	147,381	−4.29%
3	Salihorsk (Салігорск, Saligorsk)	Soligorsk (Солигорск)	Raion	March, 7 1963	1959	96,993	101,564	102,297	−0.72%
4	Maladzyechna (Маладзечна, Maladziechna)	Molodechno (Молодечно)	Raion	September, 20 1944	1388	88,290	91,754	94,282	−2.68%
5	Zhodzina (Жодзіна)	Zhodino (Жодино)	Oblast	March, 7 1963	1643	63,354	64,841	61,724	+5.05%
6	Slutsk (Слуцк, Sluck)	Slutsk (Слуцк)	Raion	September, 27 1938	1116	59,450	61,708	61,444	+0.43%
7	Vilyeyka (Вілейка, Viliejka)	Vileyka (Вилейка)	Raion	January, 15 1940	1460	26,375	27,296	26,836	+1.71%
8	Dzyarzhynsk (Дзяржынск, Dziarzhynsk)	Dzerzhinsk (Дзержинск)	Raion	September, 27 1938	1146	29,630	29,170	25,164	+15.92%
9	Maryina Horka (Мар'іна Горка, Marjina Gorka)	Mar’ina Gorka (Марьина Горка)	Raion	July, 22 1955	1222	19,994	20,742	21,446	−3.28%
10	Stowbtsy (Стоўбцы, Stowbcy)	Stolbtsy (Столбцы)	Raion	January, 15 1940	1593	17,701	17,233	15,367	+12.14%
11	Smalyavichy (Смалявічы, Smaliavichy)	Smolevichi (Смолевичи)	Raion	March, 7 1968	1448	23,721	19,165	15,092	+26.99%
12	Zaslawye (Заслаўе, Zaslawje)	Zaslavl (Заславль)	Raion	August, 14 1985	985	17,317	17,685	14,202	+24.52%
13	Nyasvizh (Нясвіж, Niasvizh)	Nesvizh (Несвиж)	Raion	January, 15 1940	1223	15,909	15,566	14,033	+10.92%
14	Fanipal (Фаніпаль)	Fanipol (Фаниполь)	Raion	March, 10 1999	1856	18,684	17,099	12,718	+34.45%
15	Byerazino (Беразіно, Bierazino)	Berezino (Березино)	Raion	March, 7 1968	1501	11,250	11,392	12,020	−5.22%
16	Lyuban (Любань, Liuban)	Lyuban (Любань)	Raion	March, 7 1968	1566	11,278	11,693	11,256	+3.88%
17	Lahoysk (Лагойск, Lagojsk)	Logoysk (Логойск)	Raion	May, 28 1998	1078	15,567	15,121	10,706	+41.24%
18	Staryya Darohi (Старыя Дарогі, Staryja Darogi)	Staryye Dorogi (Старые Дороги)	Raion	September, 27 1938	1524	10,747	11,252	11,036	+1.96%
19	Klyetsk (Клецк, Klieck)	Kletsk (Клецк)	Raion	January, 15 1940	1127	11,169	11,363	10,761	+5.59%
20	Valozhyn (Валожын, Valozhyn)	Volozhin (Воложин)	Raion	January, 15 1940	1542	9,923	10,069	10,558	−4.63%
21	Chervyen (Чэрвень, Chervien)	Cherven (Червень)	Raion	September, 27 1938	1387	10,595	10,680	10,150	+5.22%
22	Kapyl (Капыль)	Kopyl (Копыль)	Raion	April, 29 1984	1274	9,887	10,425	9,938	+4.90%
23	Uzda (Узда)	Uzda (Узда)	Raion	March, 10 1999	1450	10,545	10,691	9,684	+10.40%
24	Krupki (Крупкі)	Krupki (Крупки)	Raion	May, 7 1991	1575	8,393	8,444	8,675	−2.66%
25	Myadzyel (Мядзел, Miadziel)	Myadel (Мядель)	Raion	November, 18 1998	1324	6,887	7,155	7,065	+1.27%
(Vitebsk Region) Vitsyebsk (Vitebsk) region
1	Vitsyebsk (Віцебск, Viciebsk)	Vitebsk (Витебск)	Oblast	September, 27 1938	974	358,927	364,674	347,928	+4.81%
2	Orsha (Орша)	Orsha (Орша)	Oblast	September, 27 1938	1067	101,662	107,930	117,225	−7.93%
3	Navapolatsk (Наваполацк, Navapolack)	Novopolotsk (Новополоцк)	Oblast	December, 14 1963	1958	95,370	98,926	98,138	+0.80%
4	Polatsk (Полацк, Polack)	Polotsk (Полоцк)	Oblast	September, 27 1938	862	79,285	81,219	82,547	−1.61%
5	Pastavy (Паставы, Pastavy)	Postavy (Поставы)	Raion	January, 15 1940	1409	18,450	19,255	19,815	−2.83%
6	Hlybokaye (Глыбокае, Glybokaje)	Glubokoye (Глубокое)	Raion	January, 15 1940	1414	17,807	17,680	18,082	−2.22%
7	Lyepyel (Лепель, Liepiel)	Lepel (Лепель)	Raion	September, 27 1938	1439	16,895	17,517	17,280	+1.37%
8	Novalukoml (Новалукомль)	Novolukoml (Новолукомль)	Raion	July, 31 1970	1964	11,598	12,635	13,945	−9.39%
9	Haradok (Гарадок, Garadok)	Gorodok (Городок)	Raion	September, 27 1938	1128	11,321	11,766	12,968	−9.27%
10	Baran (Барань)	Baran (Барань)	Raion	May, 17 1972	1598	10,131	10,721	11,662	−8.07%
11	Talachyn (Талачын)	Tolochin (Толочин)	Raion	July, 22 1955	1433	9,542	9,977	10,155	−1.75%
12	Braslaw (Браслаў)	Braslav (Браслав)	Raion	January, 15 1940	1065	9,338	9,400	9,516	−1.22%
13	Chashniki (Чашнікі)	Chashniki (Чашники)	Raion	August, 31 1962	1504	7,573	8,217	9,203	−10.71%
14	Myory (Мёры, Miory)	Miory (Миоры)	Raion	January, 7 1972	1514	7,756	7,803	8,188	−4.70%
15	Syanno (Сянно, Sianno)	Senno (Сенно)	Raion	September, 27 1938	1442	6,974	7,476	8,007	−6.63%
16	Dubrowna (Дуброўна)	Dubrovno (Дубровно)	Raion	September, 27 1938	1773	6,945	7,115	8,041	−11.52%
17	Vyerkhnyadzvinsk (Верхнядзвінск, Vierhniadzvinsk)	Verkhnedvinsk (Верхнедвинск)	Raion	September, 27 1938	1386	6,771	7,040	7,360	−4.35%
18	Dokshytsy (Докшыцы, Dokshycy)	Dokshitsy (Докшицы)	Raion	January, 15 1940	1407	6,601	6,868	6,628	+3.62%
19	Dzisna (Дзісна)	Disna (Дисна)	Raion	January, 15 1940	1462	1,368	1,539	1,973	−22.00%
(Mogilev Region) Mahilyow (Mogilev) region
1	Mahilyow (Магілёў, Magiliow)	Mogilyov (Могилёв)	Oblast	September, 27 1938	1267	352,896	356,821	358,279	−0.41%
2	Babruysk (Бабруйск, Babrujsk)	Bobruysk (Бобруйск)	Oblast	September, 27 1938	1387	205,502	212,283	215,092	−1.31%
3	Horki (Горкі, Gorki)	Gorki (Горки)	Raion	September, 27 1938	1544	28,626	30,371	32,777	−7.34%
4	Asipovichy (Асіповічы)	Osipovichi (Осиповичи)	Raion	September, 27 1938	1872	28,745	30,049	32,543	−7.66%
5	Krychaw (Крычаў)	Krichev (Кричев)	Raion	September, 27 1938	1136	22,973	24,494	27,202	−9.96%
6	Klimavichy (Клімавічы)	Klimovichi (Климовичи)	Raion	September, 27 1938	1581	14,868	15,527	17,064	−9.01%
7	Bykhaw (Быхаў, Byhaw)	Bykhov (Быхов)	Raion	September, 27 1938	1430	16,296	17,128	17,031	+0.57%
8	Shklow (Шклоў)	Shklov (Шклов)	Raion	September, 27 1938	1535	14,738	15,415	16,439	−6.23%
9	Kastsyukovichy (Касцюковічы, Kasciukovichy)	Kostyukovichi (Костюковичи)	Raion	September, 27 1938	1508	14,757	15,617	15,993	−2.35%
10	Mstsislaw (Мсціслаў, Mscislaw)	Mstislavl’ (Мстиславль)	Raion	September, 27 1938	1135	9,951	10,225	10,804	−5.36%
11	Chavusy (Чавусы)	Chausy (Чаусы)	Raion	September, 27 1938	1581	9,690	10,360	10,692	−3.11%
12	Byalynichy (Бялынічы, Bialynichy)	Belynichi (Белыничи)	Raion	January 17, 2017	1577	9,553	10,093	10,688	−5.57%
13	Kirawsk (Кіраўск)	Kirovsk (Кировск)	Raion	June, 4 2001	1620	7,806	8,233	8,756	−5.97%
14	Cherykaw (Чэрыкаў)	Cherikov (Чериков)	Raion	September, 27 1938	1604	7,710	7,984	8,177	−2.36%
15	Slawharad (Слаўгарад, Slawgarad)	Slavgorod (Славгород)	Raion	May, 23 1945	1136	7,647	7,864	7,992	−1.60%
16	Kruhlaye (Круглае, Kruglaje)	Krugloye (Круглое)	Raion	January 17, 2017	1524	7,031	7,579	7,529	+0.66%
17	Klichaw (Клічаў)	Klichev (Кличев)	Raion	September, 11 2000	1592	7,249	7,188	7,521	−4.43%
(Gomel Region) Homyel (Gomel) region
1	Homyel (Гомель, Gomiel)	Gomel (Гомель)	Oblast	September, 27 1938	1142	501,193	510,459	482,652	+5.76%
2	Mazyr (Мазыр)	Mozyr (Мозырь)	Raion	September, 27 1938	1155	104,517	105,527	108,792	−3.00%
3	Zhlobin (Жлобін)	Zhlobin (Жлобин)	Raion	September, 27 1938	1654	76,304	77,636	75,866	+2.33%
4	Svyetlahorsk (Светлагорск, Svietlagorsk)	Svetlogorsk (Светлогорск)	Raion	June, 29 1961	1560	61,812	65,739	69,995	−6.08%
5	Rechytsa (Рэчыца, Rechyca)	Rechitsa (Речица)	Raion	September, 27 1938	1213	64,733	66,378	64,731	+2.54%
6	Kalinkavichy (Калінкавічы)	Kalinkovichi (Калинковичи)	Raion	September, 27 1938	1560	36,656	37,647	38,381	−1.91%
7	Rahachow (Рагачоў, Ragachow)	Rogachyov (Рогачёв)	Raion	September, 27 1938	1142	31,490	33,044	33,702	−1.95%
8	Dobrush (Добруш)	Dobrush (Добруш)	Raion	September, 27 1938	1335	17,901	18,311	18,330	−0.10%
9	Zhytkavichy (Жыткавічы)	Zhinkovichi (Житковичи)	Raion	November, 19 1971	1500	15,788	15,980	15,893	+0.55%
10	Khoyniki (Хойнікі, Hojniki)	Khoyniki (Хойники)	Raion	November, 10 1967	1512	13,001	13,353	13,844	−3.55%
11	Pyetrykaw (Петрыкаў, Pietrykaw)	Petrikov (Петриков)	Raion	September, 27 1938	1523	10,278	10,025	10,591	−5.34%
12	Yelsk (Ельск, Jelsk)	Yelsk (Ельск)	Raion	July, 5 1971	1569	8,623	9,160	9,725	−5.81%
13	Buda-Kashalyova (Буда-Кашалёва, Buda-Kashaliova)	Buda-Koshelyovo (Буда-Кошелёво)	Raion	December, 31 1971	1824	8,534	8,860	9,016	−1.73%
14	Narowlya (Нароўля, Narowlia)	Narovlya (Наровля)	Raion	November, 3 1971	1406	8,388	8,247	8,110	+1.69%
15	Chachersk (Чачэрск)	Chechersk (Чечерск)	Raion	November, 3 1971	1159	8,926	8,689	7,991	+8.73%
16	Vyetka (Ветка, Vietka)	Vetka (Ветка)	Raion	September, 27 1938	1685	8,580	8,359	7,927	+5.45%
17	Vasilyevichy (Васілевічы, Vasilievichy)	Vasilevichi (Василевичи)	Raion	November, 19 1971	1466	3,143	3,513	3,923	−10.45%
18	Turaw (Тураў)	Turov (Туров)	Raion	August, 3 2004	980	2,761	2,791	2,967	−5.93%
(Brest Region) Brest region
1	Brest (Брэст)	Brest (Брест)	Oblast	January, 15 1940	1019	346,061	338,979	309,764	+9.43%
2	Baranavichy (Баранавічы)	Baranovichi (Барановичи)	Oblast	January, 15 1940	1871	170,817	175,100	168,240	+4.08%
3	Pinsk (Пінск)	Pinsk (Пинск)	Oblast	January, 15 1940	1097	124,008	126,189	130,355	−3.20%
4	Kobryn (Кобрын)	Kobrin (Кобрин)	Raion	January, 15 1940	1287	52,432	52,520	51,166	+2.65%
5	Byaroza (Бяроза, Biaroza)	Beryoza (Берёза)	Raion	January, 15 1940	1477	28,192	28,596	29,357	−2.59%
7	Luninyets (Лунінец, Luniniec)	Luninets (Лунинец)	Raion	January, 15 1940	1449	23,469	23,654	23,608	+0.19%
6	Ivatsevichy (Івацэвічы, Ivacevichy)	Ivatsevichi (Ивацевичи)	Raion	May, 28 1966	1654	22,264	22,494	22,958	−2.02%
8	Pruzhany (Пружаны)	Pruzhany (Пружаны)	Raion	January, 15 1940	1487	18,824	18,949	19,032	−0.44%
9	Ivanava (Іванава)	Ivanovo (Иваново)	Raion	March, 11 1971	1423	16,017	16,637	16,086	+3.43%
10	Drahichyn (Драгічын, Dragichyn)	Drogichin (Дрогичин)	Raion	November, 10 1967	1452	14,743	14,846	14,744	+0.69%
11	Hantsavichy (Ганцавічы, Gancavichy)	Gantsevichi (Ганцевичи)	Raion	December, 6 1973	1898	13,248	13,759	13,894	−0.97%
12	Zhabinka (Жабінка)	Zhabinka (Жабинка)	Raion	December, 23 1970	1871	14,497	13,928	13,084	+6.45%
13	Mikashevichy (Мікашэвічы)	Mikashevichi (Микашевичи)	Raion	May, 5 1998	1785	12,027	12,916	13,016	−0.77%
14	Byelaazyorsk (Белаазёрск, Bielaaziorsk)	Beloozyorsk (Белоозёрск)	Raion	September, 16 1970	1958	10,917	11,266	12,519	−10.01%
15	Stolin (Столін)	Stolin (Столин)	Raion	January, 15 1940	1555	14,034	12,958	12,462	+3.98%
16	Malaryta (Маларыта)	Malorita (Малорита)	Raion	December, 23 1970	1566	12,593	12,746	11,751	+8.47%
17	Lyakhavichy (Ляхавічы, Liahavichy)	Lyakhovichi (Ляховичи)	Raion	January, 15 1940	1572	10,537	10,701	10,997	−2.69%
18	Kamyenyets (Камянец, Kamianiec)	Kamenets (Каменец)	Raion	June, 24 1983	1276	8,133	8,336	8,447	−1.31%
19	Davyd-Haradok (Давыд-Гарадок, Davyd-Garadok)	David-Gorodok (Давид-Городок)	Raion	January, 15 1940	1127	5,658	5,943	6,573	−9.58%
20	Vysokaye (Высокае, Vysokaje)	Vysokoye (Высокое)	Raion	January, 15 1940	1494	4,941	4,827	5,376	−10.21%
21	Kosava (Косава)	Kossovo (Коссово)	Raion	January, 15 1940	1494	1,837	1,958	2,029	−3.50%
(Grodno Region) Hrodna (Grodno) region
1	Hrodna (Гродна, Grodna)	Grodno (Гродно)	Oblast	January, 15 1940	1127	363,718	355,932	327,540	+8.67%
2	Lida (Ліда)	Lida (Лида)	Raion	January, 15 1940	1323	103,262	102,748	97,629	+5.24%
3	Slonim (Слонім)	Slonim (Слоним)	Raion	January, 15 1940	1252	48,402	50,068	48,970	+2.24%
4	Vawkavysk (Ваўкавыск)	Volkovysk (Волковыск)	Raion	January, 15 1940	1005	41,020	42,980	44,167	−2.69%
5	Smarhon (Смаргонь, Smargon)	Smorgon (Сморгонь)	Raion	January, 15 1940	1503	35,072	36,237	36,283	−0.13%
6	Navahrudak (Навагрудак, Navagrudak)	Novogrudok (Новогрудок)	Raion	January, 15 1940	1044	27,624	28,513	29,336	−2.81%
7	Masty (Масты)	Mosty (Мосты)	Raion	July, 22 1955	1486	14,239	15,222	16,595	−8.27%
8	Shchuchyn (Шчучын)	Shchuchin (Щучин)	Raion	August, 31 1962	1487	15,127	15,910	15,042	+5.77%
9	Ashmyany (Ашмяны, Ashmiany)	Oshmyany (Ошмяны)	Raion	January, 15 1940	1341	16,804	16,694	14,813	+12.70%
10	Skidzyel’ (Скідзель, Skidziel)	Skidel’ (Скидель)	Raion	January, 30 1974	1508	9,667	10,422	10,869	−4.11%
11	Byarozawka (Бярозаўка, Biarozawka)	Beryozovka (Берёзовка)	Raion	September, 21 1990	1875	9,395	10,326	10,835	−4.70%
12	Astravyets (Астравец, Astraviec)	Ostrovets (Островец)	Raion	March 27, 2012	1468	15,265	12,837	8,285	+54.94%
13	Iwye (Іўе, Iwje)	Ivye (Ивье)	Raion	January, 12 2000	1444	6,906	7,437	8,174	−9.02%
14	Dzyatlava (Дзятлава, Dziatlava)	Dyatlovo (Дятлово)	Raion	September, 21 1990	1498	7,596	8,170	7,853	+4.04%
15	Svislach (Свіслач)	Svisloch (Свислочь)	Raion	January, 11 2000	1256	5,851	6,443	6,886	−6.43%

== Map ==
Map legend:

Capital city
Cities and towns of regional subordination
Cities and towns of district subordination

Cities and towns of Belarus

== Gallery ==
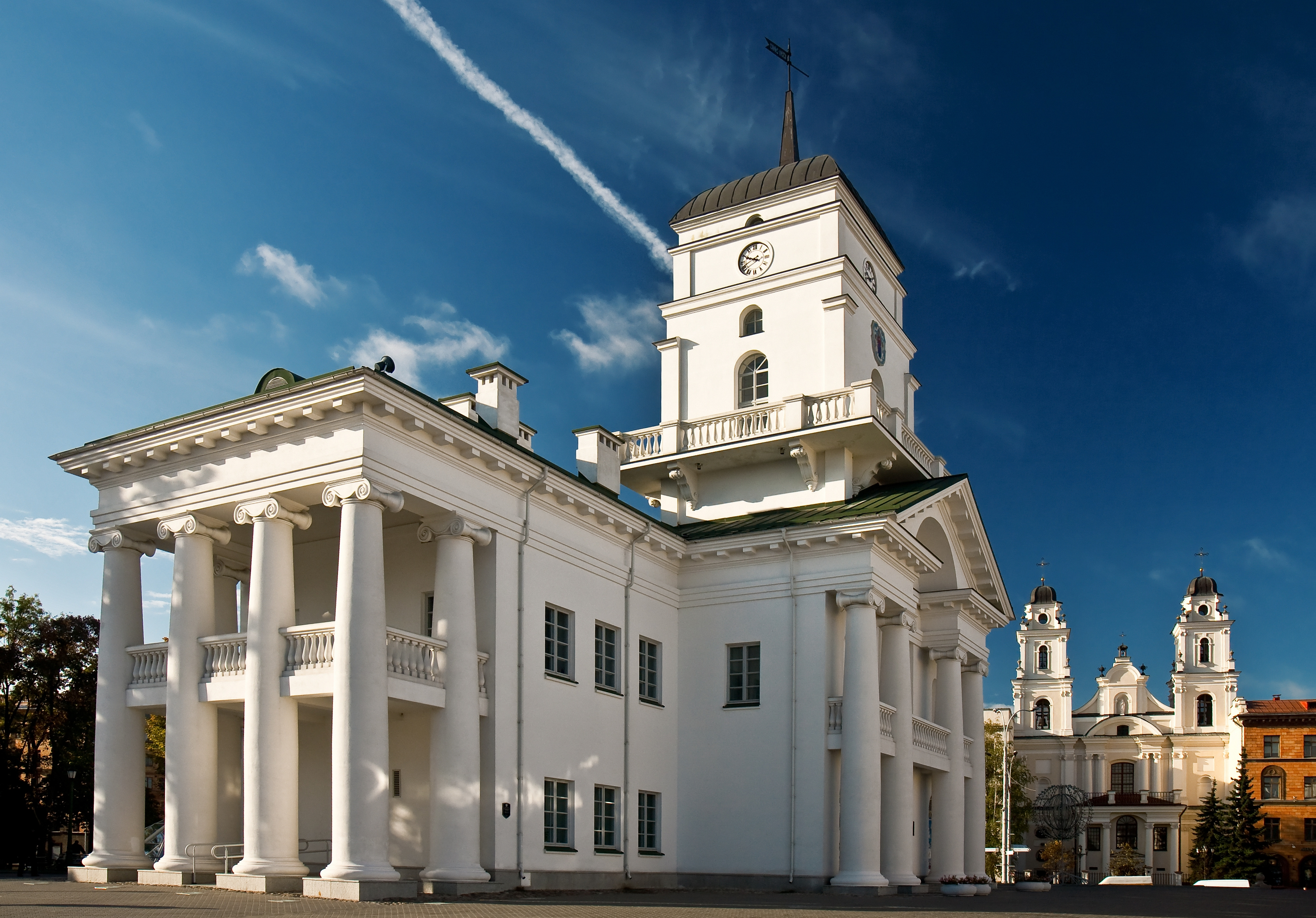
Minsk, City Hall

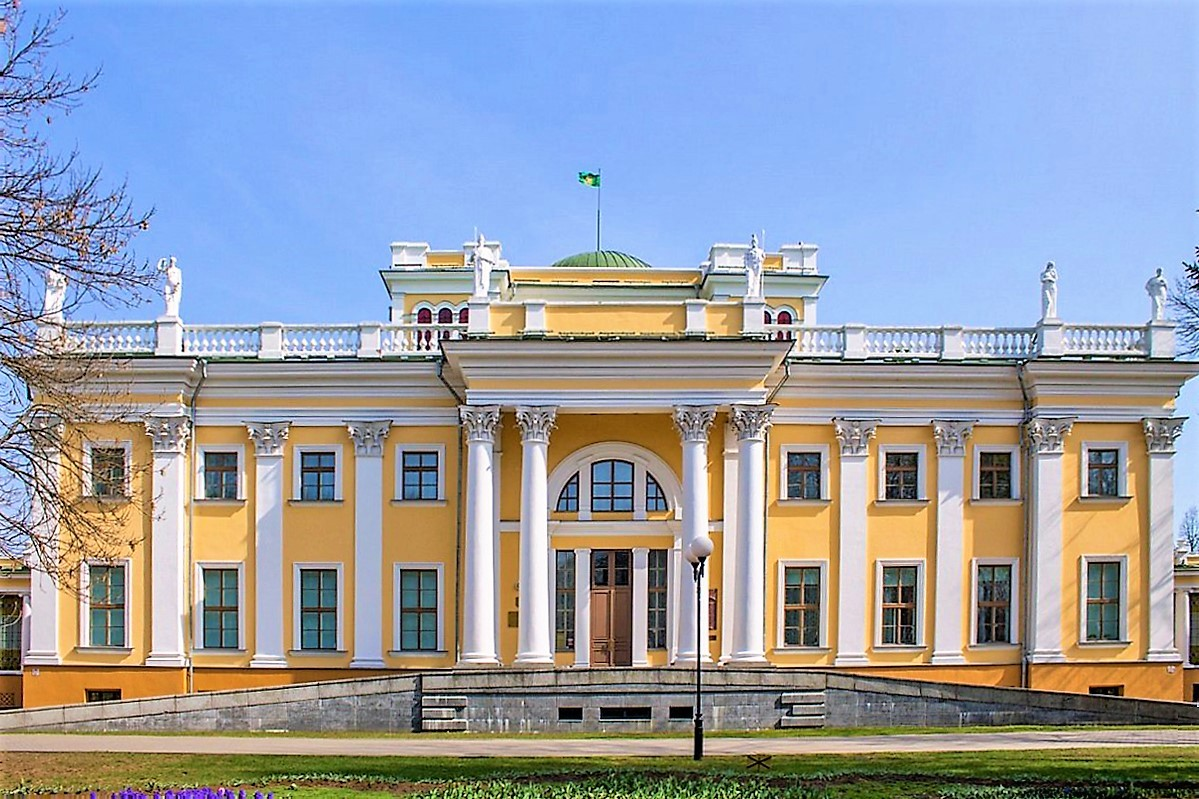
Gomel, Rumyantsev-Paskevich Residence

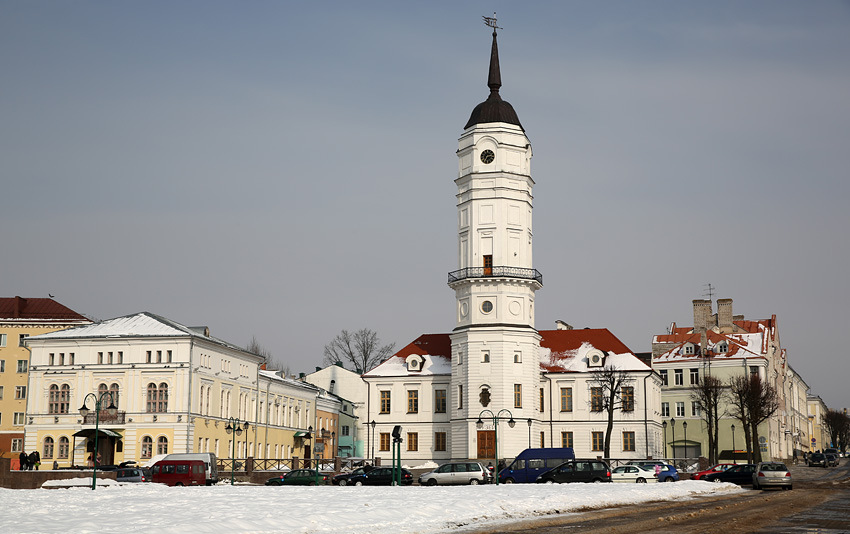
Mogilev, City Hall

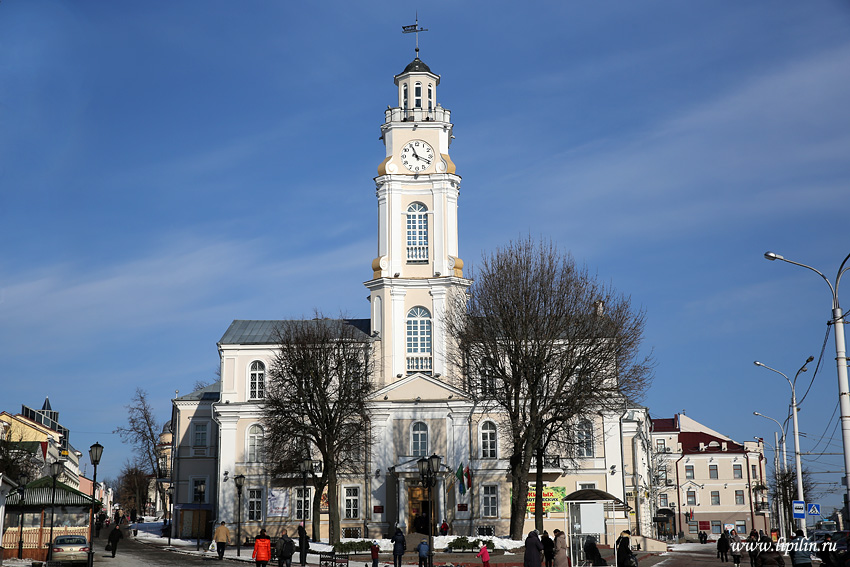
Vitebsk, City Hall

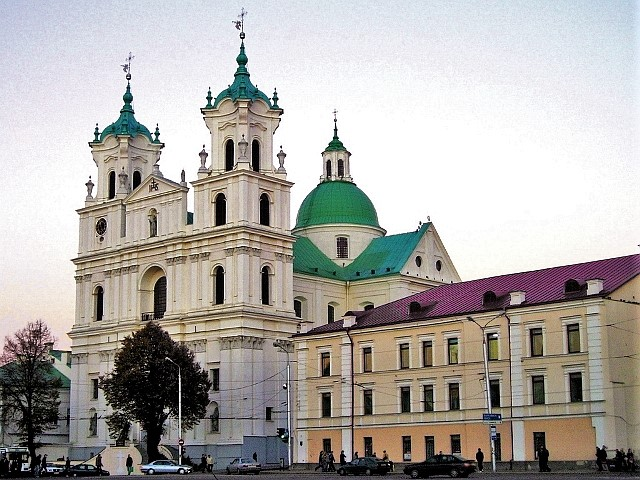
Grodno, Cathedral of St. Francis Xavier

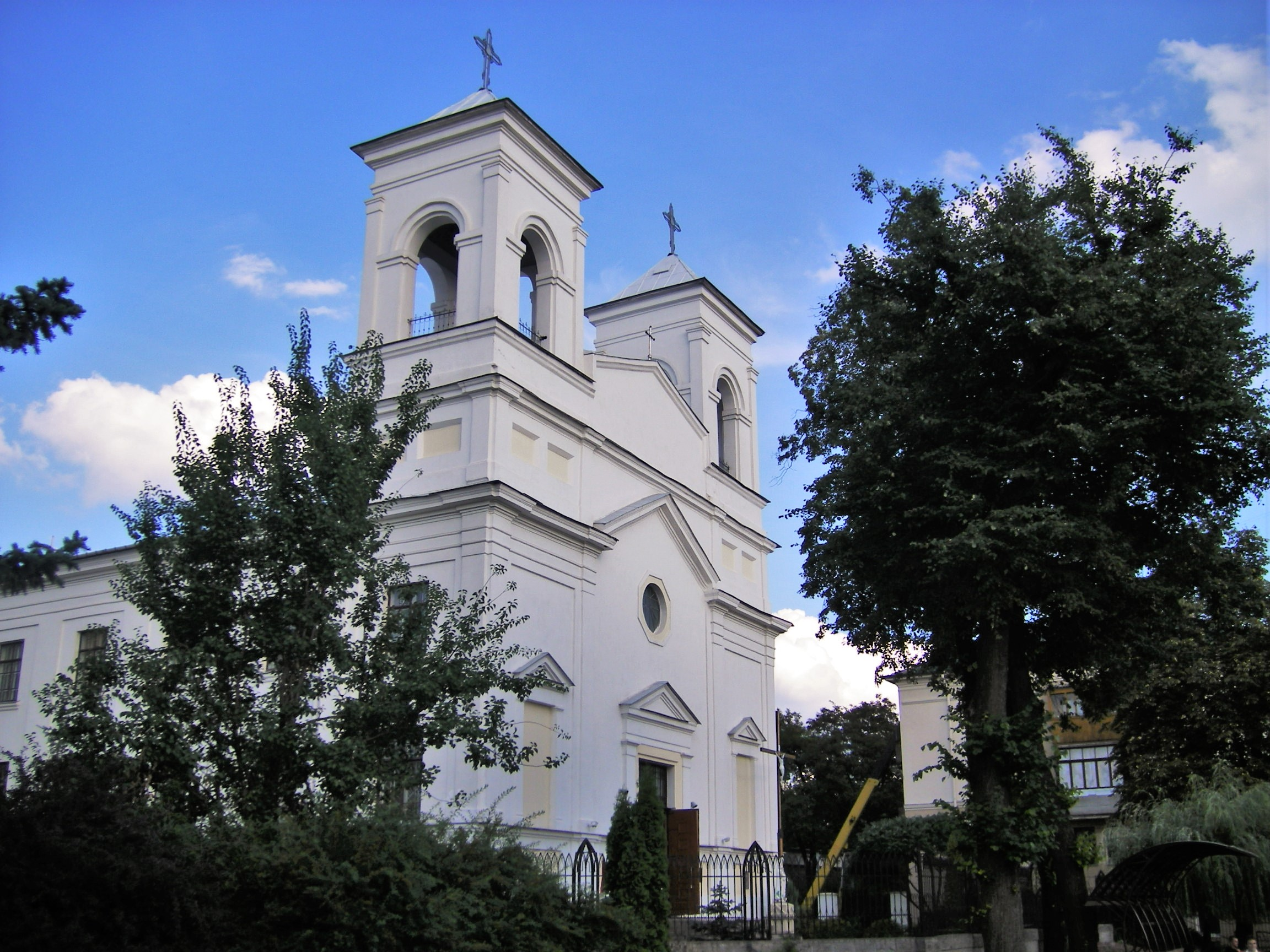
Brest, Church of the Exaltation of the Holy Cross

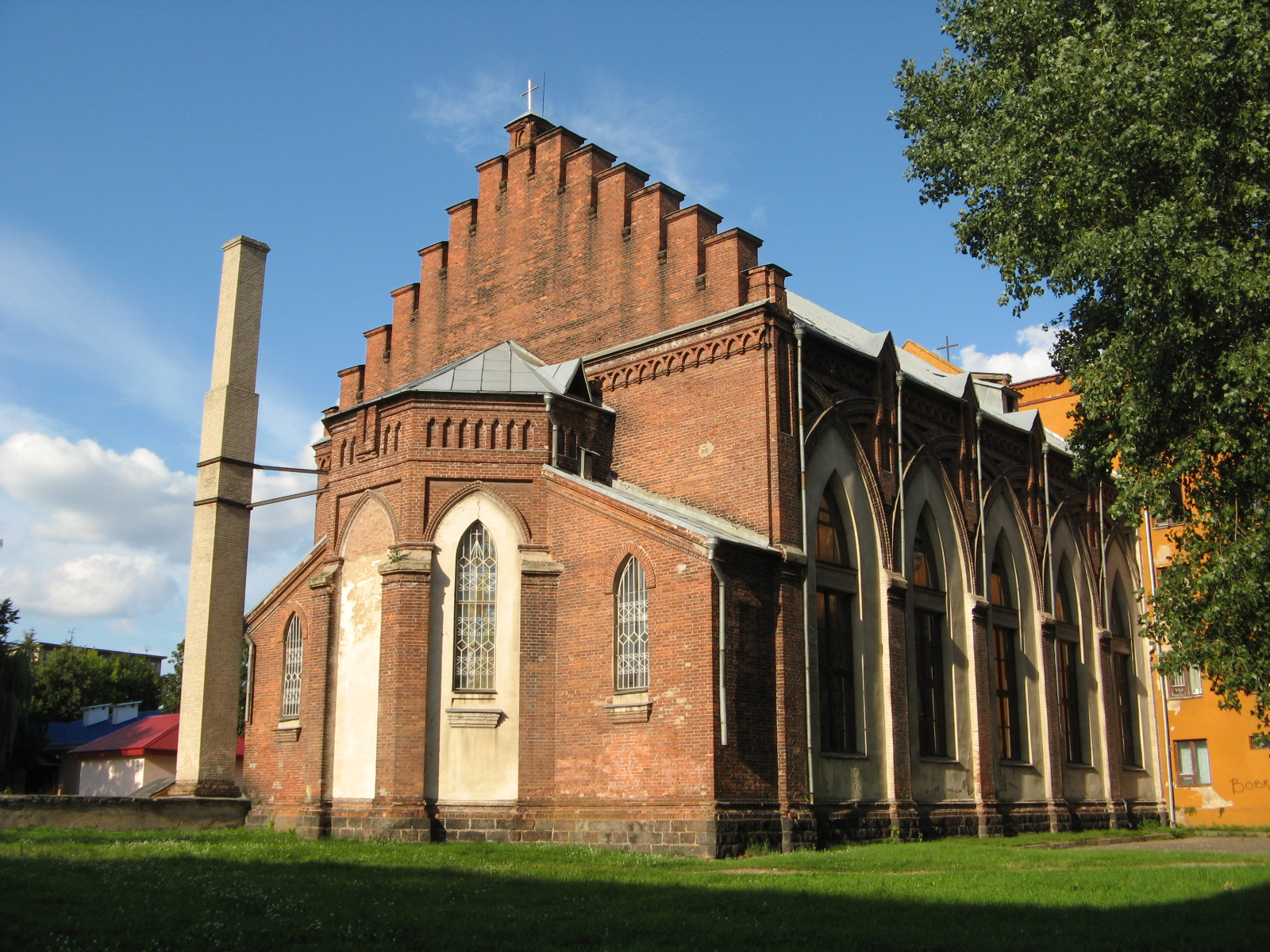
Babruysk, Church of the Immaculate Conception of Saint Virgin Mary

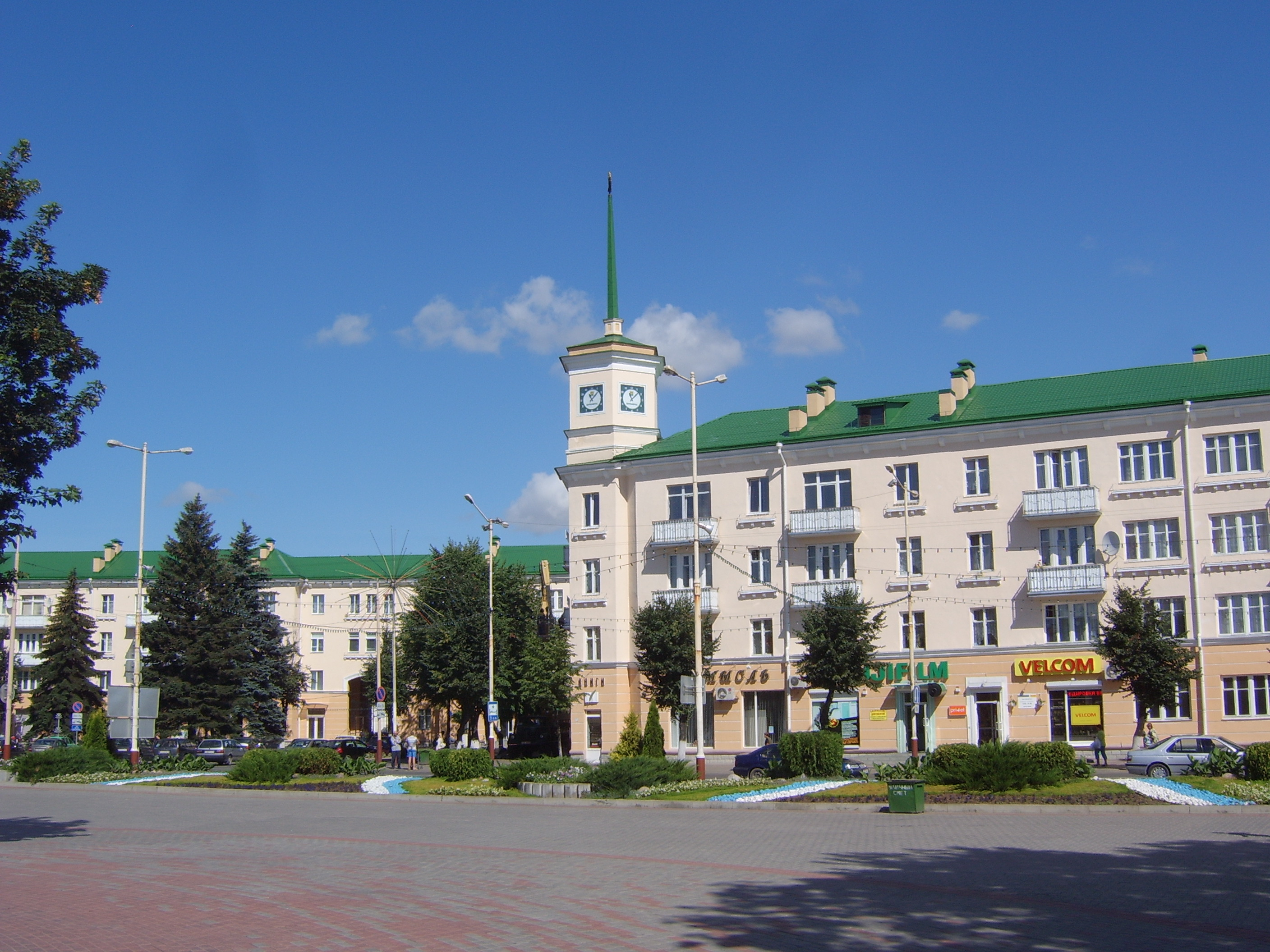
Baranavichy, Lenin Square

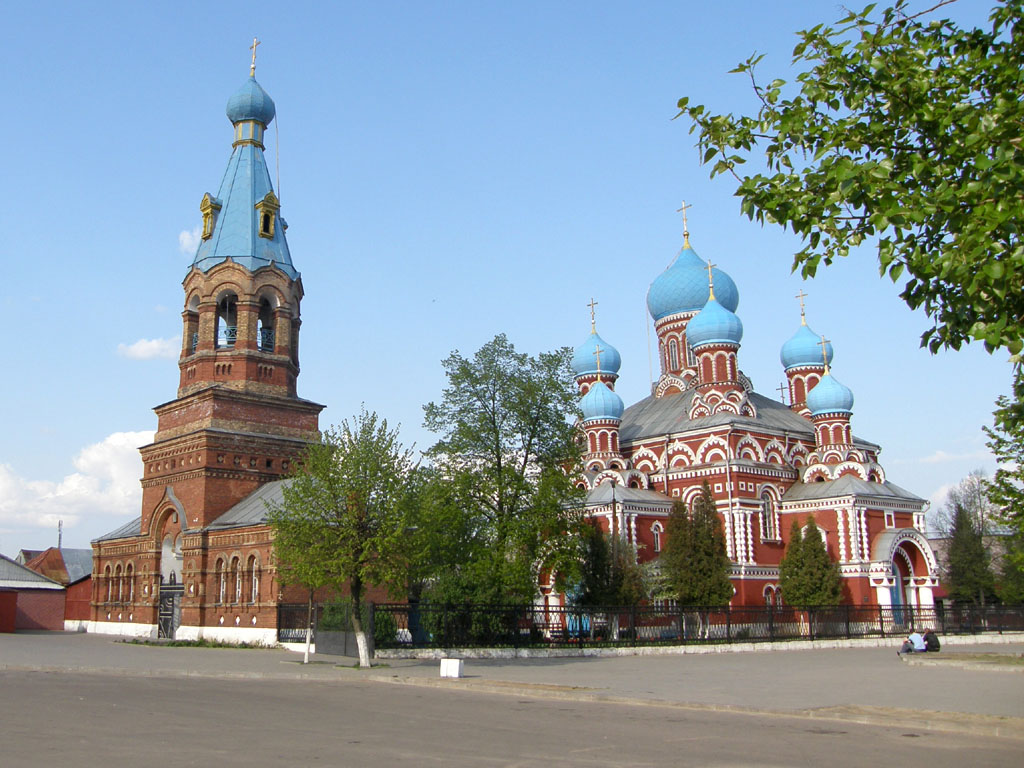
Barysaw, Church of the Resurrection of Christ

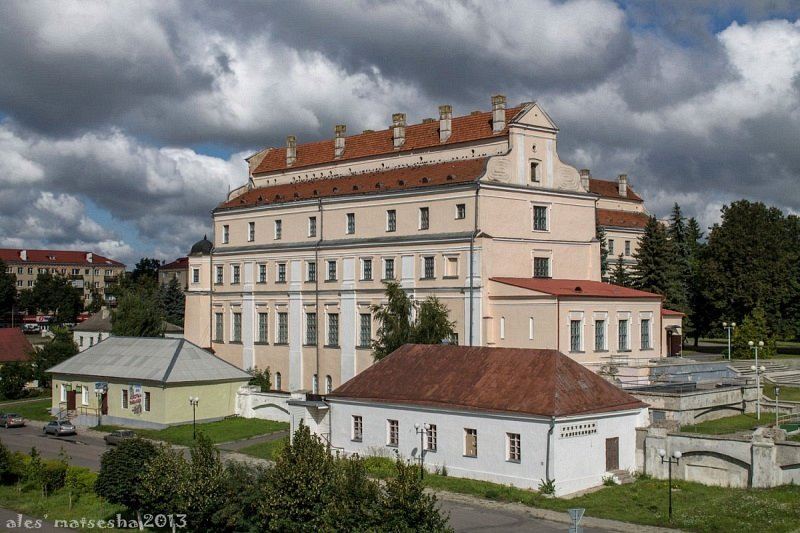
Pinsk, Jesuit collegium

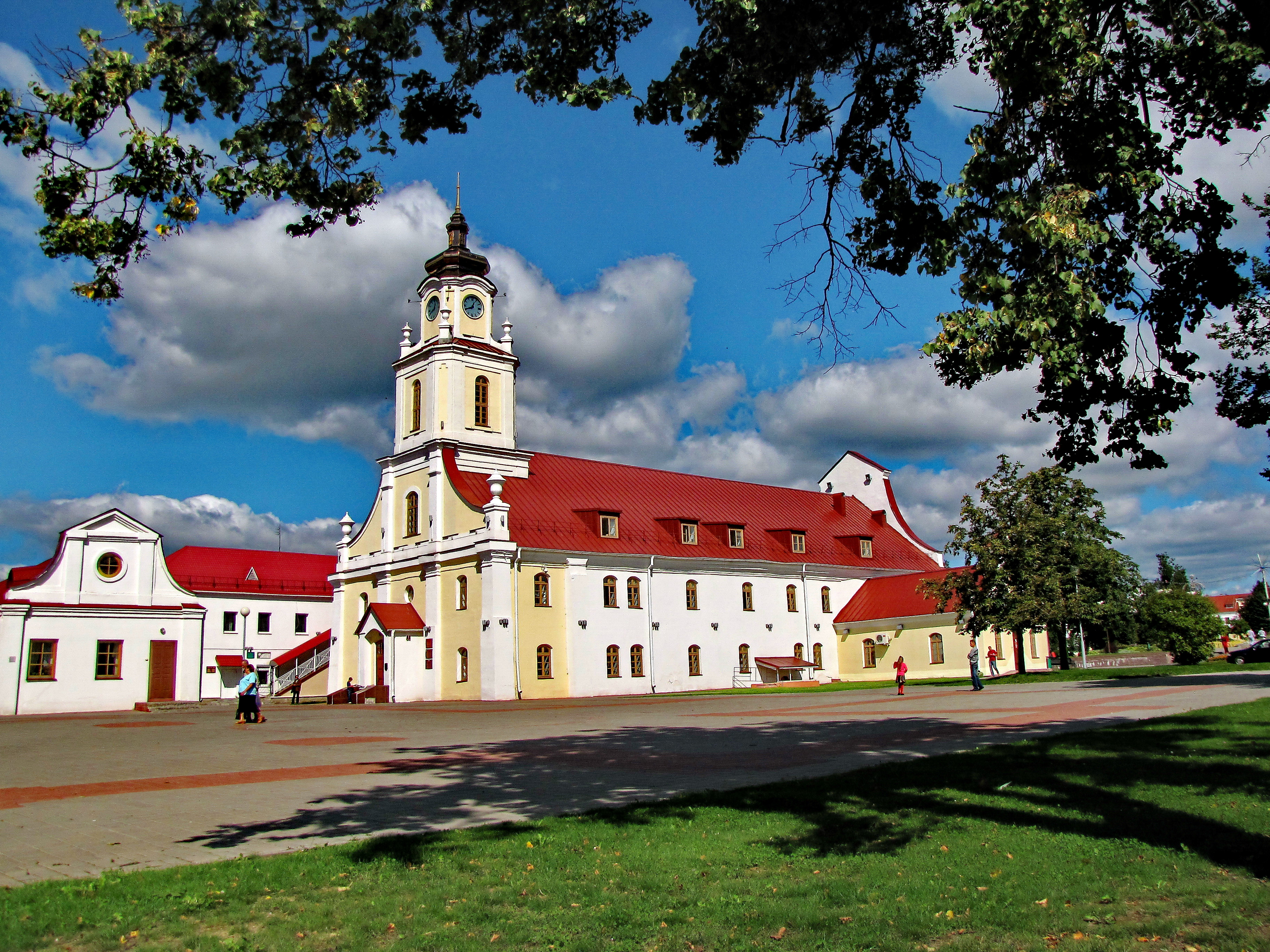
Orsha, former Jesuit Cloister

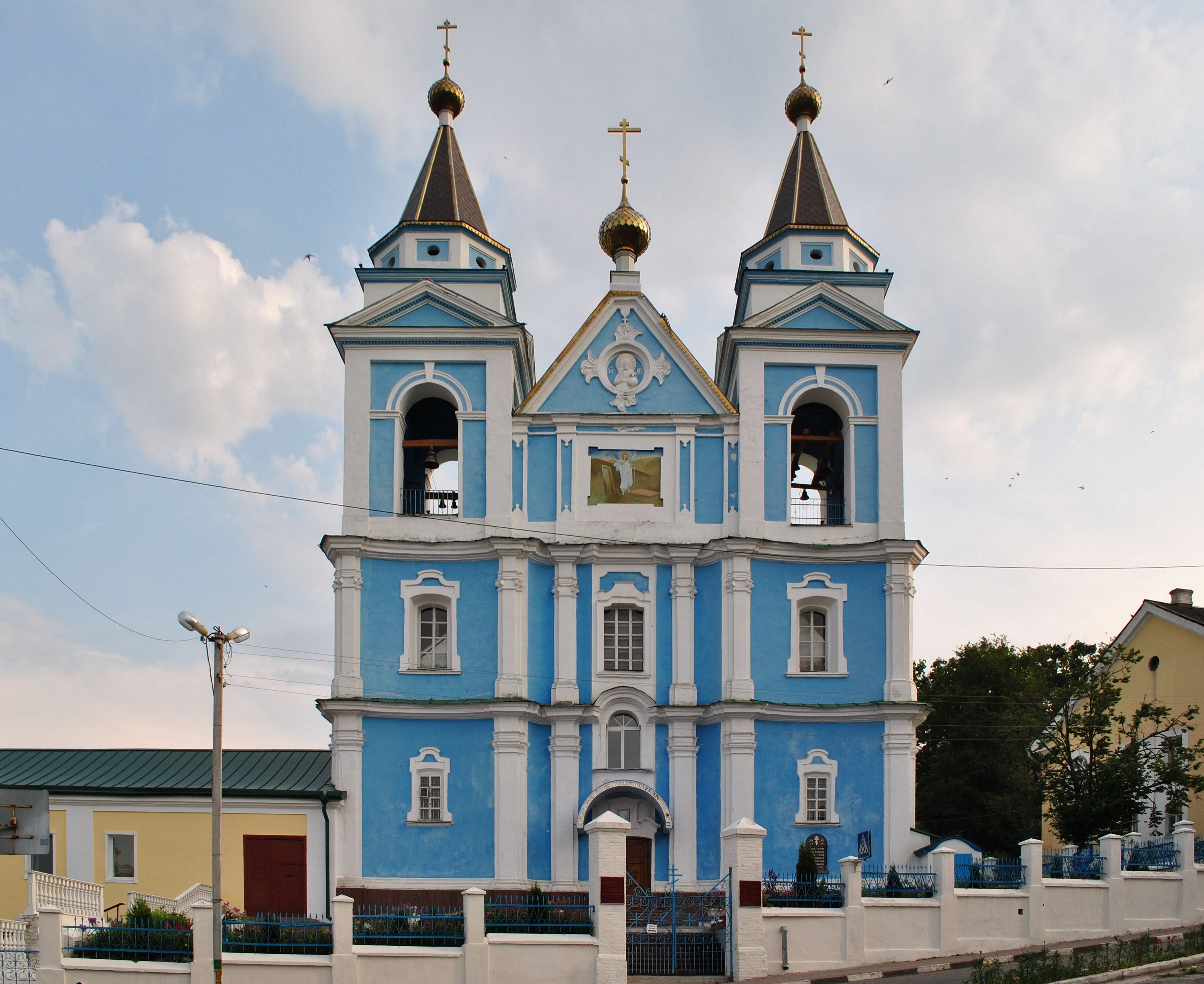
Mazyr, Cathedral of Archangel Michael

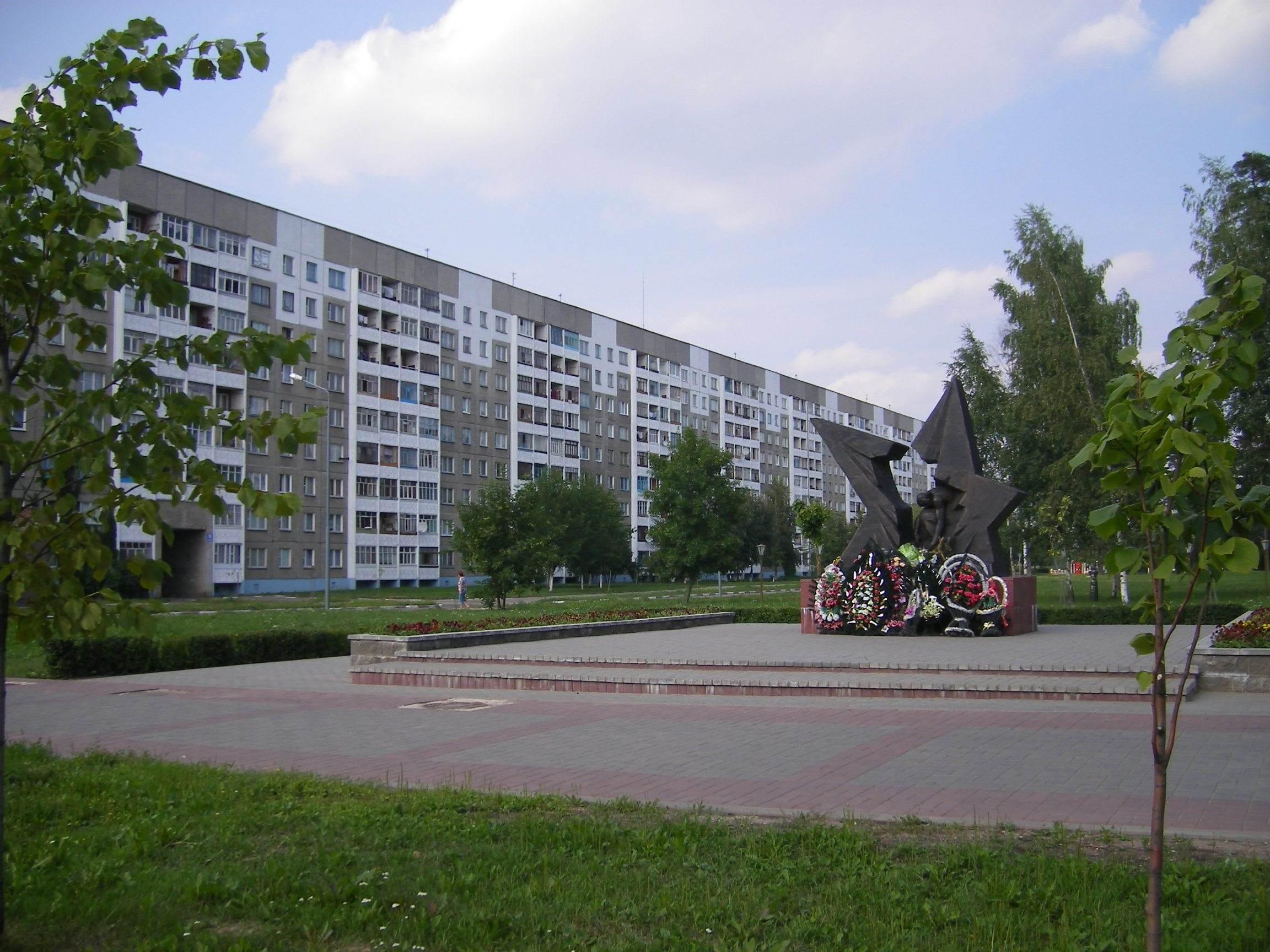
Novopolotsk, Afghanistan War Memorial

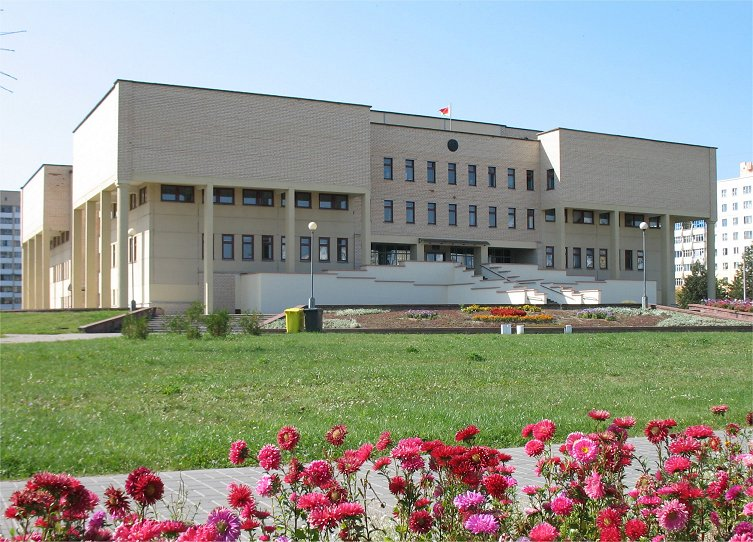
Salihorsk, Administration Building

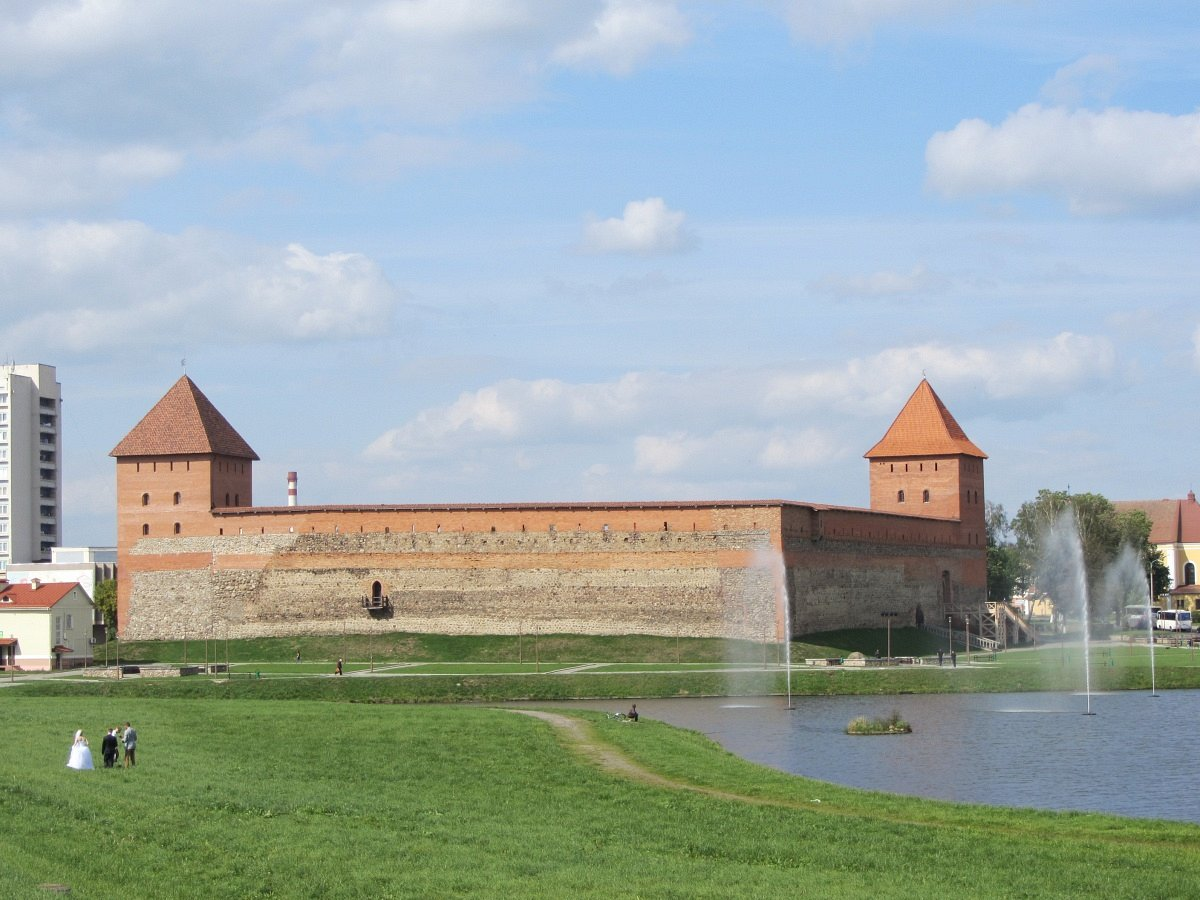
Lida, Lida Castle

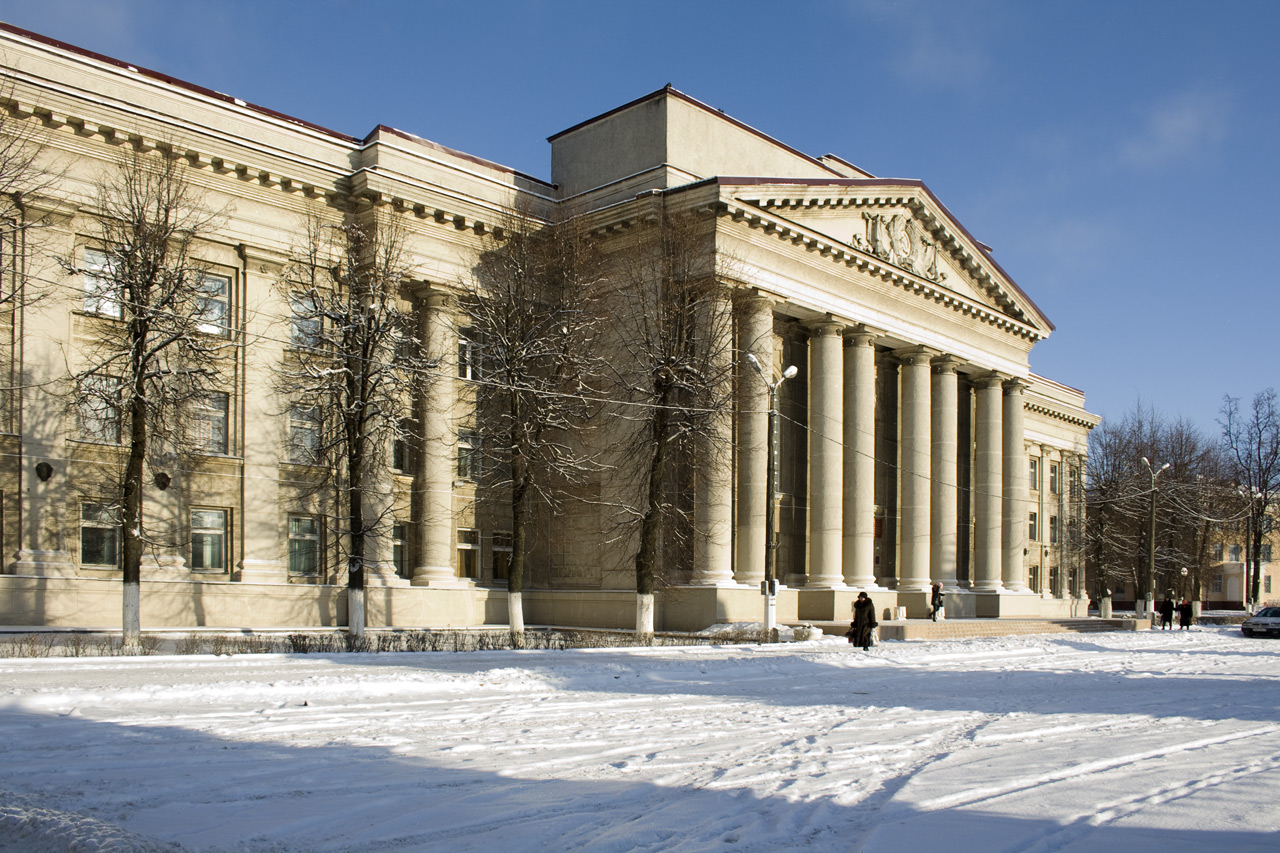
Maladzyechna, Public Polytechnic College in Maladzechna

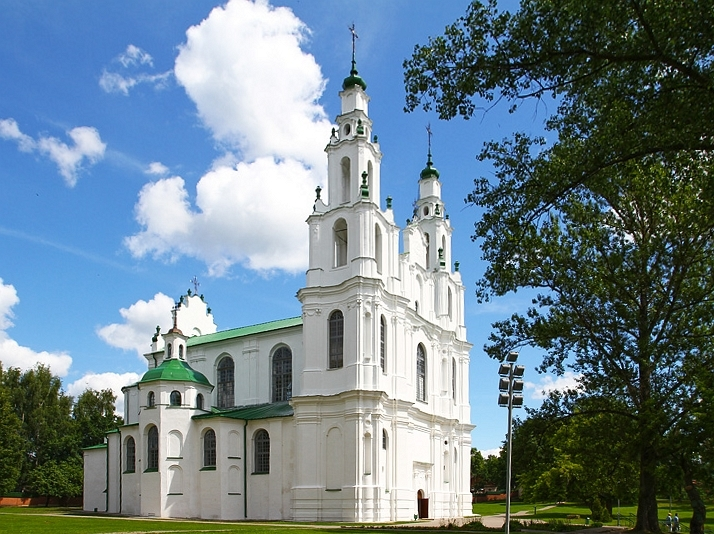
Polotsk, Saint Sophia Cathedral

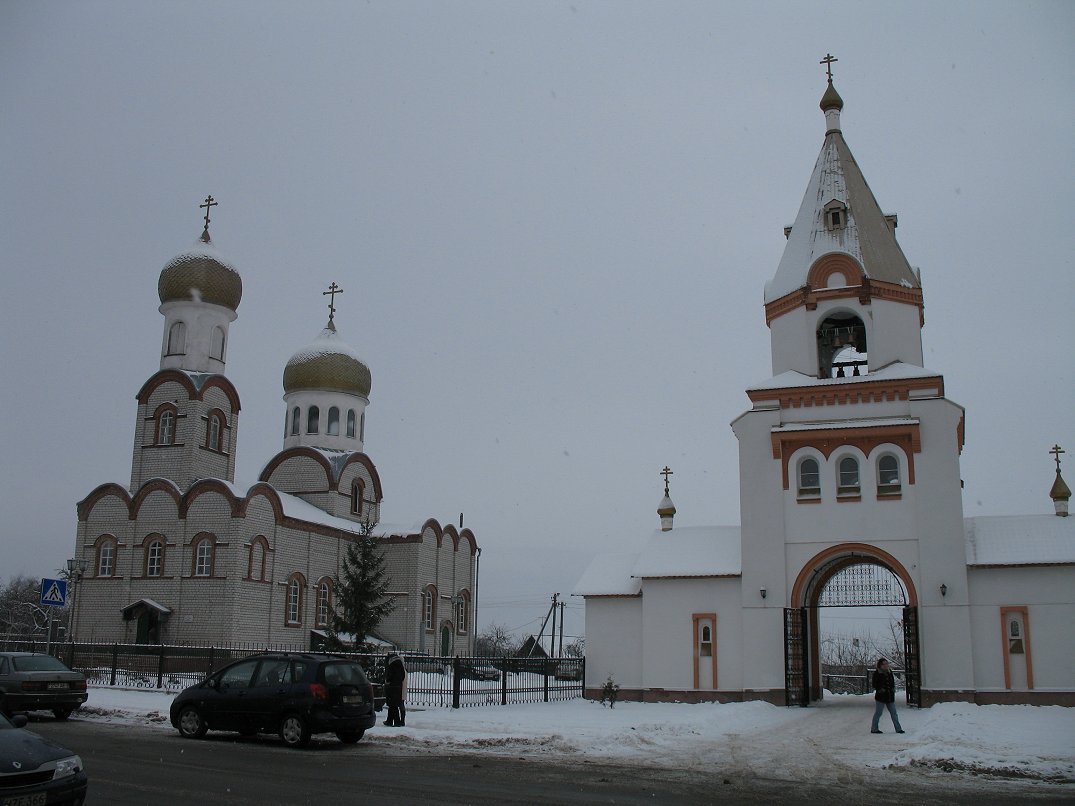
Zhlobin, Orthodox Church

== See also ==
- Instruction on transliteration of Belarusian geographical names with letters of Latin script
- Names of Belarusian places in other languages
- List of renamed cities in Belarus
