= Buda-Kashalyova district =

District of Gomel region, Belarus

Coordinates: 52°43′N 30°34′E

Buda-Kashalyova district Буда-Кашалёўскі раён (Belarusian) Буда-Кошелёвский район (Russian)
- District
- Flag Coat of arms

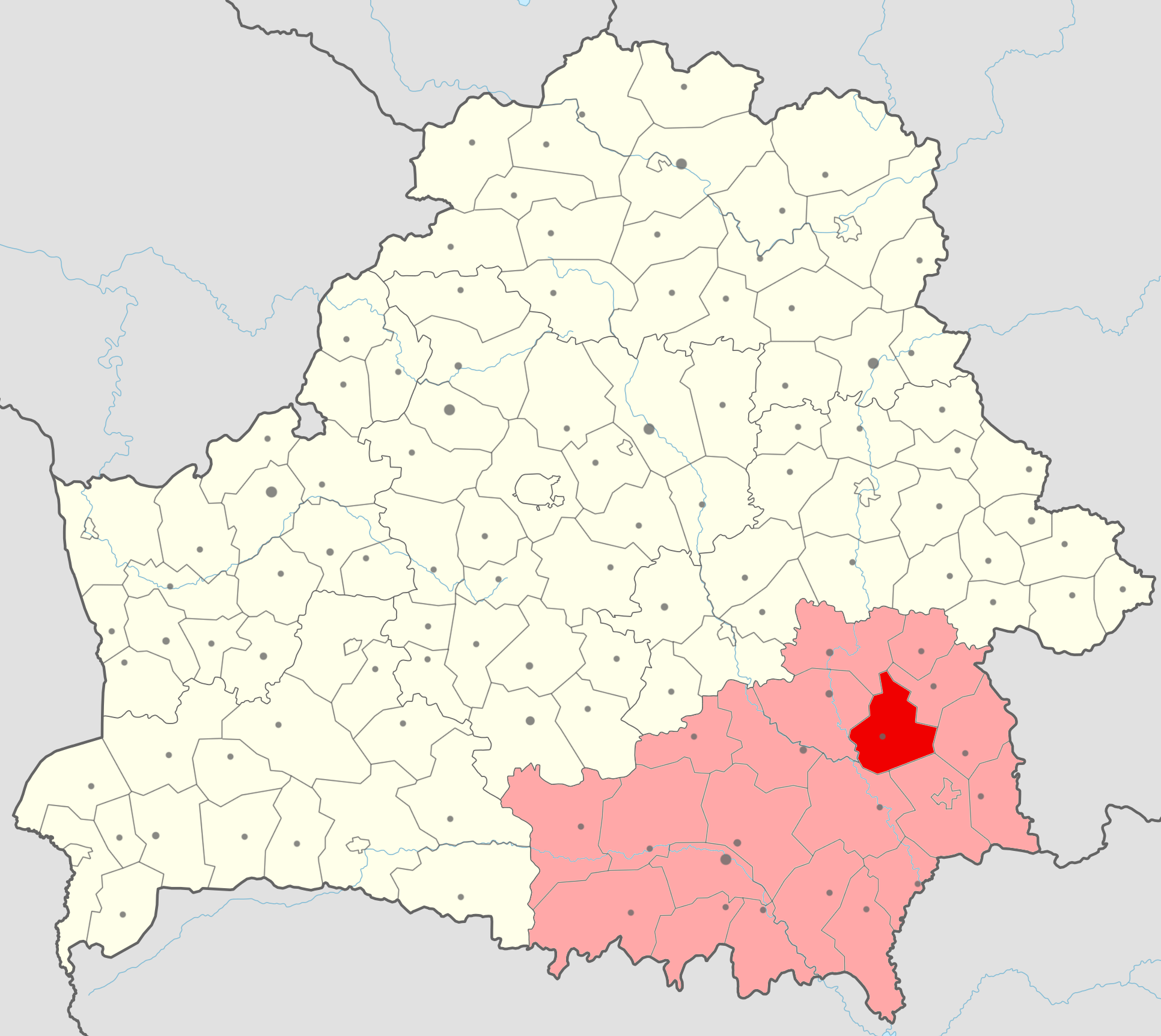
- Country: Belarus
- Region: Gomel region
- Administrative center: Buda-Kashalyova

Area
  - Total: 1,594.50 km^{2} (615.64 sq mi)

Population (2024)
  - Total: 28,869
  - Density: 18.105/km^{2} (46.893/sq mi)
- Time zone: UTC+3 (MSK)

Buda-Kashalyova district or Buda-Kašaliova district (Belarusian: Буда-Кашалёўскі раён, romanized: Buda-Kašaliouski rajon; Russian: Буда-Кошелёвский район) is a district (raion) of Gomel region in Belarus. Its administrative center is Buda-Kashalyova. As of 2024, it has a population of 28,869.

== Places of interest ==
Biological reserve "Buda-Kašalioǔski on the Dnieper lowland.
