= Buda-Kashalyova =

Town in Gomel Region, Belarus

Buda-Kashalyova Буда-Кашалёва (Belarusian)
- Town
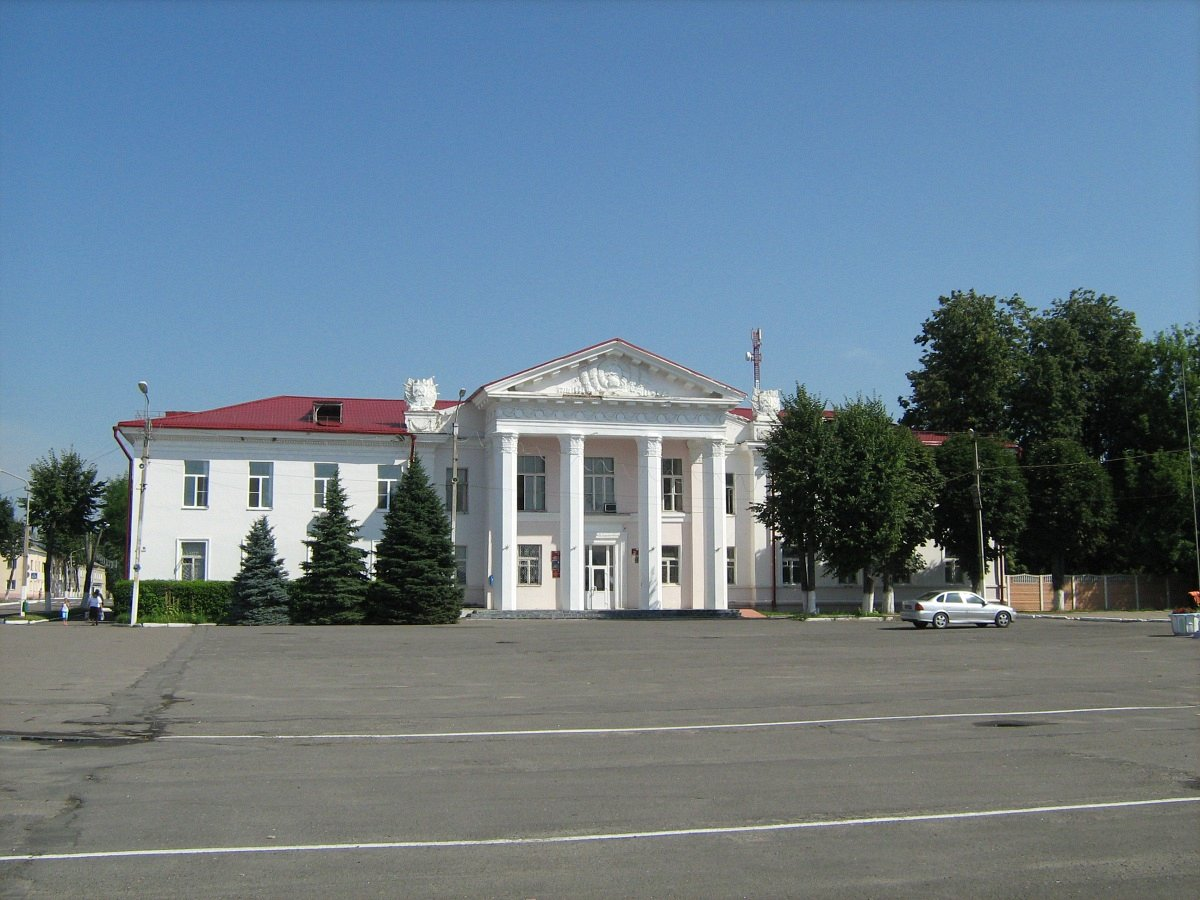

- Flag Coat of arms

- Location within Belarus
- Coordinates: 52°43′N 30°34′E
- Country: Belarus
- Region: Gomel Region
- District: Buda-Kashalyova District

Population (2025)
  - Total: 8,534
- Time zone: UTC+3 (MSK)
- Postal code: 247350
- Area code: +375 2336
- License plate: 3

Buda-Kashalyova (Belarusian: Буда-Кашалёва; Russian: Буда-Кошелёво, romanized: Buda-Koshelyovo) is a town in Gomel Region, Belarus. It serves as the administrative center of Buda-Kashalyova District. As of 2025, it has a population of 8,534.

== History ==
It was first mentioned in chronicles from the first half of 1824 as village Buda in Mogilev Governorate. Its population was 500 (1890s).

During World War II, Buda-Kashalyova was under German occupation from 15 August 1941 until 27 November 1943.
