= Baran, Belarus =

Town in Vitebsk Region, Belarus

Baran Барань
- Town
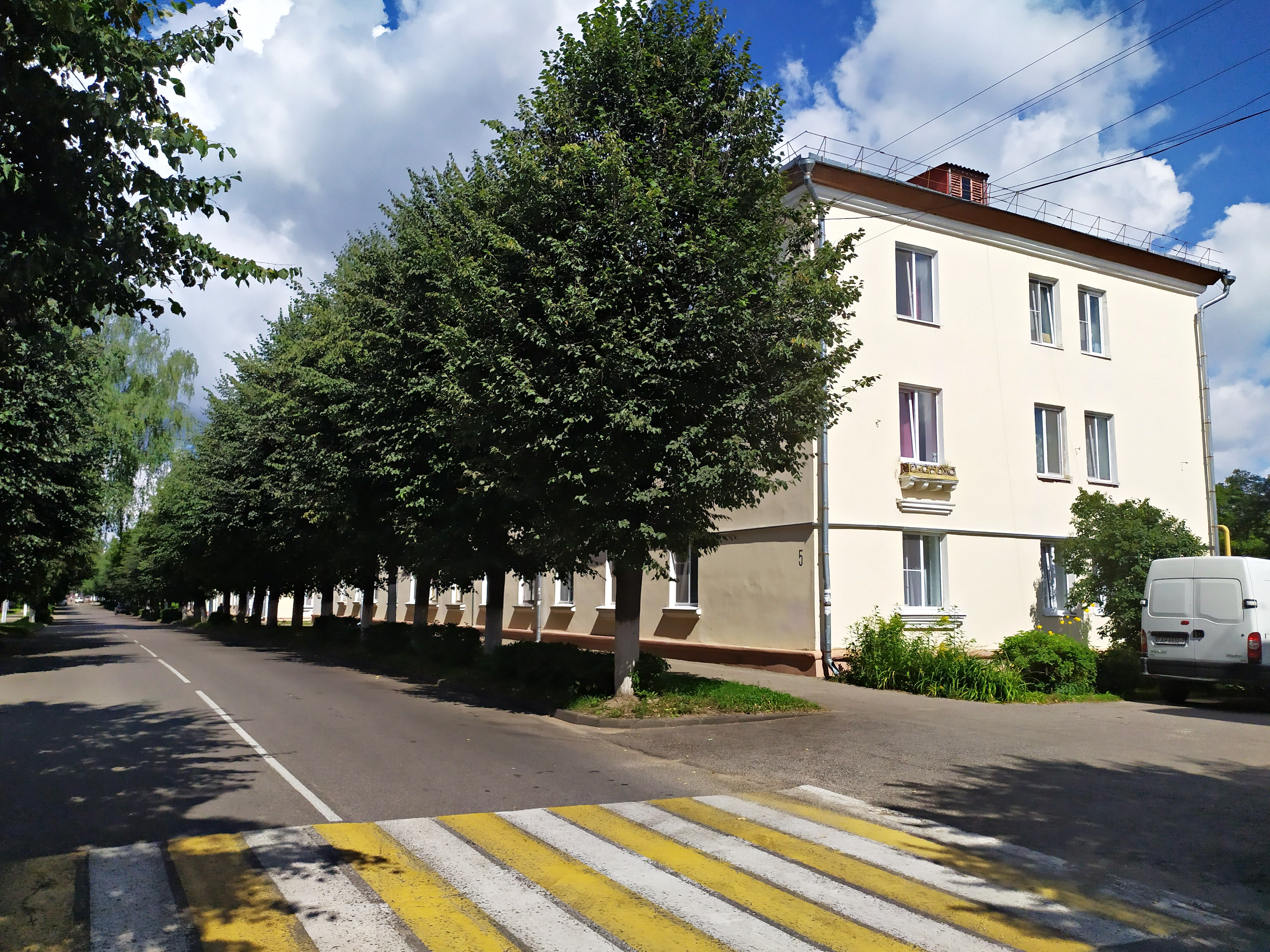

- Flag Coat of arms

- Location within Belarus
- Coordinates: 54°29′N 30°20′E
- Country: Belarus
- Region: Vitebsk Region
- District: Orsha District
- Town rights: 1598

Population (2025)
  - Total: 10,131
- Time zone: UTC+3 (MSK)
- License plate: 2

Baran (Belarusian: Бара́нь; Russian: Бара́нь; Polish: Barań) is a town in Orsha District, Vitebsk Region, in eastern Belarus. It is located in the southeast of the region and a few kilometers from the city of Orsha. In 2009, its population was 11,662. As of 2025, it has a population of 10,131.

== History ==
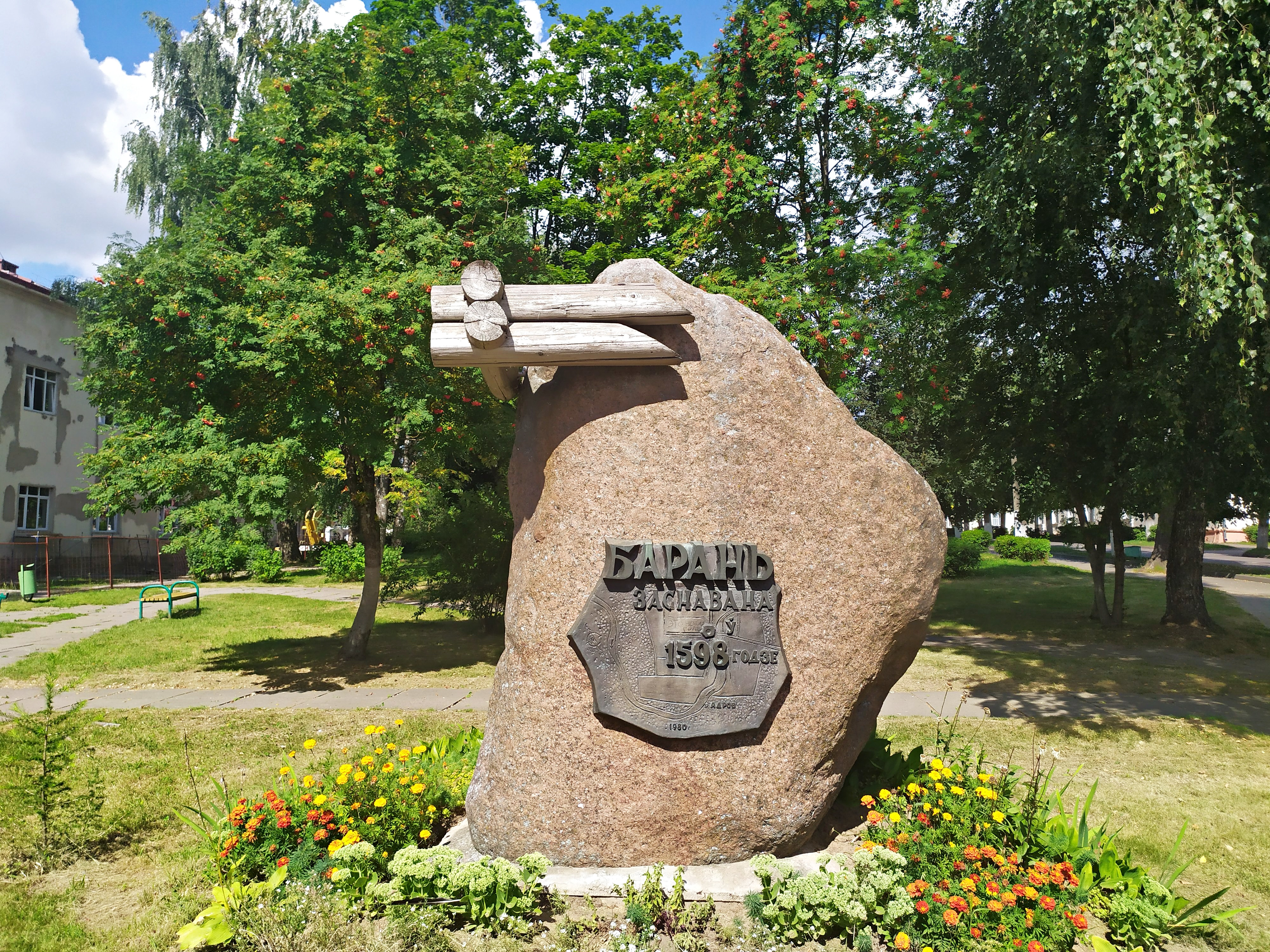
Memorial honoring the granting of town rights in 1598

Baran was first mentioned in 1470 and chartered in 1598 by Krzysztof Radziwiłł. At the time, the area belonged to the Vitebsk Voivodeship of the Grand Duchy of Lithuania within the Polish–Lithuanian Commonwealth. In 1772, as a result of the First Partition of Poland, Baran was transferred to the Russian Empire and became a selo, the center of Baranskaya Volost of Orshansky Uyezd within Mogilev Governorate. In 1777, the provinces were abolished, and Baran became a selo in Orshansky Uyezd. In 1919, Mogilev Governorate was abolished, and Baran was transferred to Gomel Governorate. In 1920, Orshansky Uyezd, along with Baran, was transferred to Vitebsk Governorate, and in 1924, the governorate was abolished.

From 1924, Baran was part of Orsha District, which belonged to Vitebsk Okrug of the Byelorussian SSR within the Soviet Union. In 1935, Baran received the status of urban-type settlement. On 15 January 1938, Vitebsk Region was established, and Orsha District, along with Baran, was transferred to the region.

During World War II, Baran was occupied by German troops from 16 July 1941 and it remained under military occupation until February 1944. The 1939 Soviet census recorded 81 Jews living there out of a total population of 1,589. Some Jews managed to flee while about half of the Jewish population remained in Baran at the start of the occupation. The Jewish population was murdered on 8 July 1942, after spending seven months performing various forms of hard labor and living in a ghetto which consisted of two houses. A witness to a mass shooting of the Jews of Baran stated: "The perpetrators were put together in a special unit of 6 persons. They had a black uniform and machine guns. The policemen threw the Jews in front of the grave, they were then shot by families".

In 1960, Orsha was made a city of oblast significance, and Baran was transferred from Orsha District and became subordinate to the city of Orsha. In 1972, Baran received town status.

== Economy ==
=== Industry ===
In 1873 Mehzhinsky, an estate owner, founded in Baran a mechanical plant, which was producing nails. During the World War II, the plant was evacuated to the east, and after the war it was restored and started production of radio stations.

=== Transportation ===
Baran is located on a highway connecting Orsha with Shklow and further with Mogilev. The closest railway station, also on the railway connecting Orsha and Mogilev, is Khorobrovo, just outside the town.

== Culture and recreation ==
Almost no traces of the old town survived. The only two notable pre-1917 buildings are a poorhouse and a mechanical workshop.

== Sources ==
- Megargee, Geoffrey P.; Dean, Martin (2012). The United States Holocaust Memorial Museum Encyclopedia of Camps and Ghettos 1933–1945. Volume II. Indiana University Press, United States Holocaust Memorial Museum. p. 1645. ISBN 978-0-253-35599-7.
