= Vasilyevichy =

Town in Gomel Region, Belarus

Vasilyevichy Васілевічы (Belarusian) Василевичи (Russian)
- Town
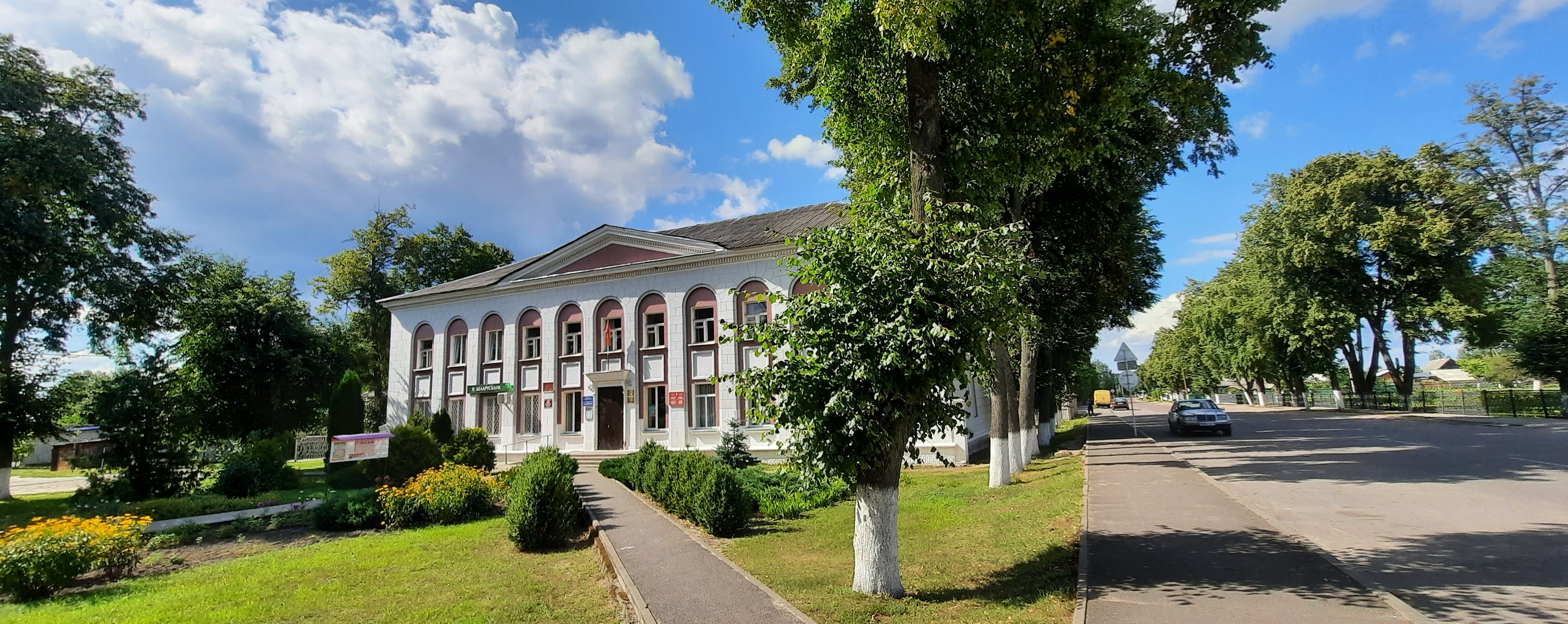

- Flag Coat of arms

- Location within Belarus
- Coordinates: 52°16′N 29°48′E
- Country: Belarus
- Region: Gomel Region
- District: Rechytsa District

Population (2025)
  - Total: 3,143
- Time zone: UTC+3 (MSK)
- Postal code: 247550
- Area code: +375 2340
- License plate: 3

Vasilyevichy (Belarusian: Васілевічы, romanized: Vasilievičy, IPA: [vasʲiˈlʲevʲitʂɨ]; Russian: Василевичи, romanized: Vasilevichi; Polish: Wasilewicze) is a town in Rechytsa District, Gomel Region, in south-eastern Belarus. As of 2025, it has a population of 3,143. It is located in Polesia, on the railway line between the cities of Mazyr and Rechytsa.

== History ==
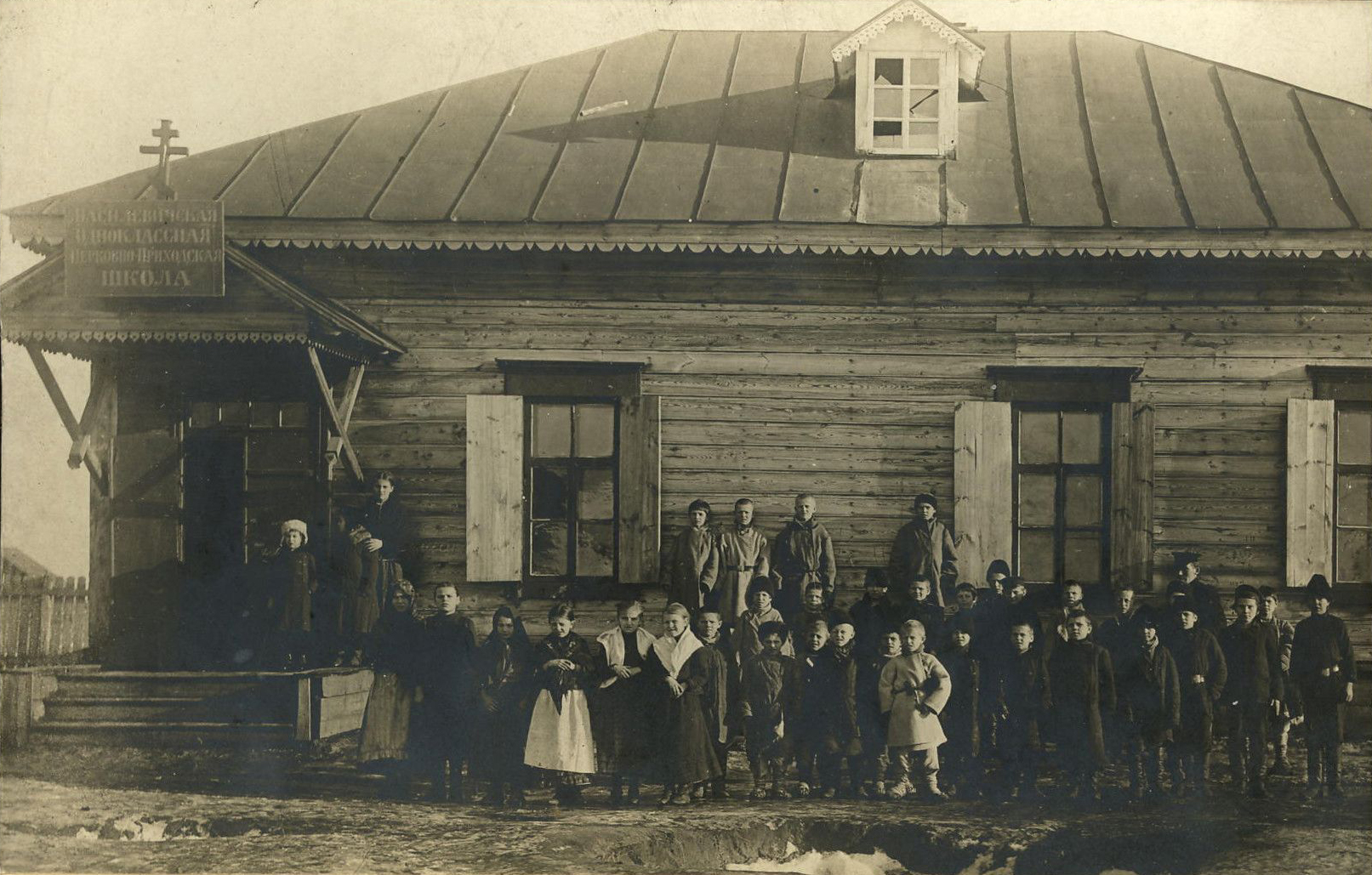
Local school in 1912

Within the Grand Duchy of Lithuania, Vasilyevichy was part of Minsk Voivodeship. It was part of the Rzeczyca starostwo of the Polish–Lithuanian Commonwealth. In 1793, the town was acquired by the Russian Empire in the course of the Second Partition of Poland. In 1857, it had a population of 956. The settlement urbanized after a railway line was built through it. In 1884, a meteorological station was established.

During World War II, Vasilyevichy was occupied by the German Army from 25 August 1941 until 18 November 1943.

== Climate ==
Vasilyevichy has a humid continental climate (Köppen Dfb) with warm to hot summers, with cold winters, albeit still mild for being so far inland at such a high latitude.

Climate data for Vasilevichy (1991-2020, extremes 1878-present)
| Month | Jan | Feb | Mar | Apr | May | Jun | Jul | Aug | Sep | Oct | Nov | Dec | Year |
|---|---|---|---|---|---|---|---|---|---|---|---|---|---|
| Record high °C (°F) | 11.5 (52.7) | 15.7 (60.3) | 26.0 (78.8) | 30.3 (86.5) | 33.0 (91.4) | 36.6 (97.9) | 35.8 (96.4) | 38.6 (101.5) | 34.1 (93.4) | 27.1 (80.8) | 23.7 (74.7) | 12.3 (54.1) | 38.6 (101.5) |
| Mean daily maximum °C (°F) | −1.5 (29.3) | 0.0 (32.0) | 5.9 (42.6) | 14.6 (58.3) | 20.5 (68.9) | 24.0 (75.2) | 25.7 (78.3) | 25.0 (77.0) | 19.1 (66.4) | 11.9 (53.4) | 4.5 (40.1) | −0.2 (31.6) | 12.5 (54.4) |
| Daily mean °C (°F) | −4.0 (24.8) | −3.3 (26.1) | 1.4 (34.5) | 8.6 (47.5) | 14.2 (57.6) | 17.8 (64.0) | 19.5 (67.1) | 18.4 (65.1) | 13.1 (55.6) | 7.3 (45.1) | 1.8 (35.2) | −2.5 (27.5) | 7.7 (45.8) |
| Mean daily minimum °C (°F) | −6.6 (20.1) | −6.4 (20.5) | −2.6 (27.3) | 3.1 (37.6) | 8.1 (46.6) | 11.7 (53.1) | 13.7 (56.7) | 12.3 (54.1) | 7.8 (46.0) | 3.3 (37.9) | −0.6 (30.9) | −4.9 (23.2) | 3.2 (37.8) |
| Record low °C (°F) | −35.1 (−31.2) | −34.2 (−29.6) | −32.6 (−26.7) | −14.4 (6.1) | −4.0 (24.8) | −0.2 (31.6) | 4.4 (39.9) | −0.9 (30.4) | −5.0 (23.0) | −13.2 (8.2) | −25.5 (−13.9) | −35.0 (−31.0) | −35.1 (−31.2) |
| Average precipitation mm (inches) | 38.6 (1.52) | 39.3 (1.55) | 41.9 (1.65) | 48.5 (1.91) | 65.4 (2.57) | 72.7 (2.86) | 94.6 (3.72) | 58.7 (2.31) | 54.8 (2.16) | 55.0 (2.17) | 45.3 (1.78) | 47.2 (1.86) | 662 (26.06) |
Source: Pogoda.ru.net

== Notable people ==
- Yury Zacharanka (1952–1999), Belarusian minister of internal affairs and oppositional politician abducted and disappeared
