= Narowlya =

Town in Gomel Region, Belarus

Narowlya Нароўля (Belarusian)
- Town
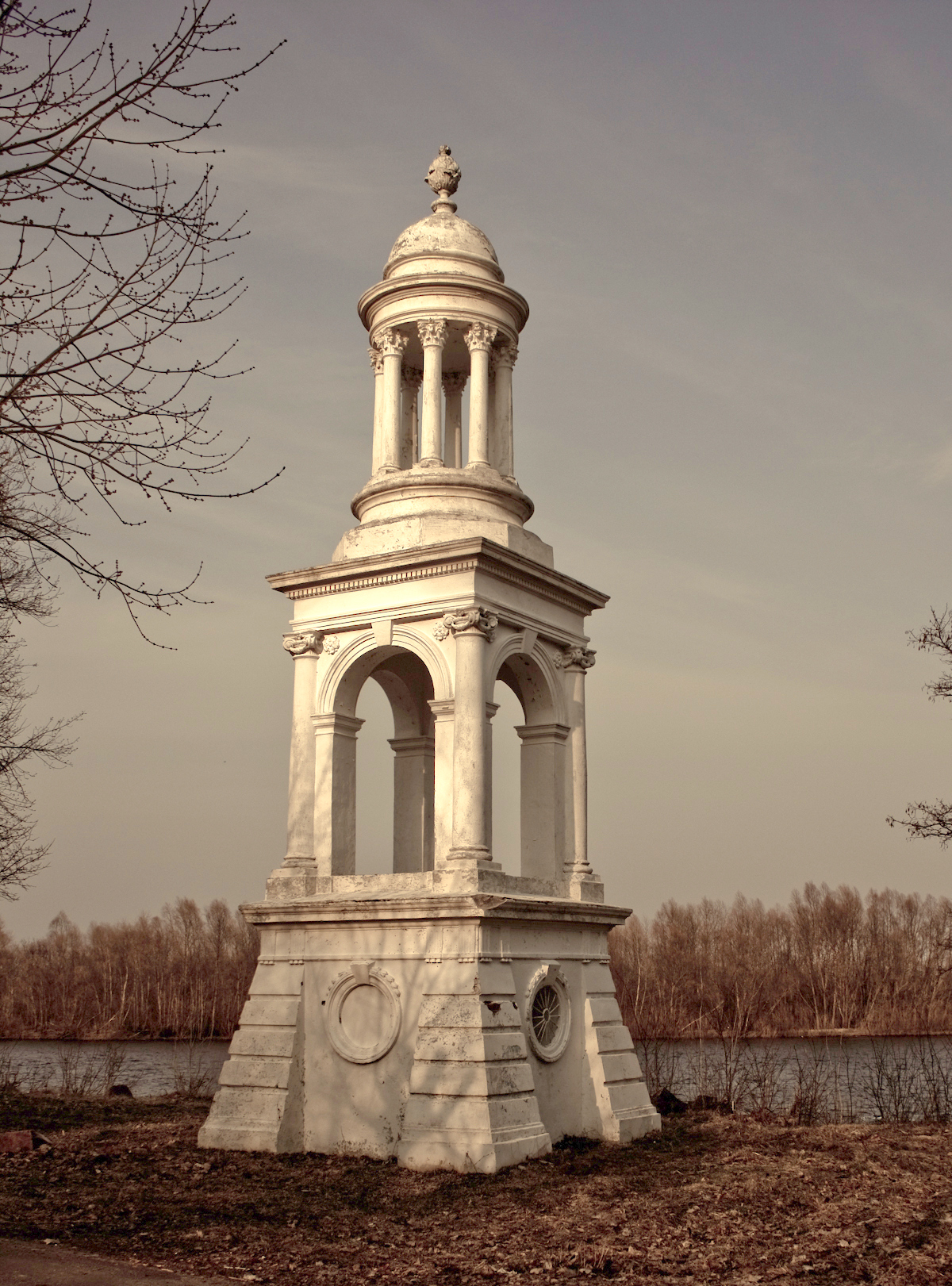

- Coat of arms

- Location within Belarus
- Coordinates: 51°53′21″N 29°57′52″E
- Country: Belarus
- Region: Gomel Region
- District: Narowlya District

Population (2025)
  - Total: 8,388
- Time zone: UTC+3 (MSK)
- Postal code: 247800
- Area code: +375 2355
- License plate: 3

Narowlya (Belarusian: Нароўля, romanized: Naroŭlia; (Note: Official transliteration.) Russian: Наровля, romanized: Narovlya; Polish: Narowla) is a town in Gomel Region, in south-eastern Belarus. It serves as the administrative center of Narowlya District. As of 2025, it has a population of 8,388.

In 1986, the city experienced heavy radioactive fallout from the Chernobyl accident. Today it is located on the border of Polesie State Radioecological Reserve.

== Gallery ==
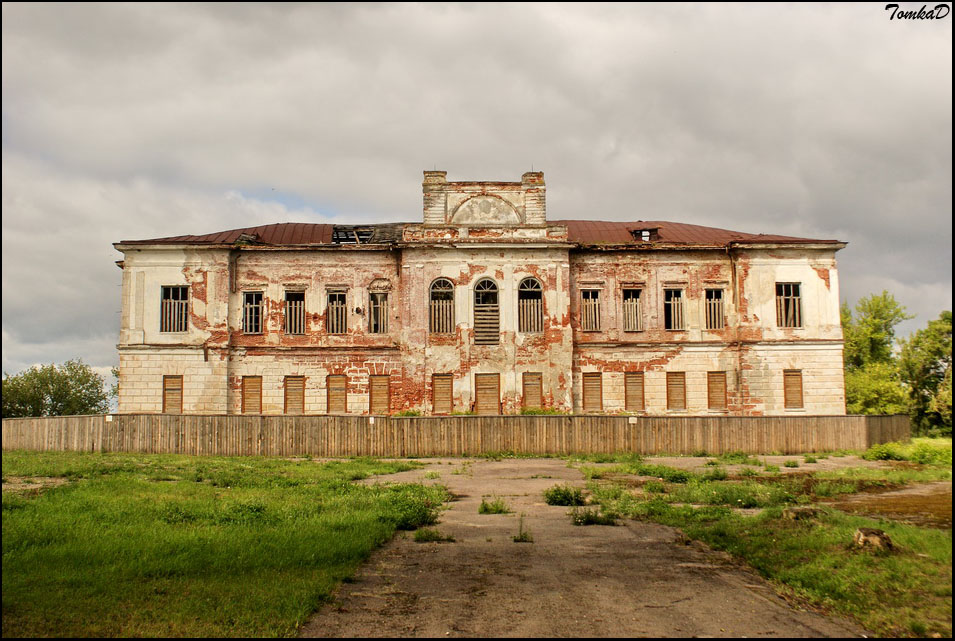
Horwatt Palace

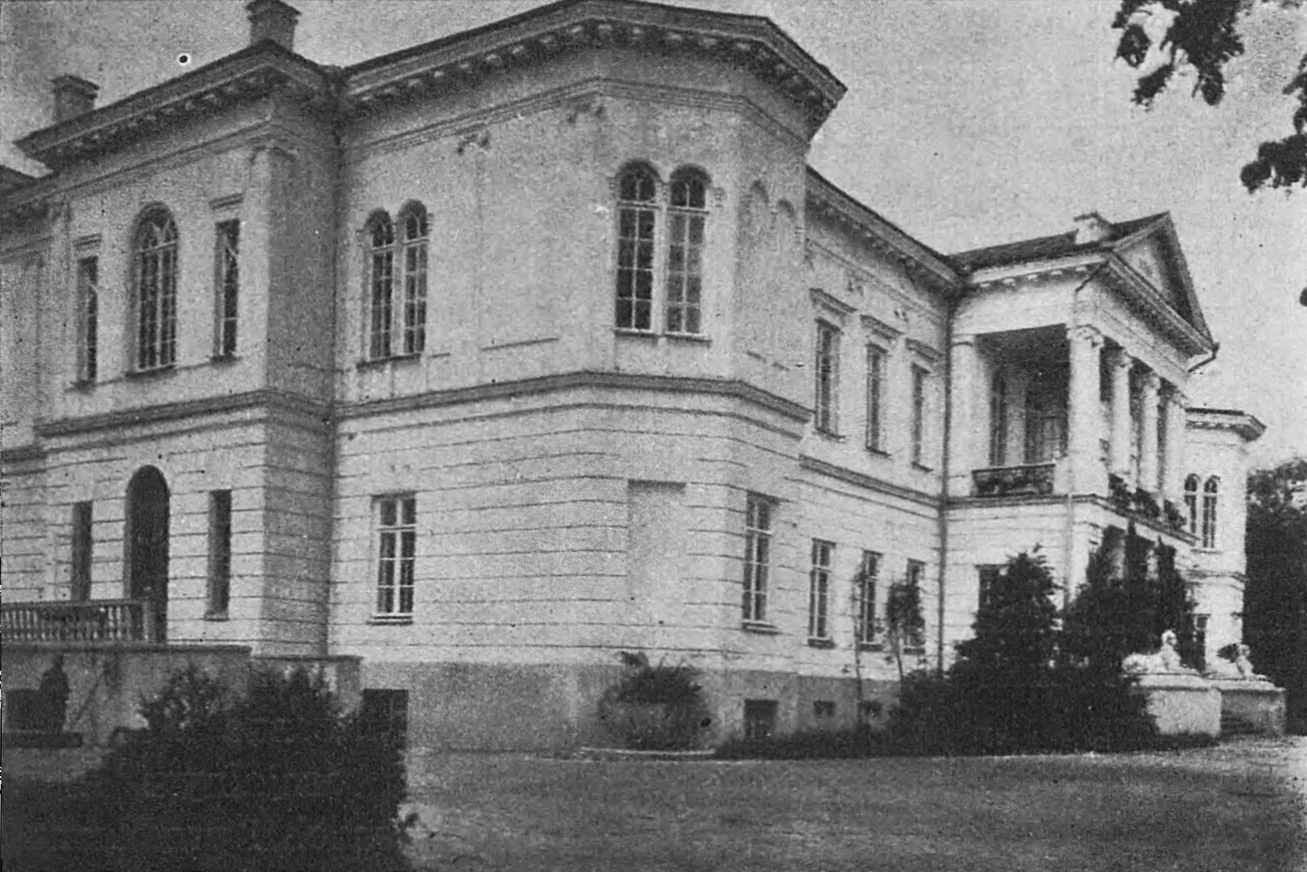
Horwatt Palace in 1914

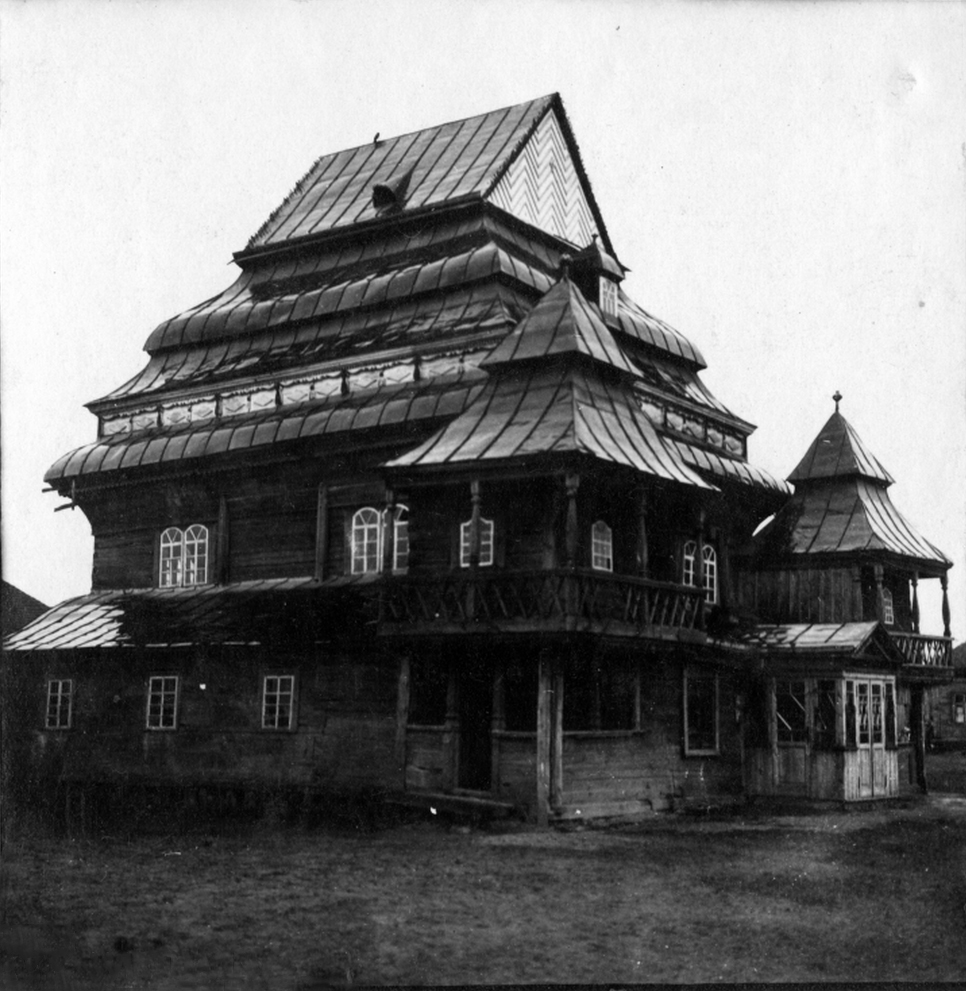
Synagogue in 1916

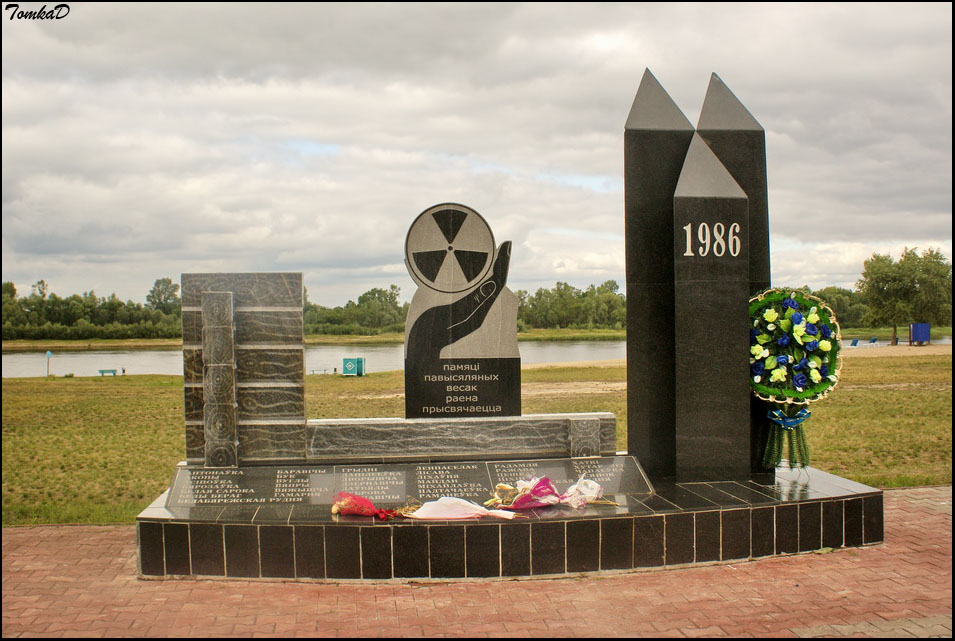
Chernobyl disaster victims memorial
