= Vysokaye =

Town in Brest Region, Belarus

Vysokaye Высокае (Belarusian)
- Town
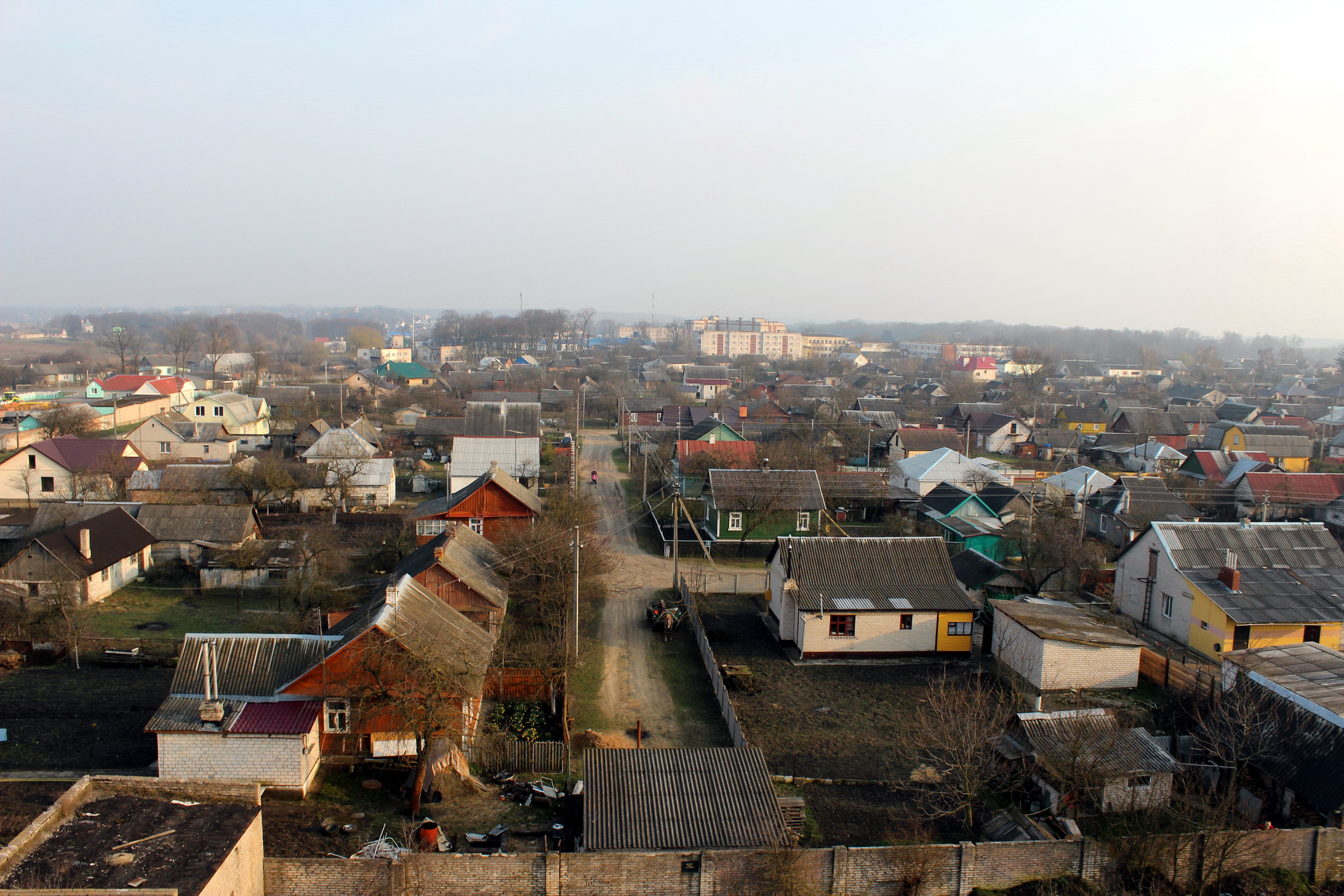

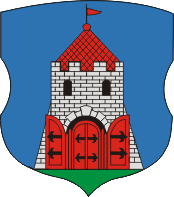
- Coat of arms

- Location within Belarus
- Coordinates: 52°22′7″N 23°22′50″E
- Country: Belarus
- Region: Brest Region
- District: Kamyenyets District
- First mentioned: 14th century

Population (2026)
  - Total: 4,940
- Time zone: UTC+3 (MSK)
- Postal code: 225217
- Area code: +375 1643
- License plate: 1

Vysokaye or Vysokoye (Note: Belarusian: Высо́кае, romanized: Vysokaje; Russian: Высо́кое, romanized: Vysokoye; Polish: Wysokie; local pronunciation: [ʋɪˈsɔkɛ]; Yiddish: וויסאָקע) is a town in Kamyenyets District, Brest Region, Belarus. The westernmost point of Belarus is located a few kilometers to the southwest from Vysokaye on the Bug River. As of 2026, it has a population of 4,940. The town has a railway station on the Brest line.

== Etymology ==
Vysokaye means "high" (same as Polish: Wysokie), as in Wysokie Litewskie (Lithuanian Heights). That was also its name before 1940, when it belonged to Poland. It is about 15 kilometers from Polish border and majority of its citizens are Belarusians.

== History ==
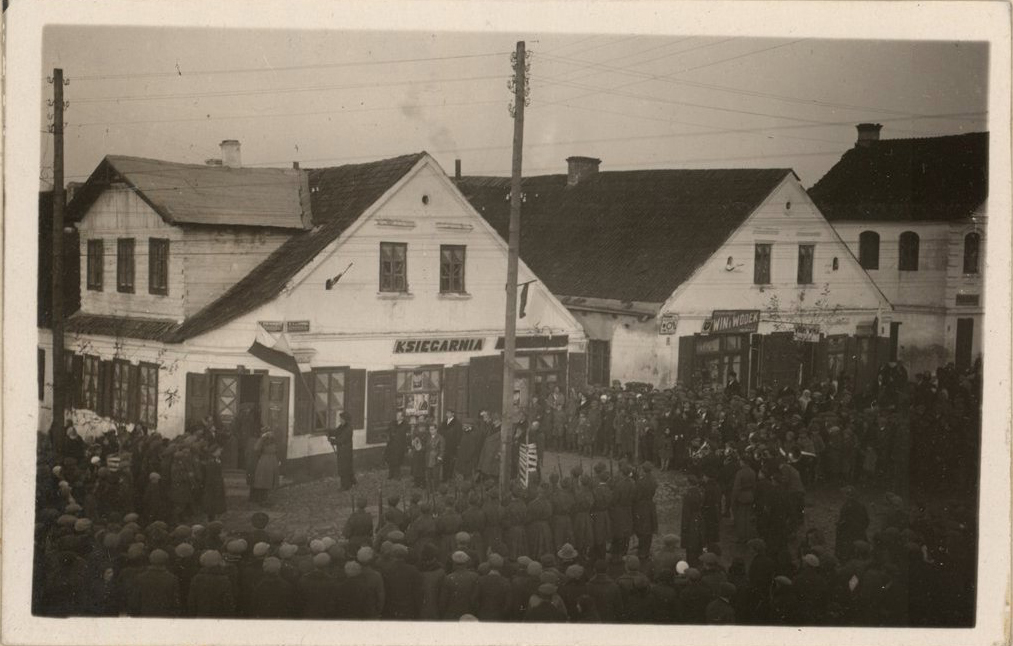
Polish Independence Day celebrations in 1933

Within the Grand Duchy of Lithuania and Polish–Lithuanian Commonwealth, Wysokie was a private town of the Sapieha, Jabłonowski and Potocki families, administratively located in the Brest Litovsk Voivodeship. King Stanisław August Poniatowski stopped in the town during his travel from Białystok to his birthplace of Wołczyn in 1775. In 1795, it was acquired by the Russian Empire as a result of the Third Partition of Poland.

From 1921 until 1939, Vysokaye (Wysokie Litewskie) was part of the Second Polish Republic. According to the 1921 census, the town had a population of 2,100, 79.95% Jewish, 18.00% Polish and 1.90% Belarusian.

In September 1939, Vysokaye was occupied by the Red Army and, on 14 November 1944, incorporated into the Byelorussian SSR. From 23 June 1941 until 28 July 1944, Vysokaye was occupied by Nazi Germany and administered as a part of Bezirk Bialystok. The Germans established a ghetto for local Jews. They were murdered on November 2, 1942.

== Climate ==
On 1 January 2023, a temperature of 16.4 °C was recorded in the town, the highest ever January temperature recorded in the country.

Climate data for Vysokaye (1991–2020)
Month	Jan	Feb	Mar	Apr	May	Jun	Jul	Aug	Sep	Oct	Nov	Dec	Year
Record high °C (°F)	6.4 (43.5)	8.5 (47.3)	15.6 (60.1)	23.2 (73.8)	27.2 (81.0)	30.2 (86.4)	31.6 (88.9)	31.4 (88.5)	26.6 (79.9)	20.7 (69.3)	13.7 (56.7)	7.5 (45.5)	31.6 (88.9)
Mean daily maximum °C (°F)	−0.4 (31.3)	1.2 (34.2)	6.4 (43.5)	13.9 (57.0)	19.6 (67.3)	22.8 (73.0)	24.9 (76.8)	24.4 (75.9)	18.6 (65.5)	12.1 (53.8)	5.5 (41.9)	1.0 (33.8)	12.5 (54.5)
Daily mean °C (°F)	−2.7 (27.1)	−1.8 (28.8)	2.2 (36.0)	8.5 (47.3)	13.8 (56.8)	17.3 (63.1)	19.2 (66.6)	18.5 (65.3)	13.4 (56.1)	7.9 (46.2)	3.0 (37.4)	−1.2 (29.8)	8.2 (46.8)
Mean daily minimum °C (°F)	−5.1 (22.8)	−4.5 (23.9)	−1.4 (29.5)	3.3 (37.9)	8.1 (46.6)	11.6 (52.9)	13.6 (56.5)	12.8 (55.0)	8.5 (47.3)	4.3 (39.7)	0.7 (33.3)	−3.4 (25.9)	4.0 (39.2)
Record low °C (°F)	−17.6 (0.3)	−15.1 (4.8)	−9.8 (14.4)	−3.3 (26.1)	1.0 (33.8)	5.8 (42.4)	8.4 (47.1)	7.0 (44.6)	1.5 (34.7)	−3.7 (25.3)	−7.5 (18.5)	−13.5 (7.7)	−17.6 (0.3)
Average precipitation mm (inches)	40.5 (1.59)	39.0 (1.54)	35.3 (1.39)	39.8 (1.57)	60.3 (2.37)	66.7 (2.63)	79.3 (3.12)	60.1 (2.37)	56.3 (2.22)	42.9 (1.69)	41.0 (1.61)	43.2 (1.70)	604.4 (23.80)
Average precipitation days (≥ 1.0 mm)	10.0	10.0	9.2	7.6	9.4	9.8	9.9	7.8	8.0	8.1	9.0	10.0	108.8
Source: NOAA

== Sources ==
- Staff (1978). Encyclopaedia Judaica, "Vysokoje". Keter Pub. House. p. 233.
- Room, Adrian (1979). Place-Name Changes Since 1900: a world gazetteer. Scarecrow Press. p. 176.
