= Belarusian Radioactive Waste Management Organization =

- Беларуская арганізацыя па абыходжанні з радыеактыўнымі адкідамі
- Abbreviation: BelRAO
- Established: 17 February 2023
- Type: State unitary enterprise
- Purpose: National operator for radioactive waste management and storage repository development
- Location: Minsk, Belarus
- Owner: Ministry of Energy of Belarus
- Director: Mikhail Kisel
- Website: belrao.by

The Belarusian Radioactive Waste Management Organization (commonly abbreviated as BelRAO) is a Belarusian state-owned unitary enterprise designated as the national operator for the management, conditioning, and long-term disposal of radioactive waste in Belarus. The organization operates under the jurisdiction of the Ministry of Energy and was established to manage operational waste from domestic medical, scientific, and industrial radiation sources, as well as waste generated by the Belarusian nuclear power plant (BelNPP) in Astravyets.

== History and function ==
BelRAO was formally established by resolution of the Belarusian Ministry of Energy in February 2023 as part of a national strategy to centralize atomic waste management infrastructure. A primary functional responsibility assigned to BelRAO is customer oversight for the planning, design, site selection, and operational maintenance of a planned national radioactive waste repository. Alongside low- and intermediate-level waste handling, the organization is mandated to arrange for the reception and isolation of high-level waste scheduled to return to Belarus following the reprocessing of spent nuclear fuel in Russia.

In executing its administrative mandate, BelRAO manages environmental impact assessments, coordinates environmental radiation monitoring, and handles technical cooperation with international regulatory authorities, including the International Atomic Energy Agency (IAEA). Under BelRAO's pre-construction management, candidate sites for repository development have included Astravyets District, Mstsislaw District, and designated regions inside the Polesie State Radioecological Reserve in Khoiniki District.

== Management and controversy ==
The enterprise's founding director, Dmitry Lohvin, managed operations from February 2023 until his resignation in April 2026 amid the active site-evaluation phase. On 13 April 2026, Mikhail Kisel was appointed as the new director of BelRAO. Prior to taking leadership of the organization, Kisel held managerial roles at the Belarusian Nuclear Power Plant and had previously served within the State Security Committee (KGB).

BelRAO's internal organization and operational transparency have faced critical scrutiny in independent media investigations. Media analyses revealed that BelRAO's administrative and technical apparatus was initially composed largely of former officials from the State Control Committee, managers from agricultural enterprises, and apparel retail executives, with a distinct shortage of specialists in nuclear physics or radiochemistry. Following the appointment of new executive leadership in April 2026, BelRAO removed organizational charts and employee listings from its public website. Furthermore, ecological commentators noted that crucial engineering calculations for the repository were conducted by Russian nuclear contractor entities under TVEL, limiting BelRAO's internal contribution mainly to geodesic survey coordination and local administrative compliance.

== See also ==
- National Radioactive Waste Repository
- Astravets Nuclear Power Plant
