= Siarhei Besarab =

Belarusian scientist and civil activist

- Сяргей Бесараб
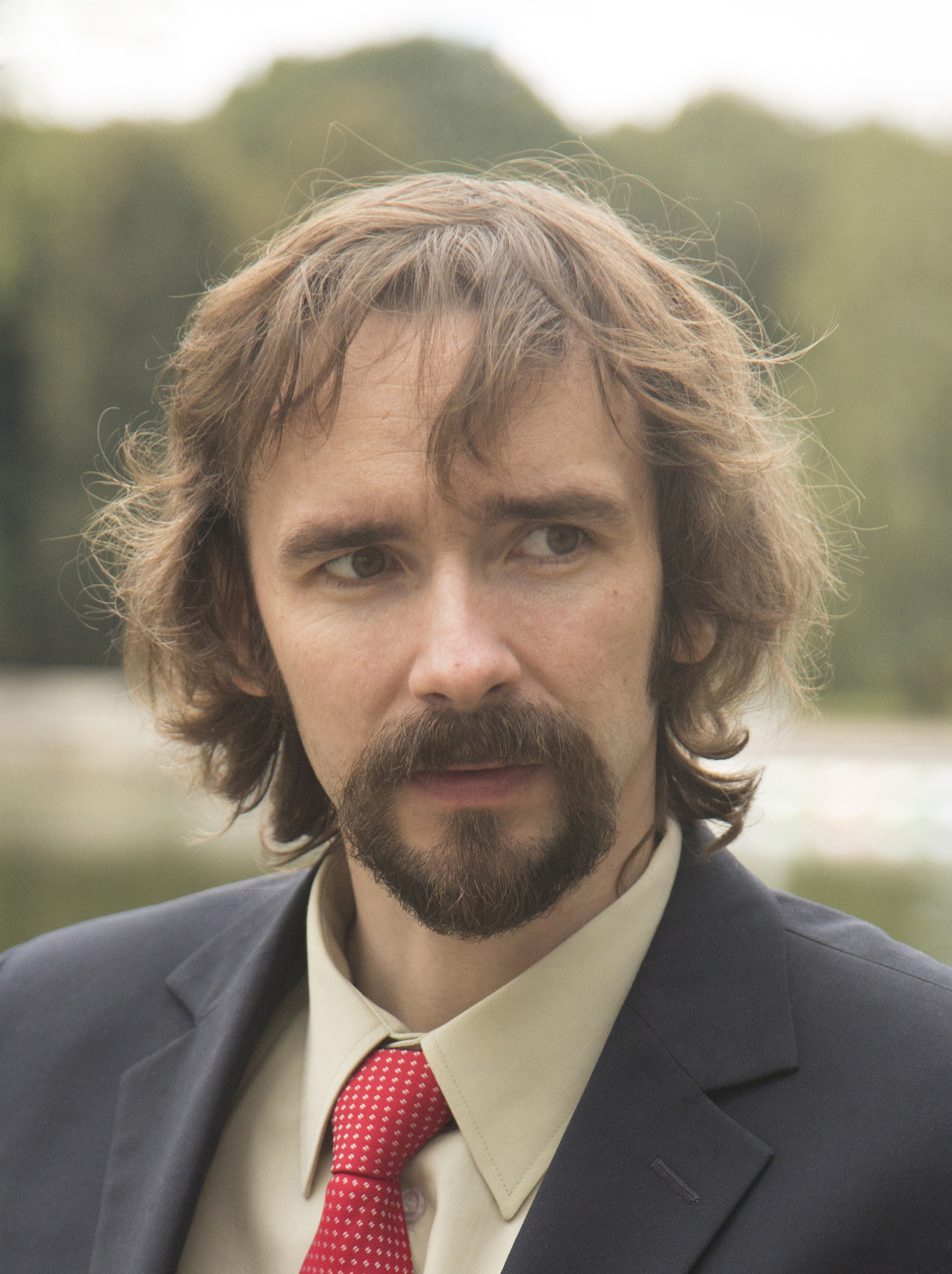
- Siarhei Besarab, 2016
- Born: Novogrudok, Byelorussian SSR, Soviet Union
- Citizenship: Belarusian
- Education: Belarusian State University
- Occupations: Scientist; Chemist; Inventor; Civil activist; Futurologist
- Employers: National Academy of Sciences of Belarus (2010-2020); Global Catastrophic Risk Institute (2025)
- Known for: Notable Belarusian science communicator; CBRN safety and nuclear issues expert, known for extensive media engagement and public outreach; Public criticism of the Astravets Nuclear Power Plant’s safety systems; Highlighting political repression in the Belarusian scientific community; Advocacy for academic freedom and human rights in Belarus
- Call sign: EU1AEY
- Siarhei Besarab's voice sample in Belarusian For Wikipedia:Voice intro project
- Website: https://steanlab.github.io

Siarhei Besarab (Belarusian pronunciation: [ˈsʲargej bʲesɐˈrab] (Note: Belarusian: Сярге́й Васіле́віч Бесара́б, romanized: Siarhei Vasilevič Besarab;Russian: Серге́й Васи́льевич Бесара́б, romanized: Sergey Vasilyevich Besarab; Łacinka: Siarhiej Vasilievič Biesarab; Belarusian Arabic alphabet: "ثَرْهَيْ وَثِلَوِچْ بَصَرَبْ'")) is a Belarusian chemist, civil activist, and science communicator known for his contributions to popularizing science in the fields of radioactivity, nuclear safety, and environmental protection. A specialist in surface science, he formerly worked as a researcher at the National Academy of Sciences of Belarus.

Following the 2020 Belarusian protests, Besarab was dismissed from his academic position. He subsequently became a prominent critic of the safety protocols at the Astravets Nuclear Power Plant and published analyses regarding the deployment of Russian tactical nuclear weapons in Belarus. In June 2023, citing political persecution and facing charges from the Belarusian KGB, he left the country for the European Union

== Early life and education ==
Siarhei Besarab was born in 1984 in the city of Novogrudok in the Grodno Region of western Belarus. He graduated with honors from Secondary School No. 3 in Novogrudok, where he won several awards at regional and national chemistry olympiads during his school years. In recognition of his academic performance in chemistry, Besarab received a local student distinction which included the ceremonial wearing of the academic gown belonging to Boris Kit, a rocket scientist originally from the region.

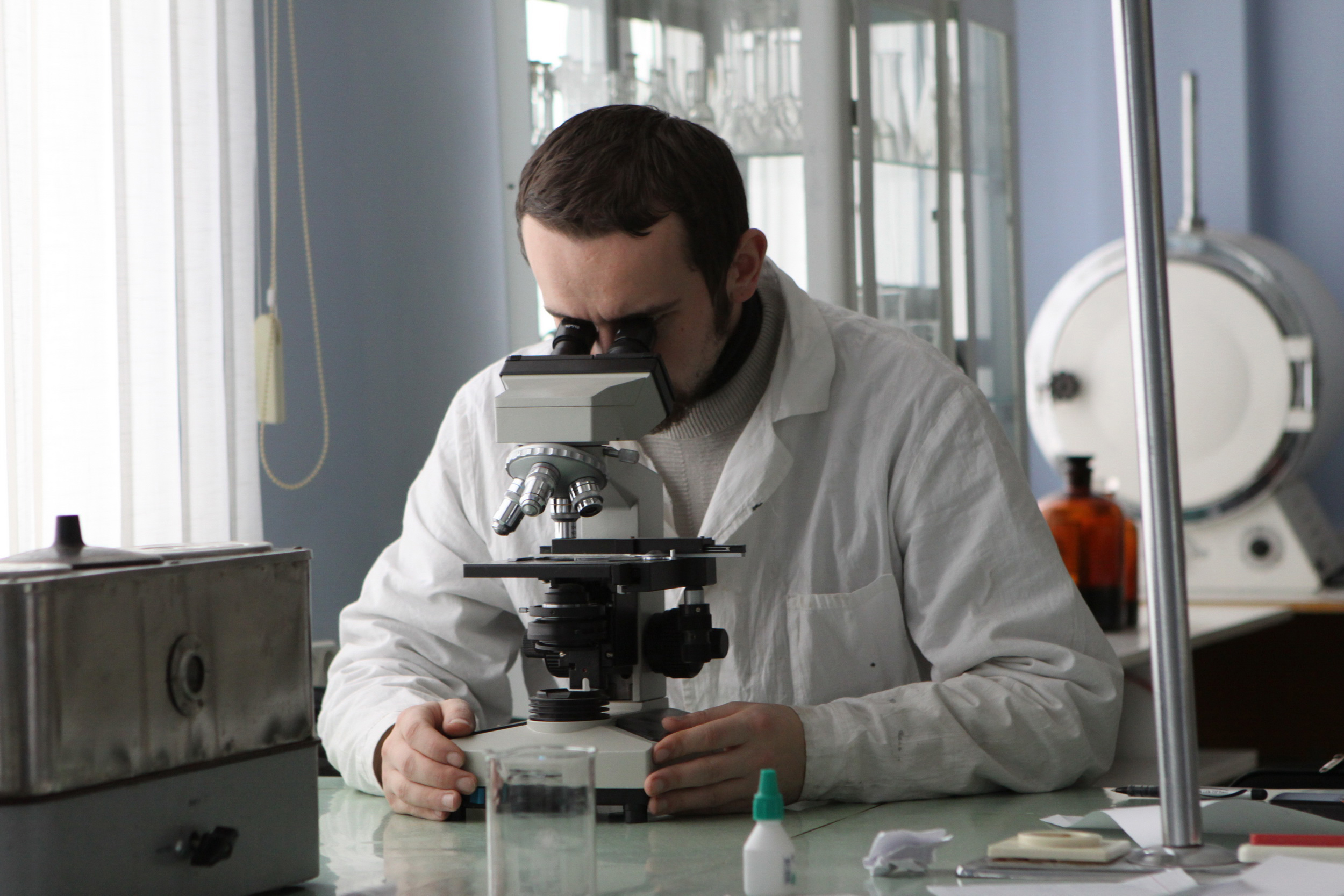
Siarhei Besarab during a laboratory microbiology session at the Faculty of Chemistry Belarusian State University (2008)

Besarab received his Bachelor of Science from the Department of Radiation Chemistry and Pharmaceutical Technologies, Faculty of Chemistry, Belarusian State University, where he conducted research on radiation-induced free radicals under the supervision of Professor Oleg Shadyro, a leading specialist in the study of radiation effects.

He earned his master's degree in chemistry at the University of National Academy of Sciences of Belarus (NASB). His master's research was supervised by Alexander Tretyak, a Belarusian specialist in glass chemistry and functional glass materials. Following his master's studies, Besarab conducted doctoral research in surface science under the guidance of academician Vladimir Komarov at the Institute of General and Inorganic Chemistry at NASB. Komarov is recognized as a leading Belarusian chemist and founder of the national school of adsorption science.

During his secondary school and university years, Besarab developed an interest in meteoritics and meteorite hunting. He worked as an analytical chemist in a team involved in commercial meteorite search expeditions, where he was responsible for identifying recovered materials.

== Career ==
=== Scientific research ===
Since 2010, Besarab has worked as a research scientist in the Laboratory of Adsorbents and Adsorption Processes at the Institute of General and Inorganic Chemistry at NASB, and focusing on inorganic porous materials, effective adsorbents, and new catalysts. Holder of 12 patents, his research ranked among the top 100 in Belarusian fundamental and applied sciences from 2011 to 2015 and earned him two prizes in the Republican Scientific Research Competition (2009, 2011). In 2016, he won the Belarusian segment of the Skolkovo Startup Tour for a mercury fume purification device and contributed to developing polymer hydrogels and additive technologies in cardiac surgery as a scientific advisor at the Republican Scientific and Practical Center of Pediatric Surgery. Additionally, he organized Belarus's first scientific hackathon, SciHackathon, in 2017.

=== Science communication ===
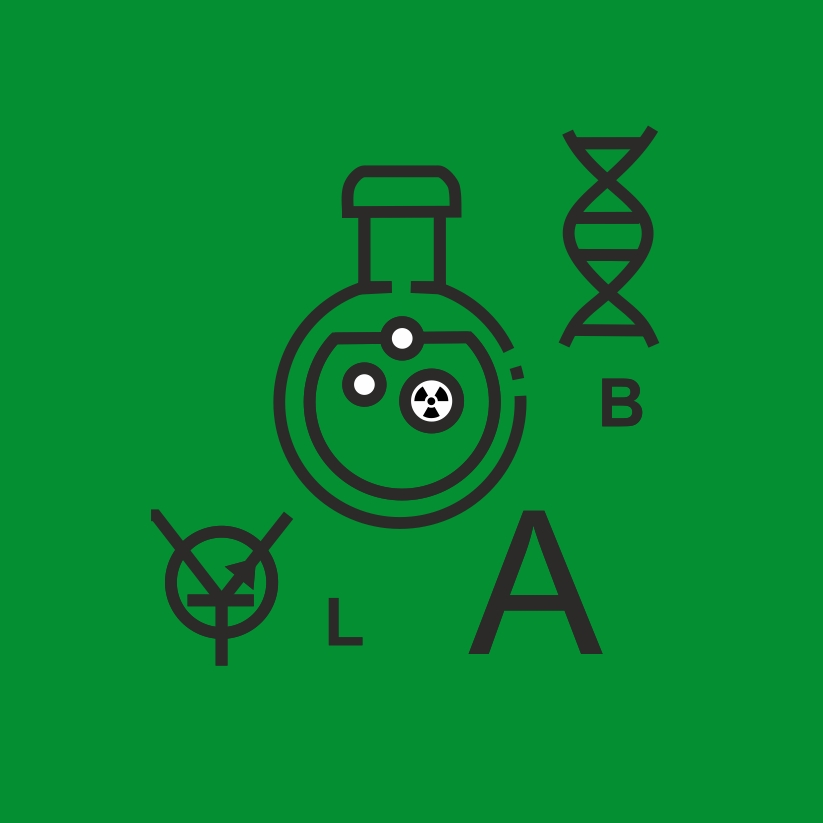
Logo of LAB-66, a science blog managed by Siarhei Besarab

Siarhei Besarab has made contributions to science communication as a journalist and educator. Since 2019, he has managed LAB-66, the largest Belarusian science popularization channel on Telegram, with over 19,000 readers, focusing on chemistry, civil safety, and radiological protection. The blog's analytical articles have been widely reprinted in Belarusian and Ukrainian media, and its content has supported investigative journalism, such as that by the OSINT project Belarusian Hajun.

As a futurologist, Besarab has published articles and forecasts on artificial intelligence, focusing in particular on the ethical, social, and security risks of advanced AI systems. He is also a research collaborator at the Global Catastrophic Risk Institute (GCRI), where he contributes expert insights on global risks and future challenges.

He has also produced forecasts on the development of emerging technologies, including synthetic biology and energy innovation, publishing his analyses in Belarusian independent media such as Belsat and TUT.by. In March 2026, Besarab debuted as a television presenter, launching his own weekly science and futurology segment on the independent television channel Belsat TV. The segment, broadcast as part of the morning show Ranitsa z Belsatam (Morning with Belsat), focuses on the critical analysis of emerging technologies, bioethics, and techno-social forecasting.

Besarab is also active as a climate science communicator, regularly publishing analytical articles on the impact of climate change in Belarus and Eastern Europe. He is recognized for raising public awareness about climate-related risks, infrastructure vulnerabilities, and adaptation strategies in the region. In 2025, he received the Green Award Prize for producing some of the best environmental content in the country, including his analysis of climate anomalies in Belarus and articles focusing on local adaptation strategies.

Besarab also champions alternative food sources, such as insect protein, further advancing science literacy.

== Public activities and civil activism ==
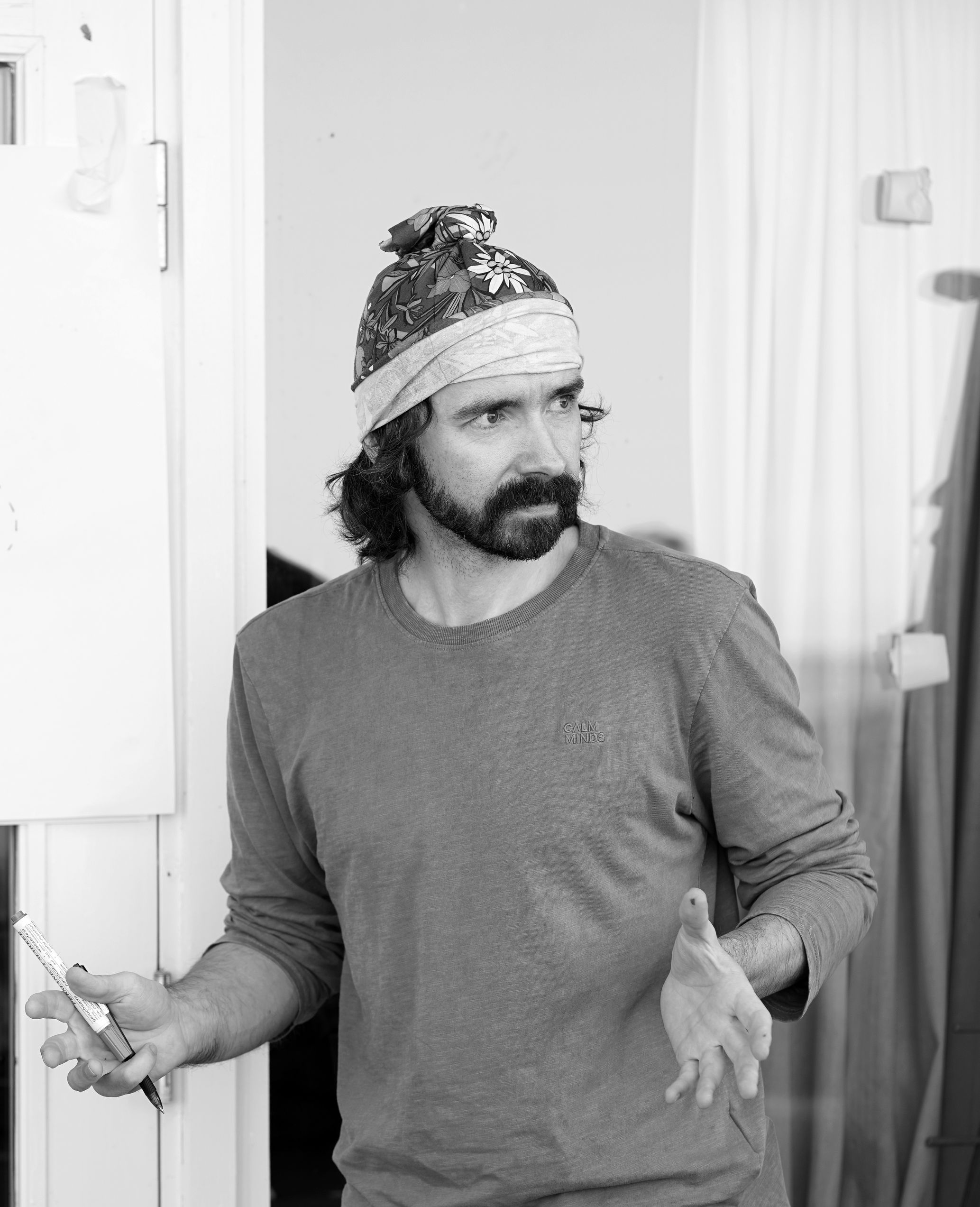
Siarhei Besarab speaking at the Vialiki Voz Conference (2025) in Pärnumaa, Estonia

In 2020, he issued a scientific rebuttal to accusations against civil activist Stsiapan Latypau, debunking claims of a plot to poison law enforcement with agricultural chemicals. He also contributed to an appeal by Belarusian scientists condemning state violence following the contested presidential election, actions that led to his dismissal from the Institute of General and Inorganic Chemistry and a professional ban. His inclusion in the list of repressed Belarusian scientists prompted the scientific community to publish The Scientists’ Open Letter Against Repressions, signed by over 800 academics.

In response to ongoing repression, Besarab co-founded the Belarusian Scientific Solidarity Fund to support persecuted scholars. He further opposed the Russian invasion of Ukraine by publishing an open letter on behalf of the Belarusian scientific community, despite backlash from the NASB. As part of the Until All Are Free campaign, he became an advocate for political prisoner Artsiom Bayarski, a chemistry student targeted for his involvement in post-election protests.

As a public defender of academic freedom Besarab has consistently highlighted issues in Belarusian science, such as censorship, lack of academic freedom, and opaque funding practices. His data-driven initiatives include mapping the repression of Belarusian citizens and scientists, producing analyses like the "map of Belarusian extremism" and profiles of repressed academics. Through his activism, Besarab remains a vocal proponent of transparency and reform in science policy and education.

In October 2025, Besarab published an analysis disputing allegations that weather balloons drifting into Lithuania were used for smuggling. He argued that such methods were not economically viable and characterized the objects as educational tools.

In early 2026, Besarab published a report analyzing the arrest of Belarusian amateur radio operators on treason charges. He argued that the equipment cited by authorities was technically incapable of the alleged espionage. This analysis attracted international attention to the crackdown, with coverage by technology outlets such as 404 Media and Boing Boing, which highlighted the suppression of technical hobbyist communities in Belarus. The report was also circulated by international radio organizations, including the French Union of Radio Amateurs (UFRC). According to Besarab, the crackdown threatens national emergency response capabilities, as radio hobbyists often provide critical communication support during natural disasters.

Besarab is an active advocate for the preservation of national digital heritage and cultural archives. In April 2026, he acted as a key catalyst for one of the most prominent ethical debates regarding hacktivism in Belarusian society. Following a disruptive cyberattack on the electronic catalog of the National Library of Belarus by the hacker collective Cyber Partisans, Besarab publicly condemned the incident. He emphasized that risking the destruction of historical digital catalogs and archives disproportionately harms future generations of scholars rather than affecting the ruling political regime, categorizing such acts as digitally irresponsible. Besarab's vocal opposition, supported by other figures within the Belarusian cultural intelligentsia, triggered a widespread debate in the opposition media concerning the problem of "collateral damage" applied to civil infrastructure. The debate's impact was substantial enough to force radical media commentators who had initially dismissed the academic community's concerns to issue public apologies to the researchers.

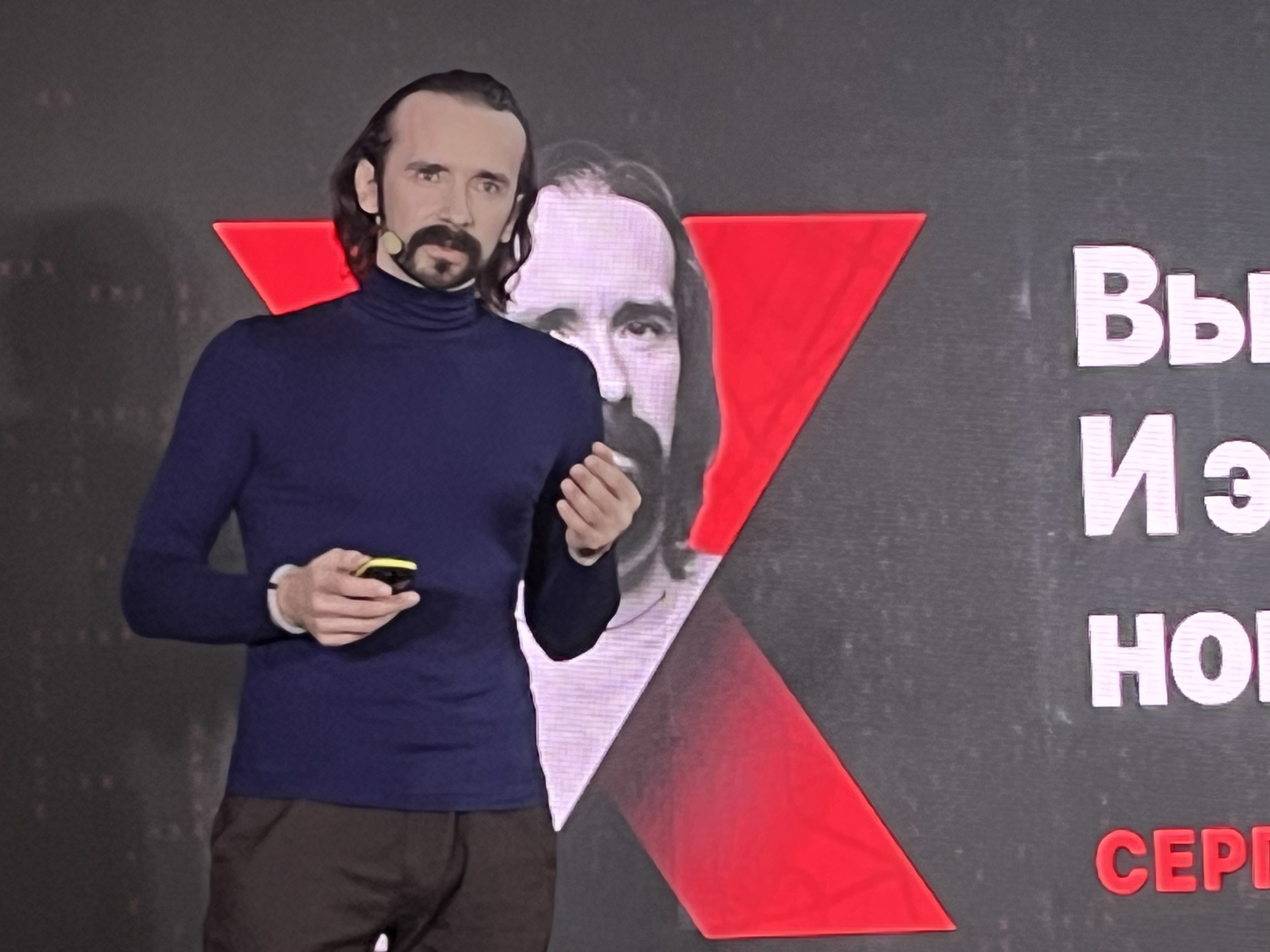
Siarhei Besarab speaking at the TEDxUlicaMinska conference (2026) in Warsaw, Poland

In April 2026, Besarab was an invited speaker at TEDxUlicaMinska, an independently organized TEDx conference held in Warsaw by the Belarusian diaspora. In his talk on radiation safety, he addressed the psychological and societal impacts of radiophobia, arguing that an objective understanding of radiation physics and basic scientific literacy are the most effective tools to combat irrational fear of modern technological risks.

=== Technical critique of the nuclear waste repository project ===
In 2025–2026, independent media highlighted Besarab as a leading scientific expert assessing Belarus's radiation safety policies. Following plans to build a National Radioactive Waste Repository for the BelNPP, Besarab published several critiques focused on the project's engineering and technological shortcomings.

As a radiation chemist, he criticized the choice of a low-cost, near-surface trench repository. Besarab warned of the "bathtub effect", where accumulated water leads to the rapid corrosion of steel containers and inevitable leaks of highly active isotopes (like caesium and strontium) into groundwater. Given these physicochemical risks, he rejected all three government-proposed sites (Astravyets, Mstsislaw District, and the Chernobyl zone) as hydrogeologically unsafe, warning of transboundary contamination. In July 2026, Besarab formalized these warnings by analyzing the project's official Environmental Impact Assessment (EIA), identifying 12 critical technical defects, including non-compliance with IAEA standards and severe containment vulnerabilities.

Additionally, analyzing data with Flagshtok media and the Cyber Partisans group, Besarab questioned the technological competence of BelRAO, the state enterprise managing the facility. He highlighted a severe lack of specialized nuclear engineers in leadership roles, which were largely filled by former security personnel (including KGB). He argued that prioritizing political loyalty over required engineering expertise dramatically increases the risk of environmental disasters.

== Political persecution ==
Besarab gained prominence among Russian and Belarusian speaking readers for his critical analyses of radiation safety. His reputation as a technical expert became particularly notable after the launch of the Astravets Nuclear Power Plant, where he emerged as one of the leading public critics of the station's radiation safety systems.

In spring 2023, amidst heightened geopolitical tensions, Belarusian President Alexander Lukashenko announced plans to bring Russian tactical nuclear weapons into Belarus. Besarab responded by publishing detailed descriptions of potential storage sites for these weapons on his blog and engaging with independent media to discuss the associated risks. This activity placed him in direct conflict with Belarusian authorities, who subsequently labeled all content from his science blog as extremist material (see Classification of extremist materials in Belarus for details).

Facing mounting pressure, Besarab became the target of criminal charges for allegedly causing harm to the state. The Belarusian KGB threatened him with imprisonment, prompting his decision to flee the country and seek political asylum within the European Union to ensure his safety.
