= Astravets Nuclear Power Plant =

Nuclear power plant in Astravyets District, Belarus

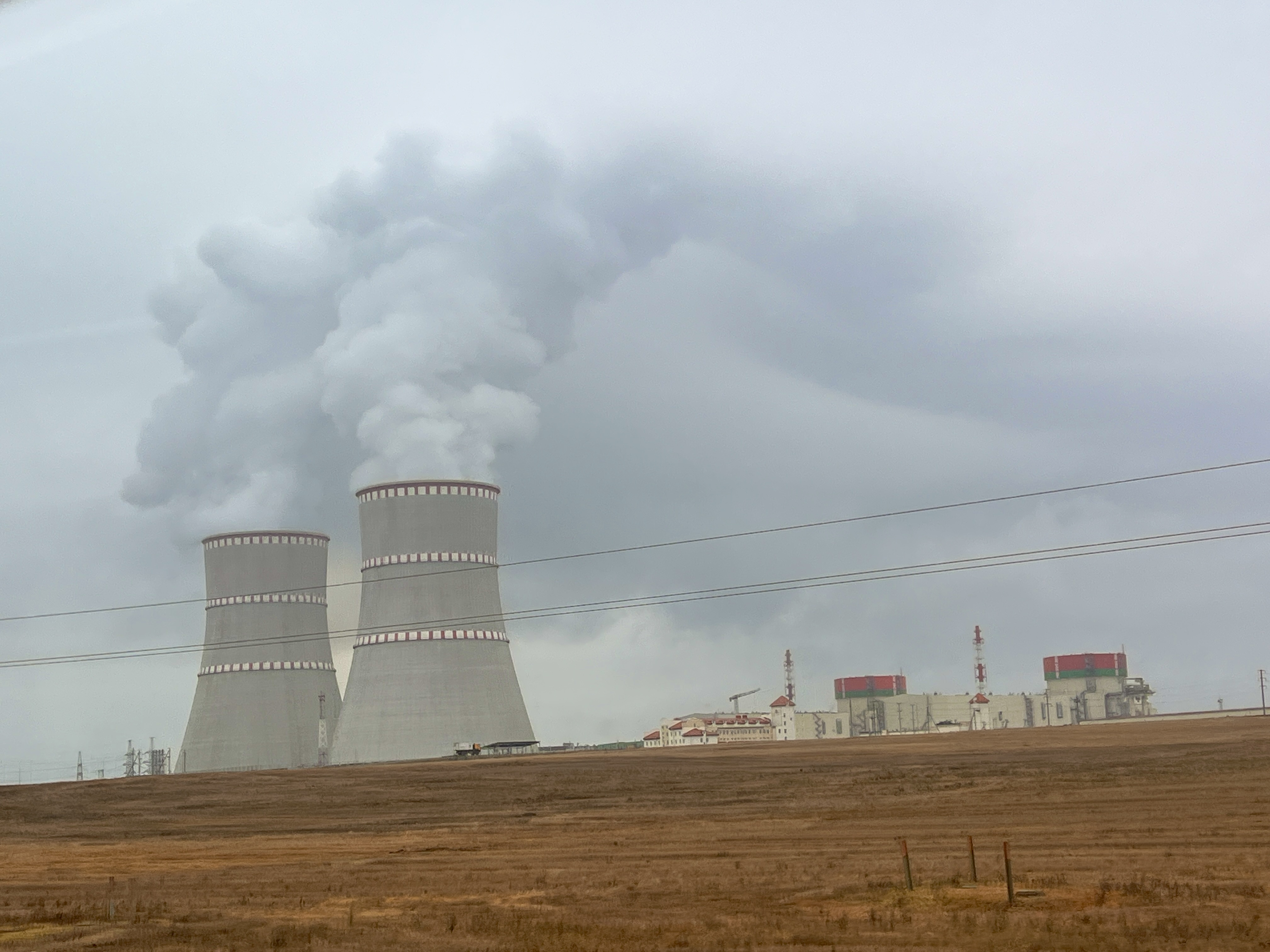
- The plant in November 2025
- Official name: Беларуская атамная электрастанцыя
- Country: Belarus
- Location: Astravyets District, Grodno Region
- Coordinates: 54°45′40″N 26°5′21″E
- Status: Operational
- Construction began: 31 May 2012
- Commission date: 10 June 2021
- Construction cost: Estimated over 1,400 billion rubles (US$23 billion as of 2015); final cost not published
- Owner: Belenergo

Nuclear power station
- Reactor type: VVER-1200
- Reactor supplier: Atomstroyexport
- Cooling towers: 2
- Thermal capacity: 2 × 3,200 MWt

Power generation
- Units operational: 2 × 1,110 MW (net)
- Nameplate capacity: 2,218 MW

External links
- Website: https://www.belaes.by/en/
- Commons: Related media on Commons

The Astravets Nuclear Power Plant (also called the Belarusian Nuclear Power Plant or Ostrovets Nuclear Power Plant) is a nuclear power plant located in the Astravyets District, Grodno Region in north-western Belarus. The power plant is built close to the Belarus-Lithuania border, being 40 kilometres (25 mi) east of the Lithuanian capital of Vilnius. The plant is powered by two 1194-MW VVER-1200 units supplied by Atomstroyexport, the nuclear equipment exporter branch of the Russian nuclear corporation Rosatom. The plant is owned by State Enterprise Belarusian NPP, which in turn is owned by the state-owned operator Belenergo.

Initial plans of the plant were announced in the 1980s, but were suspended after the 1986 Chernobyl disaster. The project was revived by the Belarusian government to have the country become energy-independent due to the Russia-Belarus energy dispute in 2007. The power plant was controversial due to its location being in close proximity with Lithuania and the Lithuanian government has boycotted the power plant and established anti-radiation safety measures with its citizens. Construction of the first unit started on 8 November 2013 and the second on 27 April 2014. The plant entered commercial operation with Atomstroyexport transferring the first unit to Belenergo on 10 June 2021, becoming the first VVER-1200 unit to operate outside Russia.

== History ==
=== Planning ===
In the 1980s there were plans to build a nuclear heating and power plant in Rudensk, about 50 kilometres (31 mi) south of Minsk. Following the Chernobyl nuclear disaster, these plans were halted. The plant was to comprise two VVER-1000 nuclear reactors, designed to provide both electricity and heat for the city of Minsk. The reactors would each have had a power rating of 900 MW net and 940 MW gross capacity.

The nuclear initiative was revitalized after Belarus gained independence from the Soviet Union. On 22 December 1992, Belarus announced its intention to build nuclear power plants and started a program to examine 15 possible sites. It was foreseen that the first unit of 500-600 MW would be commissioned by 2005, and additional units with a combined capacity of 1,000 MW by 2005 and 2010. However, no decision concerning site or reactor type was made. In 1999, the Government of Belarus adopted a nuclear moratorium, but preparations for the construction of a nuclear power plant were carried on.

On 2 May 2002, Belarusian President Alexander Lukashenko stated that Belarus would not construct a nuclear power plant on its territory, but was interested in purchasing nuclear power from Russia, and in the possibility of constructing a Belarus-owned reactor at the Smolensk nuclear power plant in Russia. However, in mid 2006, the Government of Belarus approved a plan for the construction of an initial 2000 MWe nuclear power plant in the Mahilyow Voblast using pressurized water reactors technology.

After the Russia-Belarus energy dispute in 2007, Lukashenko re-declared that to ensure national energy security, Belarus needed to build its own nuclear power plant. In June 2007, Russia offered a US$2 billion credit line for the purchasing of equipment from Russia's Power Machines Company.

On 12 November 2007, a decree defining the organizations responsible for preparing the construction of the nuclear power plant was signed. The Belarusian Security Council made the decision to construct a nuclear power plant on 15 January 2008. The Nuclear Power Act, covering the design and construction of nuclear facilities, the security, safety, and physical protection of such facilities, and their regulation (and also prohibiting the production of nuclear weapons and other nuclear explosives), was adopted by the House of Representatives of the National Assembly of Belarus on 25 June 2008.

The location of the construction site some 18 kilometres (11 mi) away from Astravyets in Hrodna Voblast, 45 kilometres (28 mi) from Vilnius, Lithuania, was chosen on 20 December 2008. Alternative sites were Chyrvo, Bykhaw , and Kukshynava between Horki and Shkloŭ in Mahilyow Voblast.

In January 2009, it was decided that the nuclear power plant would be built by Atomstroyexport, the nuclear equipment exporter branch of the Russian nuclear corporation Rosatom and the Russian loan was agreed in February 2009. The contract was signed in 2011.

=== Construction ===
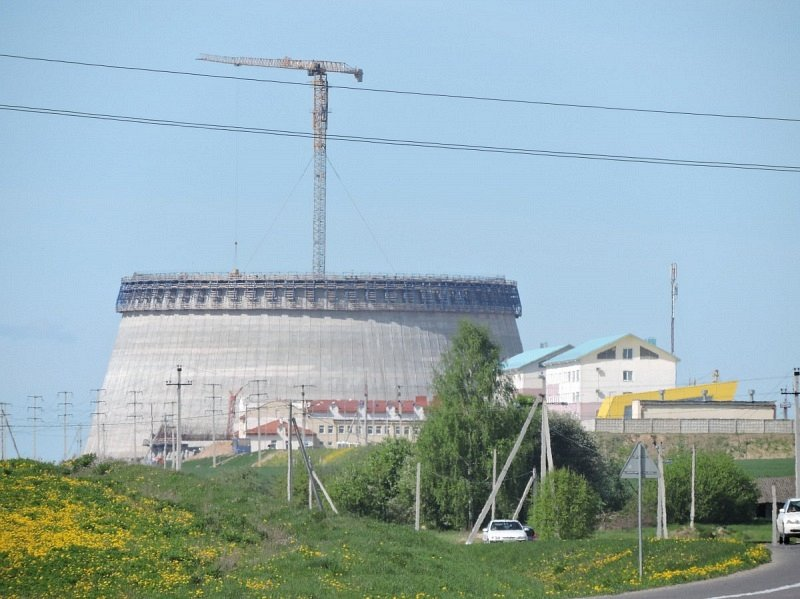
One of the cooling towers under construction in 2015.

In June 2012 the construction of the foundation pit for the nuclear power plant started near the small village of Shulniki in Astravets District, Hrodna Region, some 16 km (10 mi) from the Lithuanian border.

Both in March and April 2013 journalists were not permitted to visit the construction site. In March 2013 Radio Svaboda's correspondent Mikhail Karnevich received official permission to make a report about the construction of the power plant. But when he came to Astravets, he found out that he would not be able to visit the construction site. In April 2013 journalists Ales Barazenka and Nastaśsia Jaūmien were detained in Astravets where they were filming the nuclear power plant construction and were asked an "intelligible explanation to the fact of filming the construction works".

The first nuclear concrete for Unit 1 was poured on 6 November 2013. The construction of the second unit began 8 months later. Construction of each unit was expected to take about five years.

In November 2015, Lithuania informed that there is no possibility to reserve power of the Kruonis Pumped Storage Plant, aside from emergency case, for the Belarusian nuclear power plant.

In February 2016, the 330-tonne, 13-meter high, 4.5 meters diameter, reactor vessel (which was the first reactor produced by Atommash after a 29-year hiatus) was delivered to the site. According to press reports, it took Atommash 840 days (2 years and 4 months) to build the reactor; it was shipped from the plant on 14 October 2015. After being transported by barge over the Tsimlyansk Reservoir, the Volga–Don Canal, the Volga–Baltic Waterway, and the Volkhov River to Novgorod, the reactor was then shipped by a special rail car to the Astravyets railway station near the plant.

=== Commissioning ===
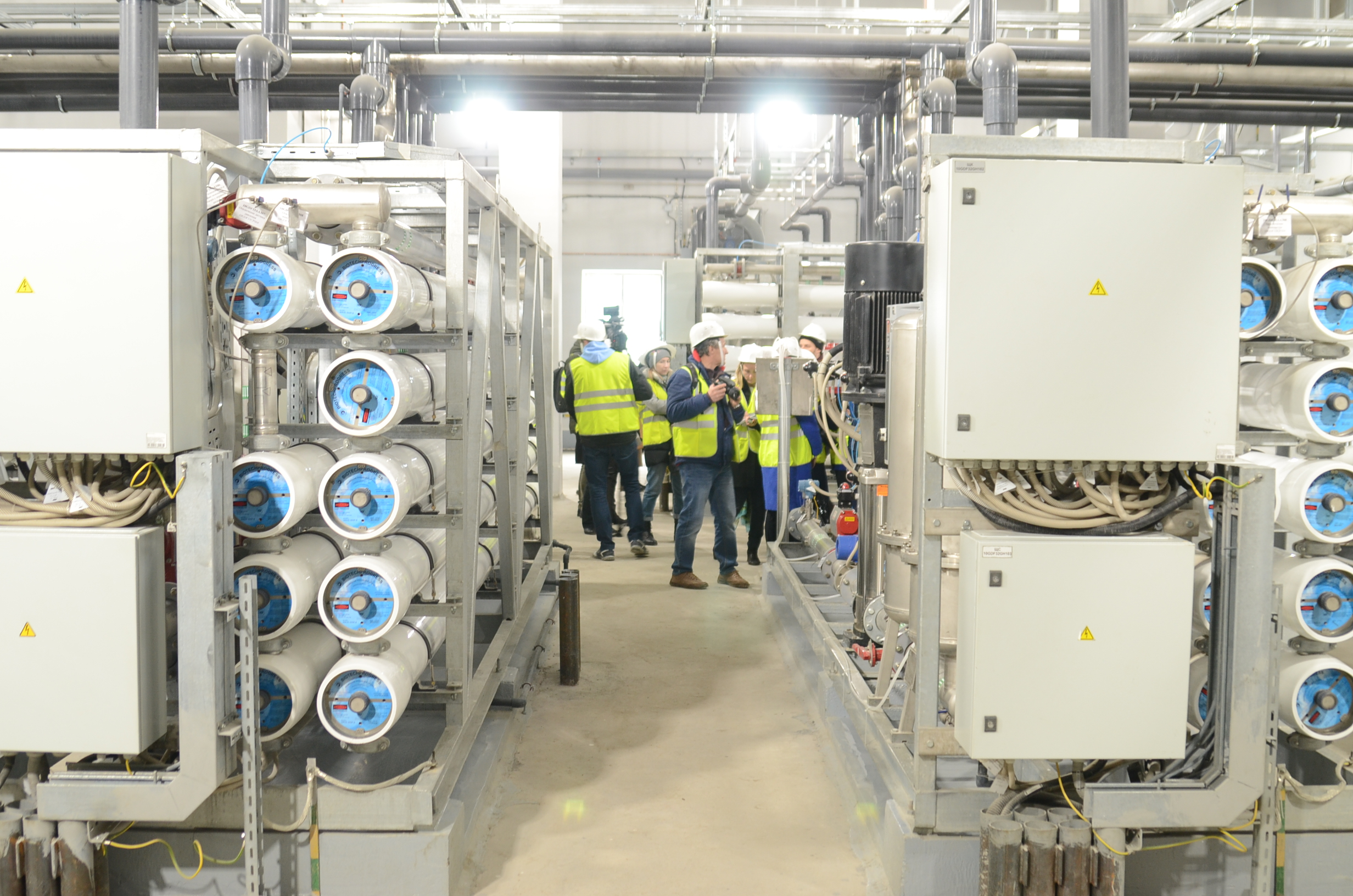
Inside the plant in 2022.

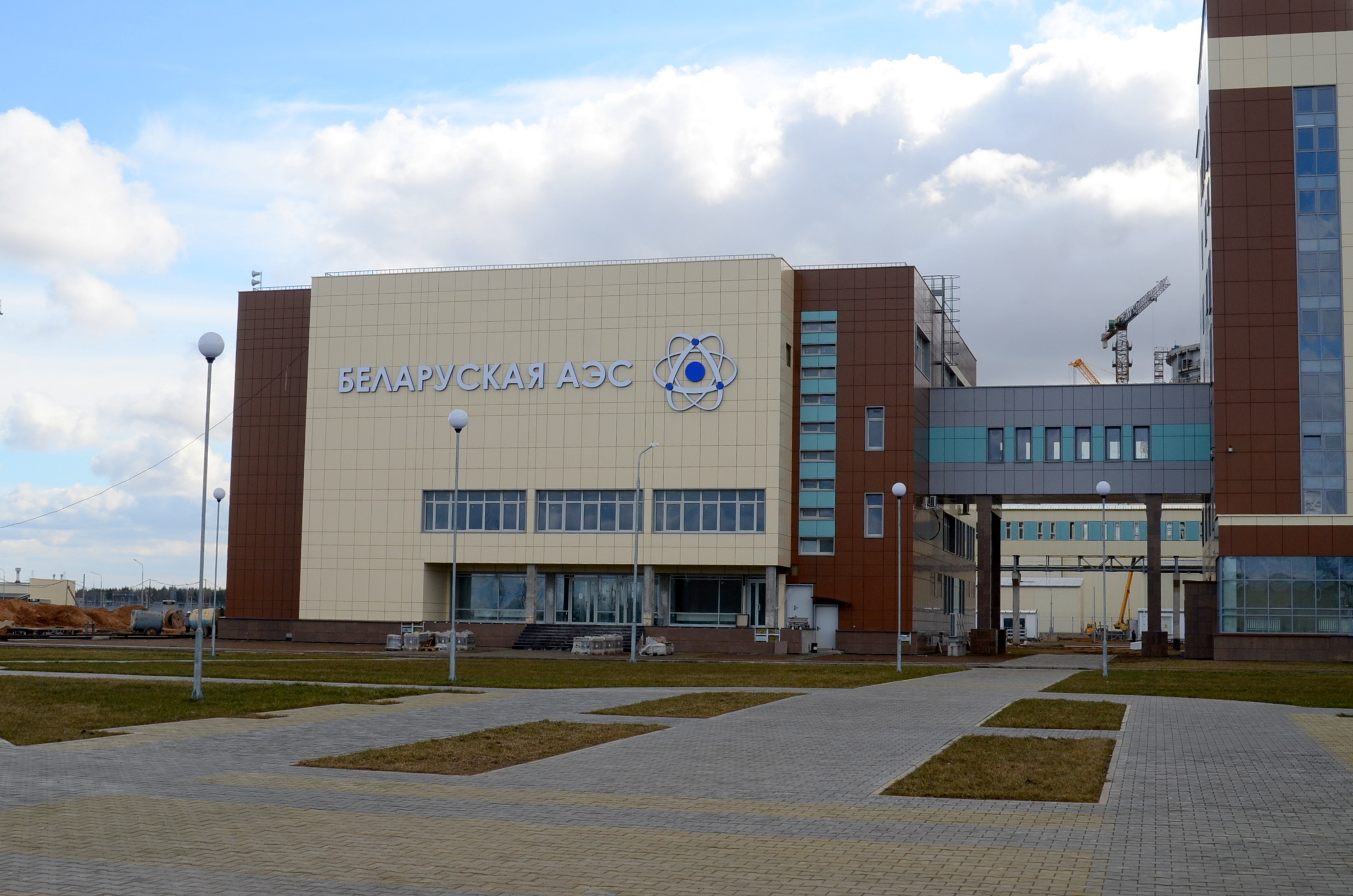
A building on the plant site.

In December 2019, the first unit started hot trials, checking the reactor unit under hot conditions, but with dummy fuel rods placed in the reactor. These tests were completed by April 2020. In February, the plant was inspected by the IAEA. Fuel loading for the first unit started on 7 August. On 11 October, Unit 1 achieved first criticality. The reactor started supplying electricity on 3 November and was officially connected to the grid on 7 November. Testing in January 2021 resulted in disconnection from the grid. Astravets NPP was issued an operating license on 2 June and entered commercial operation eight days later.

Criticality of Unit 2 was first announced on 26 April 2022. It started supplying electricity in May 2023 and entered commercial operation on 1 November.

The power plant began generating electricity in 2020. In 2024, it had generated 15.7 TWh of electricity, which constituted 14.7% of the Belarus's total energy supply in that year, or 35.8% of the country's electricity generation.

Electricity generation in Belarus, TWh
	2020	2021	2022	2023	2024
By the plant	0.3	5.8	4.7	11.7	15.7
Total	38.7	41.2	39.7	41.8	43.9

== Technical description ==
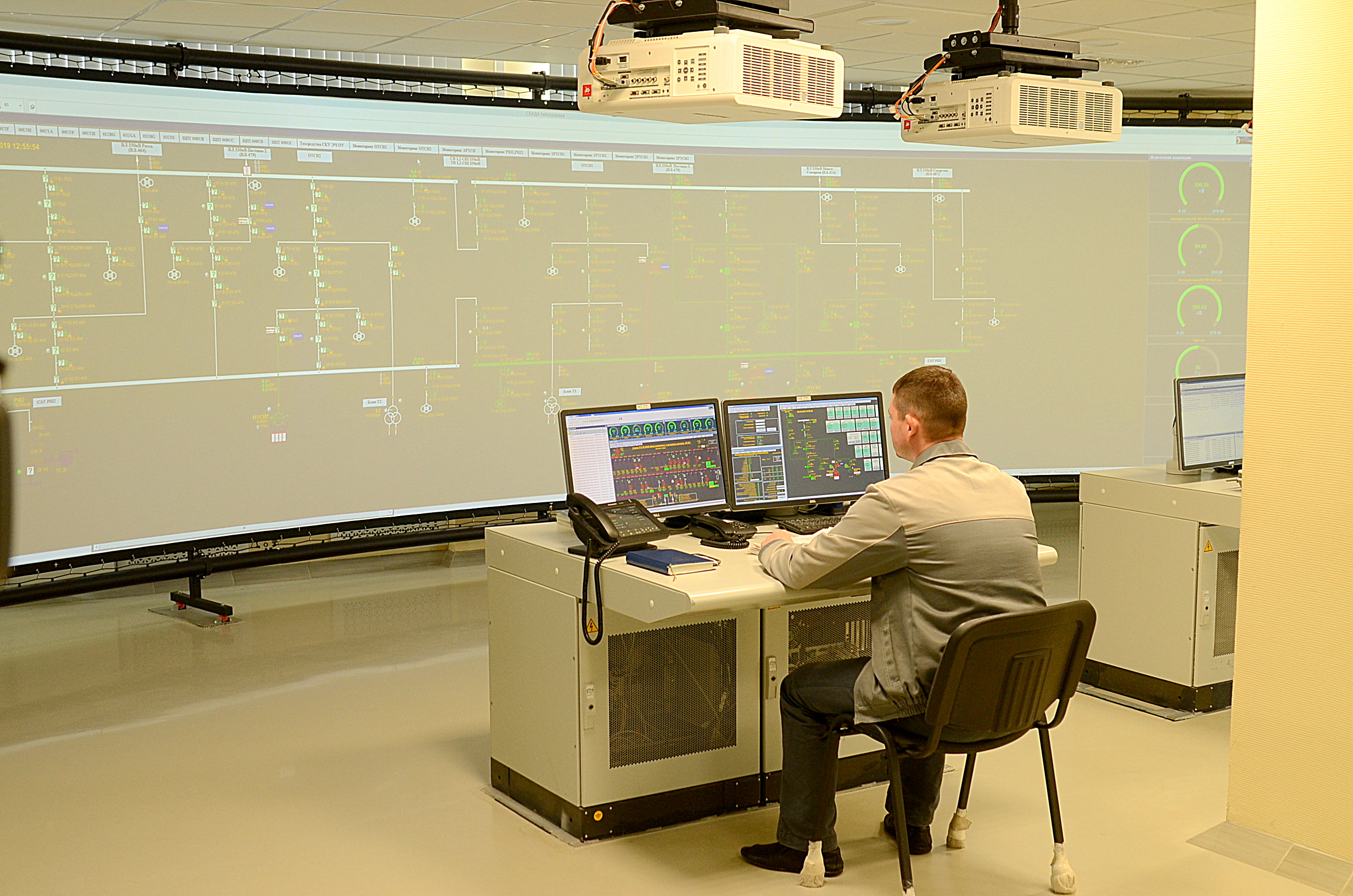
A worker in the control room.

The nuclear power plant costs up to US$11 billion. In addition, there are investments to upgrade the national power grid for power transmission from the nuclear power plant, and the construction of an urban settlement for the power plant's workers. Repayment of the $10 billion loan would start no later than April 2021. Half the loan was at a fixed 5.23% interest rate and the other half at the six-month Libor dollar rate plus 1.83%. In 2020 Belarus requested an extension of the repayment period from 25 to 35 years.

The preparation, design and exploration works were overseen by a Directorate for the Construction of a Nuclear Power Plant, established under the Ministry of Energy. The Nuclear and Radiation Safety Department, part of the Emergencies Ministry, is acting as the state nuclear regulator and licensing authority. Scientific support for the project is provided by the United Power & Nuclear Research Institute Sosny of the National Academy of Sciences of Belarus. The state-owned power engineering industry research and design institute Belnipienergoprom was the general designer of the plant and operates as the project management company, negotiating and signing contracts with suppliers, carrying out feasibility studies and preparing tender documents. Yelena Mironova is the Head of the project management service.

Atomstroyexport was the contractor and supplier of the III generation VVER-1200 type reactors (AES-2006 model). The first two reactors have the combined capacity of around 2400 MW. Earlier proposals envisaged that two additional reactors will be built by 2025. After the first two units were connected to grid in 2021 and 2023, Belarusian government is expected to officially decide to go ahead with proceedings to construct a third unit in 2026, after preliminary decision has been made in november 2025. Atomstroyexport is again expected to supply the plant with the same VVER-1200 reactor (as the two already operating) for unit 3.

Unit	Type	Capacity	Construction start	Operation start	Notes
Belarusian 1	AES-2006	1194 MW	8 November 2013	10 June 2021	
Belarusian 2	AES-2006	1194 MW	27 April 2014	13 May 2023	

== Opposition ==
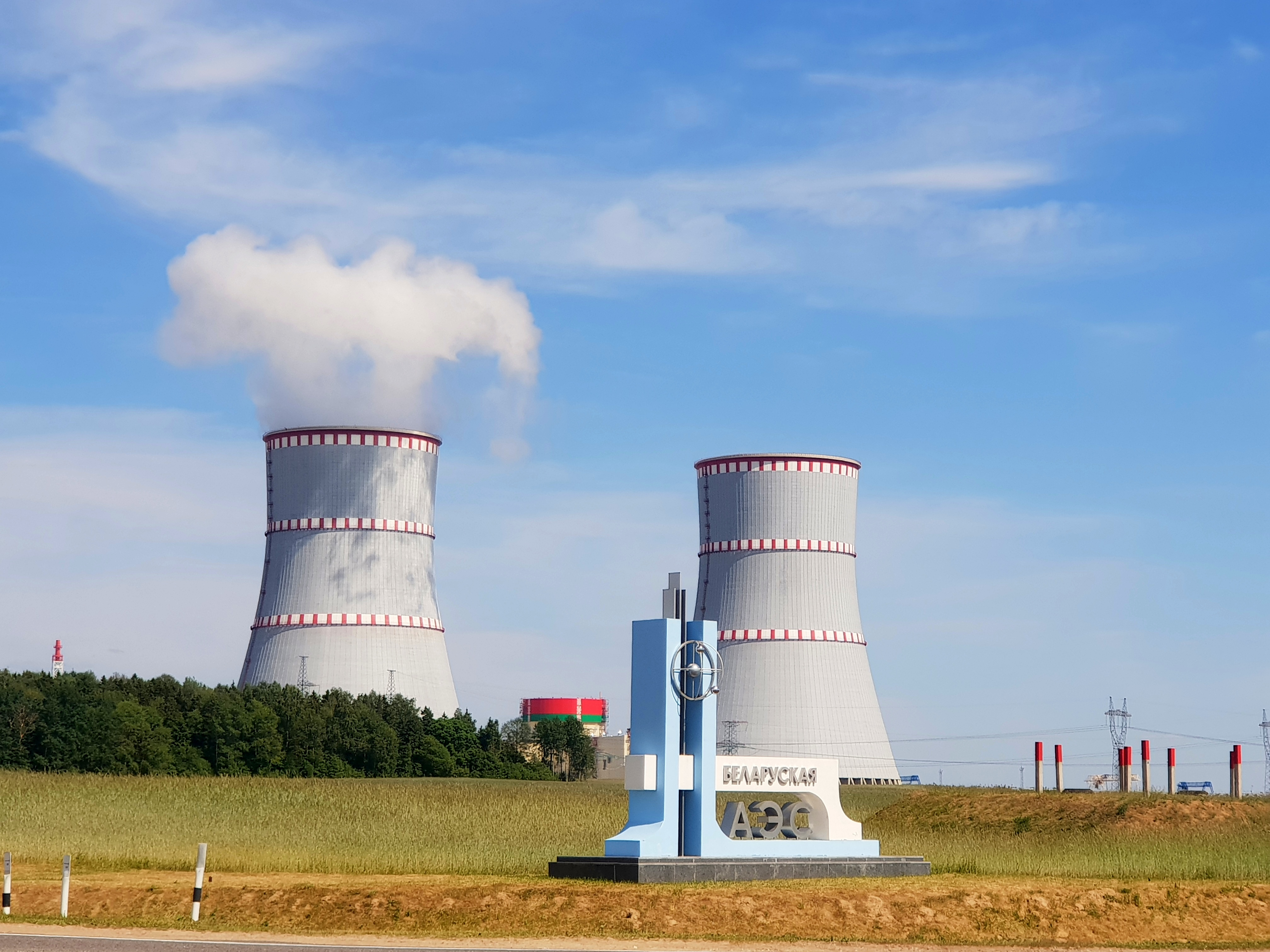
The plant in 2023.

The nuclear power plant plans have raised several concerns. In 2008 opposition groups campaigned and collected signatures against the construction of a nuclear power plant in Belarus.

In 2008 young members of the Belarusian People's Front have campaigned against possible Russian involvement in the construction of the plant and urged the Belarusian government to award the contract to build the nuclear power plant to a company based in a country other than Russia.

Also in 2008 a group of Belarusian scientists founded a movement for a nuclear-free Belarus, claiming that the Belarusian government started preparations for the construction of the nuclear power plant before a moratorium adopted in 1999 was expired. The moratorium expired on 14 January 2009.

On 1 July 2009, a Ukrainian NGO sent a complaint to the Implementation Committee of the Espoo Convention alleging numerous violations of the Espoo Convention. In particular, the complaint argues that Belarus is in violation of the requirements of the convention by pre-defining two key alternatives of the nuclear power plant construction – location and no-action alternative, as well as by not establishing an environmental impact assessment procedure that permits public participation.

In December 2009 European ECO Forum Legal Focal Points submitted a complaint to the Compliance Committee of the Aarhus Convention challenging the legality of NPP construction due to violation of public participation rights provided by the Aarhus Convention.

In 2014, the Espoo Convention parties found that Minsk had not fulfilled some of its obligations in the construction of the NPP.

In 2016, the European Parliamentary Research Service noted the construction of the NPP has sparked international concern, particularly from Lithuania, which has accused Belarus of violating the United Nations' Espoo and Aarhus Conventions. The European Union has also called on Belarus to ensure the highest international safety standards and conduct stress tests for the NPP, in line with its commitments made after the Fukushima nuclear accident.

Lithuania is a critic of the power plant and in 2018 announced its plan to boycott it.

On 7 February 2019, the Meeting of the Parties to the Espoo Convention decided that Belarus had violated the convention in choosing a construction site for its nuclear power plant.

On 11 February 2021, the European Parliament has adopted a resolution expressing serious concerns over the safety of the Ostrovets nuclear plant and has called for the suspension of its commercial launch. The Parliament criticized the hasty commissioning of the plant and the lack of transparency regarding the frequent emergency shutdowns of the reactor and equipment failures.

In December 2021, investigative journalists, citing Cyber Partisans, announced that they had received documents where 18 thousand shortcomings of the first power unit were identified.

One of the independent commentators on the Astravets Nuclear Power Plant is Belarusian chemist and science journalist Siarhei Besarab. After the launch of the plant, Besarab published a number of analytical materials and commentaries in the media, in which he discussed questions related to the plant’s radiation and environmental safety systems, transparency, and compliance with international safety standards, his publications contributed to the public discussion about nuclear safety in Belarus.

== Incidents ==
On 8 April 2016, an excessive amount of concrete for the plant's foundations was poured, resulting in the structural frame breaking down and its components collapsing. According to an unnamed source, it was not the first incident to occur at the site.

On 10 July 2016, the reactor vessel for Unit 1 was accidentally dropped from a height of 4 meters while being moved around the construction site. Rosatom eventually agreed to swap the vessel with one intended for the Kaliningrad Nuclear Power Plant.

On 10 November 2020, the facility's output was suspended after several voltage transformers exploded. Repairs were completed within nine days and the plant was consequently reconnected to the grid.

== See also ==
- List of commercial nuclear reactors
- National Radioactive Waste Repository
