= Adam Maldzis =

Belarusian writer and scholar (1932–2022)

- Адам Мальдзіс
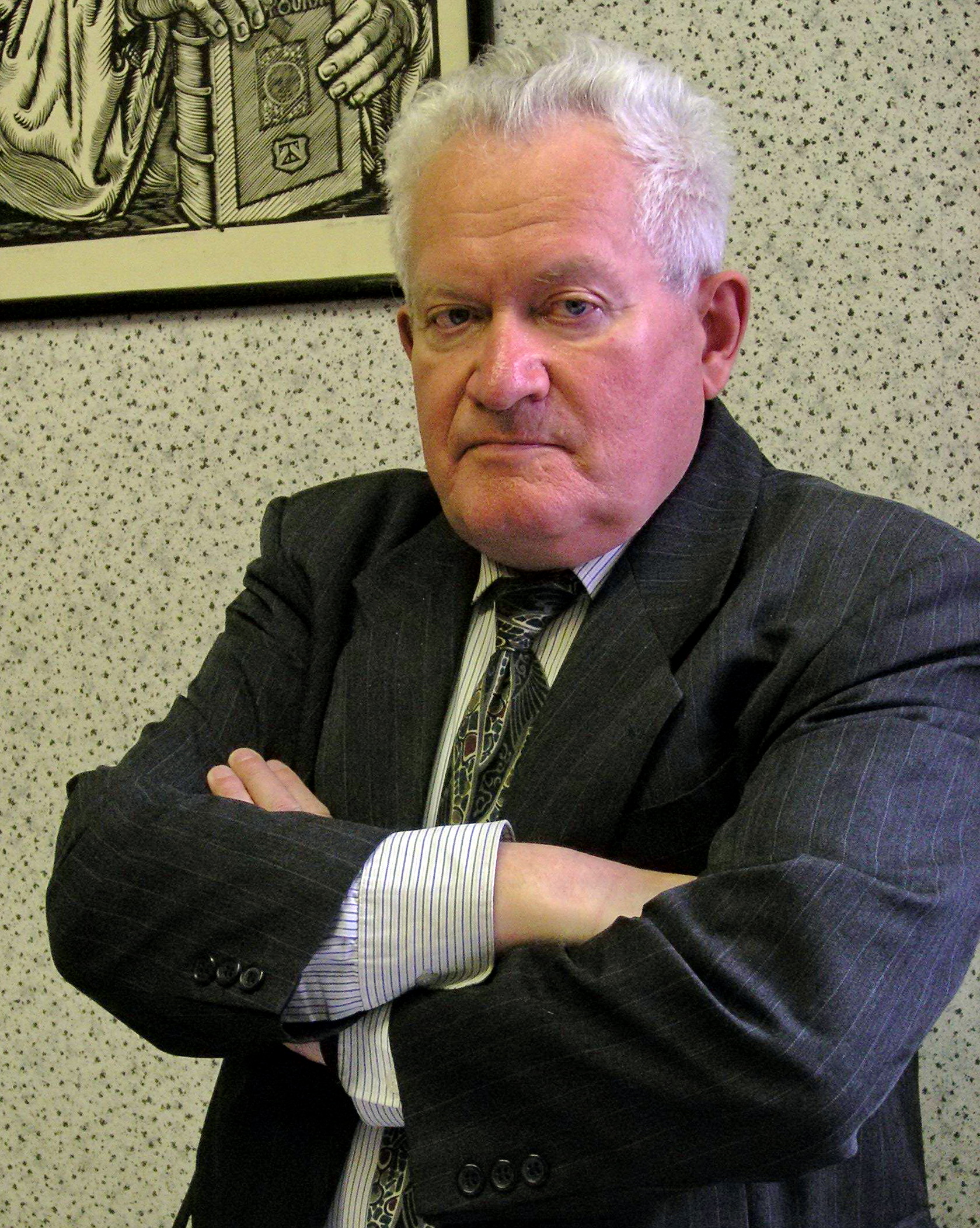
- Adam Maldzis, 2004
- Born: August 7, 1932; Rasoły, Ashmyany District, Poland (now in Astraviec District, Belarus)
- Died: January 3, 2022 (aged 89)
- Education: Doctor of Philology
- Alma mater: Belarusian State University
- Occupations: Historian, literary critic, author and journalist
- Employer: the Institute of Literature of the National Academy of Sciences of Belarus
- Awards: Belarusian Democratic Republic 100th Jubilee Medal

Adam Maldzis (Belarusian: Адам Мальдзіс, 7 August 1932 – 3 January 2022) was a Belarusian historian, literary critic, author and journalist. He was described as "a patriarch of Belarusian humanities", "an excellent connoisseur of literature" and "a living bridge between Belarus and the scholars of Belarusian studies around the world". He was “the author of unique studies of the Old Belarusian literature”.

== Life and career ==
Maldzis was born in the village of Rasoly, Oszmiany District, Poland (now in Astraviec District of Belarus) – a place on a cross-road of "different influences – national, religious and cultural". At school he began publishing articles in children's periodicals.

He earned a degree in journalism from the Belarusian State University followed by postgraduate studies at the Yanka Kupala Institute of Literature of the Belarusian Academy of Sciences. In 1962–1991, Maldzis worked at the Institute of Literature of the Academy of Sciences of Belarus. His main academic interest and specialism was in Belarusian-Polish and Belarusian-Lithuanian literary connections.

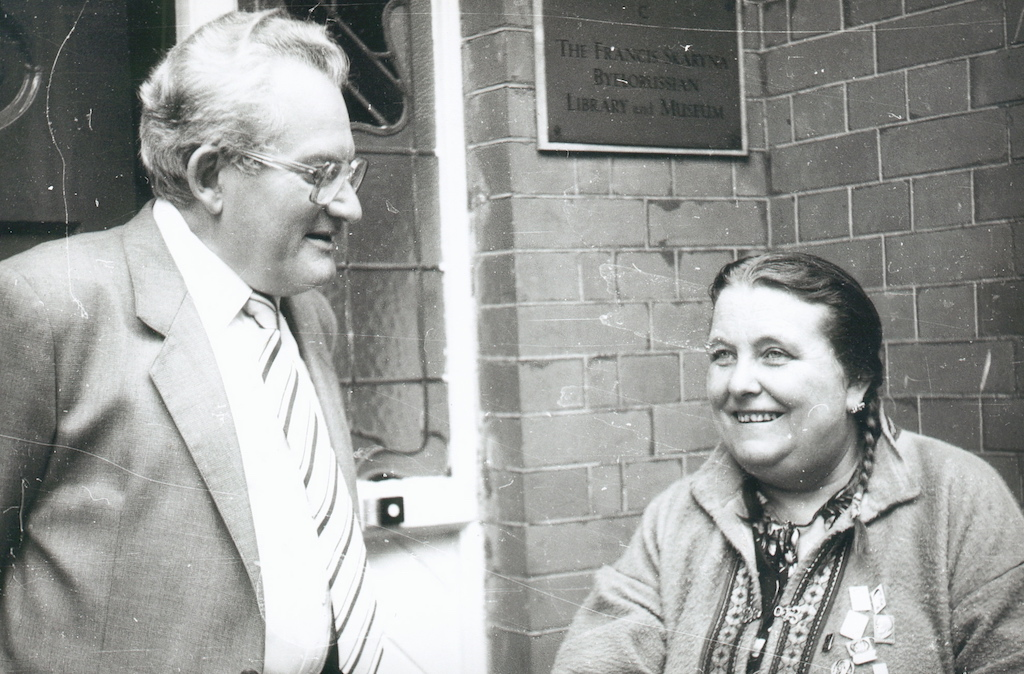
Maldzis and Vera Rich, at the Francis Skaryna Library in London, 1989

Despite strict ideological control in the Soviet Belarus, Maldzis managed to publish a review of Arnold McMillin's A History of Byelorussian Literature from Its Origins to the Present Day (1977) – the first English-language history of Belarusian literature.

In 1982, Maldzis was the first scholar from the Soviet Belarus to spend a considerable amount of time at the Belarusian Library in London working with the materials unavailable to researchers at home due to censorship.

In 1990, he made a public statement – the first in the BSSR – calling for the acknowledgement of the important and positive role of the Uniate Church in the history of Belarus.

In 1987, Maldzis became the head of the restitution commission of the Belarusian Cultural Fund. In 1991, he founded the International Association of Belarusian Studies. In the same year, he founded the Francis Skaryna National Research and Education Centre; he was its director in 1991–98. Maldzis served on the board of the Association of Belarusians of the World Baćkauščyna (Motherland).

Maldzis died on 3 January 2022, at the age of 89.

== Notable works ==
- A six-volume bibliography of Belarusian literature to which Maldzis “devoted 20 years of [his] life”.
- Review of Prof McMillin’s History of Byelorussian Literature: From Its Origins to The Present Day.
- Francis Skaryna from the glorious city of Polack.
- Творчае пабрацімства: Беларуска-польскія літаратурныя ўзаемасувязі ў XIX ст. Creative [Brotherhood: Belarusian-Polish Literary Relations in the 19th Century], Мінск/ Minsk, 1966.
- Падарожжа ў XIX стагоддзе: 3 гісторыі беларускай літаратуры, мастацтва і культуры. Навукова-папулярныя нарысы [A trip to the ХІХth century. From the history of Belarusian literature, art and culture], Мінск / Minsk, 1969.
- Традыцыі польскага Асветніцтва ў беларускай літаратуры XIX стагоддзя [Traditions of the Polish Enlightenment in the Belarusian literature of the XIX century], Мінск / Minsk, 1972.
- Тры месяцы пошукаў, знаходак і сустрэч [Three months of searches, finds and meetings] // Полымя, [Polymia], 1973, No. 7.
- Таямніцы старажытных сховішчаў [Mysteries of ancient repositories], Мінск / Minsk, 1974.
- Nieznany wiersz białoruski ze zbiorów Kórnickich / A. Maldzis // Pamiętnik biblioteki Kórnickiej [Unknown Belarusian poem from the Kórnik collection] / A. Maldzis // Diary of the Kórnik library.),1978, Zesz. 14, p. 177-180.
- На скрыжаванні славянских традыцый: Літаратура Беларусі пераходнага перыяду: другая палавіна ХVII—ХVIII ст. [At the crossroads of Slavic traditions: Literature of Belarus in transition: the second half of the seventeenth and eighteenth centuries], Мінск / Minsk, 1980.
- Беларусь у люстэрку мемуарнай літаратуры XVIII стагоддзя: Нарысы быту і звычаяў [Belarus in the Mirror of Memoirs of the XVIII Century: Essays on Life and Customs], Мінск / Minsk, 1982.
- Восень пасярод вясны: Аповесць, сатканая з гістарычных матэрыялаў і мясцовых паданняў [Autumn in the middle of spring: A story woven from historical materials and local legends], Мінск / Minsk, Мастац. літ., 1984.
- 3 літаратуразнаўчых вандраванняў: Нарысы, эсэ, дзённікі [From literary travels: Essays, essays, diaries], Мінск / Minsk, 1987.
- Францыск Скарына як прыхільнік збліжэння і ўзаемаразумення людзей і народаў [Francisk Skaryna as a supporter of rapprochement and mutual understanding of peoples and nations], Мінск / Minsk, 1988.
- Жыццё і ўзнясенне Уладзіміра Караткевіча: Партрэт пісьменніка і чалавека [Life and Ascension of Uladzimir Karatkievič], Мінск / Minsk, 1990.
- І ажываюць спадчыны старонкі: Выбр. [And pages of the legacy come to life: Selected], Мінск / Minsk, 1994.
- Як жылі нашы продкі ў XVIII стагоддзі [How our ancestors lived in the XVIII century], Мінск / Minsk, 2001.
- Выбранае / Адам Мальдзіс [Selected/ Adam Maldzis] Уклад. В. Грышкевіч; Прадм. Г. Кісялёў, В. Чамярыцкі. — Мн.: Кнігазбор, 2007. — 464 с. — («Беларускі кнігазбор»: Серыя 2. Гісторыка-літаратурныя помнікі). ISBN 978-985-6824-95-4.
- Белорусские сокровища за рубежом [Belarusian Treasures abroad] /А. И. Мальдис. — Минск: Літаратура і Мастацтва, 2009. — 208 с. : и л. — (Беларусь вчера и сегодня). ISBN 978-985-6720-94-2.
- Даўняя Беларусь. З настальгіяй аб мінулым / [Ancient Belarus. With nostalgia for the past] Адам Мальдзіс, Армэн Сардараў. — Мінск : Літаратура і Мастацтва, 2010. — 165, [2] с. ISBN 978-985-6941-36-1.
- Соотечественики : очерки о белорусах и уроженцах Беларуси, обогативших мировую культуру [Compatriots: essays on Belarusians and natives of Belarus who have enriched world culture]/ Адам Мальдис. — Минск : Издательский дом «Звезда», 2013. — 336 с. (Беларусь вчера и сегодня). ISBN 978-985-7059-85-0.
- Ад Скарыны і Фёдарава — у XXI стагоддзе: зборнік эсэ [From Skaryna and Fedorov - in the XXI century: a collection of essays] / Адам Мальдзіс. — Мінск : Чатыры чвэрці, 2018. — 206, [1] с. ISBN 978-985-581-087-3.
