= Narowlya district =

District of Gomel region, Belarus

Narowlya district Нараўлянскі раён (Belarusian) Наровлянский район (Russian)
- District
- Coat of arms

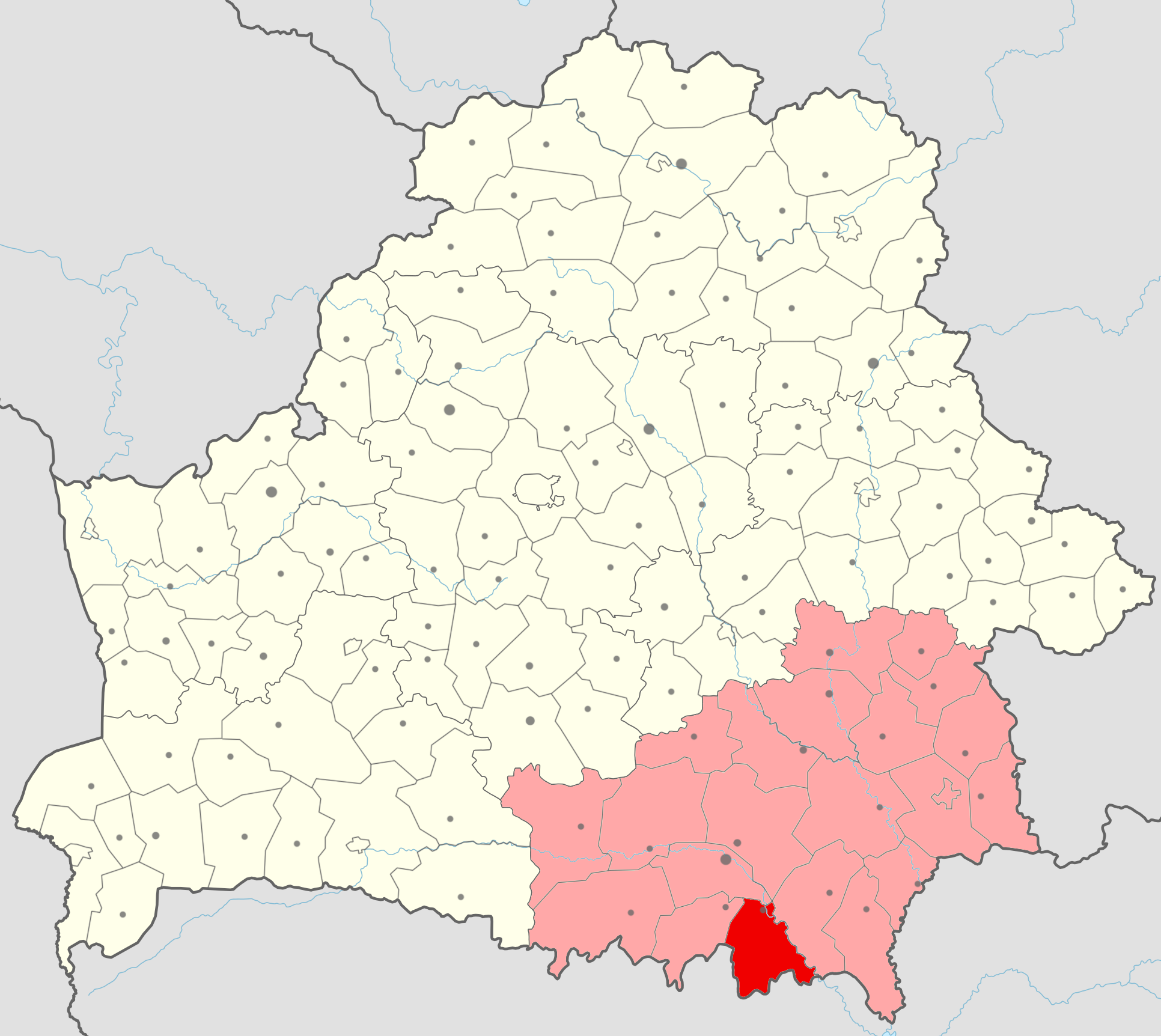
- Location of Narowlya District within Gomel Region in Belarus
- Coordinates: 51°48′N 29°30′E
- Country: Belarus
- Region: Gomel region
- Administrative center: Narowlya

Area
  - Total: 1,588.82 km^{2} (613.45 sq mi)

Population (2024)
  - Total: 10,417
  - Density: 6.5564/km^{2} (16.981/sq mi)
- Time zone: UTC+3 (MSK)
- Website: Official website

Narowlya district or Naroŭlia district (Belarusian: Нараўлянскі раён, romanized: Naraulianski rajon; Russian: Наровлянский район) is a district (raion) of Gomel region in Belarus. Its administrative center is the town of Narowlya. As of 2024, it has a population of 10,417.

== Geography ==
The district includes the town of Narowlya, six rural councils (selsoviets), and several villages. Following the 1986 Chernobyl disaster, it is partially included in the Polesie State Radioecological Reserve.

== See also ==
- Chernobyl Nuclear Power Plant
