= Khoiniki =

Town in Gomel Region, Belarus

Khoiniki Хойнікі (Belarusian) Хойники (Russian)
- Town
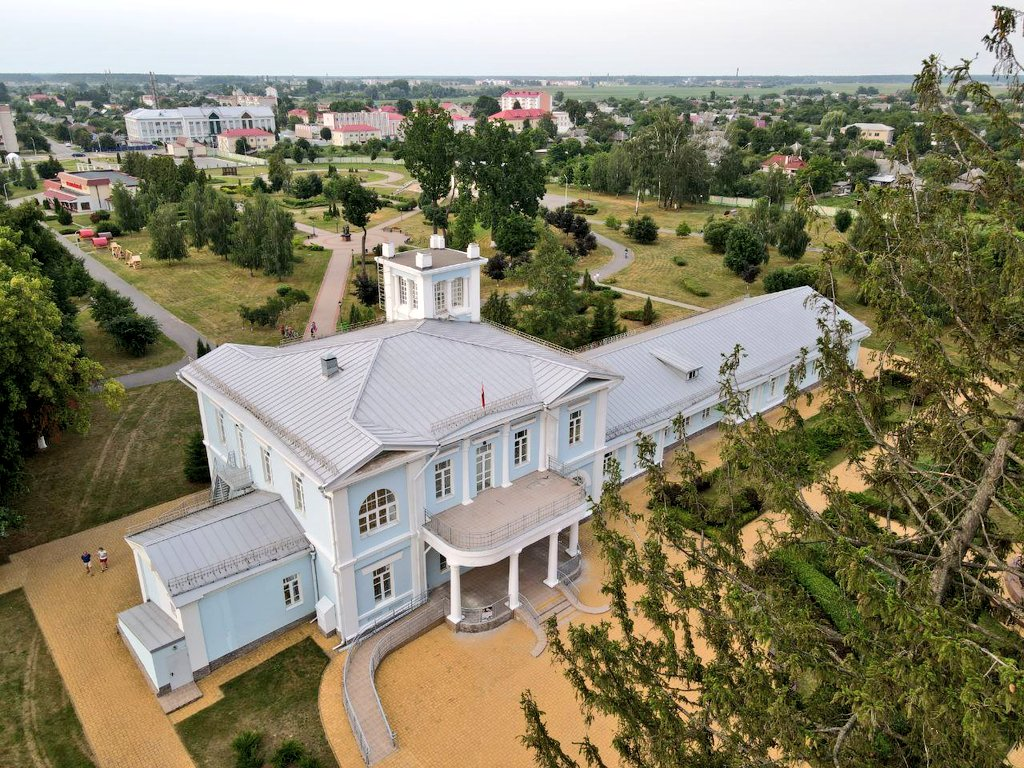
- Local museum

- Flag Coat of arms

- Location within Belarus
- Coordinates: 51°53′21″N 29°57′52″E
- Country: Belarus
- Region: Gomel Region
- District: Khoiniki District
- First mentioned: 1504

Area
  - Total: 20.5 km^{2} (7.9 sq mi)

Population (2025)
  - Total: 13,001
- Time zone: UTC+3 (MSK)
- Postal code: 247600, 247601, 247618, 247622-247624
- Area code: +375 2346
- License plate: 3

Khoiniki (Belarusian: Хойнікі, romanized: Chojniki, IPA: [ˈxɔɪ̯n̪ʲikʲi]; Russian: Хойники, romanized: Khoyniki; Polish: Chojniki) is a town in Gomel Region, Belarus. It serves as the administrative center of Khoiniki District. As of 2025, it has a population of 13,001. It is located in Polesia.

In 1986, the area around Khoiniki experienced heavy radioactive fallout from the Chernobyl accident; however, the city itself was not significantly affected. Today, the town hosts the headquarters of Polesie State Radioecological Reserve and employs over 700 people. The reserve itself is located south of the town in a heavily contaminated area.

== History ==
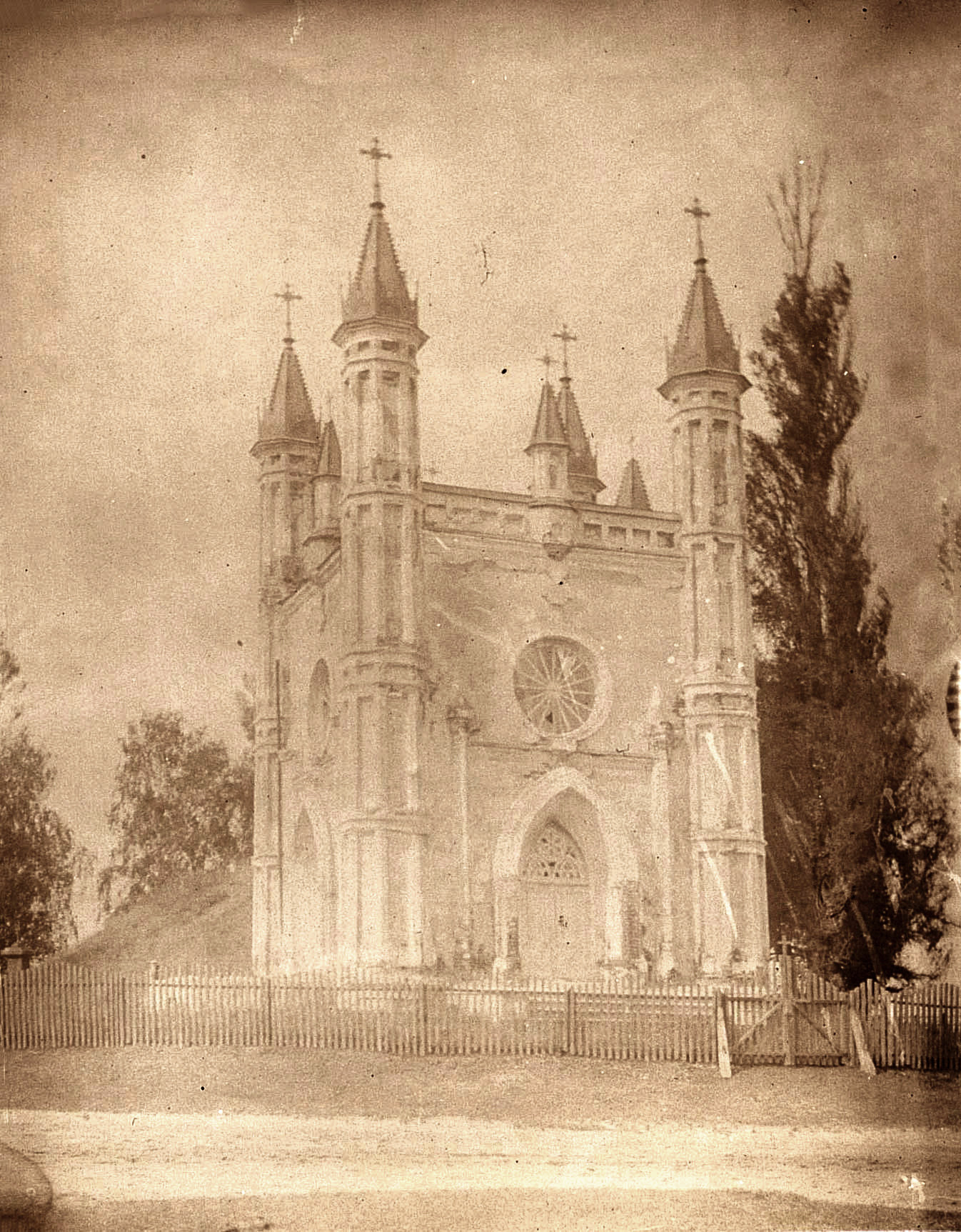
Prozor family burial chapel in c. 1913

According to historical records, Khoiniki was first mentioned in 1504 as a dependency of the Grand Duchy of Lithuania. It was a possession of the Wiśniowiecki, Szujski and Prozor families. It hosted a residence of Voivode of Vitebsk Józef Prozor and oboźny Karol Prozor. Karol Prozor died there. It was incorporated into the Russian Empire in 1793, as a result of the Second Partition of Poland.

In 1897, the city, located in the Pale of Settlement, had a large Jewish community of 1,668 people (62% of the total population).

In 1919, Khoiniki was attached to the Russian Soviet Federative Socialist Republic. It was then transferred in 1927 to the Byelorussian Soviet Socialist Republic. During World War II, Khoiniki was occupied by Nazi Germany from August 25, 1941, to November 23, 1943.

City status was granted to it on November 10, 1967. It was seriously affected in 1986 by the Chernobyl disaster.
