= Polesie State Radioecological Reserve =

Nature reserve in Belarus

- Палескі дзяржаўны радыяцыйна-экалагічны запаведнік (Belarusian); Полесский государственный радиационно-экологический заповедник (Russian)
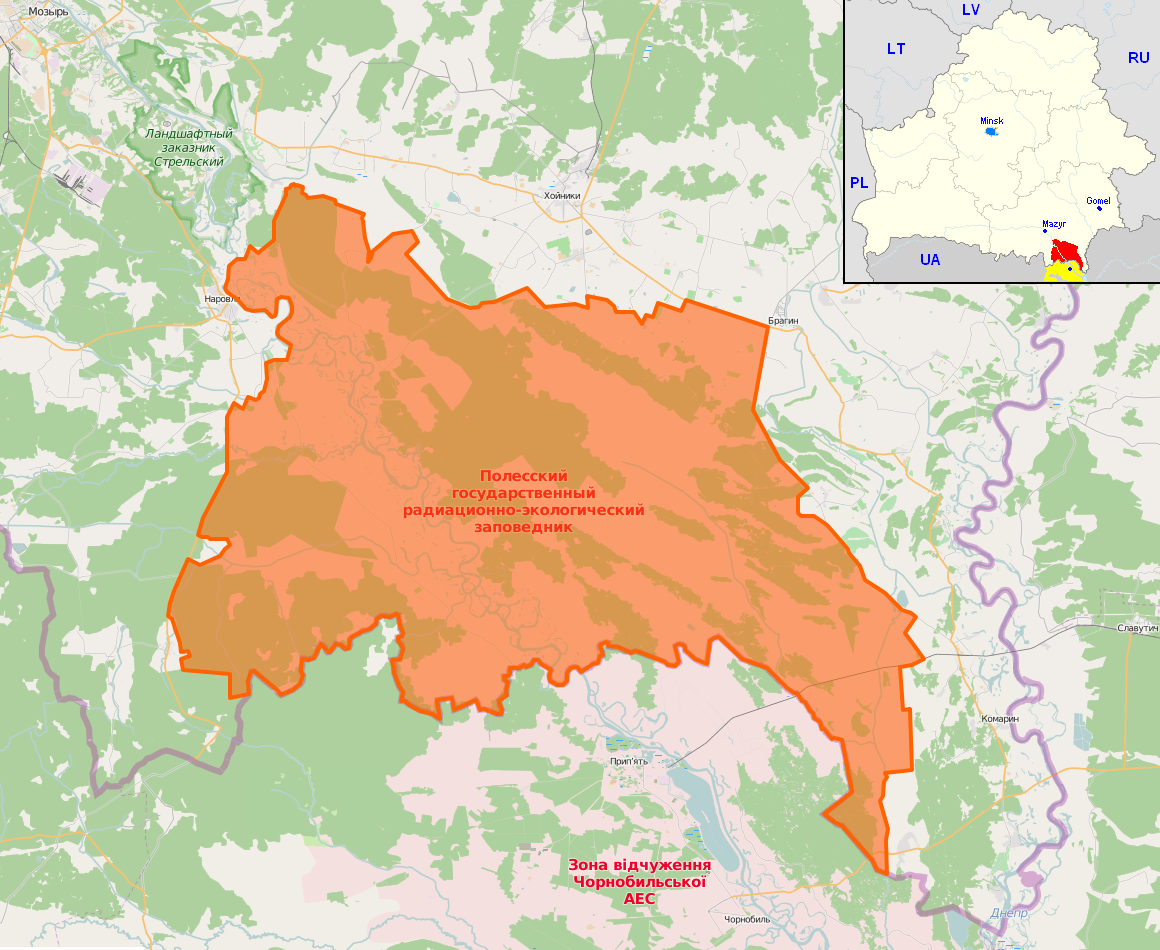
- OSM map of the reserve highlighting some nearby places in the annotations (as Mazyr, Pripyat, the Chernobyl Plant etc). The map in the corner shows its position (red) within Belarus, showing also the Ukrainian, and contiguous, Chernobyl Exclusion Zone (yellow)
- Interactive map of Polesie State Radioecological Reserve
- Location: Belarus
- Nearest city: Brahin, Narowlya, Khoiniki
- Coordinates: 51°39′N 29°59′E
- Area: 2,162 km^{2} (835 sq mi)
- Established: July 18, 1988
- Website: Official website

The Polesie State Radioecological Reserve (PSRER; Belarusian: Палескі дзяржаўны радыяцыйна-экалагічны запаведнік, romanized: Palyeski dzyarzhawny radyyatsyyna-ekalahichny zapavyednik; Russian: Полесский государственный радиационно-экологический заповедник, romanized: Polessky gosudarstvenny radiatsionno-ekologichesky zapovednik) is a radioecological nature reserve in the Polesie region of Belarus, which was created to enclose the territory of Belarus most affected by radioactive fallout from the Chernobyl disaster. The reserve adjoins the Chernobyl Exclusion Zone in Ukraine. The environmental monitoring and countermeasure agency, Bellesrad, oversees the agriculture and forestry in the area.

== History ==
Radiation level in 1996, according to map from CIA handbook

Two years after the Chernobyl disaster, the Belarusian part of the Chernobyl Exclusion Zone was extended to a more highly contaminated area. Then, a closed-to-the-public nature reserve was established in Belarus with a total area of 1,313 km^{2} (507 sq mi). The reserve was established on July 18, 1988. Before the disaster, over 22,000 people lived there in 96 settlements. The population was evacuated after the disaster. In 1993 it was expanded by 849 km^{2} (328 sq mi), making it the largest Belarusian nature reserve and one of the largest in Europe.

== Geography ==
=== Overview ===
The area, located in southern Gomel Region and bordering the Ukrainian Exclusion Zone, includes part of the raions (districts) of Brahin, Khoiniki and Narowlya. It is crossed by the Pripyat River, and the city of Mazyr is 36 km (22 mi) from the northwestern entrance, in Narowlya. The southern strip is crossed by the Chernihiv–Ovruch railway, which passes through the villages of Kaporanka, Kalyban and Pasudava.

=== Abandoned villages ===
The following list shows the abandoned villages included in the reserve. Population refers to the 1959 census. "fam." refers to the number of families evacuated after the 1986 disaster.

Settlement	Pop. (1959)	Fam. (1986)	District	Belarusian	Russian
Aravichy	923	222	Khoiniki	Аравічы	Оревичи
Babchyn	839	194	Khoiniki	Бабчын	Бабчин
Bagushi	599	195	Brahin	Багушы	Богуши
Buda	267	56	Khoiniki	Буда	Буда
Chamkou	138	29	Khoiniki	Чамкоў	Чемков
Dzernavichy	1,016	308	Narowlya	Дзёрнавічы	Дёрновичи
Haroshkau	191	154	Khoiniki	Гарошкаў	Горошков
Kalyban	977	270	Brahin	Калыбань	Колыбань
Kaporanka	317	70	Brahin	Капоранка	Капоренка
Kazhushki	869	214	Khoiniki	Кажушкі	Кожушки
Lomachy	177	38	Khoiniki	Ломачы	Ломачи
Novakukhnaushchyna	135	13	Khoiniki	Новакухнаўшчына	Новокухновщина
Novy Pakrousk	176	29	Khoiniki	Новы Пакроўск	Новый Покровск
Pasudava	642	73	Brahin	Пасудава	Посудово
Pirki	552	476	Brahin	Піркі	Пирки
Rudyya	245	40	Khoiniki	Рудыя	Рудые

== Fauna and flora ==
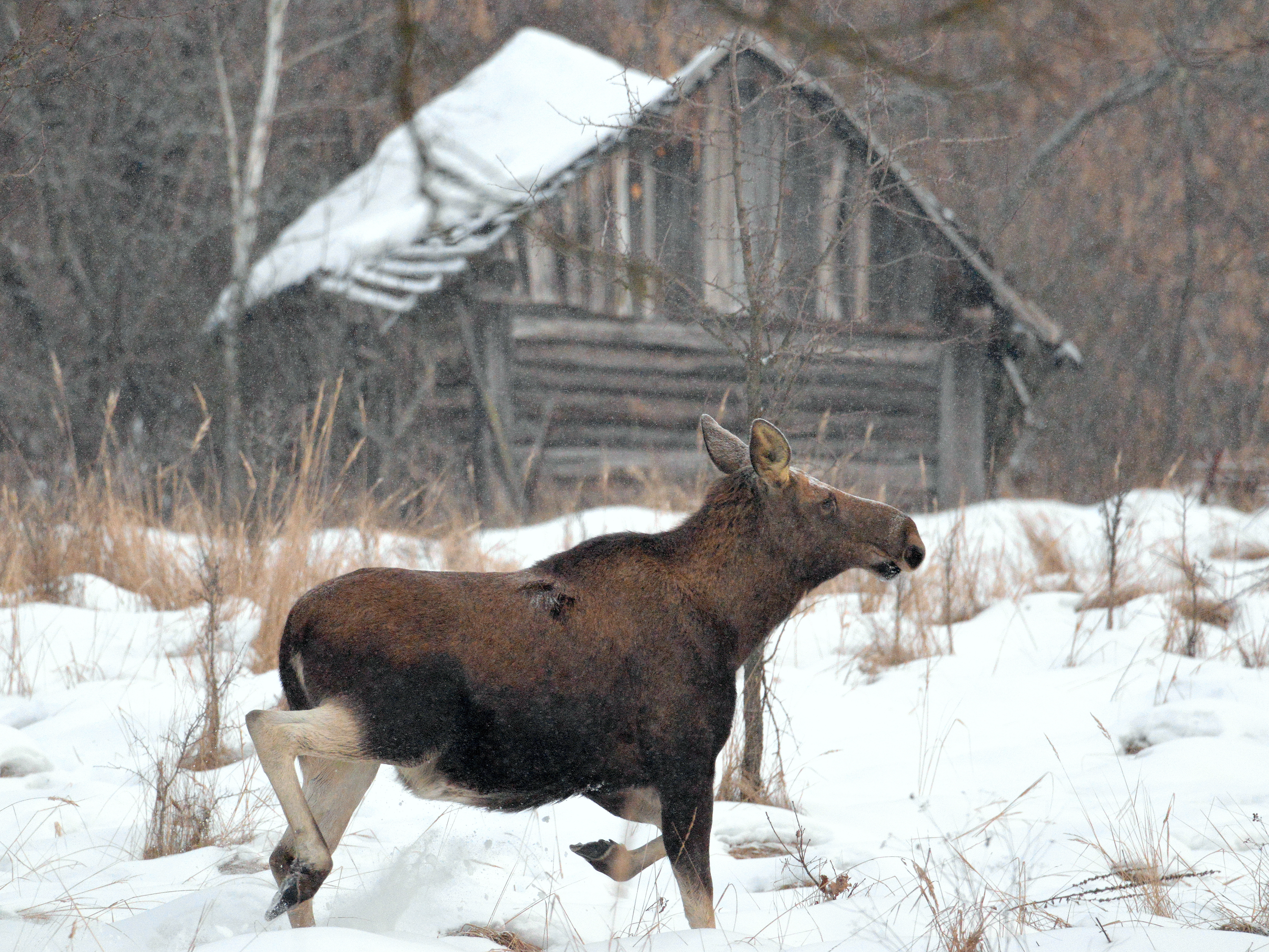
An elk in the reserve

The reserve hosts many rare and endangered species, which thrive there thanks to the virtual absence of humans. They include European bison, Przewalski horse, elk, brown bear, golden eagle, and white-tailed eagle. It is home to the world's largest population of the European pond turtle. According to PSRER administration, there are 7 reptile, 11 amphibian, 46 mammal, 213 bird and 25 fish species. Of those, 70 are listed in the International Red Book and the Red Book of the Republic of Belarus. Flora includes 1251 registered plants, which is more than two-thirds of the flora of the country, and 18 of the plant species are listed in the Red Book. It was found that voles have higher rates of cataracts, useful populations of bacteria on the wings of birds in the zone are lower, partial albinism is common among barn swallows, and cuckoos have become less common. Serious animal mutations, though, happened only right after the accident.

== Activities ==
Although the reserve was established for the purpose of radiobiological and environmental research, it is of interest to other biologists. Due to the minimal human presence, it is possible to observe the natural development of wildlife in the conditions of Belarus. "In connection with the removal of anthropogenic load and the wealth of flora the ideal conditions for the recovery of the animal world have been created here", states the report of the Committee on the Health Effects of the Chernobyl disaster at the Council of Ministers of Belarus. Some new species, including European bison, have been introduced on the territory of the reserve.

=== Main activities ===
Administration of PSRER is located in the town of Khoiniki. The annual budget of PSRER is 4 million USD. Main activities include:

- Measures to prevent radioactive material from spreading beyond the reserve's borders,
- Wildfire prevention.
- Radiation monitoring.
- Research of nuclear decontamination of soil.
- Preventing unauthorized persons from entering the reserve.
- Planting trees to prevent air and water erosion, which could spread contaminated material.

=== Extra-budgetary activities ===
The administration uses land in the reserve to earn income in addition to its budget. The purpose is to increase the self-sufficiency of the reserve, save money, increase the salaries of employees and contribute positively to the GDP of Belarus. Activities include:

- Forestry and woodworking, including the sale of timber, firewood, and individual carpentry orders
- Growing crops as fodder for animals or for human consumption
- Purebred horse breeding using forage resources in the reserve
- Pig farming, cattle farming, dairy farming
- Beekeeping, honey production
- Production of fruit tree seedlings
- Providing services to citizens and organizations (transport, sanitation, human decontamination, research on the concentration of radionuclides).

As of 2004, the herd at the reserve's horse farm numbered 230 horses. Cattle are being bred to endure the conditions of radioactive contamination, and young individuals are sold for further breeding.

During all activities, radionuclide concentrations are monitored to ensure they do not exceed certain limits.

=== Tourism ===
The Polesie State Radioecological Reserve is open to limited and controlled tourism. In 2025, the reserve had a total of 3,100 visitors, of whom 30% were foreign nationals.

== Neighboring nature reserves ==
- Mizhrichynskyi Regional Landscape Park
- Pripyatsky National Park
- Zalissia National Nature Park

=== Proposed for nature reserves ===
- Dnieper-Teterivske State Forestry

As of 2024, besides the Polesie State Radioecological Reserve bordering Ukraine, there are also closed areas in other part of Belarus along the Russian border, located east and north of the city of Vetka. These zones are situated in the eastern part of the Gomel region and the southeastern part of the Mogilev region, south of the city of Cherykaw. Signboards mark the boundaries of the area and indicate radiation exposure. Entry to the area is permitted only with permission from the authorities.

== See also ==
- Protected areas of Belarus
- National Radioactive Waste Repository
