= Astravyets district =

District of Grodno region, Belarus

Astravyets district Астравецкі раён (Belarusian) Островецкий район (Russian)
- District
- Flag Coat of arms

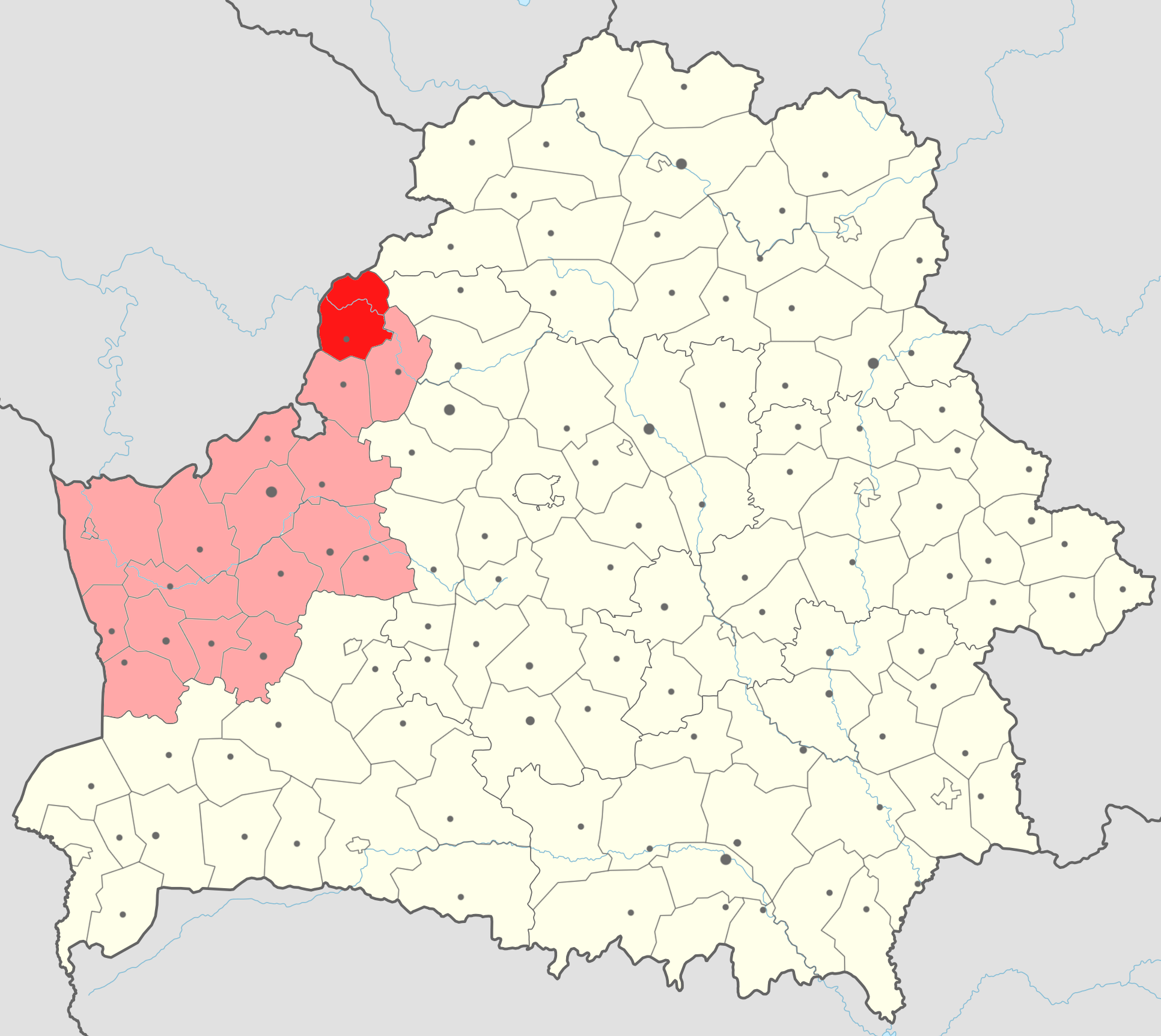
- Country: Belarus
- Region: Grodno region
- Administrative center: Astravyets

Area
  - District: 1,568.77 km^{2} (605.71 sq mi)

Population (2024)
  - District: 28,662
  - Density: 18.270/km^{2} (47.320/sq mi)
  - Urban: 15,116
  - Rural: 13,546
- Time zone: UTC+3 (MSK)

Astravyets district or Astraviec district (Belarusian: Астравецкі раён; Russian: Островецкий район) is a district (raion) of Grodno region in Belarus. The administrative center is Astravyets. As of 2024, it has a population of 28,662.

== History ==
- 1940 – Astravyets District was established in Vilyeyka Region
- 1941 – the area was bombed and then occupied by German troops
- 1944 – Soviet partisans liberated Astravyets and the district became part of Molodechno Region.
- 1960 – the district became part of Grodno Region
- 1991 – the Republic of Belarus became independent
- 2007 – the heraldic symbols of Astravyets and Astravyets District were officially recognized
- 2011 – construction began on the nuclear power plant in Astravyets District
- 2012 – Astravyets received the status of city

== Administrative divisions ==
Astravyets district is divided into 9 village soviets:

- Vornyansky
- Gherviatsky
- Gudogaysky
- Mihalishkovskiy
- Astravyets
- Podolsky
- Rytan
- Spondovo
- Trokenik

== Notable residents ==
- Napoleon Cybulski (1854 – 1919), Polish physiologist
- Adam Maldzis (1932, Rasoly village – 2022), Belarusian historian, literary critic and scholar

== See also ==
- National Radioactive Waste Repository
