= Districts of Belarus =

Second-level administrative divisions of Belarus

Regions of Belarus
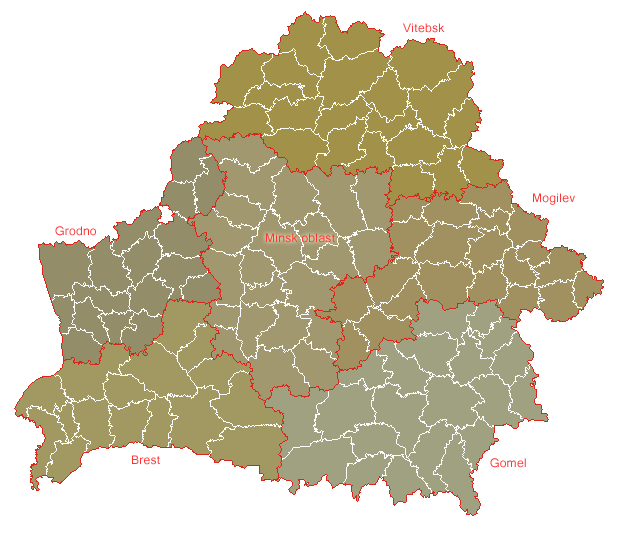
- Category: Second-level subdivision of a unitary state
- Location: Belarus
- Number: 118
- Government: District government
- Subdivisions: Cities Urban-type settlements Villages

A district or raion (Russian: район, romanized: rayon, pl. районы, rayony; Belarusian: раён, romanized: rajon, pl. раёны, rajony) in Belarus is the second-level administrative division in the country which are subordinate to regions (also known as oblasts).

== List of districts ==
=== Brest region ===
English name	Belarusian name	Russian name	Seat
Baranavichy district	Баранавіцкі раён	Барановичский район	Baranavichy
Brest district	Брэсцкі раён	Брестский район	Brest
Byaroza district	Бярозаўскі раён	Берёзовский район	Byaroza
Drahichyn district	Драгічынскі раён	Дрогичинский район	Drahichyn
Hantsavichy district	Ганцавіцкі раён	Ганцевичский район	Hantsavichy
Ivanava district	Іванаўскі раён	Ивановский район	Ivanava
Ivatsevichy district	Івацэвіцкі раён	Ивацевичский район	Ivatsevichy
Kamyenyets district	Камянецкі раён	Каменецкий район	Kamyenyets
Kobryn district	Кобрынскі раён	Кобринский район	Kobryn
Luninyets district	Лунінецкі раён	Лунинецкий район	Luninyets
Lyakhavichy district	Ляхавіцкі раён	Ляховичский район	Lyakhavichy
Malaryta district	Маларыцкі раён	Малоритский район	Malaryta
Pinsk district	Пінскі раён	Пинский район	Pinsk
Pruzhany district	Пружанскі раён	Пружанский район	Pruzhany
Stolin district	Столінскі раён	Столинский район	Stolin
Zhabinka district	Жабінкаўскі раён	Жабинковский район	Zhabinka

=== Gomel/Homiel region ===
English name	Belarusian name	Russian name	Seat
Aktsyabrski district	Акцябрскі раён	Октябрьский район	Aktsyabrski
Brahin district	Брагінскі раён	Брагинский район	Brahin
Buda-Kashalyova district	Буда-Кашалёўскі раён	Буда-Кошелёвский район	Buda-Kashalyova
Chachersk district	Чачэрскі раён	Чечерский район	Chachersk
Dobrush district	Добрушскі раён	Добрушский район	Dobrush
Gomel district	Гомельскі раён	Гомельский район	Gomel
Yelsk district	Ельскі раён	Ельский район	Yelsk
Kalinkavichy district	Калінкавіцкі раён	Калинковичский район	Kalinkavichy
Karma district	Кармянскі раён	Кормянский район	Karma
Khoiniki district	Хойніцкі раён	Хойникский район	Khoiniki
Loyew district	Лоеўскі раён	Лоевский район	Loyew
Lyelchytsy district	Лельчыцкі раён	Лельчицкий район	Lyelchytsy
Mazyr district	Мазырскі раён	Мозырский район	Mazyr
Narowlya district	Нараўлянскі раён	Наровлянский район	Narowlya
Pyetrykaw district	Петрыкаўскі раён	Петриковский район	Pyetrykaw
Rahachow district	Рагачоўскі раён	Рогачёвский район	Rahachow
Rechytsa district	Рэчыцкі раён	Речицкий район	Rechytsa
Svyetlahorsk district	Светлагорскі раён	Светлогорский район	Svyetlahorsk
Vyetka district	Веткаўскі раён	Ветковский район	Vyetka
Zhlobin district	Жлобінскі раён	Жлобинский район	Zhlobin
Zhytkavichy district	Жыткавіцкі раён	Житковичский район	Zhytkavichy

=== Grodno/Hrodna region ===
English name	Belarusian name	Russian name	Seat
Ashmyany district	Ашмянскі раён	Ошмянский район	Ashmyany
Astravyets district	Астравецкі раён	Островецкий район	Astravyets
Byerastavitsa district	Бераставіцкі раён	Берестовицкий район	Vyalikaya Byerastavitsa
Dzyatlava district	Дзятлаўскі раён	Дятловский район	Dzyatlava
Grodno district	Гродзенскі раён	Гродненский район	Grodno
Iwye district	Іўеўскі раён	Ивьевский район	Ilwye
Karelichy district	Карэліцкі раён	Кореличский район	Karelichy
Lida district	Лідскі раён	Лидский район	Lida
Masty district	Мастоўскі раён	Мостовский район	Masty
Novogrudok district	Навагрудскі раён	Новогрудский район	Novogrudok
Shchuchyn district	Шчучынскі раён	Щучинский район	Shchuchyn
Slonim district	Слонімскі раён	Слонимский район	Slonim
Smarhon district	Смаргонскі раён	Сморгонский район	Smarhon
Svislach district	Свіслацкі раён	Свислочский район	Svislach
Vawkavysk district	Ваўкавыскі раён	Волковысский район	Vawkavysk
Voranava district	Воранаўскі раён	Вороновский район	Voranava
Zelva district	Зэльвенскі раён	Зельвенский район	Zelva

=== Minsk region ===
English name	Belarusian name	Russian name	Seat
Barysaw district	Барысаўскі раён	Борисовский район	Barysaw
Byerazino district	Бярэзінскі раён	Березинский район	Byerazino
Chervyen district	Чэрвеньскі раён	Червенский район	Chervyen
Dzyarzhynsk district	Дзяржынскі раён	Дзержинский район	Dzyarzhynsk
Kapyl district	Капыльскі раён	Копыльский район	Kapyl
Klyetsk district	Клецкі раён	Клецкий район	Klyetsk
Krupki district	Крупскі раён	Крупский район	Krupki
Lahoysk district	Лагойскі раён	Логойский район	Lahoysk
Lyuban district	Любанскі раён	Любанский район	Lyuban
Maladzyechna district	Маладзечанскі раён	Молодечненский район	Maladzyechna
Minsk district	Мінскі раён	Минский район	Minsk
Myadzyel district	Мядзельскі раён	Мядельский район	Myadzyel
Nyasvizh district	Нясвіжскі раён	Несвижский район	Nyasvizh
Pukhavichy district	Пухавіцкі раён	Пуховичский район	Marjina Horka
Salihorsk district	Салігорскі раён	Солигорский район	Salihorsk
Slutsk district	Слуцкі раён	Слуцкий район	Slutsk
Smalyavichy district	Смалявіцкі раён	Смолевичский район	Smalyavichy
Staryya Darohi district	Старадарожскі раён	Стародорожский район	Staryya Darohi
Stowbtsy district	Стаўбцоўскі раён	Столбцовский район	Stowbtsy
Uzda district	Уздзенскі раён	Узденский район	Uzda
Valozhyn district	Валожынскі раён	Воложинский район	Valozhyn
Vileyka district	Вілейскі раён	Вилейский район	Vilyeyka

=== Mogilev/Mahiliou region ===
English name	Belarusian name	Russian name	Seat
Asipovichy district	Асіповіцкі раён	Осиповичский район	Asipovichy
Babruysk district	Бабруйскі раён	Бобруйский район	Babruysk
Byalynichy district	Бялыніцкі раён	Белыничский район	Byalynichy
Bykhaw district	Быхаўскі раён	Быховский район	Bykhaw
Chavusy district	Чавускі раён	Чаусский район	Chavusy
Cherykaw district	Чэрыкаўскі раён	Чериковский район	Cherykaw
Drybin district	Дрыбінскі раён	Дрибинский район	Drybin
Hlusk district	Глускі раён	Глусский район	Hlusk
Horki district	Горацкі раён	Горецкий район	Horki
Kastsyukovichy district	Касцюковіцкі раён	Костюковичский район	Kastsyukovichy
Khotsimsk district	Хоцімскі раён	Хотимский район	Khotsimsk
Kirawsk district	Кіраўскі раён	Кировский район	Kirawsk
Klichaw district	Клічаўскі раён	Кличевский район	Klichaw
Klimavichy district	Клімавіцкі раён	Климовичский район	Klimavichy
Krasnapollye district	Краснапольскі раён	Краснопольский район	Krasnapollye
Kruhlaye district	Круглянскі раён	Круглянский район	Kruhlaye
Krychaw district	Крычаўскі раён	Кричевский район	Krychaw
Mogilev district	Магілёўскі раён	Могилёвский район	Mogilev
Mstsislaw district	Мсціслаўскі раён	Мстиславский район	Mstsislaw
Shklow district	Шклоўскі раён	Шкловский район	Shklow
Slawharad district	Слаўгарадскі раён	Славгородский район	Slawharad

=== Vitebsk/Vitsyebsk region ===
English name	Belarusian name	Russian name	Seat
Beshankovichy district	Бешанковіцкі раён	Бешенковичский район	Beshankovichy
Braslaw district	Браслаўскі раён	Браславский район	Braslaw
Chashniki district	Чашніцкі раён	Чашницкий район	Chashniki
Dokshytsy district	Докшыцкі раён	Докшицкий район	Dokshytsy
Dubrowna district	Дубровенскі раён	Дубровенский район	Dubrowna
Haradok district	Гарадоцкі раён	Городокский район	Haradok
Hlybokaye district	Глыбоцкі раён	Глубокский район	Hlybokaye
Lyepyel district	Лепельскі раён	Лепельский район	Lyepyel
Lyozna district	Лёзненскі раён	Лиозненский район	Lyozna
Miory district	Міёрскі раён	Миорский район	Miory
Orsha district	Аршанскі раён	Оршанский район	Orsha
Pastavy district	Пастаўскі раён	Поставский район	Pastavy
Polotsk district	Полацкі раён	Полоцкий район	Polotsk
Rasony district	Расонскі раён	Россонский район	Rasony
Sharkawshchyna district	Шаркаўшчынскі раён	Шарковщинский район	Sharkawshchyna
Shumilina district	Шумілінскі раён	Шумилинский район	Shumilina
Syanno district	Сенненскі раён	Сенненский район	Syanno
Talachyn district	Талачынскі раён	Толочинский район	Talachyn
Ushachy district	Ушацкі раён	Ушачский район	Ushachy
Vyerkhnyadzvinsk district	Верхнядзвінскі раён	Верхнедвинский район	Vyerkhnyadzvinsk
Vitebsk district	Віцебскі раён	Витебский район	Vitebsk

== See also ==
- Regions of Belarus, 1st level subdivision
- Rural councils of Belarus, 3rd level subdivision
