= National Radioactive Waste Repository =

Facility in Belarus

The National Radioactive Waste Repository (NRWR) is a planned engineering and technical facility in Belarus designed for the centralized, long-term isolation, conditioning, and disposal of radioactive waste. The legal basis for its creation was established under the National Strategy for Radioactive Waste Management, authorized by the Council of Ministers of Belarus in 2024.

The facility is primarily intended to handle technological waste generated by the Belarusian nuclear power plant (BelNPP) near Astravyets, as well as vitrified high-level waste returned after the reprocessing of spent nuclear fuel in Russia.

== Background and sites ==
The designated state operator for the site selection and repository management is the republican unitary enterprise "Belarusian Radioactive Waste Management Organization" (BelRAO). Candidate sites for facility construction include three regions: Astravyets District (near the nuclear plant), Mstsislaw District (near the Russian border), and areas of the Polesie State Radioecological Reserve in Khoiniki District, bordering Ukraine.

The repository project has been the focus of public discussion and technical critique by independent ecological organizations regarding long-term containment security in shallow geological layers and the administration of safety evaluations.

== See also ==
- Astravets Nuclear Power Plant
- Polesie State Radioecological Reserve
- High-level radioactive waste management
