= Khoiniki district =

District of Gomel region, Belarus

Khoiniki district Хойніцкі раён (Belarusian) Хойникский район (Russian)
- District
- Flag Coat of arms

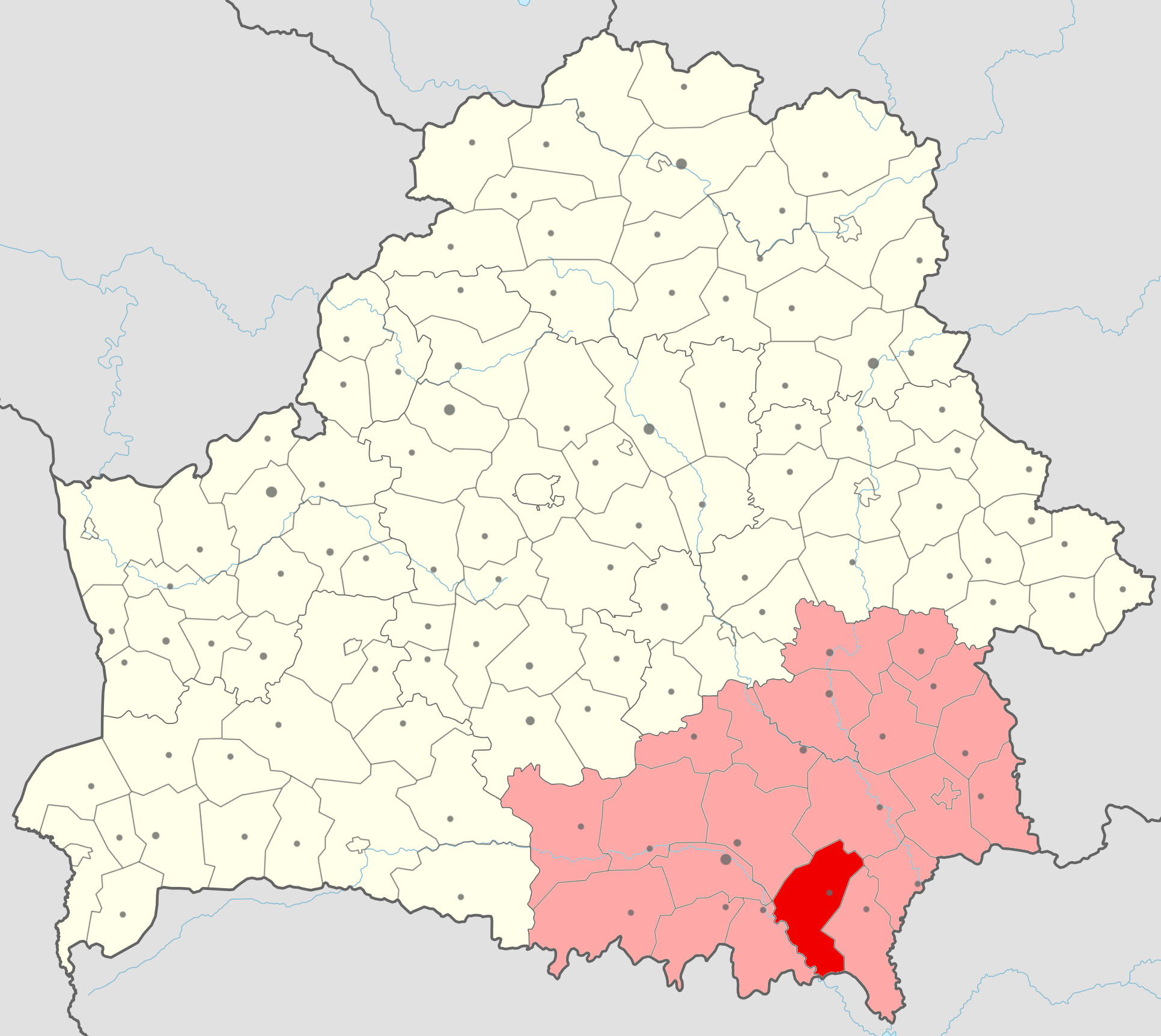
- Location of Khoiniki Raion within Gomel Region
- Coordinates: 51°54′N 29°58′E
- Country: Belarus
- Region: Gomel region
- Administrative center: Khoiniki

Area
  - Total: 2,027.74 km^{2} (782.91 sq mi)

Population (2024)
  - Total: 18,435
  - Density: 9.0914/km^{2} (23.547/sq mi)
- Time zone: UTC+3 (MSK)
- Website: hoiniki.gov.by

Khoiniki district or Chojniki district (Belarusian: Хойніцкі раён, romanized: Chojnicki rajon; Russian: Хойникский район) is a district (raion) of Gomel region in Belarus. Its administrative center is the town of Khoiniki. As of 2024, it has a population of 18,435.

== Geography ==
The district includes the town of Khoiniki, eight rural councils (selsoviets), and several villages. Following the 1986 Chernobyl disaster, it is partially included in the Polesie State Radioecological Reserve.

== Notable residents ==
- Iosif Goshkevich (1814, Straličaǔ – 1875), diplomat and Orientalist
- Ivan Melezh (1921, Hlinišča – 1976), writer, playwright and publicist
- Fyodor Stravinsky (1843, Novy Dvor (Aleksičy) – 1902), opera singer and actor

== See also ==
- Chernobyl Nuclear Power Plant
- National Radioactive Waste Repository
