= Belenergo =

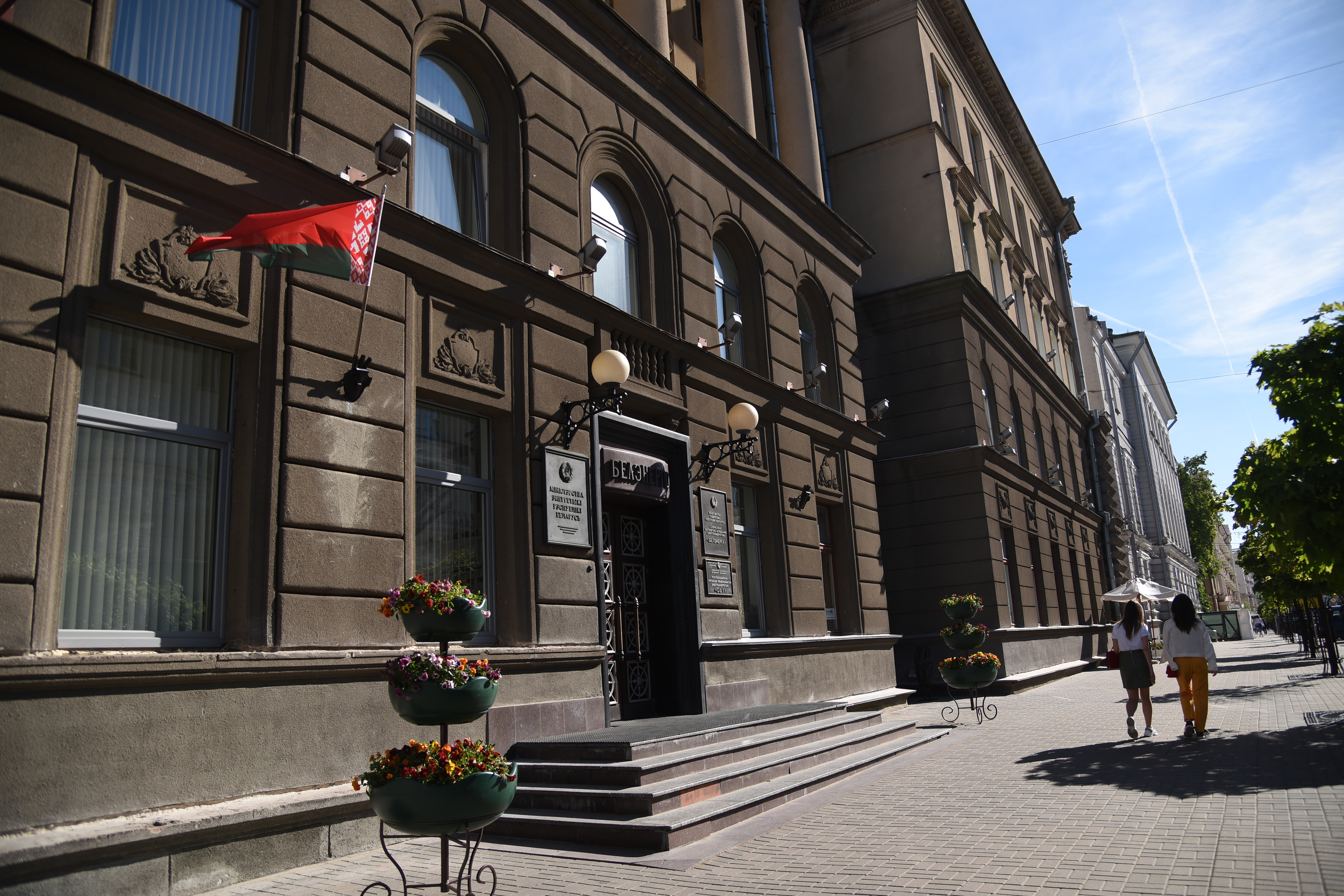
- Headquarters of Belenergo in Minsk
- Company type: Government-owned corporation
- Industry: Energy, Electricity
- Founded: 1995 (current form)
- Founder: Government of Belarus
- Headquarters: 14 Karl Marks street, Minsk, Belarus
- Products: Electric power
- Services: Electric power distribution
- Owner: Ministry of Energy
- Website: belenergo.by

Belenergo (Belarusian: Дзяржаўнае вытворчае аб'яднанне «Белэнерга»; Russian: Государственное производственное объединение «Белэнерго») is a Belarusian state energy concern which manages the economic activities of the electric power complex of Belarus. It is subordinate to the Ministry of Energy.

== History ==
The company traces its origins to 15 May 1932 when on that day, the District Administration of State Electric Stations and Networks of the Belarusian Socialist Republic "Belenergo" was created in accordance with order No. 184 issued by the State All-Union Association of Energy Economy "ENERGOTSENTR". In 1992 with the independence of Belarus, Belarusian Territorial Energy Association "Belorusenergo" (Russian: территориальное энергетическое объединение (ТЭО) «Белорусэнерго») was created out of the Soviet company, and received its current status in 1995.

== Operations ==
- Its main area of activities include:
- Management of the Belarusian energy system;
- Production, transmission and distribution of electric and thermal energy;
- Maintenance of power plants, electric and thermal networks in proper condition;
- Operational and dispatch management of the technological process of electricity production and supply;
- Technical supervision of the condition of power plants and network facilities of the Belarusian energy system;
- Organization of work ensuring balanced development of the energy system, including forecasting of energy demand, design, investment
- Construction of energy facilities;
- Licensing of electricity production.

It includes the regional RUEs (republican unitary enterprises) "Brestenergo", "Vitebskenergo", "Gomelenergo", "Grodnoenergo", "Minskenergo", "Mogilevenergo", as well as 30 other enterprises: RUE "Belenergoahova", RUE "Belenergoautomatika", UA "Minsk State Power Engineering College", OJSC "Belenergostroy", OJSC "Tsentrenergomontazh" and others.
