= Astravyets =

Astravyets Астравец (Belarusian) Островец (Russian) Ostrovets
- Town
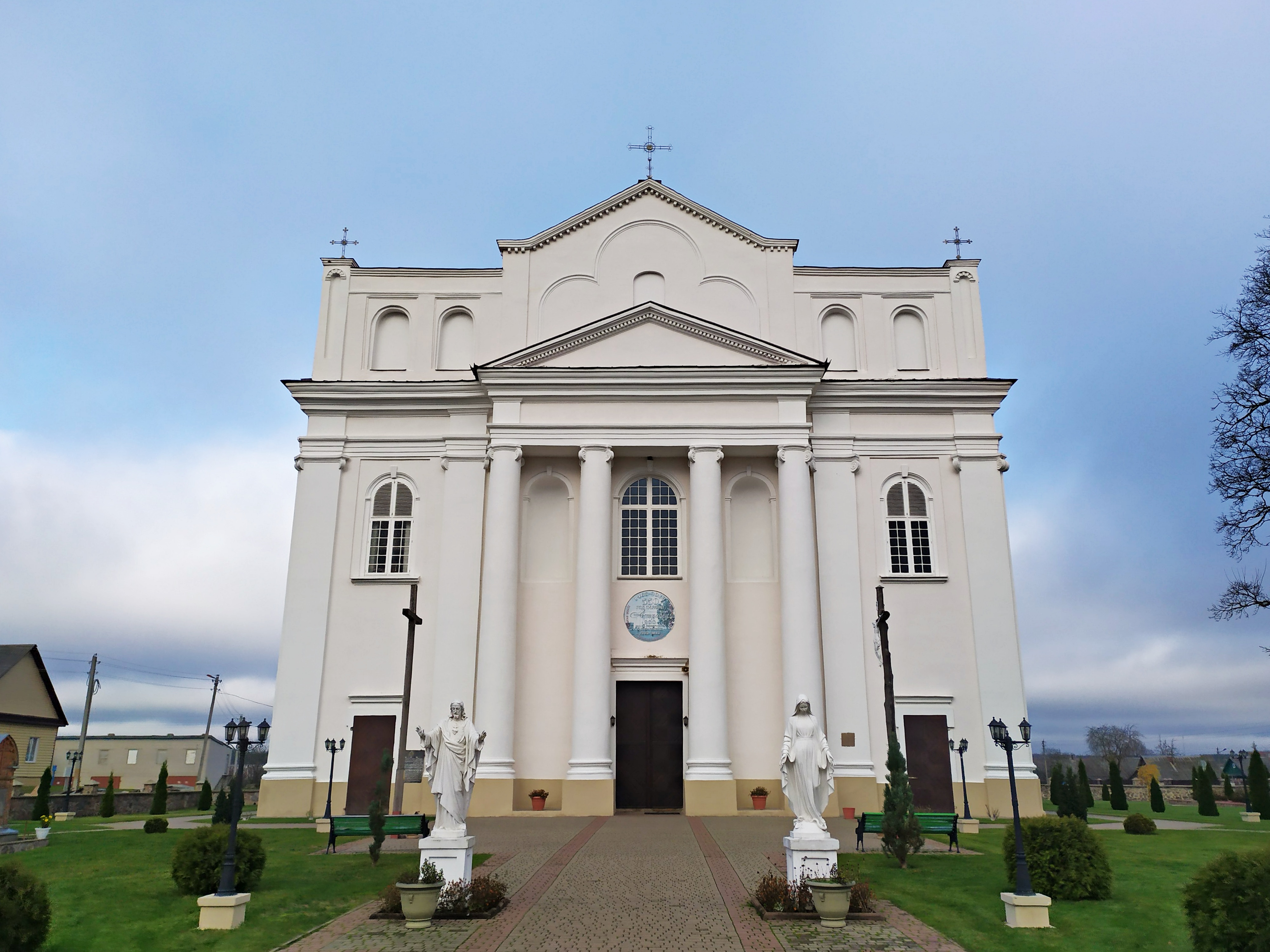
- Saints Cosmas and Damian church

- Flag Coat of arms

- Location within Belarus
- Coordinates: 54°36′49″N 25°57′19″E
- Country: Belarus
- Region: Grodno Region
- District: Astravyets District

Population (2025)
  - Total: 15,265
- Time zone: UTC+3 (MSK)
- Postal code: 231201
- Area code: +375 1591
- Website: www.ostrovets.gov.by

Astravyets or Ostrovets (Note: Belarusian: Астравец, romanized: Astraviec, IPA: [astraˈvʲet͡s]; Russian: Островец, romanized: Ostrovets, IPA: [ɐstrɐˈvʲets]; Polish: Ostrowiec; Lithuanian: Astravas.) is a town in Grodno Region, Belarus. It serves as the administrative center of Astravyets District. As of 2025, it has a population of 15,265.

== History ==
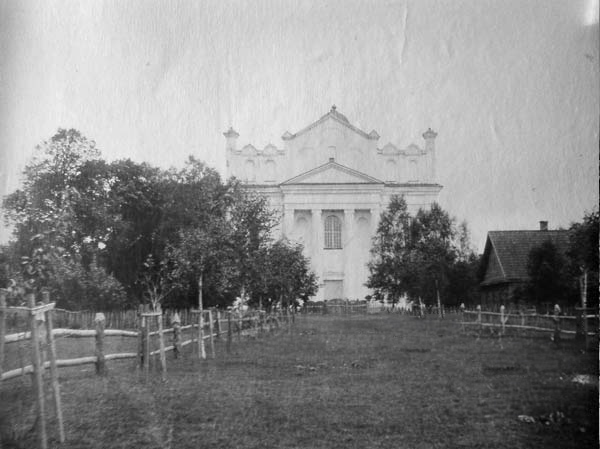
Former Dominican church in c. 1900

Within the Grand Duchy of Lithuania and the Polish–Lithuanian Commonwealth, Astravyets was part of Vilnius Voivodeship. In 1474, Voivode of Kyiv Martynas Goštautas founded a Dominican monastery and church. By decree of King Sigismund II Augustus from 1537, the town passed to Stanislovas Goštautas, and later on it passed to the Korycki and Korsak noble families.

In 1795, Astravyets was acquired by the Russian Empire in the course of the Third Partition of Poland. Following the unsuccessful Polish January Uprising, in 1866, the Tsarist authorities closed the Domican monastery and converted the Dominican church into an Orthodox church. From 1921 until 1939, Astravyets was part of the Second Polish Republic.

During World War II, in September 1939, the town was occupied by the Red Army and, on 14 November 1939, incorporated into the Byelorussian SSR. From 27 June 1941 until 3 July 1944, Astravyets was occupied by Nazi Germany and administered as a part of the Generalbezirk Litauen of Reichskommissariat Ostland.

On 11 October 2011, an agreement was signed to build the first nuclear power plant in Belarus near the town, using two VVER reactors with active and passive safety systems.

== See also ==
- National Radioactive Waste Repository
