= Mstsislaw district =

District of Mogilev region, Belarus

Coordinates: 54°01′N 31°43′E

Mstsislaw district Мсціслаўскі раён (Belarusian) Мстиславский район (Russian)
- District
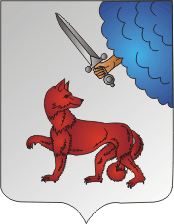
- Flag Coat of arms

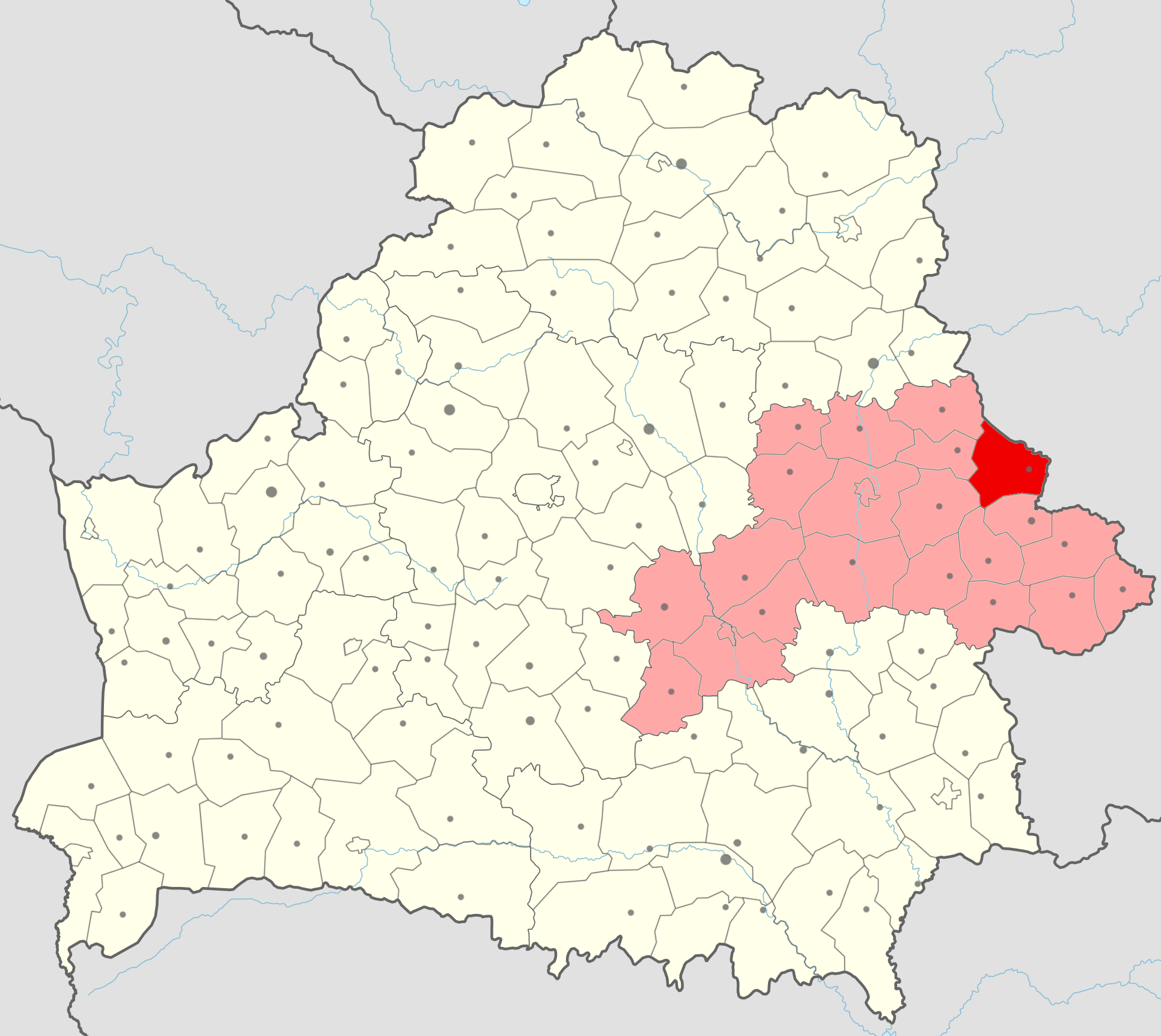
- Country: Belarus
- Region: Mogilev region
- Administrative center: Mstsislaw

Area
  - Total: 1,332.51 km^{2} (514.48 sq mi)

Population (2023)
  - Total: 18,671
  - Density: 14.012/km^{2} (36.291/sq mi)
- Time zone: UTC+3 (MSK)

Mstsislaw district or Mscislaŭ district (Belarusian: Мсціслаўскі раён; Russian: Мстиславский район, romanized: Mstislavsky rayon) is a district (raion) of Mogilev region in Belarus. The administrative center is the town of Mstsislaw. As of 2009, its population was 24,768. The population of Mstsislaw accounts for 43.6% of the district's population.

== Notable residents ==
- Maksim Harecki (1893 – 1938), Belarusian writer, journalist, activist of the Belarusian independence movement and victim of Soviet repressions

== See also ==
- National Radioactive Waste Repository
