= List of highways numbered 11 Business =

Route 11 Business or Highway 11 Business may refer to:

- U.S. Route 11 Business
- North Carolina Highway 11 Business

== See also ==
- List of highways numbered 11
- List of highways numbered 11 Bypass
- List of highways numbered 11A
- List of highways numbered 11B
- List of highways numbered 11C
