= List of highways numbered 11 Bypass =

Route 11 Bypass or Highway 11 Bypass may refer to:

- US 11 Bypass
- North Carolina Highway 11 Bypass

== See also ==
- List of highways numbered 11
- List of highways numbered 11 Business
- List of highways numbered 11A
- List of highways numbered 11B
- List of highways numbered 11C
