= Lithuanians in Belarus =

Ethnic group in Belarus

Baltarusijos lietuviai
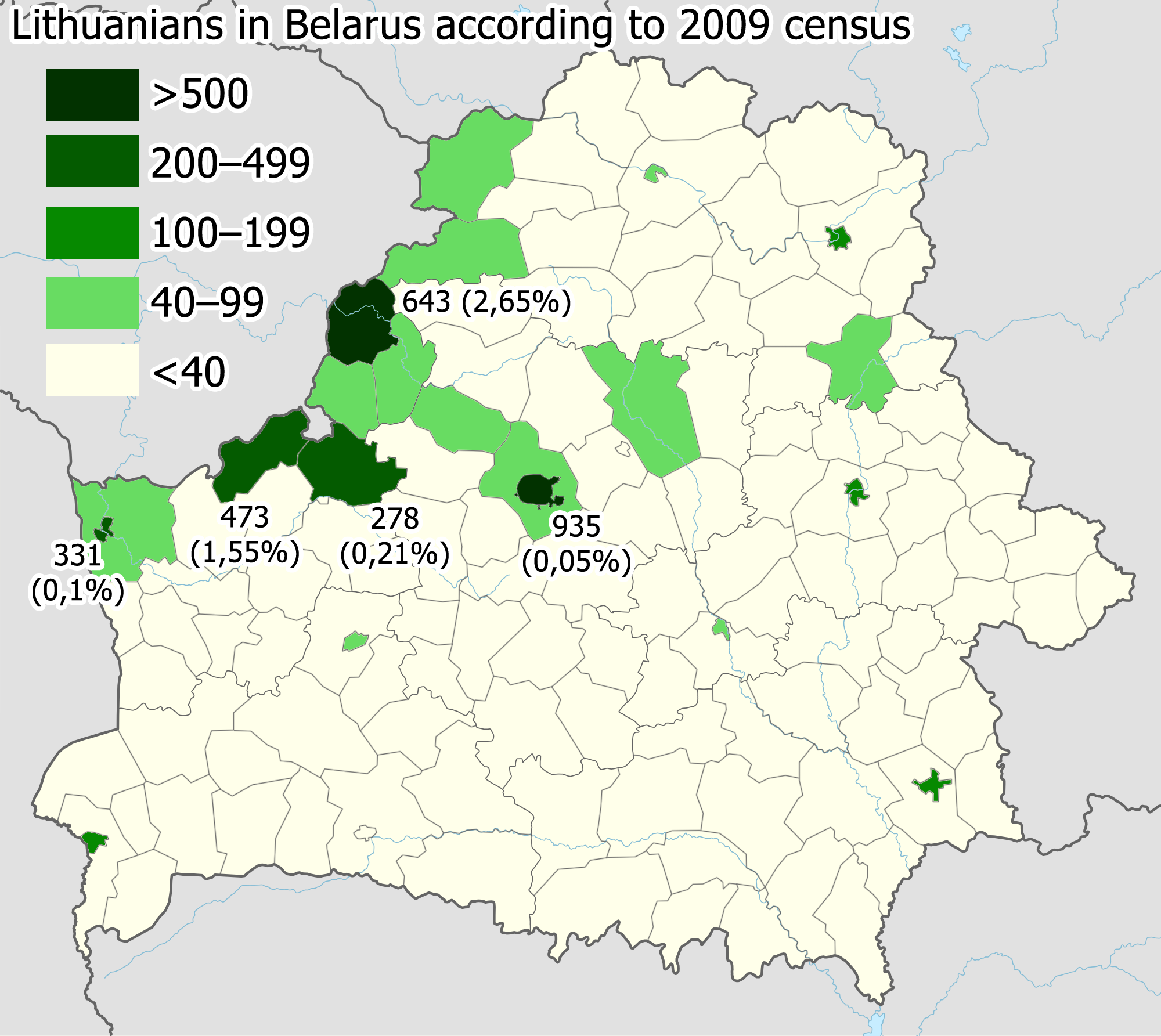

Total population
- 19,091 (2009, census)

Regions with significant populations
- Grodno Region, Vitebsk Region

Languages
- Lithuanian, Belarusian, Russian

Religion
- Christianity (Roman Catholicism)

Related ethnic groups
- Lithuanians

Lithuanians in Belarus (Lithuanian: Baltarusijos lietuviai; Belarusian: Беларускія літоўцы, romanized: Bielaruskija litoŭcy; Russian: Белорусские литовцы, romanized: Belorusskiye litovtsy) have a long history, as the lands of what is now Belarus was part of Lithuania (Note: The Kingdom of Lithuania (1251–1263) and the Grand Duchy of Lithuania (c. 1236–1251; 1263–1795).) for more than half a millennium from the 13th century onwards. The land of what is now Belarus was originally inhabited by Balts, while Slavs arrived in those lands during the late Early Middle Ages.

According to the 2009 census in Belarus, there were 19,091 ethnic Lithuanians in Belarus. Lithuanians are most significantly concentrated in the Grodno Region (specifically Voranava and Astravyets districts) and the western Vitebsk Region (Braslaw district). Smaller settlements and communities also exist in the eastern regions of the country and in major cities.

== History ==
The history of ethnic Balts in what is now Belarus is evidenced by numerous archaeological finds, hydronyms and toponyms. The territory of modern Belarus was inhabited solely by Balts from at least 2nd millennium BC. From the later part of the 1st millennium AD until the advent of Slavicisation, the numbers of Balts decreased, although isolated islands that maintained their culture remained.

=== Grand Duchy of Lithuania ===
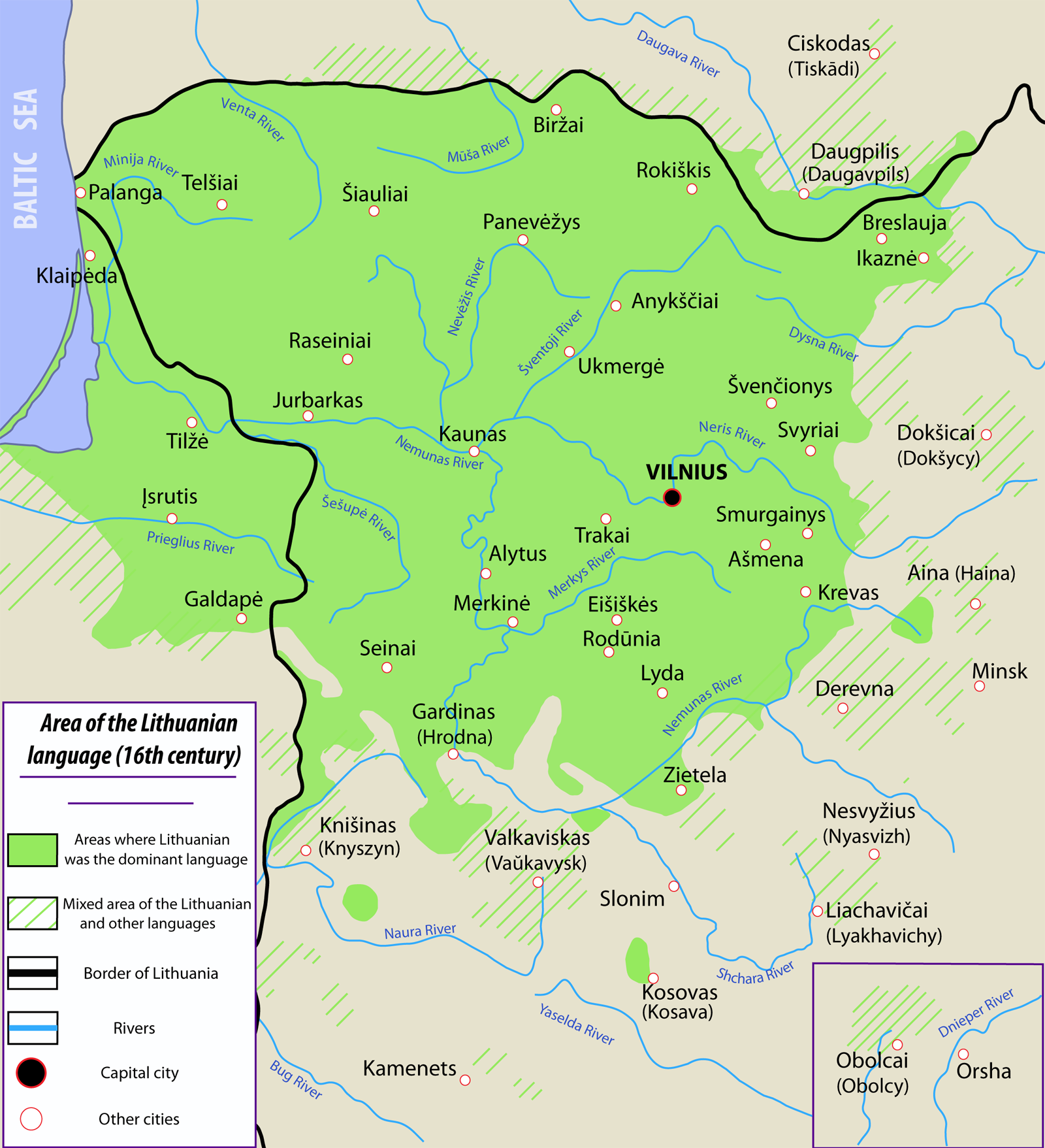
The Lithuanian language in the 16th century

Throughout the existence of the Grand Duchy of Lithuania, the territory of modern Belarus was inhabited by many Lithuanians. In the 14th–16th centuries, Lithuanians occupied the northwestern part of modern Belarus, generally north and west of the line Grodno–Shchuchyn–Lida–Valozhyn–Kreva–Pastavy–Braslaw. Written sources mention that Lithuanians lived in the Orsha District. Here, the remaining pagan Lithuanians were baptised in 1387 during the Christianization of Lithuania and the Roman Catholic parish of Aboltsy (which is located to the west of Orsha) was established. In the 15th and 16th centuries, the districts of Lida (Lithuanian: Lyda), Kreva (Lithuanian: Krėva), Ashmyany (Lithuanian: Ašmena), Smarhon (Lithuanian: Smurgainiai), Myadzyel (Lithuanian: Medilas), Vileyka (Lithuanian: Vileika), Vidzy (Lithuanian: Vidžiai) and Braslaw (Lithuanian: Breslauja), were Lithuanian. Some of the inhabitants of these areas were Polonized, while another part became Belarusified during the 16th to the 19th centuries. Until the 19th century Grodno (Lithuanian: Gardinas) with its surrounding vicinities belonged to the Lithuanian ethnographic area.

From the 13th century to the end of the 18th century, all of modern Belarus belonged to the Grand Duchy of Lithuania.

=== Russian Empire ===
During the 19th century and until the early 20th century, Belarus was governed by the Russian Empire.

In the mid-19th century, the areas of Perlamas, Ašiuža, Pariečė, Radun (Rodūnia), Pelesa (Pelyasa), Asava, Voranava, Benekainys, Apsas, Drūkšiai were Lithuanian. In the late 19th century, Lithuanian villages like Dimanovas, Malkava, and Sofeiskas were established by Lithuanians who moved there from the Vilnius and Kaunas Governorates to central and eastern Belarus.

=== 20th century ===
In the 20th century, Lithuanians remained in some villages within the districts of Voranava, Astravyets, Iwye and Braslaw. In 1915, as many Lithuanians fled through Belarus eastwards due to the ongoing World War I, so in Minsk and elsewhere, there existed chapters of the Lithuanian Society for the Relief of War Sufferers.

==== Interwar ====
During 1918–1920, the Lithuanian inhabitants of the eastern ethnographic Lithuania, which is now in Belarus, sought that those territories would be once more part of Lithuania. The Belarusian Democratic Republic was a failed Belarusian attempt at independence in the aftermath of World War I, whose territorial claims included ethnically Lithuanian lands. However, Eastern Belorussia was de facto occupied by Soviet Russia by 1920, which created the Byelorussian Soviet Socialist Republic. In December 1922, the Byelorussian SSR became one of the Soviet Union's founders.

In the BSSR (Eastern Belarus), significant efforts were made in the 1920s to support national minorities. In 1927, a Chair of Lithuanian History was established at Inbelkult. A Lithuanian sector existed in the National Academy of Sciences of Belarus (1929–1937) and a Lithuanian section within the Institute of National Minorities (1935). In 1927–1944 in Belarus, there were four Communist publications in Lithuanian. The Minsk Radio had weekly Lithuanian radio programs during 1928–37. In 1933–1934, there were 12 Lithuanian schools, national kolkhozes, and the Malkawka Lithuanian National Rural Council. However, in the late 1930s, Soviet policy shifted, leading to the closure of national schools and organizations. The census of 1937 showed a 20% drop in the Lithuanian population (to 5,422) compared to 1926, partly due to mass repressions targeting the intelligentsia.

In 1920–1939, Western Belorussia was ruled by the Second Polish Republic. Here, Lithuanian cultural and educational work was conducted by societies such as "Rytas" and "Šv. Kazimiero" (St. Casimir), which established primary schools and reading rooms. By the late 1930s, these activities were largely suppressed by Polish authorities.

After 1939, after the Soviet invasion of Poland, a part of the ethnically Lithuanian lands like Opsa (Apsas), Pieliasa (Pelesa), Radun (Rodūnia), Hieliuny (Gėliūnai), Hierviaty (Gervėčiai), Hiry (Girios), Rymdziuny (Rimdžiūnai), and other villages, which were inhabited by 24,000 Lithuanians until World War II, were included into the territory that is now Belarus.

==== World War II ====
During World War II, in the ethnically Lithuanian lands that were assigned to Generalbezirk Litauen, Lithuanian schools were established and Church services in Lithuanian were revived. At the end of summer in 1941 Lithuanian self-defence units, wearing the Lithuanian military uniforms, appeared in Grodno and were commanded by major Albinas Levickas. Subsequently, priest Viktoras Kurgonas established the Lithuanian National Committee (Lithuanian: Lietuvių tautinis komitetas) in Grodno and collaborated with Albinas Levickas. Both of them fluently spoke German and supported starving Lithuanians. At the time, the St. Mary's Church (Vytautas the Great's Church) was allocated to the Lithuanians in Grodno and Lithuanian religious services were held in it.

However, all schools were closed in the aftermath of World War II with the Soviet re-occupation of Lithuania. During the Soviet occupation, most of the prominent Lithuanian cultural and political figures were executed or deported to Siberia, including the Lithuanian communists.

==== 1945–1990 ====
Post-war years saw active migration of Lithuanians to the Lithuanian SSR and increased urbanization. By 1970, 69% of Lithuanians in eastern/central regions lived in cities; by 1989, this rose to 74%. Despite petitions to Soviet leadership, Lithuanian schools remained closed until 1956–1957, when 8 schools were opened in the Voranava and Astravyets districts. Over time, their number was reduced to three: in Hiry, Rymdziuny, and Pelesa.

Number of Lithuanians in 20th-century Belarus
Year of census	Number of ...
1926	6,864 Lithuanians
1959	8,363 Lithuanian-language speakers
1979	6,993 Lithuanian-language speakers (78% of those who registered as Lithuanians)
1989	7,606 Lithuanians

== Current situation (1990-present) ==
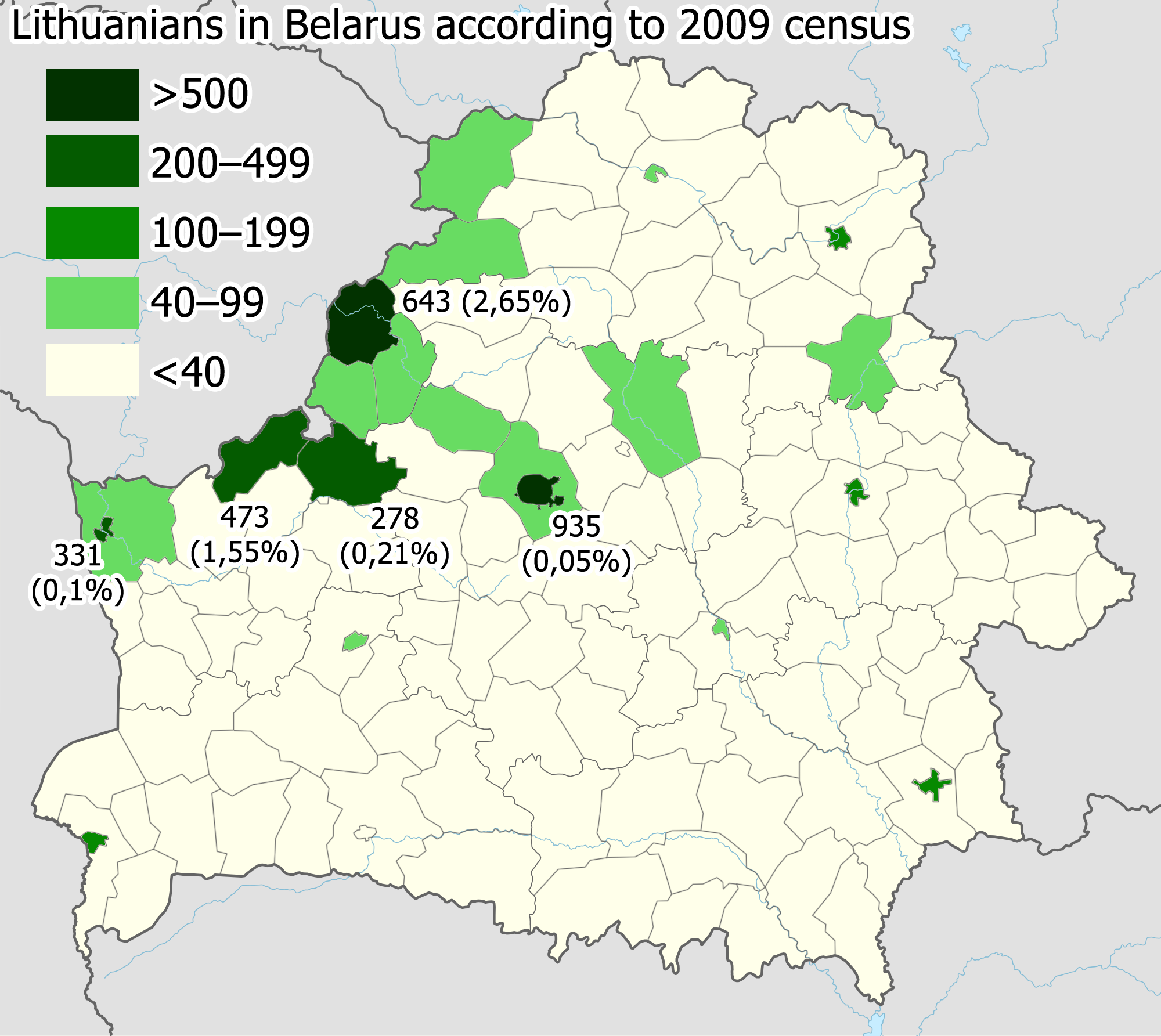

According to the census of 2009, there were 19,091 Lithuanians in Belarus.

=== Organizations and Media ===
Following the restoration of Lithuania's independence, new support structures for Lithuanians in Belarus were established. Since 1994, the Republican Public Association "Belarusian Community of Lithuanians" (Belarusian: Беларуская абшчына літоўцаў) has coordinated community life. Local chapters and clubs included "Tėvynė" (Fatherland) in Grodno, "Gimtinė" (Homeland) in Pelesa, "Rūta" in Lida, "Gervėčiai" in the Astravyets District, and groups in Braslaw. The community celebrates events such as the Day of Restoration of the State of Lithuania (February 16) and Statehood Day (July 6). The monthly newspaper Lietuvių godos (Lithuanian Dreams) has been published since 1993, and the bulletin Mūsų žodis (Our Word) since 1999.

=== Language and Dialects ===
The usage of the Lithuanian language in Belarus has declined significantly from a peak in 1959. Originally at 77%, the number of Lithuanian Belarusians who considered Lithuanian their native language had declined to 52% by the 1999 census, and to 31% by the 2009 census. The Russian language (and, to an extent, the Belarusian language) have filled the gap to replace Lithuanian, with 39% of Lithuanians speaking Russian natively and 26% speaking Belarusian natively.

Geographically, the Lithuanian language in Belarus includes the southernmost tip of the South Aukštaitian dialect, covering Radun, Pelesa, Voranava, and reaching as far south as the village of Zasetse near Dzyatlava (Zietela dialect). Isolated "Vilnius dialects" are also found in Hierviaty, Opsa, Lazduny, and Rynkyany.

Research published in 2024 indicates that the decline of the Lithuanian language in the border regions has accelerated. The three main historical "linguistic islands" of Lazūnai (Lazuny), Gervėčiai (Gervyaty), and the Pelesa–Rodūnia zone have experienced significant population loss. In the districts of Astravyets, Voranava, and Lida, while approximately 1,300 individuals declared Lithuanian ethnicity in 2019, only about 25% considered Lithuanian their mother tongue.

Sociolinguistic studies on the Southern Aukštaitian dialect spoken in the Voranava District describe a process of "language death" due to intense contact with the local Belarusian vernacular (referred to as po prostu).

=== Political Repressions (2020–present) ===
Following the 2020–2021 Belarusian protests, the Lukashenko regime initiated repressions against organizations of the Lithuanian minority, viewing them as instruments of "soft power" and potential destabilization. Between 2021 and 2024, authorities liquidated the Belarusian Community of Lithuanians, as well as regional organizations including "Gintaras" (Radun), "Rytas" (Braslaw), "Rūta" (Lida), "Vytis", "Gimtinė" (Pelesa), "Tėvynė" (Grodno), and the "Gervėčiai" club.

=== Education ===
Until 2022, two general education schools with Lithuanian as the language of instruction operated in Rymdziuny (Astravyets District) and Pelesa (Voranava District), supported by the Lithuanian government. However, amendments to the Code of the Republic of Belarus on Education came into effect on September 1, 2022, eliminating instruction in minority languages. Lithuanian was reduced to an optional subject. On August 12, 2022, Lithuania issued a formal diplomatic note protesting the closure of Lithuanian-medium schools. In response, on September 15, 2022, Belarus unilaterally terminated the agreement with Lithuania on cooperation in education.

== See also ==
- Belarus–Lithuania relations
