= C11 =

C11, C.XI, C-11 or C.11 may refer to:

== Transport ==
- C-11 Fleetster, a 1920s American light transport aircraft for use of the United States Assistant Secretary of War
- Fokker C.XI, a 1935 Dutch reconnaissance seaplane
- LET C-11, a license-build variant of the Soviet Yakovlev Yak-11 trainer aircraft
- C-11 Gulfstream II, the military designation of the Gulfstream II business jet
- Barroso (C11), a light cruiser of the Brazilian Navy
- HMS C11, a 1907 British Royal Navy C class submarine
- HMS Liverpool (C11), a 1937 British Royal Navy Town class light cruiser
- JNR Class C11, a class of Japanese steam locomotives
- USS Marblehead (C-11), an 1892 light cruiser of the United States Navy
- BSA C11, a British motorcycle manufactured between 1939 and 1956
- Mercedes-Benz C11, a 1990 Group C prototype race car
- London Buses route C11, a public transportation route in England
- LNER Class C11, a class of British steam locomotives
- Leapmotor C11, a mid-size electric crossover SUV

== Science and technology ==
- C11 (C standard revision), standardized version of the C programming language
- Head and neck cancer (ICD-10 code)
- Eye diseases, (MeSH code); see List of MeSH codes (C11)
- Carbon-11, an unstable isotope of the chemical element Carbon
- Caldwell 11, the Bubble Nebula, an emission nebula in the constellation Cassiopeia

== Other uses ==
- C11 (rifle), a competition and training weapon used by members of the Royal Canadian Army Cadets
- C11 Right of Association (Agriculture) Convention, 1921
- Bill C-11, various articles of legislation of the Parliament of Canada
- French Defence (Encyclopaedia of Chess Openings code)
- 11th century

== See also ==
- 11C (disambiguation)
