= Belarus–Lithuania relations =

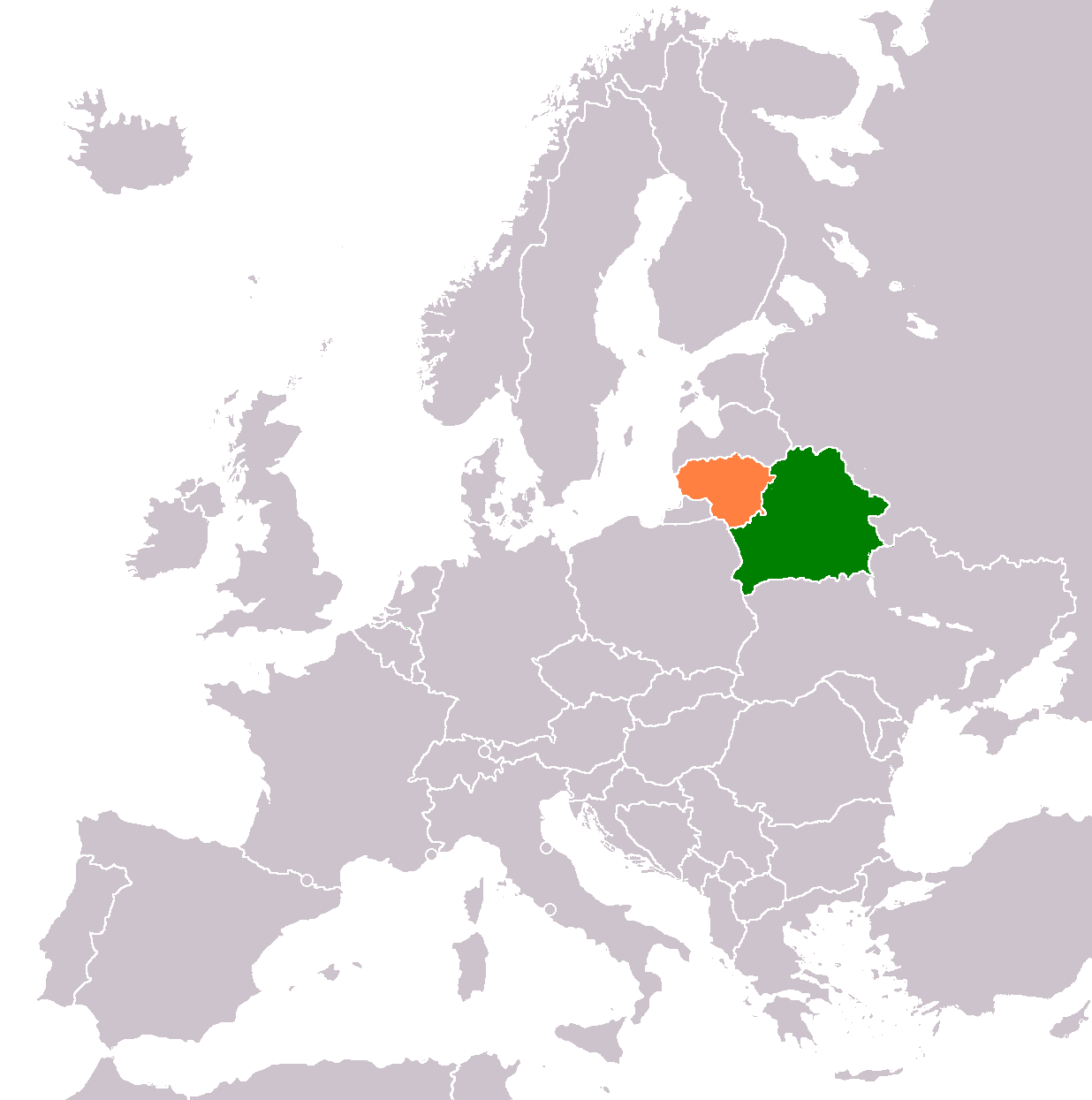

- Belarus: Lithuania

Belarus–Lithuania relations are the bilateral relations between the Republic of Belarus and the Republic of Lithuania. The two nations share a long and complex history within the Grand Duchy of Lithuania and, later, under the rule of the Russian Empire. However, diplomatic relations between the contemporary states were established only on 24 October 1991, shortly after the dissolution of the Soviet Union. The two countries share 680 kilometres (420 mi) of common border.

== History ==
=== Until the 20th century ===
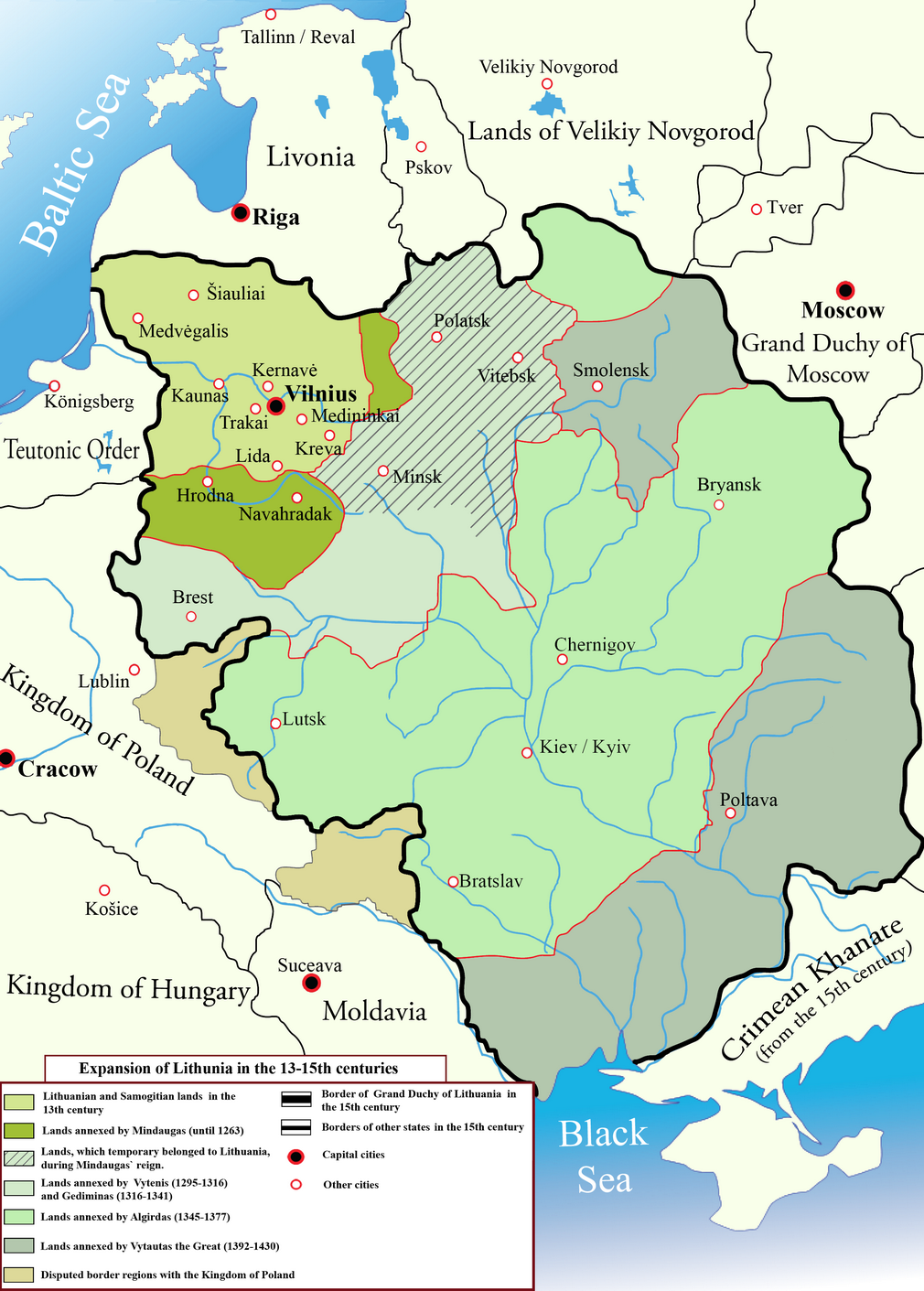
Changes in the territory of Lithuania from the 13th to 15th century. At its peak, Lithuania was the largest state in Europe encompassing the entire territory of modern-day neighboring Belarus.

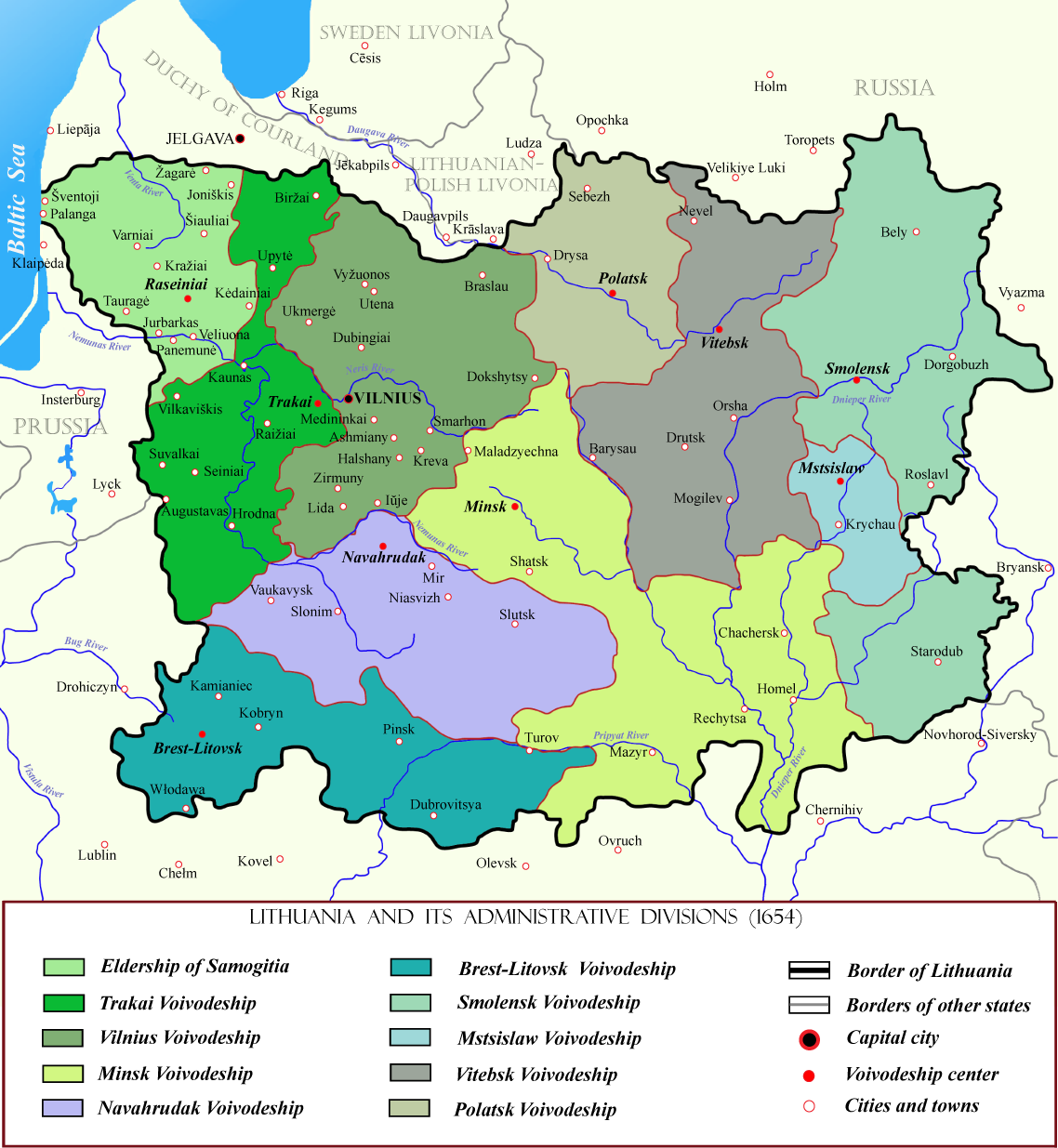
Lithuania in the 17th century within the Polish-Lithuanian Commonwealth. Lithuania's territory was almost identical to its modern-day borders with Belarus.

The relations between ancestors of Belarusians and Lithuanians (Eastern Slavs and Balts) have been developing since ancient times; their close communication is shown by archaeological and linguistic data. From the 13th century to the end of the 14th century in the current territory of Belarus, the former principalities of Polotsk, Minsk, Turov and others were annexed by the expanding Grand Duchy of Lithuania. The Slavic provinces of Lithuania were called "Lithuanian Ruthenia" (Litovskaja Rus). From 1569 to 1772, three of the nine Lithuanian voivodeships were ethnically Lithuanian with the remaining six being Belarusian. Belarusian and Lithuanian nobles, partly townsmen and peasants, together defended the Grand duchy and participated in the liberation movement, especially in the uprisings of 1830-31 and 1863-64. Throughout the 19th century in both states, the Polish-speaking nobility remained, but cherished the cultural and political traditions of the former Lithuanian state. From the 19th century to the early-20th century, joint social democratic organizations operated in Lithuania and Belarus.

=== First half of the 20th century ===
In 1918, Lithuania was one of the first countries to recognize the independence of Belarus. After its territory was occupied by the Red Army in 1918, the Belarusian government in exile operated for some time in the temporary capital of Lithuania, Kaunas. According to an agreement between Lithuania and Belarus, the Grodno region was given to Lithuania, and Belarusian units formed there took part in the Lithuanian independence struggle. There were six Belarusian representatives in the Council of Lithuania.

Following the Soviet invasion of Poland at the start of World War II, in 1939, the elections to the People's Assembly of Western Belorussia were held in Soviet-occupied north-eastern Poland (Western Belorussia) and eventually the deputies voted to unite Western Belorussia with Eastern Belorussia and the Soviet Union. Nevertheless, 10 Lithuanians, who were elected to the People's Assembly of Western Belorussia, initially voted against the unification of Western Belorussia with Eastern Belorussia and explained that they instead want to unite with the Republic of Lithuania, thus the voting had to be repeated.

On 3 August 1940, the Supreme Soviet of the Soviet Union adopted a decree to transfer Sviancianski rajon and territories inhabited by the Lithuanians in Vidzy, Adutiškis, Astravyets, Voranava, and Radun districts from the Byelorussian Soviet Socialist Republic to the sovietized Lithuania. On 1–2 October 1940, negotiations were held in Grodno between the Lithuanian and Belarusian communists. The Lithuanians received less territories than they were appointed by the Supreme Soviet Decree of 3 August 1940 and on 6 November 1940 the Supreme Soviet of the Soviet Union adopted a new decree regarding the borders of the Byelorussian SSR and the Lithuanian Soviet Socialist Republic. The Byelorussian SSR transferred cities and surroundings of Švenčionys, Dieveniškės, Druskininkai to the Lithuanian SSR that were mostly inhabited by Lithuanians and the Lithuanians began administrating them in January 1941. According to a 26 September 1940 meeting protocol of the Central Committee of the Communist Party of Byelorussia, Panteleimon Ponomarenko, the First Secretary of the Communist Party of Byelorussia, narrated during the meeting that previously he discussed with the Soviet dictator Joseph Stalin the issue of the territorial transfers between the Byelorussian SSR and the Lithuanian SSR and Stalin said to him that if he will not transfer territories where there are many Lithuanians he will be punished.

=== After the restoration of independence ===
On 20 December 1991, the Supreme Council of Lithuania recognized the independence of Belarus, with the same happening vice versa seven days later. On 30 December 1992, an agreement on diplomatic relations was signed in Minsk. The Belarus–Lithuania border is defined by a February 1995 treaty, with the ground demarcation of the border being completed in 2007. Belarusian President Alexander Lukashenko made two official visits to Lithuania in 1995 and September 2009. On 27 October 2010, President Dalia Grybauskaitė became the first ever Lithuanian head of state to visit the Belarusian capital of Minsk, as well as the second leader of an EU member nation to visit Belarus (Italian Prime Minister Silvio Berlusconi was the first). In April 2020, Lithuanian President Gitanas Nausėda and Lukashenko had the first tête-à-tête conversation in 10 years. In May 2019, former president and Member of the European Parliament Rolandas Paksas paid a visit to Belarus for the first time in an official capacity, discussing proposals to stabilize the military-political situation in the Baltic Sea.

=== Rifts in relations ===
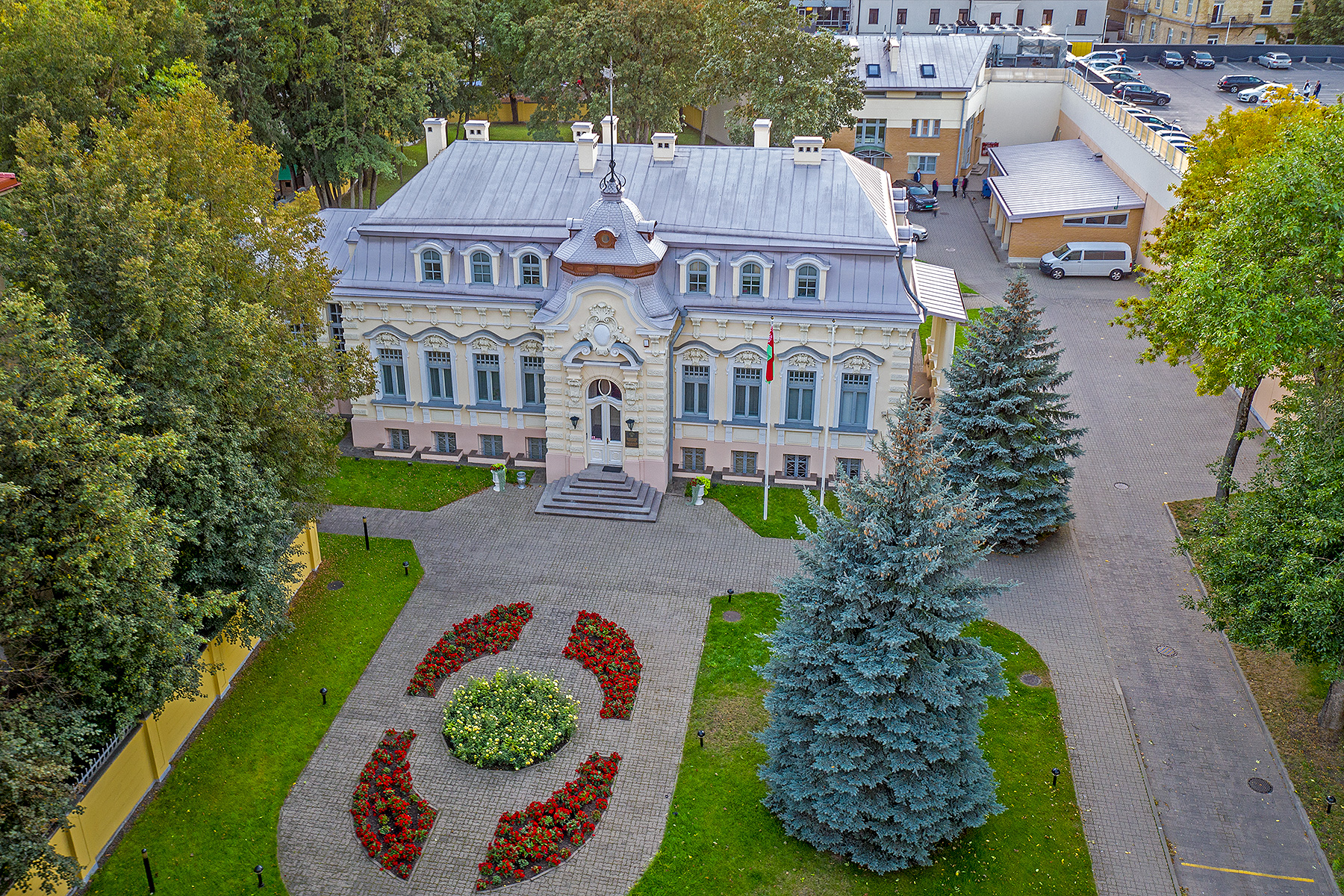
Belarus embassy in Vilnius

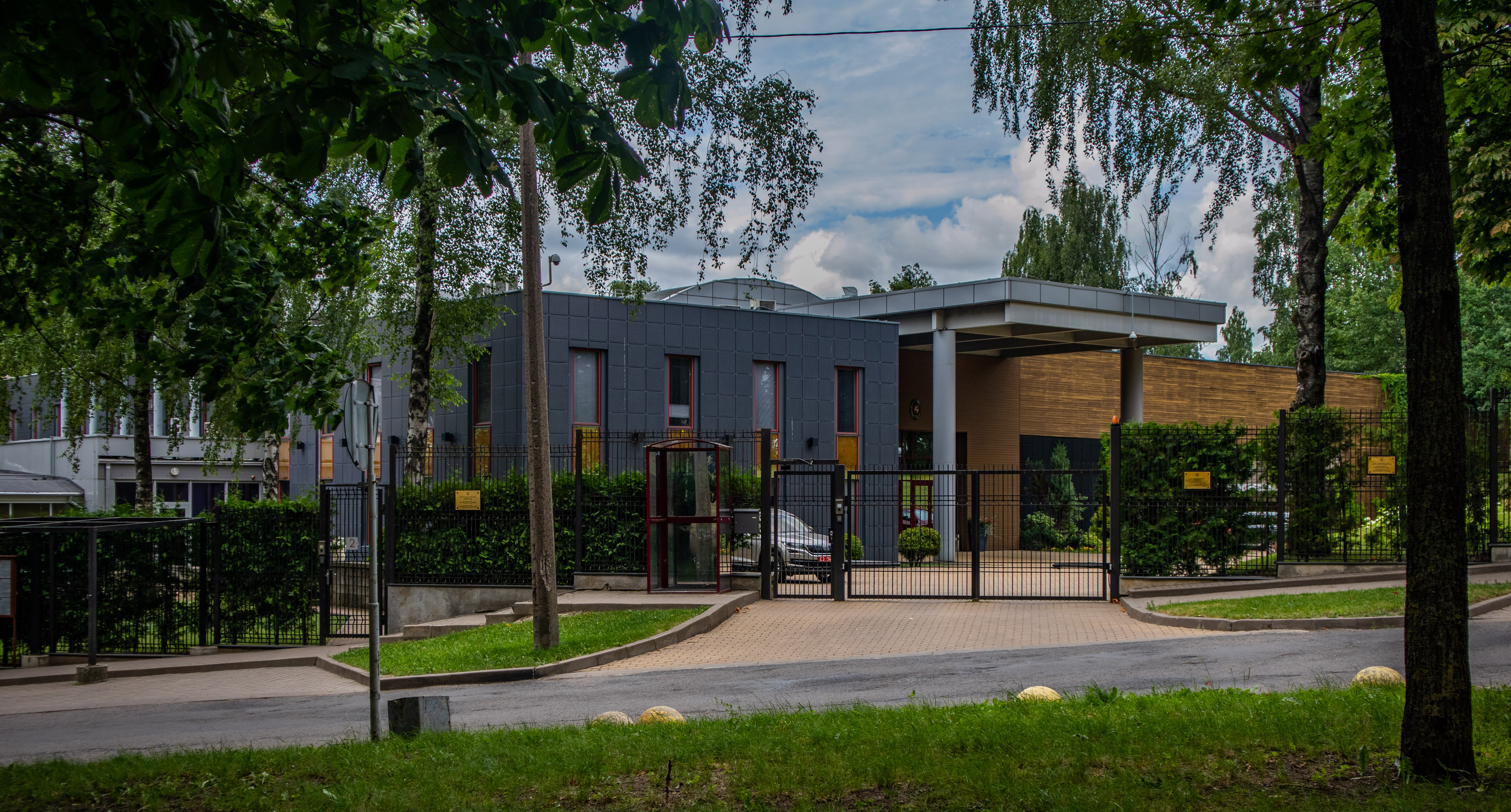
Embassy of Lithuania in Minsk

Each country hosts opposition figures for the other, with Belarus sheltering coup-leader Vladimir Uskhopchik and Lithuania harboring Belarusian opposition figures. Lithuania has attempted to encourage a European orientation in Belarusian leadership, and has pursued trade deals and cooperation among law enforcement agencies. Sharing of information led to the arrest of Belarusian human-rights activist Ales Bialiatski, resulting in European condemnation of both countries.

Lithuania has been a vocal critic of the Astravets Nuclear Power Plant which was built close to the Lithuanian capital Vilnius. On 7 February 2019, the Meeting of the Parties at the Espoo Convention decided that Belarus had violated the convention in choosing a construction site for its nuclear power plant.

Following the Lukashenko government's crackdown after the disputed 2020 Belarus presidential elections, which were widely regarded as unfree and unfair, Belarusian opposition candidate Sviatlana Tsikhanouskaya fled to Lithuania. On 12 August Lithuania opened its borders to all Belarusians for humanitarian purposes due to the crackdown on protests. Two days later on August 14, Lithuania became the first EU state to openly reject the legitimacy of Alexander Lukashenko as the President of Belarus. Lithuanian President Gitanas Nausėda said "We can not call Mr. Lukashenko legitimate because there were no free democratic elections in Belarus".

Following the Ryanair Flight 4978 incident on 23 May 2021, during which Belarus officials arrested two passengers, opposition activist and journalist Roman Protasevich and his girlfriend Sofia Sapega, the relations between the countries have further deteriorated. On 25 May 2021, the Lithuanian parliament announced a ban for all flights from and to Lithuania via Belarus airspace.

Belarus is reported to be the main source (93%) of illegally smuggled cigarettes in Lithuania.

=== 2021 migrant crisis ===
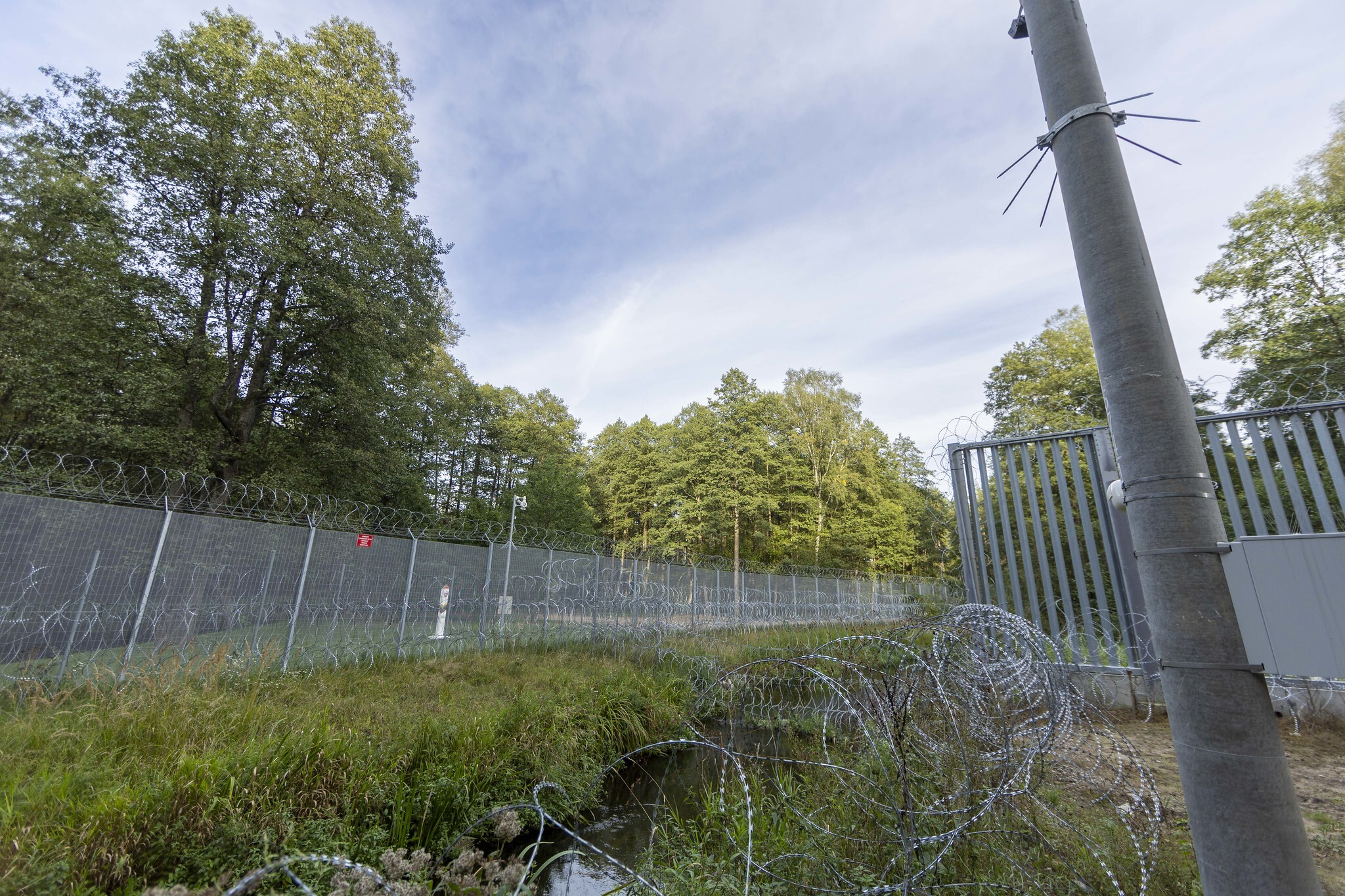
Border barrier built by Lithuania in 2022

In June 2021, Lithuanian officials claimed that Belarusian authorities could encourage illegal migration from Iraq and Syria to Lithuania by organizing groups of refugees and helping them to cross the Belarusian-Lithuanian border. State-owned travel company Tsentrkurort was named as one of the performers of illegal migration. A number of roomy planes from Bagdad and Istanbul full of possible migrants were said to land in Minsk airport. Belarusian independent journalists checked the airport and claimed that the majority of passengers arrived from Iraq and Turkey were men aged 30–50 who were met by two travel agencies. It was assumed that the state support of illegal migration could be carried out for political reasons. On 7 July 2021, Lithuania declared a state of emergency due to the influx of migrants from Belarus. A statement by Alexander Lukashenko about the possible emergence of armed migrants was considered to be a threat.

According to an investigation by Lithuanian broadcaster LRT, the most frequent category of migrants, Iraqi Kurds, claimed that they were told that entering the European Union via Belarus is legal. After a few days in Belarusian hotels, migrants were collected, taken to the border and set the direction of movement on foot claiming that the car will wait for them in Lithuania. It was reported that they paid up to €15,000 for travel and a US$3,000–4,000 deposit. According to the investigation of Belarusian reform.by, people from the Middle East believed that they should destroy their passport to avoid deportation from the EU. Anonymous sources among Belarusian border guards claimed that their bosses started to encourage cigarette smuggling via checkpoints and to encourage gaps in border cover. Another border guard told reform.by about receiving a verbal order to turn a blind eye to illegal migrants.

In July 2021, Lithuanian Seimas passed a law (signed by president Gitanas Nausėda on 21 July) making deportation of illegal migrants from Lithuania easier.

| Year | Number of illegal migrants crossed Belarus—Lithuania border |
|---|---|
| 2017 | 72 |
| 2018 | 104 |
| 2019 | 46 |
| 2020 | 81 |
| 2021 (1 January — 25 July) | 2603 |

By August 2022, more than 13,000 people had been pushed back to Belarus since August 2021 and a 502km long 4m high fence with razor wire along the border had been completed.

=== After Russian invasion of Ukraine ===
On 18 January 2023, Lithuanian government renounced the agreement signed with Belarus on the principles of cross-border cooperation. The bill terminated the agreement signed by the governments of Lithuania and Belarus in Vilnius on June 1, 2006, to set out areas of cross-border cooperation between the two neighbouring countries.

One of the two rail crossings was closed in February 2023 because of excessive smuggling from Belarus to Lithuania and Kaliningrad.

In August 2023, following a survey, Lithuania announced that 254 Russian and 910 Belarusian citizens living in Lithuania posed a threat to national security and that their residence permits will be revoked.

Two of the six road border crossings were closed by Lithuania on 18 August 2023 due to concerns over Wagner Group mercenaries and smuggling.

In 2020, tens of thousands of people from Belarus emigrated to Lithuania, including IT companies and all their staff, being granted temporary permits to live in Lithuania. Three years later, these permits were up for renewal, and because Belarus was seen as complicit in the invasion of Ukraine, renewal questionnaires asked about politics, military service and who is responsible for the war. Vetting is also undertaken by the state security service. Overall around 10% of applications were rejected.

== Cultural links ==
Vilnius hosts multiple Belarusian civil society organizations, such as the European Humanities University. Belarusian refugees such as Sviatlana Tsikhanouskaya have fled to Lithuania. The two countries also share some national heroes, like Konstanty Kalinowski, and the Grand Duchy of Lithuania was the birthplace of Belarusian literature (due to Francysk Skaryna). Vilnius is the closest capital of an EU member state to Minsk. It is also the primary foreign shopping and air transit hub (via Vilnius and Kaunas airports) for Belarusians from Minsk and beyond. Minsk is the foundational place of Belarusian Lithuanian community organization, 1996. In 1998, Lithuanian culture and art days were held here. In 2004, a Lithuanian school-course was established. In September 4 2005, the Belarusian Lithuanian Community Congress took place in Minsk. On the initiative of the Lithuanian association, Vytis, founded in 2012 (chairman Vladas Bublevičius), a Lithuanian language school for children has been held in the premises of the Lithuanian Embassy since 2013, with courses for adults held at the Maksim Tank Belarusian State Pedagogical University. In 2014, an evening of poetry and songs called My Lithuania was organized at the Republican Center for National Cultures. Since November 2019, a Lithuanian Sunday school has been operating in the Lithuanian language office of the Belarusian State Pedagogical University named after Maksim Tank. Grodno is a popular foreign shopping and tourism location for many Lithuanians due to its close proximity to the Lithuanian border and overall historical importance to Lithuania.

== Resident diplomatic missions ==
- Belarus has an embassy in Vilnius and a consulate-general in Klaipėda.
- Lithuania has an embassy in Minsk and a consulate-general in Grodno.

== See also ==
- Foreign relations of Belarus
- Foreign relations of Lithuania
- Belarusians in Lithuania
- Litvinism
- Lithuanians in Belarus
