= List of highways numbered 11 =

Route 11, or Highway 11 can refer to routes in the following countries:

== International ==
- AH11 Asian Highway 11
- E11 European route E11
- E011 European route E011

== Argentina ==
- Buenos Aires Provincial Route 11

== Australia ==
=== Queensland ===
- Suttor Developmental Road (Queensland)

=== South Australia ===
- South Australia

=== Tasmania ===
- Marlborough Highway

=== Victoria ===
- Mornington Peninsula Freeway
- Peninsula Link

=== Decommissioned ===
- - Pacific Highway - Parts of the Pacific Highway at Pearces Corner was numbered A11 for NorthConnex but was removed shortly after

== Austria ==
- Karawanken Autobahn

== Belarus ==
- M 11 M11 highway (Belarus)

== Bulgaria ==
- Републикански път I-11

== Cambodia ==
- National Highway 11 (Cambodia)

== Canada ==
- Alberta Highway 11
- British Columbia Highway 11
- Manitoba Highway 11
- New Brunswick Route 11
- Newfoundland and Labrador Route 11
- Ontario Highway 11
- Quebec Route 11 (former)
- Prince Edward Island Route 11
- Saskatchewan Highway 11
- Yukon Highway 11

== China ==
- G11 Expressway

== Cuba ==
- Highway 4–I–11
- Highway 3–11

== Czech Republic ==
- D11 motorway (Czech Republic)
- I/11 Highway; Czech: Silnice I/11

== Djibouti ==
- RN-11 (Djibouti)

== Finland ==
- Finnish national road 11

== Greece ==
- A11 motorway

== India ==
- NH 11

== Iran ==
- Road 11

== Iraq ==
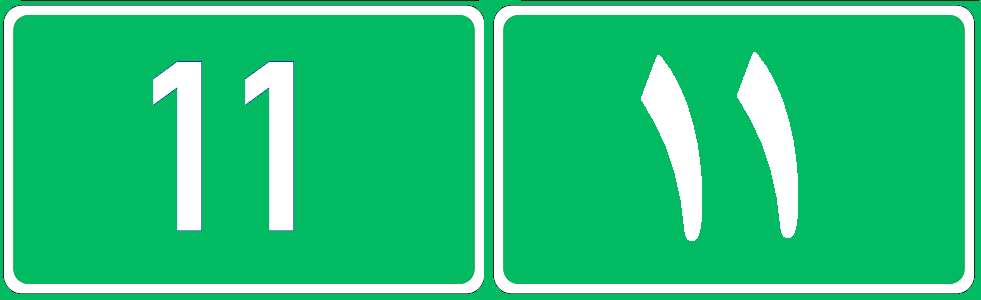
- Highway 11 (Iraq)

== Ireland ==
- M11 motorway (Republic of Ireland)
- N11 road (Ireland)

== Italy ==
- Autostrada A11
- RA 11

== Japan ==
- Japan National Route 11
- Matsuyama Expressway
- Takamatsu Expressway
- Tokushima Expressway
- Hanshin Expressway Ikeda Route
- Route 11 (Nagoya Expressway)

== Malaysia ==
- Damansara–Puchong Expressway
- FT 11 Malaysia Federal Route 11
- A11 Jalan Sungai Temong
- B11 Jalan Kajang–Puchong
- J11 Johor State Route J11

== New Zealand ==
- New Zealand State Highway 11

== Nigeria ==
- A11 highway (Nigeria)

== Paraguay ==
- National Route 11

== Philippines ==
- N11 highway (Philippines)

== Romania ==
- A11 - Motorway

== Russia ==
- M11 highway (Russia)

== South Africa ==
- N11 road (South Africa)

== Sweden ==
- Swedish national road 11

== Thailand ==
- Highway 11 (Thailand)

== United Arab Emirates ==
- E11, a pan-emirate highway which is the longest numbered route in the UAE

== United Kingdom ==
- M11 motorway
- British A11 (London-Norwich)

== United States ==
- Interstate 11
- U.S. Route 11
  - U.S. Route 11 (Texas) (former proposal)
  - U.S. Route 11W
  - U.S. Route 11E
- New England Interstate Route 11 (former)
- Alabama State Route 11 (former)
  - County Route 11 (Lee County, Alabama)
- Alaska Route 11
- Arkansas Highway 11
- California State Route 11
  - County Route A11 (California)
  - County Route E11 (California)
  - County Route G11 (California)
  - County Route J11 (California)
  - County Route S11 (California)
- Colorado State Highway 11
- Connecticut Route 11
- Delaware Route 11
- Florida State Road 11
- Georgia State Route 11
- Hawaii Route 11
- Idaho State Highway 11
- Illinois Route 11
- Indiana State Road 11
- Kentucky Route 11
- Maine State Route 11
- Massachusetts Route 11 (former)
- M-11 (Michigan highway)
- Minnesota State Highway 11
  - County Road 11 (Dakota County, Minnesota)
  - County Road 11 (Goodhue County, Minnesota)
- Missouri Route 11
- Nebraska Highway 11
- Nevada State Route 11 (former)
- New Hampshire Route 11
  - New Hampshire Route 11D
- New Jersey Route 11 (former)
  - New Jersey Route 11N (former)
  - County Route 11 (Monmouth County, New Jersey)
- New Mexico State Road 11
- New York State Route 11 (1924–1927) (former)
  - County Route 11 (Albany County, New York)
  - County Route 11 (Allegany County, New York)
  - County Route 11 (Chenango County, New York)
  - County Route 11 (Clinton County, New York)
  - County Route 11 (Columbia County, New York)
  - County Route 11 (Delaware County, New York)
  - County Route 11 (Erie County, New York)
  - County Route 11 (Essex County, New York)
  - County Route 11 (Genesee County, New York)
  - County Route 11 (Lewis County, New York)
  - County Route 11 (Madison County, New York)
  - County Route 11 (Monroe County, New York)
  - County Route 11 (Niagara County, New York)
  - County Route 11 (Oneida County, New York)
  - County Route 11 (Ontario County, New York)
  - County Route 11 (Orange County, New York)
  - County Route 11 (Otsego County, New York)
  - County Route 11 (Putnam County, New York)
  - County Route 11 (Rockland County, New York)
  - County Route 11 (Schoharie County, New York)
  - County Route 11 (Schuyler County, New York)
  - County Route 11 (Steuben County, New York)
  - County Route 11 (Suffolk County, New York)
  - County Route 11 (Sullivan County, New York)
  - County Route 11 (Tioga County, New York)
  - County Route 11 (Ulster County, New York)
  - County Route 11 (Warren County, New York)
  - County Route 11 (Wyoming County, New York)
- North Carolina Highway 11
- North Dakota Highway 11
- Ohio State Route 11
- Oklahoma State Highway 11
- Oregon Route 11
- Pennsylvania Route 11 (1920s) (former)
- Rhode Island Route 11
- South Carolina Highway 11
- South Dakota Highway 11
- Tennessee State Route 11
- Texas State Highway 11
  - Texas State Highway Loop 11
  - Farm to Market Road 11
  - Texas Park Road 11
  - Texas Recreational Road 11
- Utah State Route 11 (1910-1977) (former)
- Vermont Route 11
- Virginia State Route 11 (former)
- Washington State Route 11
  - Washington State Highway 11 (former)
- West Virginia Route 11 (1920s) (former)
- Wisconsin Highway 11
- Wyoming Highway 11

Territories

- Guam Highway 11

== Uruguay ==
- Route 11 José Batlle y Ordóñez / Ing. Eladio Dieste

== Zambia ==
- M11 road (Zambia)

== See also ==
- List of A11 roads
- List of highways numbered 11A
- List of highways numbered 11B
- List of highways numbered 11C

Preceded by 10	Lists of highways 11	Succeeded by 12
