= 11C =

11C, 11-C or 11.C may refer to:

- New York State Route 11C
- GCR Class 11C, a class of British 4-4-0 steam locomotive
- 11C, a U.S. Army MOS for a mortarman
- The clockwise bus service on West Midlands bus route 11
- Carbon-11 (^{11}C), an isotope of carbon

== See also ==
- Secondary State Highway 11C (disambiguation)
- C11 (disambiguation)
