= M11 highway (Belarus) =

Major road in Belarus

M11
- Магістраль М11

Route information
- Part of E85
- Length: 191 km (119 mi)

Major junctions
- North end: Border of Lithuania
- South end: Intersection with P 2

Location
- Country: Belarus
- Major cities: Lida, Slonim

Highway system
- Roads in Belarus

The М11 highway in Belarus is a part of European route E85. Being 185 km long, it stretches through Hrodna Voblast and part of Brest Voblast in Belarus. The road begins at the Benyakoni border crossing (it is a continuation of Lithuanian A15 highway) and goes south, passing Voranava, Lida, Dyatlovo and Slonim. It ends at the intersection with M1 near Brest.

Distance (approx.)	Name	Other roads
	Lithuania	A 15 / E85
0 km	Benyakoni border crossing	
11 km	Voranava	
18 km	Voranava	
24 km		P 135
40 km	Lida	
49 km	Lida	P 89
56 km	Lida	
59 km		M 6
67 km		P 11
81 km		P 141
104 km	Dyatlovo	P 10 P 108
116 km		P 142
125 km	Kazlowshchyna	
152 km	Slonim	P 41 P 85 P 99
158 km	Slonim	P 99
191 km		P 2 E85
