= A15 highway (Lithuania) =

Road in Lithuania

A15
- Vilnius – Šalčininkai

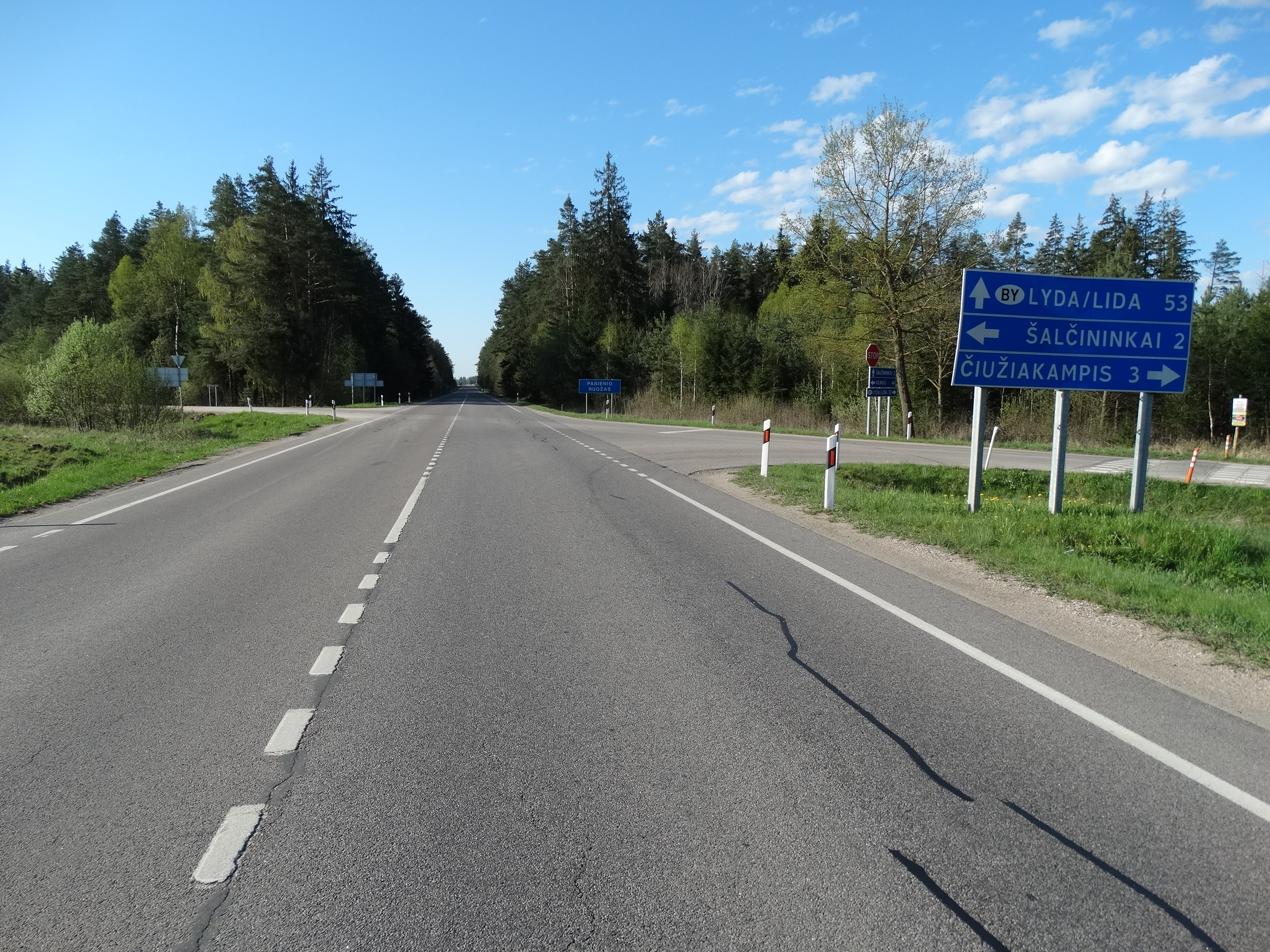
- Highway near Šalčininkai

Route information
- Length: 49.28 km (30.62 mi)

Major junctions
- From: Vilnius
- To: Šalčininkai; Belarus E85 / M 11

Location
- Country: Lithuania

Highway system
- Transport in Lithuania

The A15 highway is a highway in Lithuania (Magistraliniai keliai). It runs from Vilnius to the Belarusian border near Šalčininkai. From there it continues to Lida as M 11. The length of the road is around 49 km.
