= A11 =

A11, A 11 or A-11 may refer to:

== Military ==
- Aero A.11, a Czechoslovak bomber produced before World War II
- Consolidated A-11, an attack version of the Consolidated P-30 fighter plane of the 1930s
- HMS A11, an A-class submarine of the Royal Navy
- Matilda Mk I, a British Army infantry tank
- Aggregate 11, a proposed military rocket of Nazi Germany
- A-11 Ghibli, the Italian designation for the AMX International AMX

== Other uses ==
- A11 road, in several countries
- Apollo 11
- A-11 offense, an American Football shotgun formation involving 2 quarterbacks and 9 other potentially eligible receivers
- Arrows A11, a 1989 British racing car
- ATC code A11 Vitamins, a subgroup of the Anatomical Therapeutic Chemical Classification System
- British NVC community A11 (Potamogeton pectinatus - Myriophyllum spicatum community), a British Isles plant community
- Chery A11, a 1999 Chinese car
- HLA-A11, an HLA-A serotype
- American Airlines Flight 11, a plane that was hijacked and crashed into the World Trade Center in the September 11 attacks
- English Opening, Encyclopaedia of Chess Openings code
- Apple A11, an ARM SoC mobile processor designed by Apple
- Samsung Galaxy A11, an Android device developed by Samsung Electronics
- Samsung Galaxy Tab A11, a lineup of Android-based tablets
- "A-11" (song), a 1963 country song written by Hank Cochran

== See also ==
- 11A (disambiguation)
