= List of A11 roads =

This is a list of roads designated A11. Roads entries are sorted in the countries alphabetical order.

- A011 road (Argentina), a road connecting the junction of National Route 11 in Clorinda with Puerto Pilcomayo
- A11 road (Australia) may refer to:
  - Lower North East Road, a road connected to National Route A17 (Portrush Road), South Australia
- A11 motorway (Austria), a road connecting Austria with the Karawanken Tunnel to the A2 in Slovenia
- A11 motorway (Croatia), a road connecting Zagreb and Sisak
- A11 motorway (France), a road connecting Paris to Nantes
- A 11 motorway (Germany), a road connecting Berlin and Szczecin
- A11 motorway (Greece), a road connecting Chalkis and Shimatan
- A11 motorway (Italy), a road connecting Florence and Pisa Nord
- A11 road (Malaysia), a road in Perak
- A11 road (Latvia), a road connecting Liepāja and the Lithuanian border
- A11 highway (Lithuania), a road connecting Šiauliai and Palanga
- A11 road (People's Republic of China) may refer to:
  - A11 expressway (Shanghai), a road connecting Zhenbei Road Interchange and Nanjing
- A11 motorway (Portugal), a road connecting Apúlia and Amarante
- A-11 motorway (Spain), a road connecting Soria and Quintanilha, Portugal
- A 11 road (Sri Lanka) a road connecting Maradankadawala and Trikandimadu
- A11 expressway (Switzerland), a road connecting Zürich with its airport
- A11 road (United Kingdom) may refer to:
  - A11 road (England), a road connecting London and Norwich
  - A11 road (Isle of Man) or King Edward road
  - A11 road (Northern Ireland) or Belfast Inner Ring Road
- A11 road (United States of America) may refer to:
  - A11 County route (California), a road connecting Interstate 5 and CR A8
- A11 motorway (Romania), a road planned to connect Arad and Oradea

== See also ==
- List of highways numbered 11
