= 11A =

11A may refer to:

- Freon 11A or trichlorofluoromethane
- New Hampshire Route 11A
- New York State Route 11A
- TG-11A, or Stemme S10, a German glider
- Clayton Municipal Airport (Alabama) (FAA LID: 11A)
- The anticlockwise bus service on West Midlands bus route 11
- 802.11a, an amendment to the IEEE 802.11 wireless local network specifications

== See also ==
- Stalag XI-A, a German Army World War II prisoner-of-war camp near Altengrabow
- A11 (disambiguation)
