= Radun, Belarus =

Radun Радунь
- Urban-type settlement
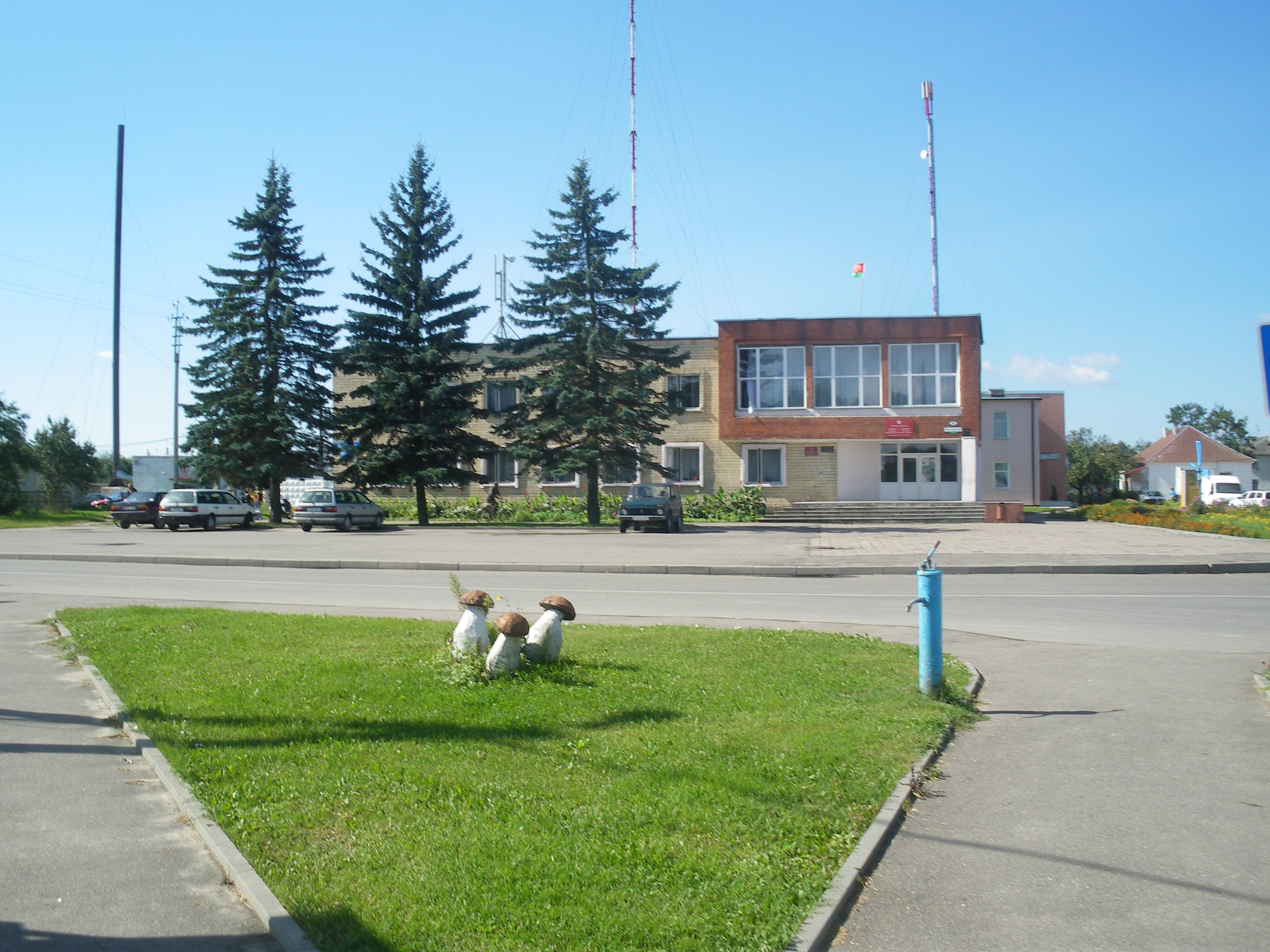

- Flag Coat of arms

- Location within Belarus
- Coordinates: 54°2′53.16″N 24°59′44.88″E
- Country: Belarus
- Region: Grodno Region
- District: Voranava District
- Elevation: 165 m (541 ft)

Population (2025)
  - Total: 2,001
- Time zone: UTC+3 (MSK)
- Postal code: 231390
- Area code: +375 1594
- License plate: 4

Radun (Note: Belarusian: Радунь, romanized: Raduń; Russian: Радунь; Lithuanian: Rodūnia, Rodūnė; Polish: Raduń; Yiddish: ראַדין, romanized: Radin.) is an urban-type settlement in Voranava District, Grodno Region, in western Belarus. As of 2025, it has a population of 2,001.

== History ==
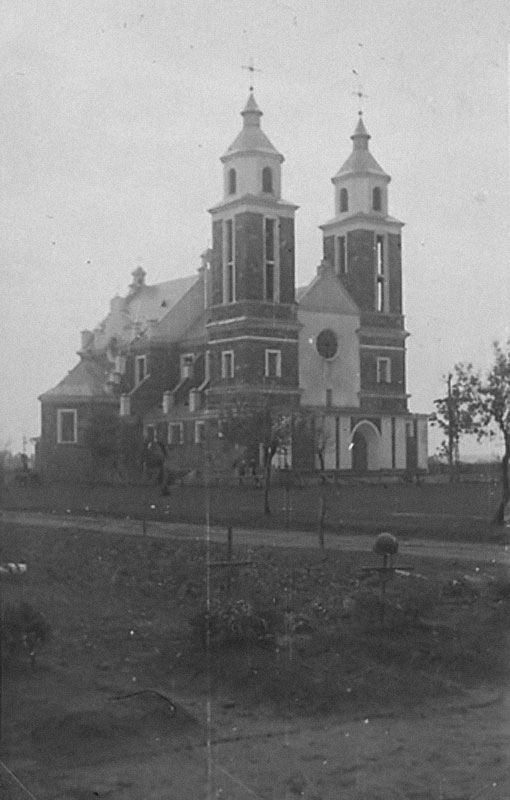
Church of Mother of God of the Rosary in the 1940s

Raduń was a royal town, administratively located in the Lida County in the Vilnius Voivodeship of the Polish–Lithuanian Commonwealth. The shortest 16th-century route connecting Kraków and Vilnius led through the town.

It was the home of Rabbi Yisrael Meir Kagan, known as the Chofetz Chaim, and his Raduń Yeshiva founded in 1869.

Raduń, as it was known in Polish, was administratively located in the Lida County in the Nowogródek Voivodeship of Poland in the interwar period. In the 1921 census, 61.2% people declared Polish nationality, and 38,0% declared Jewish nationality.

After the Invasion of Poland in September 1939, Radun was occupied by the Soviet Union and incorporated into the Byelorussian SSR on 14 November 1939. In 1940, most of the yeshiva students were transferred to the United States via Japan.

From June 1941 until 13 July 1944, Radun was occupied by Germany and administered as a part of the Generalbezirk Weißruthenien of Reichskommissariat Ostland. On November 16, 1941, a fenced ghetto was established on Zhydovska Street, previously a Jewish street. There were also Jews from neighbouring villages gathered in the ghetto: Dovguielishki, Zabolote, Zhyrmuny and Nacha. More than 2,000 Jews were confined inside the ghetto.

On May 10, 1942, 100 young Jews were requisitioned to dig pits in the Jewish cemetery. As the working Jews attempted a mass-escape, many of them were shot. When the ghetto was liquidated, more than 1,500 Jews were killed by the Germans and the local police. Nearly 300 skilled artisans were kept alive, and later sent to Shchuchin ghetto and from there, after a while, to their deaths in an unknown location. As of 2018, there were no Jews living in Radun.

== Demographics ==
Historical population
Year	Pop.	±%
1866	869	—
1881	1,526	+75.6%
1921	1,254	−17.8%
2009	2,673	+113.2%
2024	2,012	−24.7%
2025	2,001	−0.5%

Distribution of the population by ethnicity according to the 2009 Belarusian census:

	percent
Poles	80.88%
Belarusians	10.48%
Russians	2.96%
Romani	2.66%
Lithuanians	2.10%
Ukrainians	0.60%
