= Secondary State Highway 11C =

There were two secondary state highways in Washington numbered 11C:

- Secondary State Highway 11C (Washington 1937-1953), now SR 23 between Steptoe and Sprague
- Secondary State Highway 11C (Washington 1961-1970), now SR 240 west of SR 224
