= Right of Association (Agriculture) Convention =

International Labour Organization Convention

ILO Convention C011
Convention concerning the Rights of Association and Combination of Agricultural Workers
- Signed: 12 November 1921
- Location: Geneva
- Effective: 11 May 1923
- Condition: Ratification by 2 states
- Parties: 123 (2015)
- Depositary: International Labour Organization
- Languages: English and French

The Convention concerning the Rights of Association and Combination of Agricultural Workers is an International Labour Organization Convention adopted in 1921. The convention secures the rights of "association and combination" of agricultural workers to the same extent as those rights are extended to industrial workers.

== Ratifications ==
As of January 2023, 123 states have ratified the convention.
