= Bill C-11 =

Bill C-11 is any of several articles of legislation introduced into the House of Commons of Canada, including:

- Immigration and Refugee Protection Act, introduced in 2001 to the first session of the 37th Parliament
- Copyright Modernization Act, introduced in 2011 to the first session of the 41st Parliament
- Online Streaming Act, introduced in 2022 to the first session of the 44th Parliament
