= List of highways numbered 11C =

The following highways are numbered 11C:

== United States ==
- New Hampshire Route 11C
- New York State Route 11C

== See also ==
- List of highways numbered 11
- 11C (disambiguation)
