= Voranava district =

District of Grodno region, Belarus

Voranava district Воранаўскі раён (Belarusian) Вороновский район (Russian)
- District
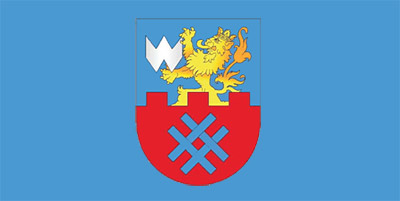
- Flag Coat of arms

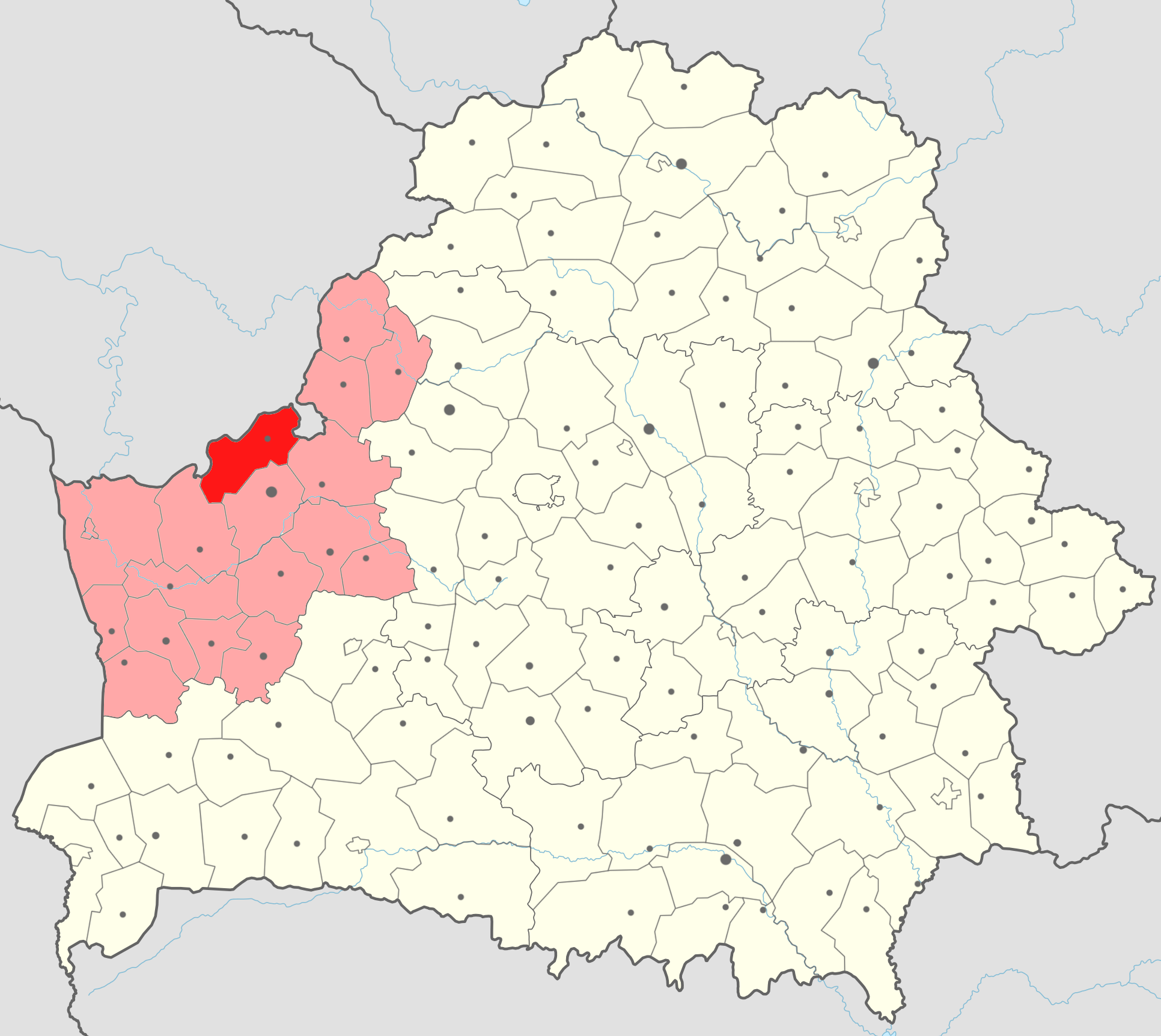
- Coordinates: 54°09′N 25°19′E
- Country: Belarus
- Region: Grodno region
- Administrative center: Voranava

Area
  - District: 1,418.39 km^{2} (547.64 sq mi)

Population (2024)
  - District: 21,114
  - Density: 14.886/km^{2} (38.554/sq mi)
  - Urban: 7,636
  - Rural: 13,478
- Time zone: UTC+3 (MSK)

Voranava district (Belarusian: Воранаўскі раён; Russian: Вороновский район) is a district (raion) of Grodno region in north-western Belarus. Its administrative center is the urban-type settlement of Voranava. As of 2024, it has a population of 21,114.

== Demographics ==
Distribution of the population by ethnicity according to the 2009 census:

| | percent |
| Poles | 80.77% |
| Belarusians | 13% |
| Russians | 3.02% |
| Lithuanians | 1.55% |
| Ukrainians | 0.57% |
| Romani | 0.32% |
| Tatars | 0.07% |
| Armenians | 0.05% |

== Notable residents ==
- Ludwik Narbutt (1832, Šaǔry - 1863), military commander during the January Uprising who led a large unit of insurgents in the region of the town of Lida
