= List of highways numbered 11A =

The following highways are numbered 11A:

== Canada ==
- Ontario Highway 11A - two former stretches of highway within Ontario.

== India ==
- National Highway 11A (India)

== United States ==
- New Hampshire Route 11A
- New York State Route 11A
  - County Route 11A (Otsego County, New York)
  - County Route 11A (Sullivan County, New York)
- Oklahoma State Highway 11A
