= Voranava =

Voranava Воранава (Belarusian) Вороново (Russian)
- Urban-type settlement
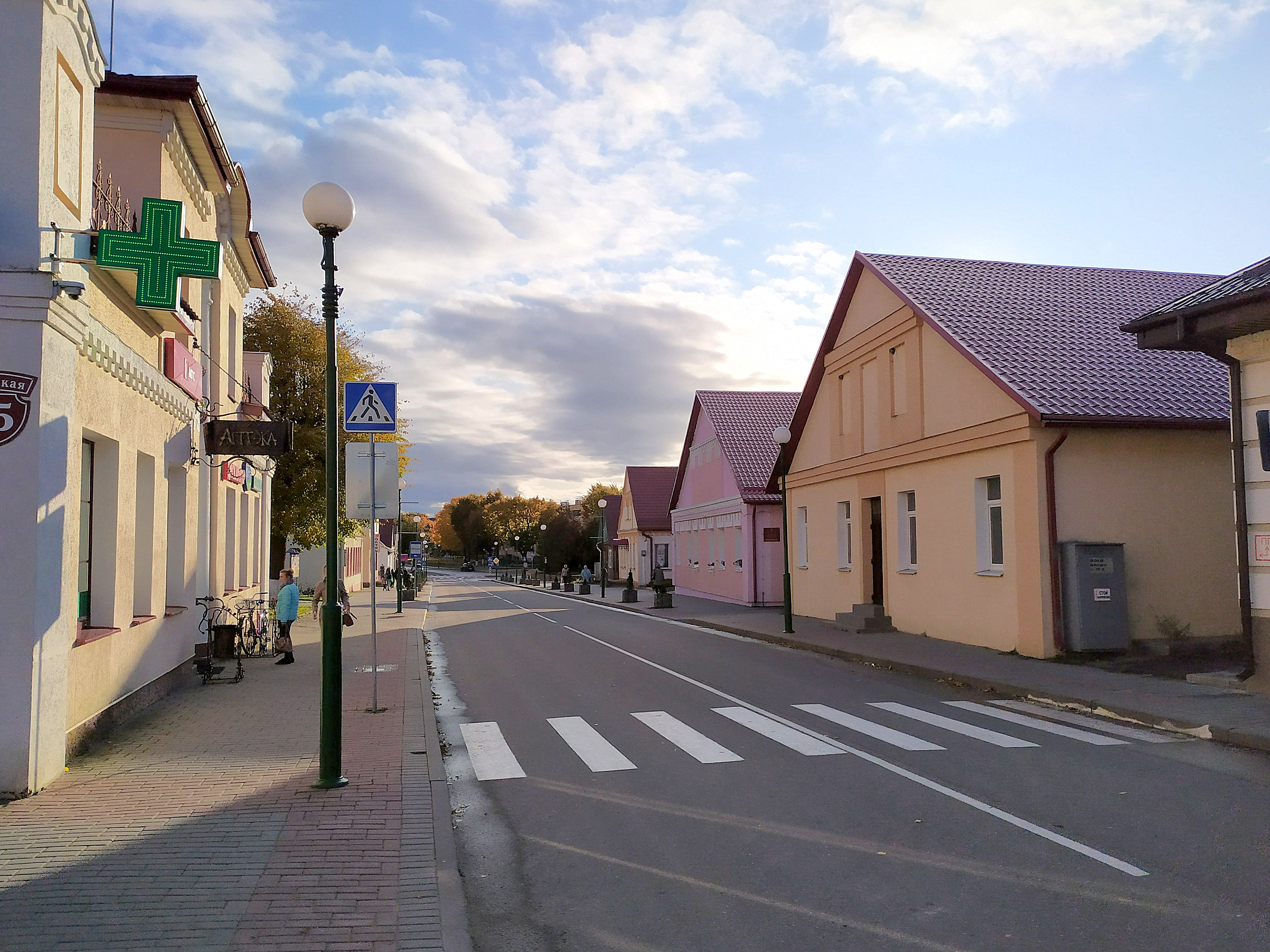

- Flag Coat of arms

- Location within Belarus
- Coordinates: 54°09′N 25°19′E
- Country: Belarus
- Region: Grodno Region
- District: Voranava District
- Elevation: 165 m (541 ft)

Population (2025)
  - Total: 5,532
- Time zone: UTC+3 (MSK)

Voranava or Voronovo (Belarusian: Воранава; Russian: Вороново; Polish: Woronów, Werenowo) is an urban-type settlement in Grodno Region, in western Belarus. It serves as the administrative center of Voranava District. It is located about 32 km (20 mi) from Lida and 13 km (8 mi) from the border with Lithuania. As of 2025, it has a population of 5,532.

== History ==
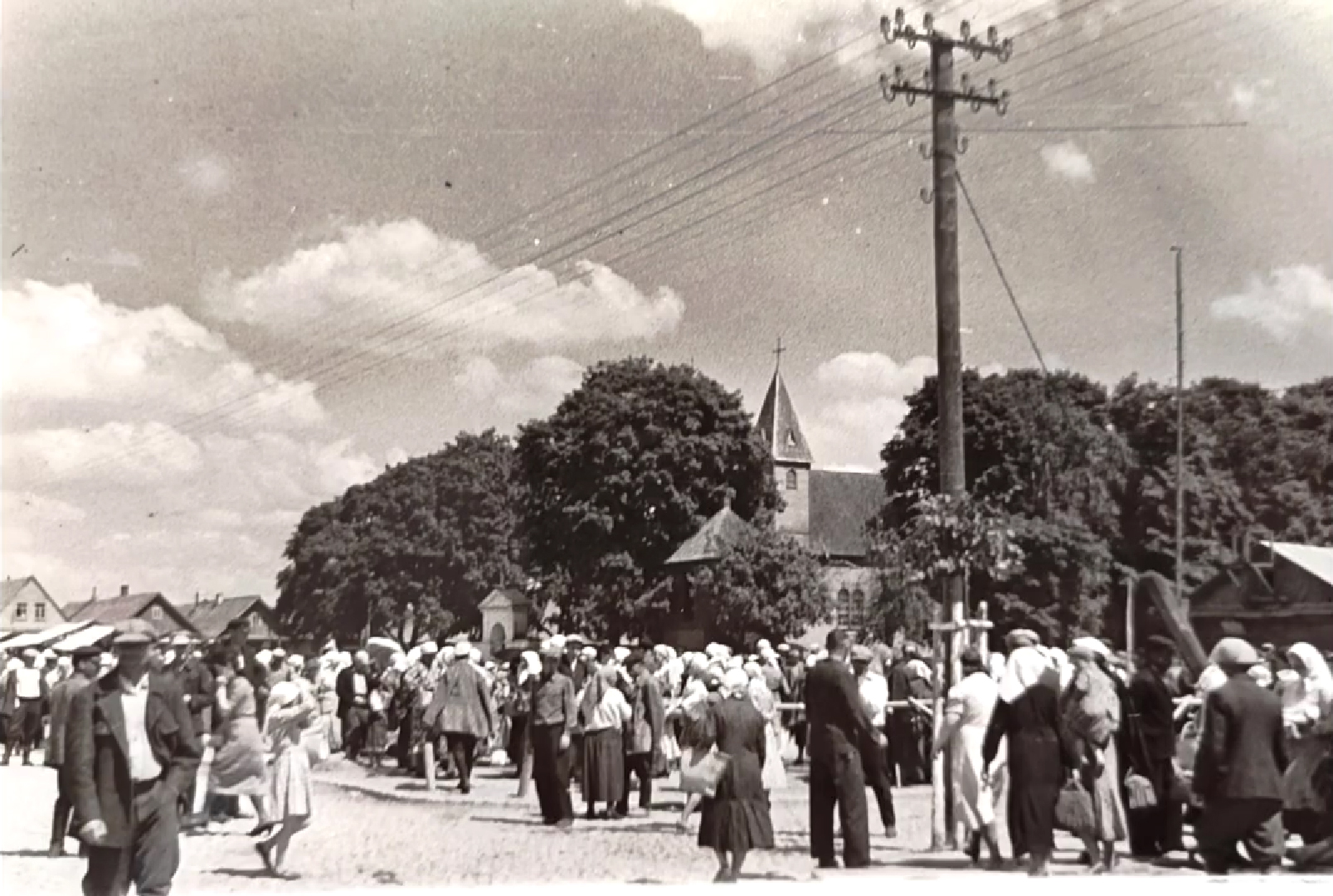
Market in June 1939

Within the Grand Duchy of Lithuania and Polish–Lithuanian Commonwealth, Voranava was part of Vilnius Voivodeship. It was a private town of nobility, including the Goštautai and Scipio del Campo families. Jan Scipio del Campo founded a Piarist college in the town before 1738, which was later moved to Lida. In 1795, the town was annexed by the Russian Empire in the course of the Third Partition of Poland. From 1921 until 1939, Voranava was part of the Second Polish Republic.

During World War II, in September 1939, the town was occupied by the Red Army and, on 14 November 1939, incorporated into the Byelorussian SSR. From 23 June 1941 until 11 July 1944, Voranava was occupied by Nazi Germany and administered as a part of the Generalbezirk Weißruthenien of Reichskommissariat Ostland.

== Population ==
Historical population

Year	Pop.	±%
1865	468	—
1905	500	+6.8%
1921	1,232	+146.4%
1976	3,600	+192.2%
1990	6,800	+88.9%

Year	Pop.	±%
1996	6,700	−1.5%
2004	6,600	−1.5%
2005	6,559	−0.6%
2006	6,498	−0.9%
2007	6,400	−1.5%

Year	Pop.	±%
2009	6,332	−1.1%
2015	6,200	−2.1%
2016	6,434	+3.8%
2023	5,683	−11.7%
2024	5,624	−1.0%

Distribution of the population by ethnicity according to the 2009 census:

	percent
Poles	70.51%
Belarusians	21.35%
Russians	5.64%
Ukrainians	0.92%
Lithuanians	0.3%
Armenians	0.11%

== Gallery ==
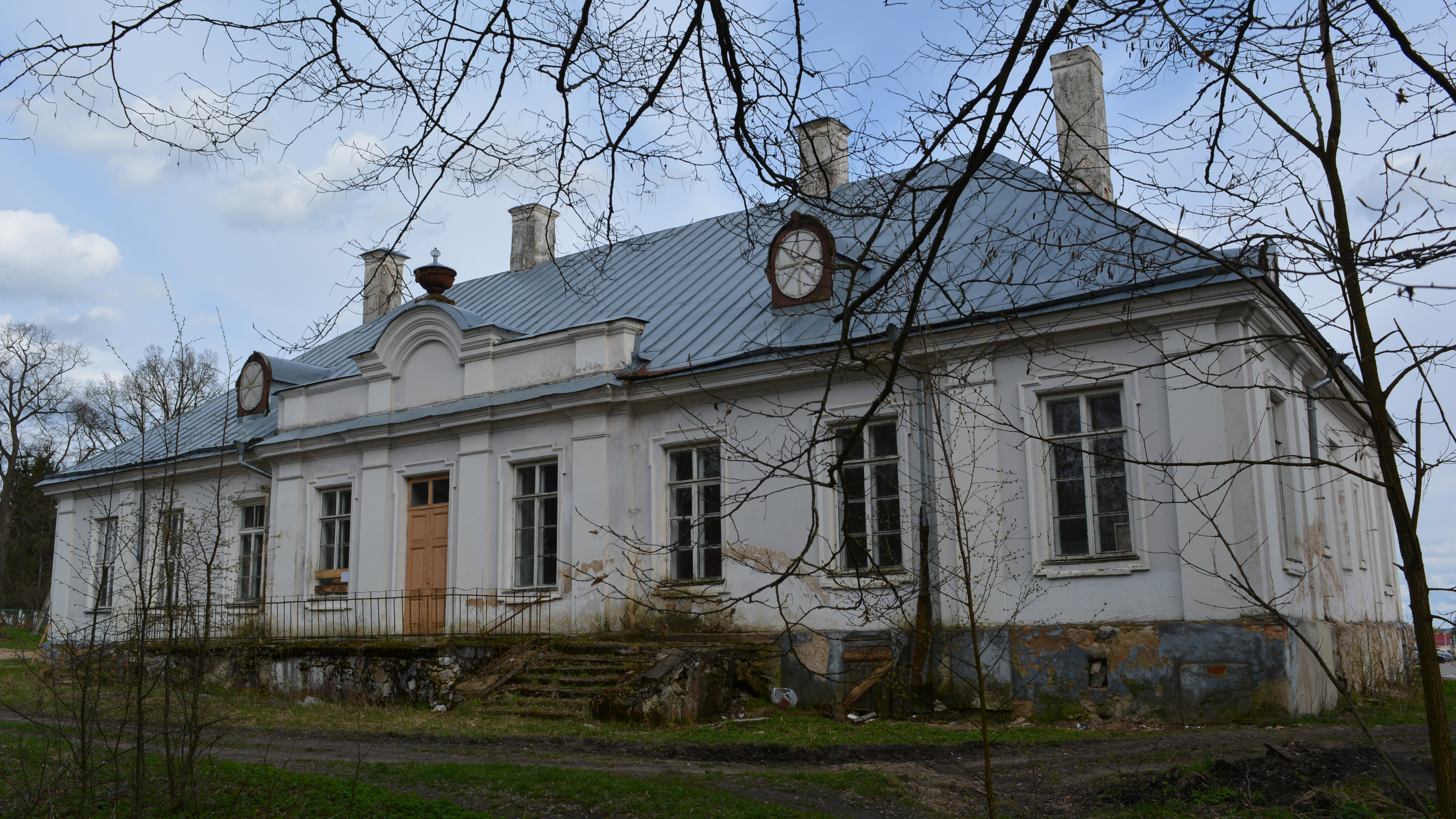
Historic manor of Scipio del Campo (19th century)

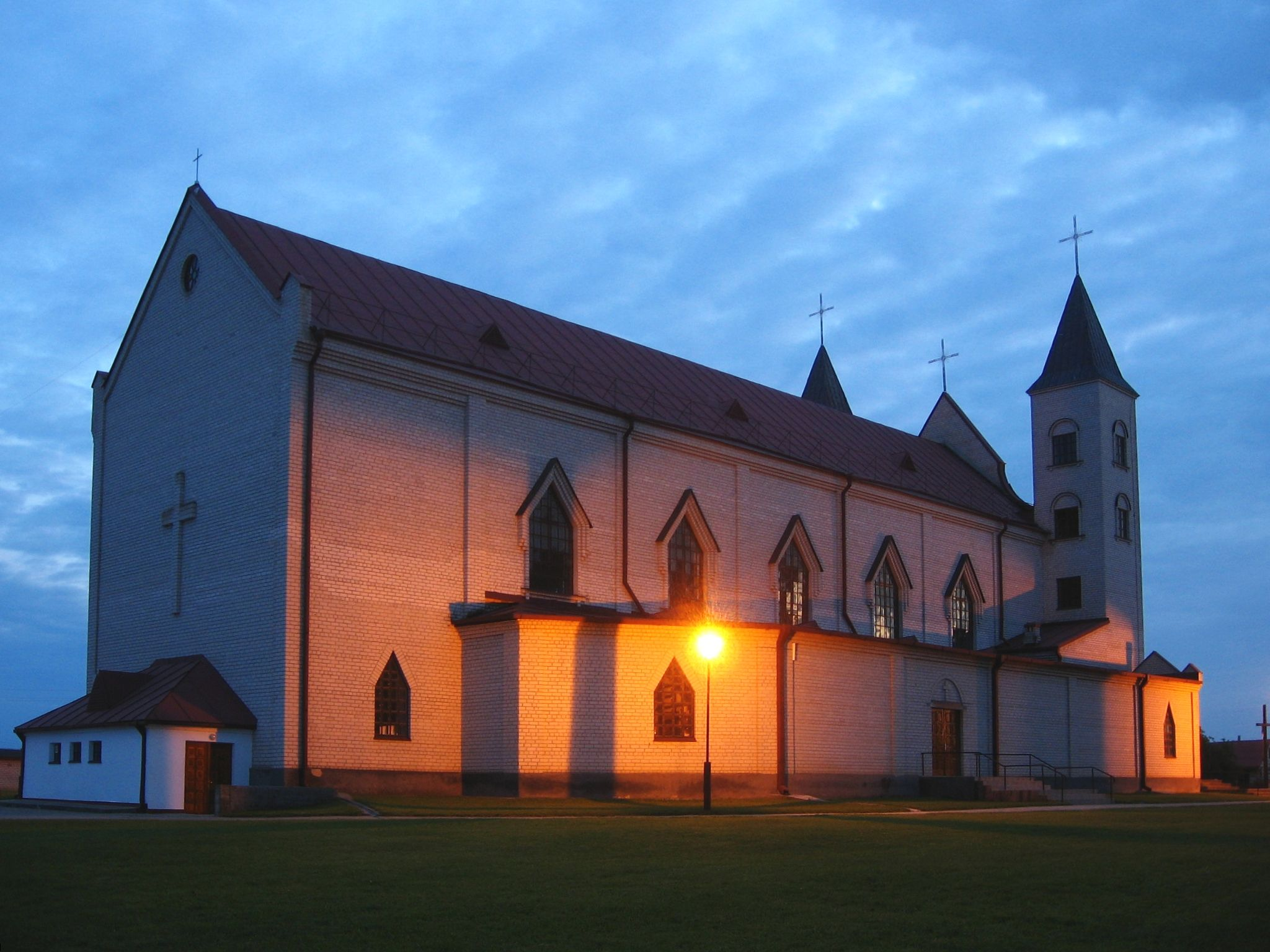
Church of the God's Mercy

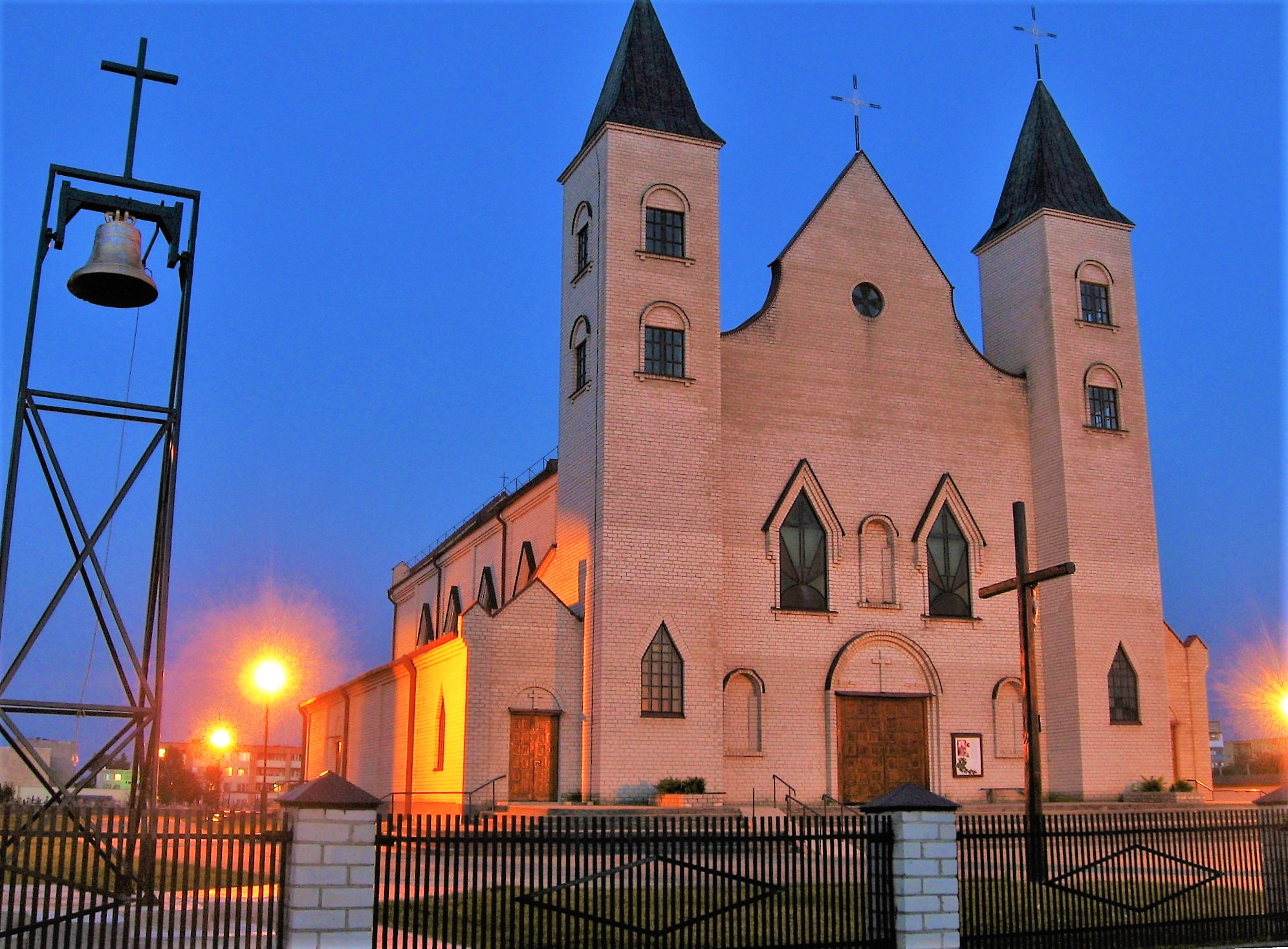
Church of the God's Mercy

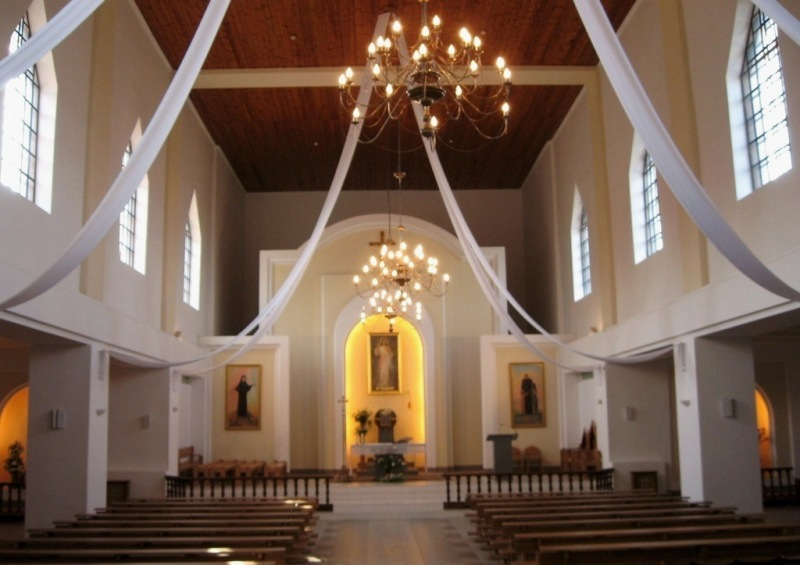
Church of the God's Mercy inner interior

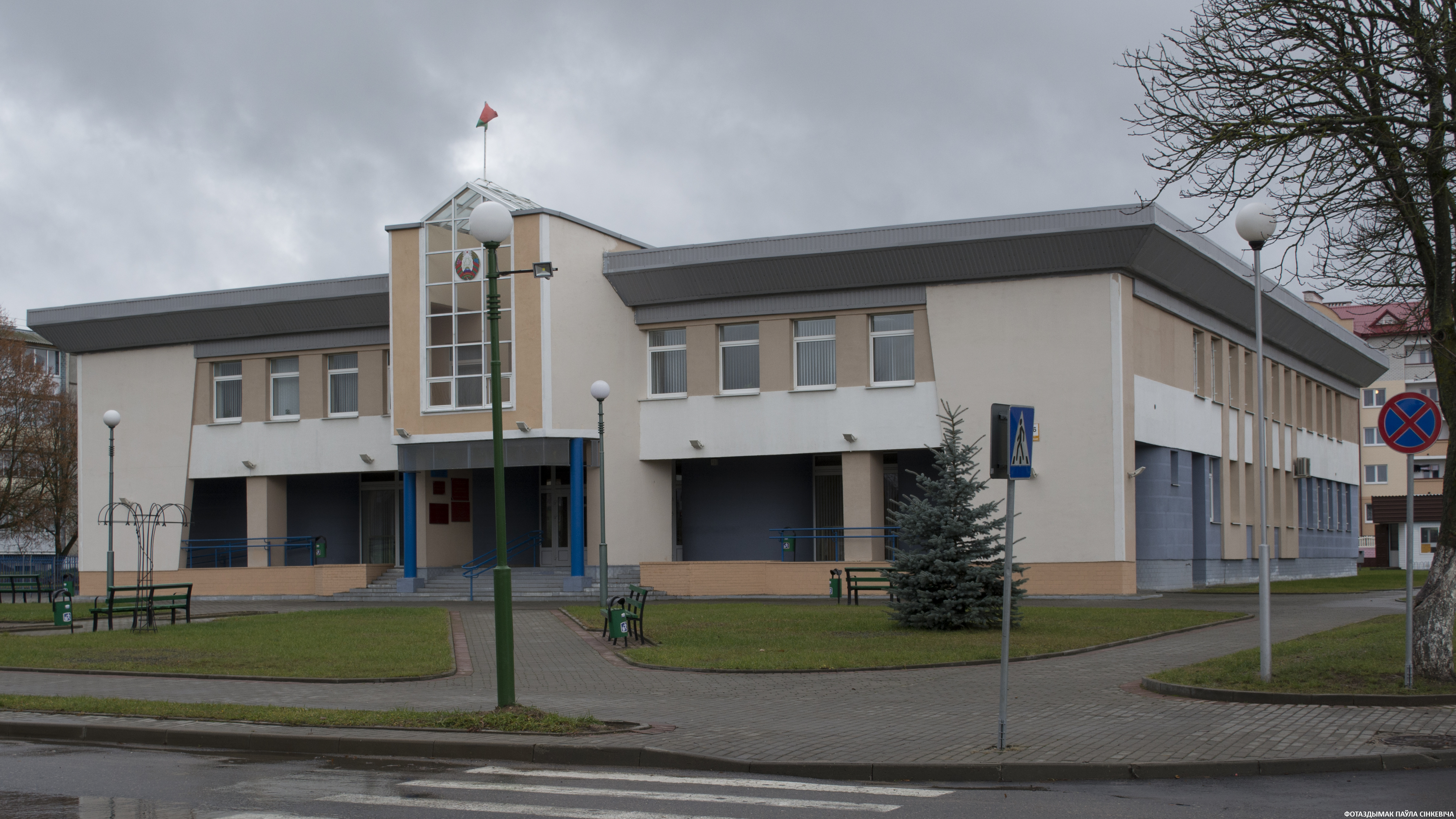
District court

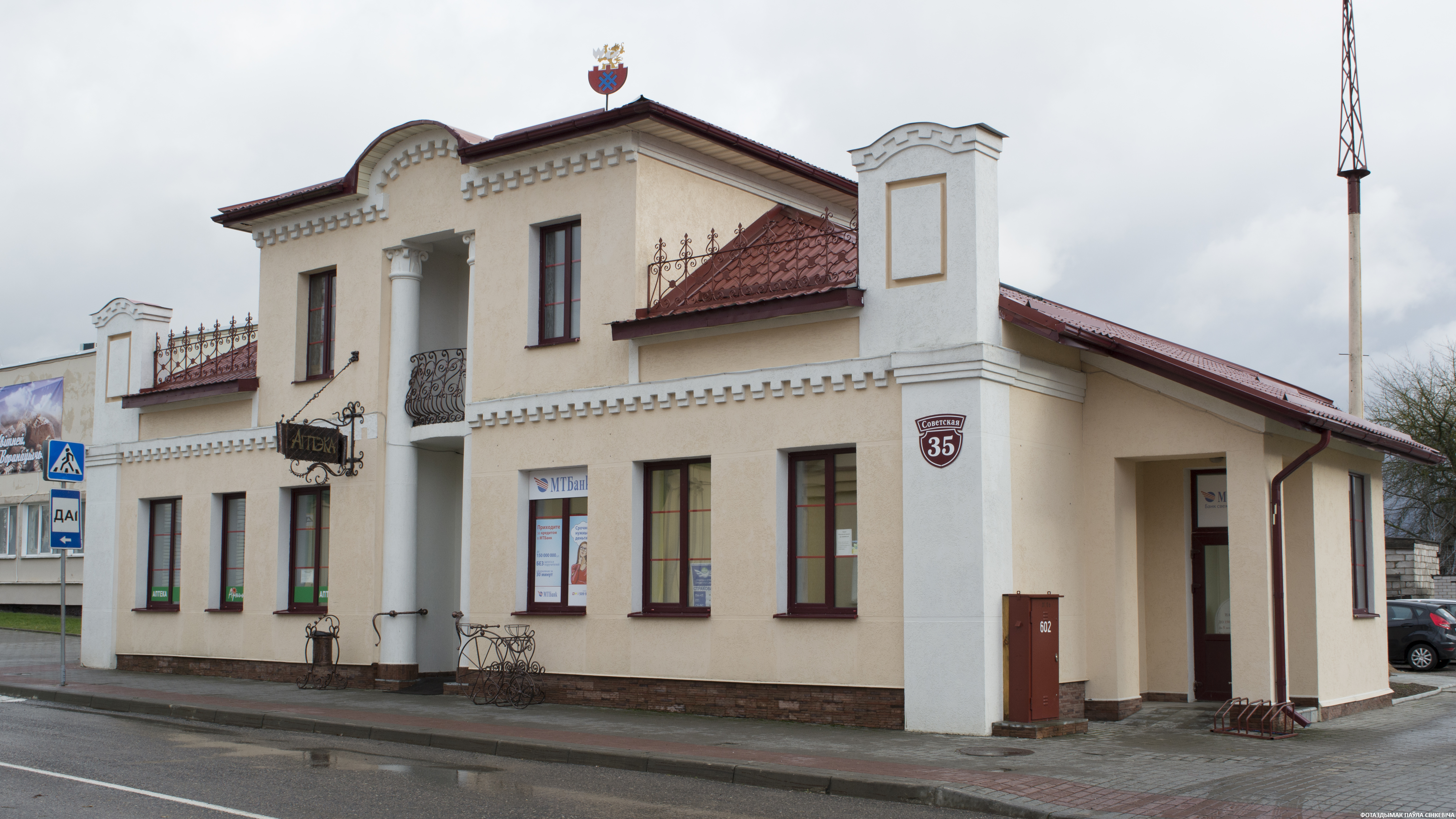
Pharmacy building

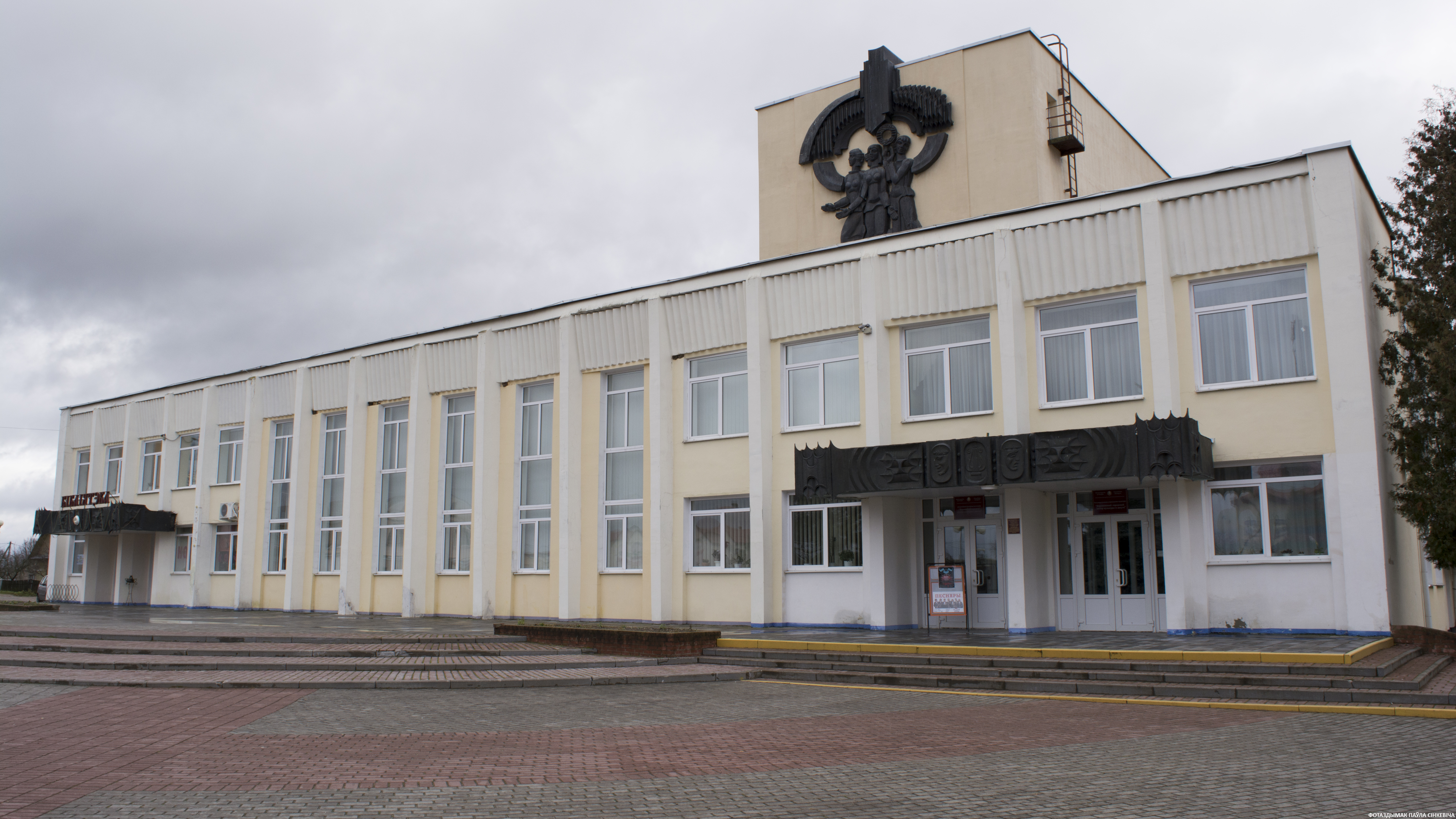
District house of culture

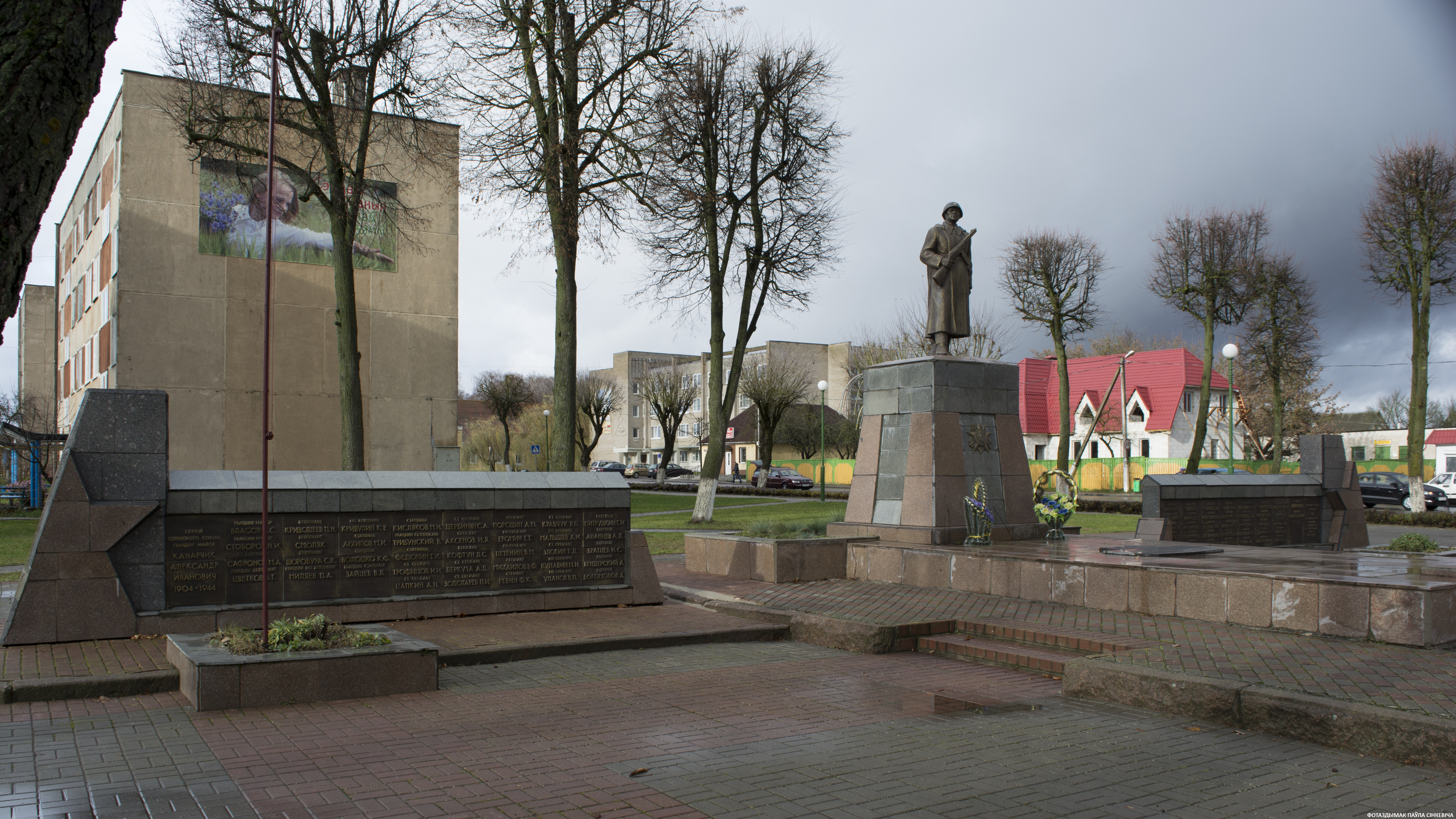
Monument to defenders of the motherland World War II

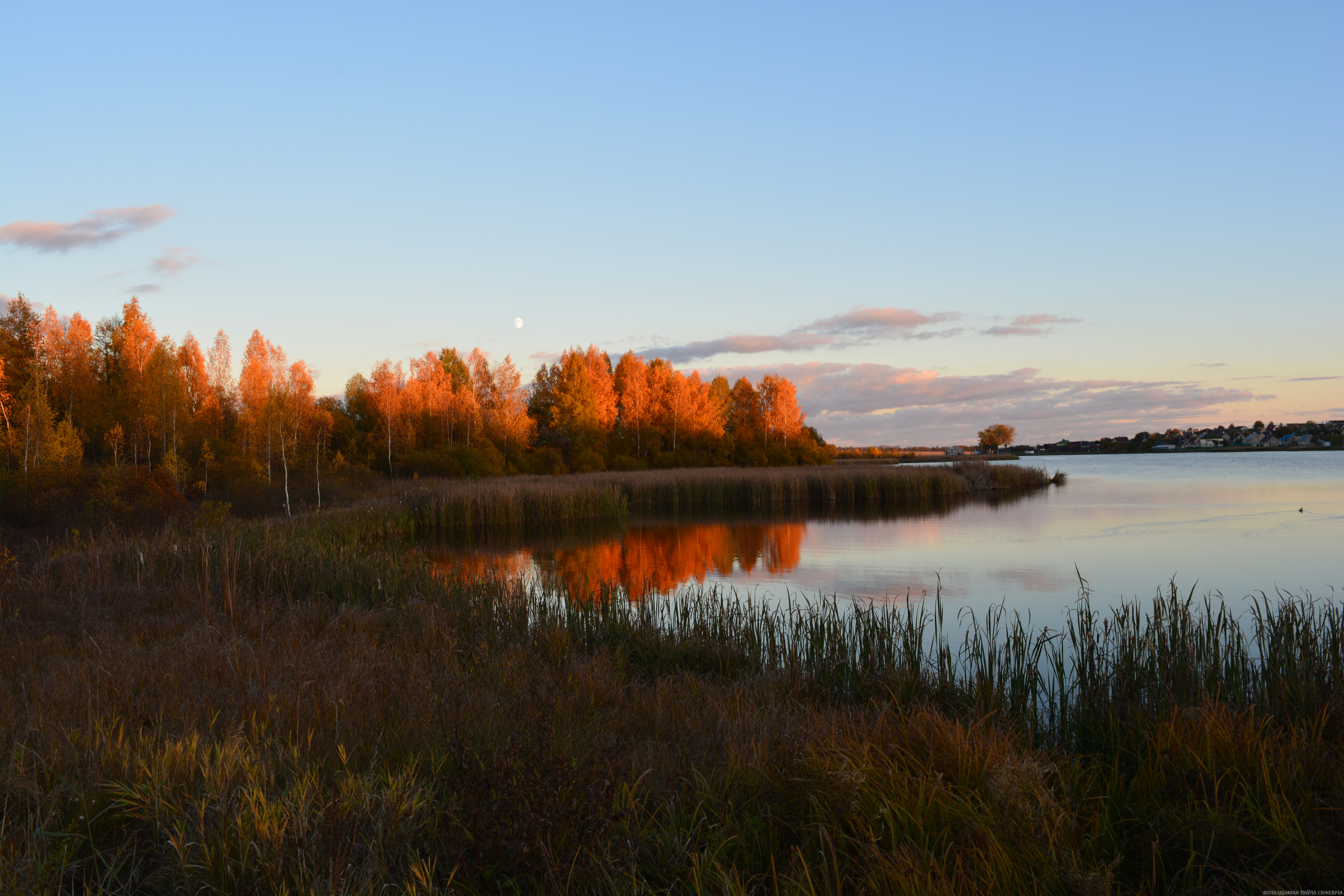
Voranava lake

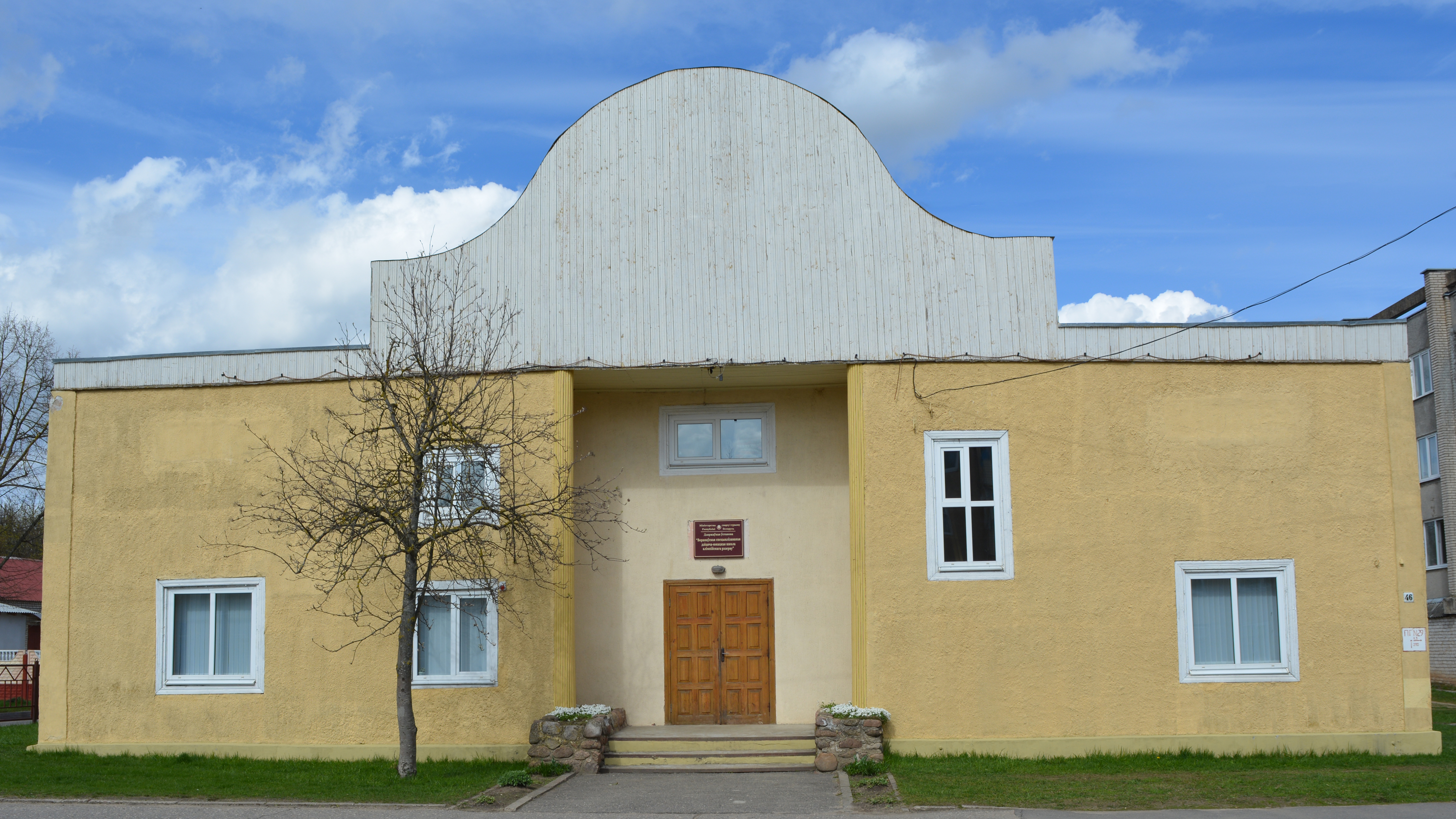
Former synagogue

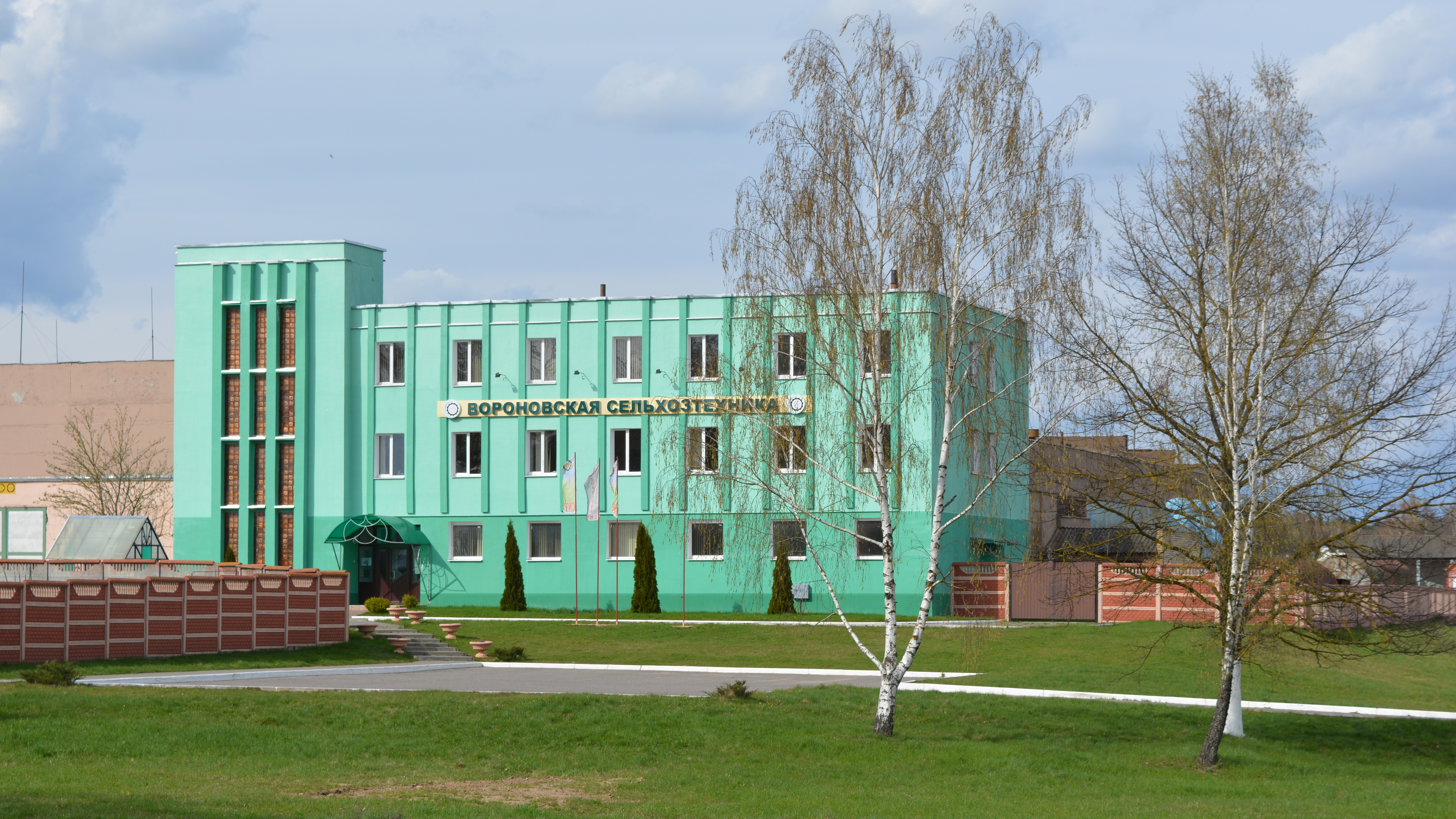
Voranava Farm machinery

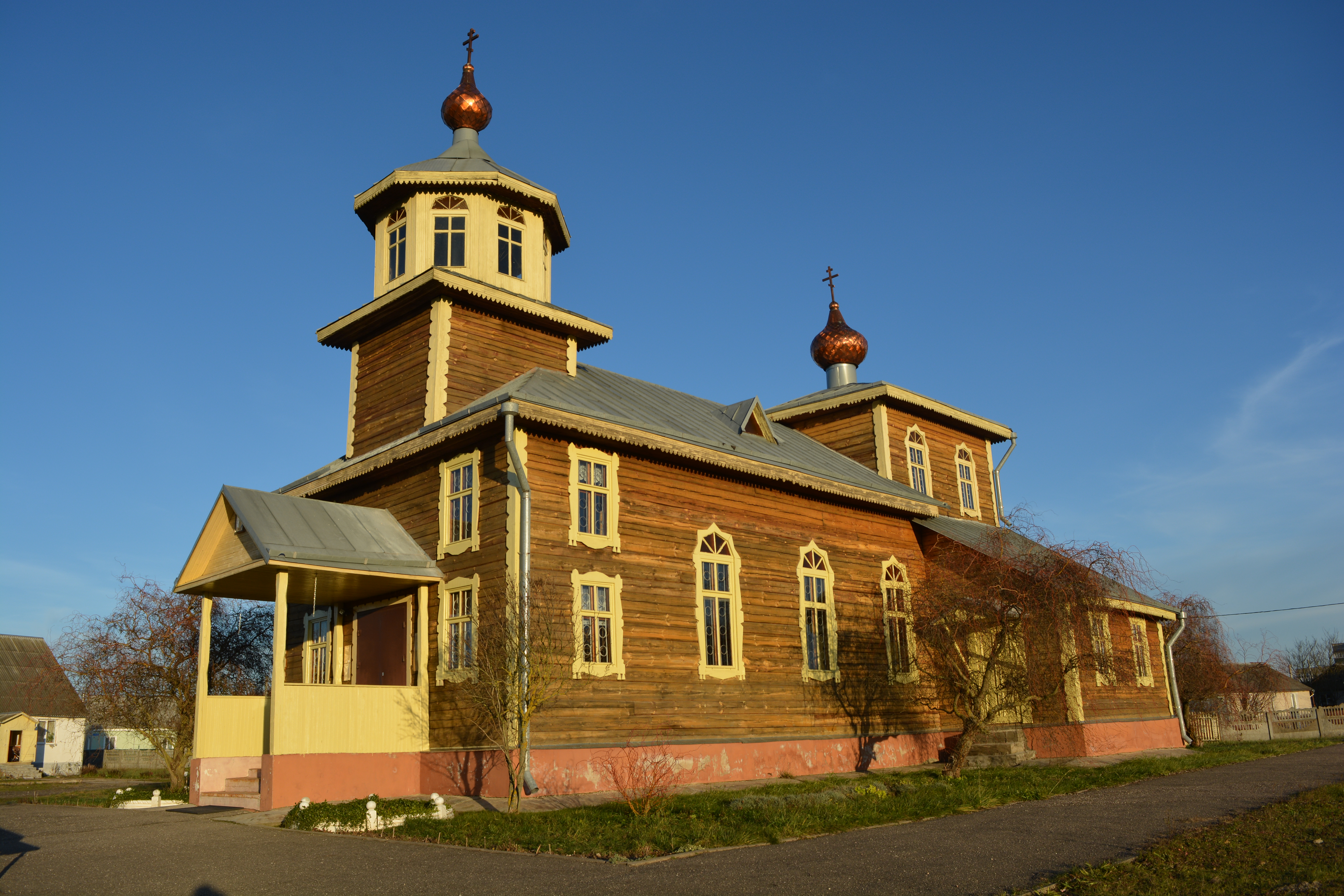
Church of Alexander Nevsky
