= List of highways numbered 11B =

The following highways are numbered 11B:

== Canada ==
- Ontario Highway 11B

== India ==
- National Highway 11B (India)

== United States ==
- New Hampshire Route 11B
- New York State Route 11B
  - County Route 11B (Otsego County, New York)
