= Pronia =

Pronya Russian: Проня
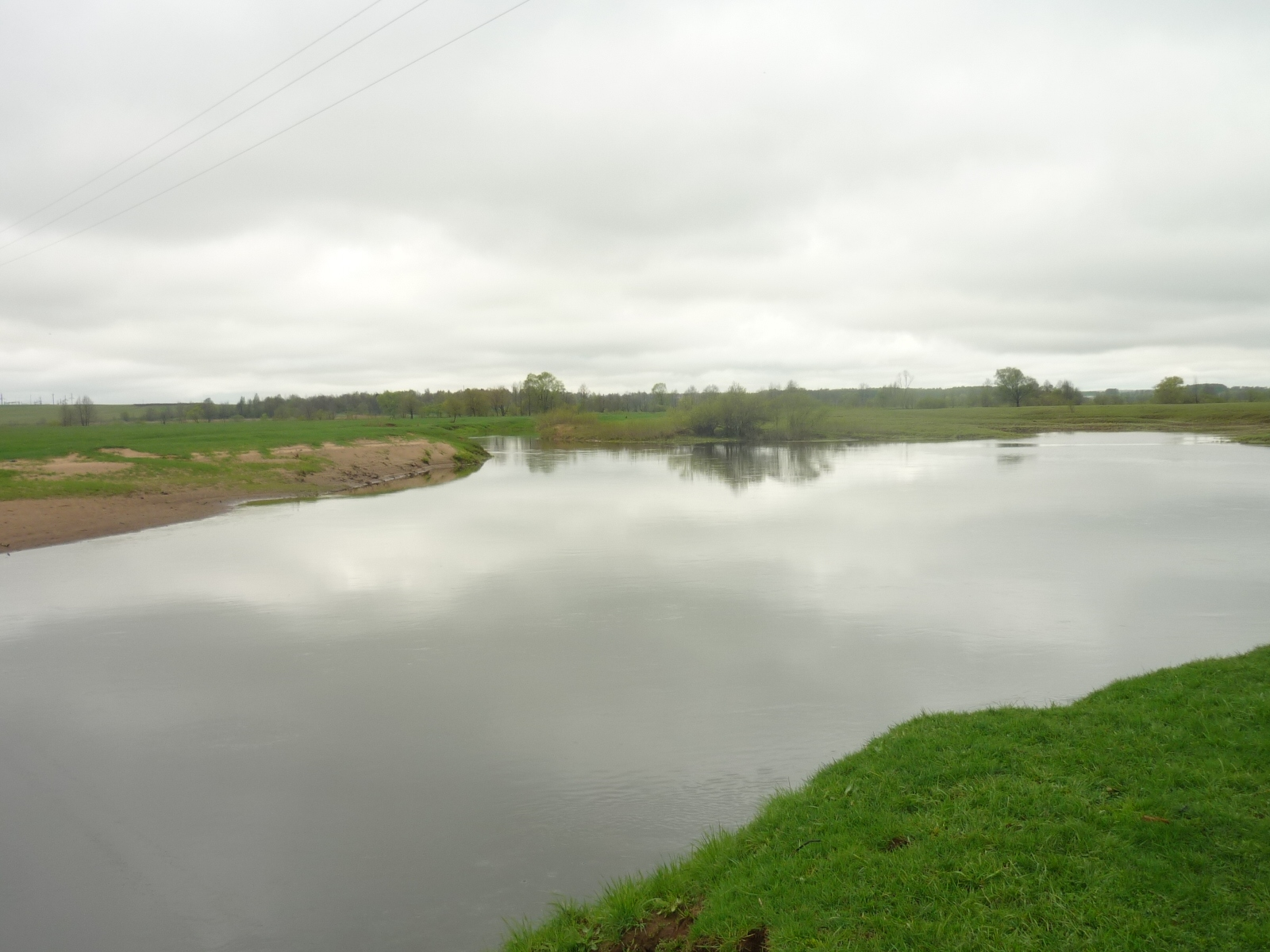
- The Pronya near Slavgorod

Location
- Country: Belarus
- Regions: Vitebsk, Mogilev
- Districts: Dubrowna, Horki, Drybin, Chavusy, Slawharad

Physical characteristics
- Source
  - location: Smolensk Upland
  - coordinates: 54°26′21″N 30°45′15″E
- Mouth: Sozh
  - location: Slavgorod
  - coordinates: 53°26′37″N 31°00′45″E
- Length: 172 km (107 mi)
- Basin size: 4,910 km^{2} (1,900 sq mi)
- Discharge
  - location: River mouth
  - average: 30 m^{3}/s (1,100 cu ft/s)

Basin features
- Progression: Sozh→ Dnieper→ Dnieper–Bug estuary→ Black Sea

The Pronia (Belarusian: Проня, Russian: Проня, also transliterated as Pronya) is a river in Mogilev and Vitebsk regions of Belarus. A right tributary of Sozh River, the Pronia begins near the village of Lanenka, Dubrowna District, Vitebsk Oblast. It flows from north to south, joining the Sozh in the eastern outskirts of the city of Slavgorod.

== Etymology ==
According to Max Vasmer, the name Pronya is associated with the Czech proný (fast, indomitable), in turn, possibly, arising from the Czech prudký (fast, compare with the Russian word prud).

According to Vladimir Toporov and Oleg Trubachyov, the name of the Pronia has Baltic origins. They propose that this hydronym evolved as follows: *Piren –(Baltic) – *Prena – *Pryona – Prornya. This correlates with the names of the Peranka, Perenka, Perinka, Piryanka rivers, which lie in the Sozh basin near the Pronya. Accordingly, the river is called the Pirėnai in Lithuanian or the Piranen, Piron in the Ancient Prussian.

Earlier, together with the modern name the river was also called the Propoy, also referring to its fast flow. The name of the city of Propoysk, renamed Slavgorod in 1945, arose from this term.

=== Legends ===
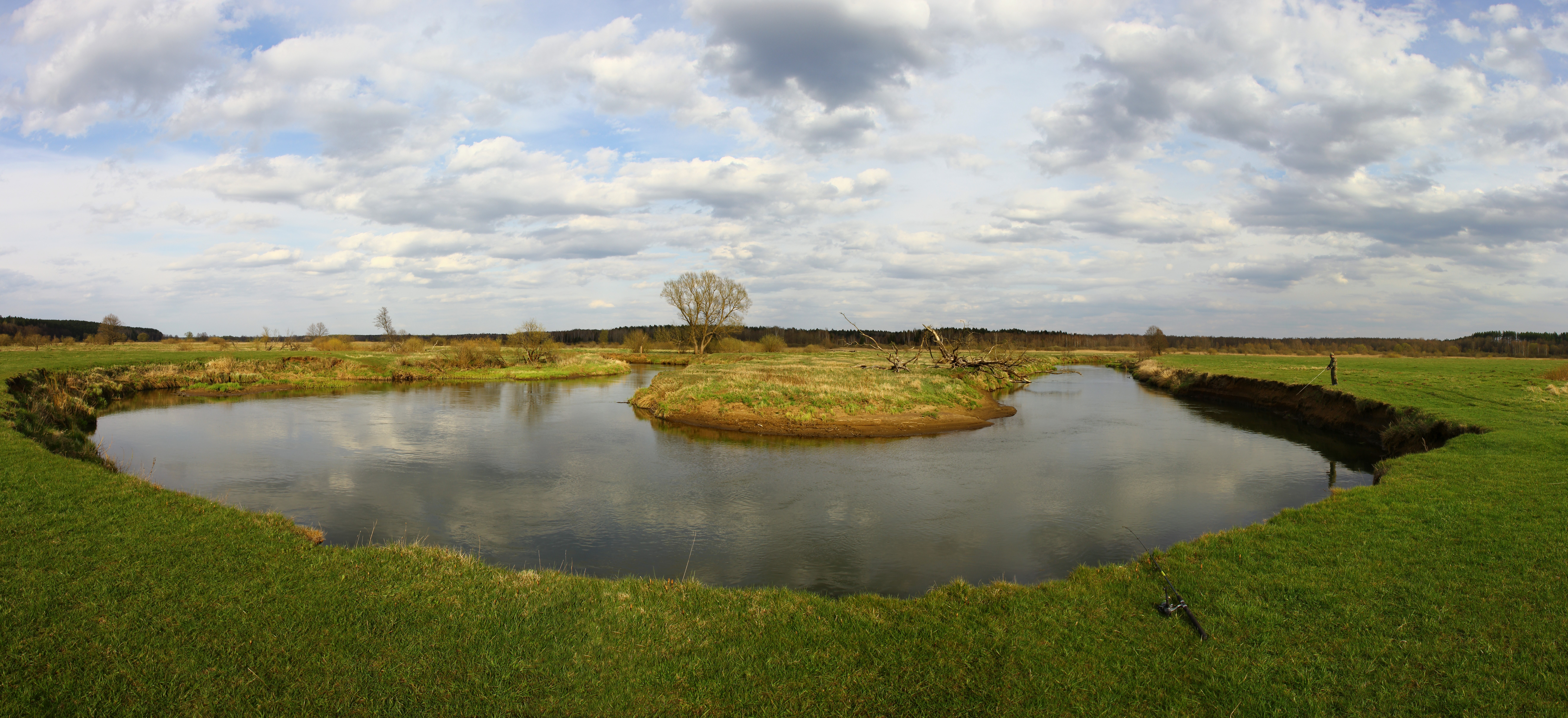
The Pronya not far from its confluence with the Basya

According to legend, the name arises from a girl named Basya and a youth named Pronya who lived nearby, who were in love with each other. Pronya was a poor peasant, and therefore Basya's parents were against their wedding. The lovers decided to flee, but were pursued. Not managing to elude their pursuers, the couple wished for the gods to grant them a future together. When the girl's father reached the glade, he saw the confluence of two rivers, which turned into the Basya and Pronya.

Another legend tells that the Pronya was named for a Romani girl who drowned in the river.

== Hydrography ==
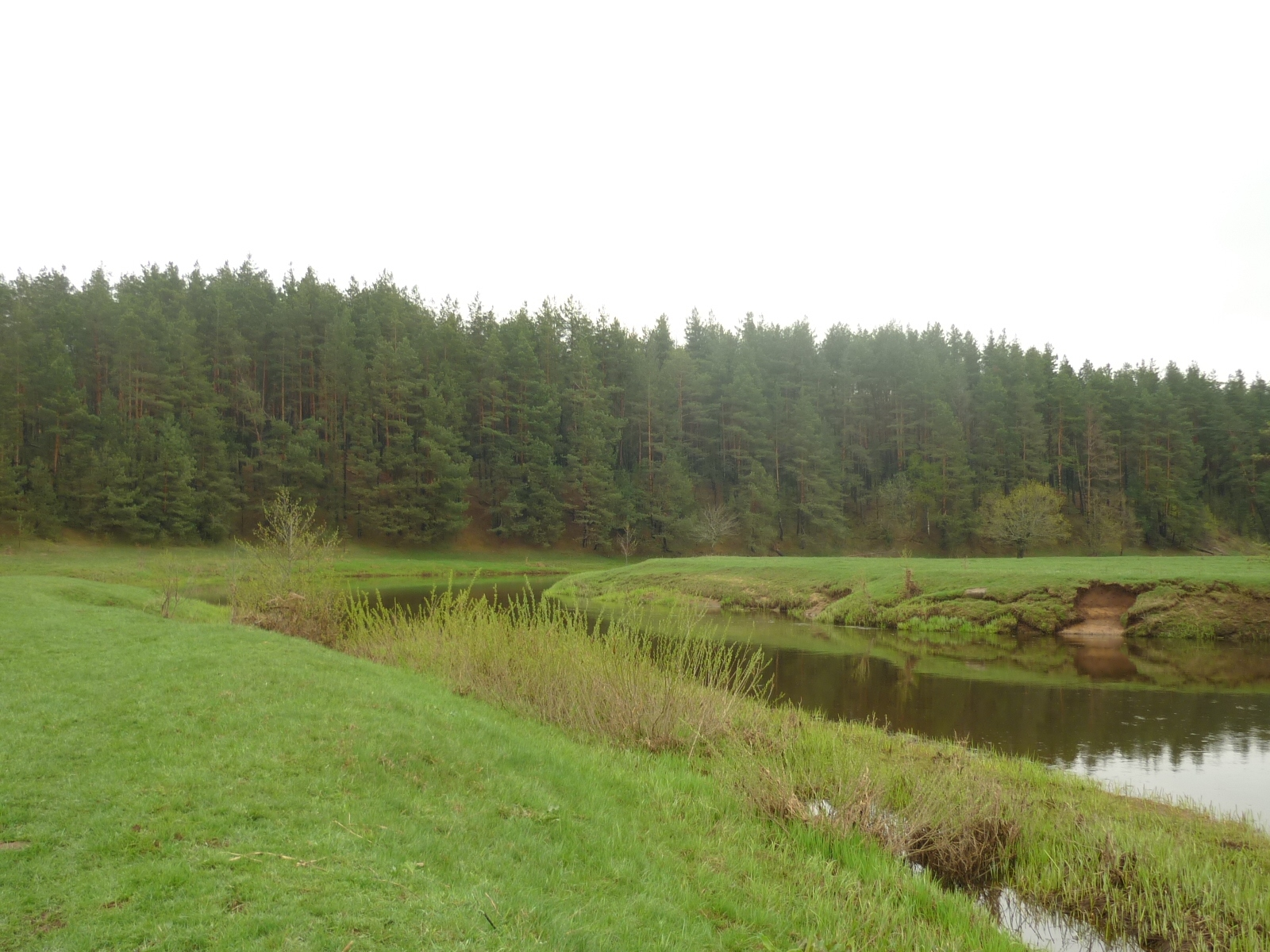
The Pronya in Slawharad District

The sources of the Pronya are located in the Smolensk Upland, near the village of Lanenka, Dubrovna District, Vitebsk Region. The river flows through the territory of the Orsha–Mogilev plain and joins the Sozh from the right near the city of Slawharad.

The river is 172 km long, with a basin of 4,910 km2. The discharge of the river at its mouth averages 30 m3/s. The average slope of the river surface is .5 percent, rising to 2–2.5 percent in some places.
