= Drybin =

Drybin Дрыбін (Belarusian) Дрибин (Russian)
- Urban-type settlement
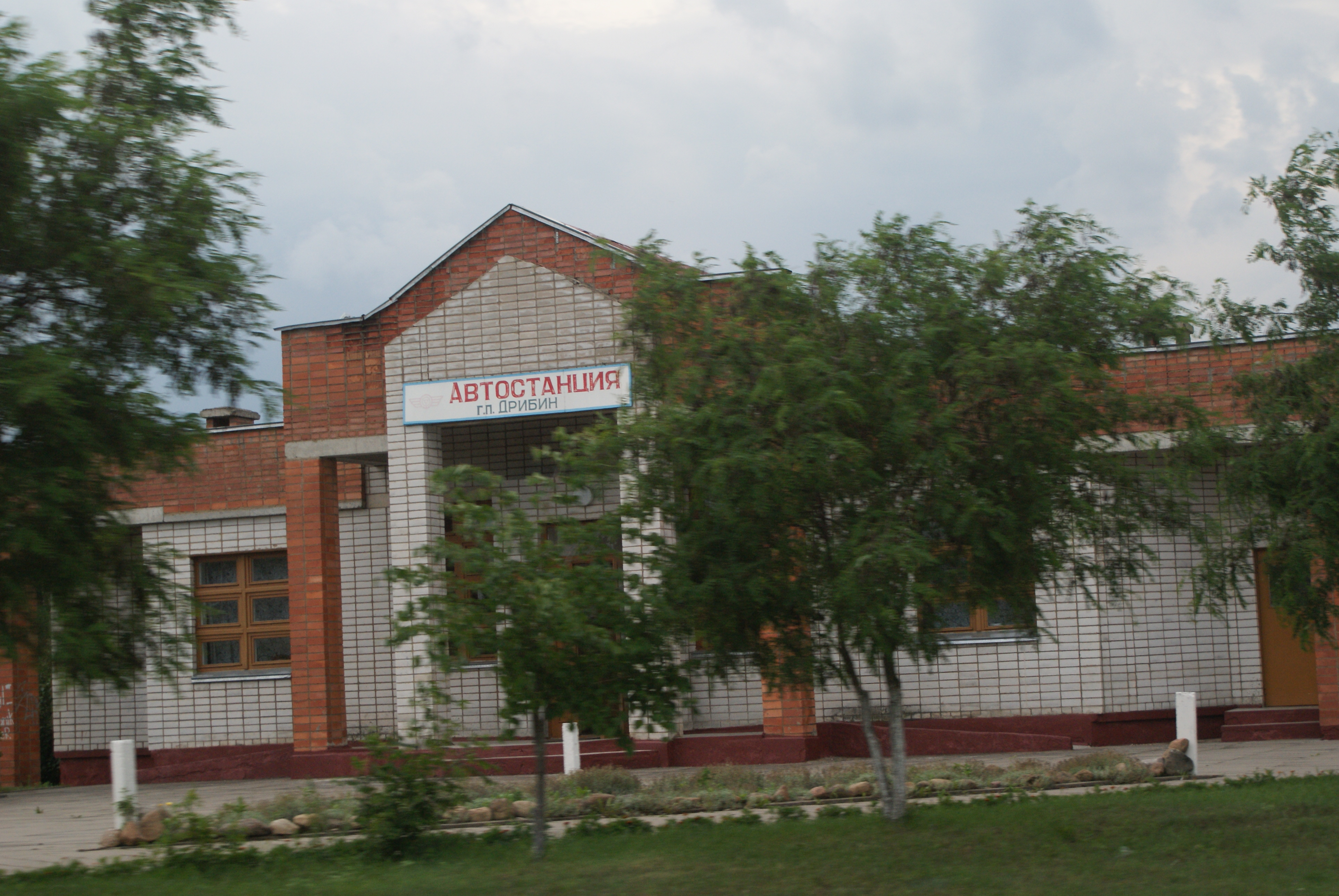

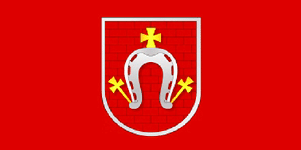
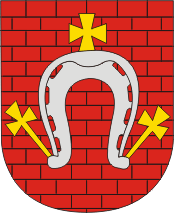
- Flag Coat of arms

- Location within Belarus
- Coordinates: 54°07′10″N 31°05′35″E
- Country: Belarus
- Region: Mogilev Region
- District: Drybin District
- Population (2024): 2,938
- Time zone: UTC+3 (MSK)

Drybin (Belarusian: Дрыбін; Russian: Дрибин, romanized: Dribin) is an urban-type settlement in Mogilev Region, Belarus. It serves as the administrative center of Drybin District. As of 2024, it has a population of 2,938.
