= Khotsimsk =

Khotsimsk Хоцімск (Belarusian)
- Urban-type settlement
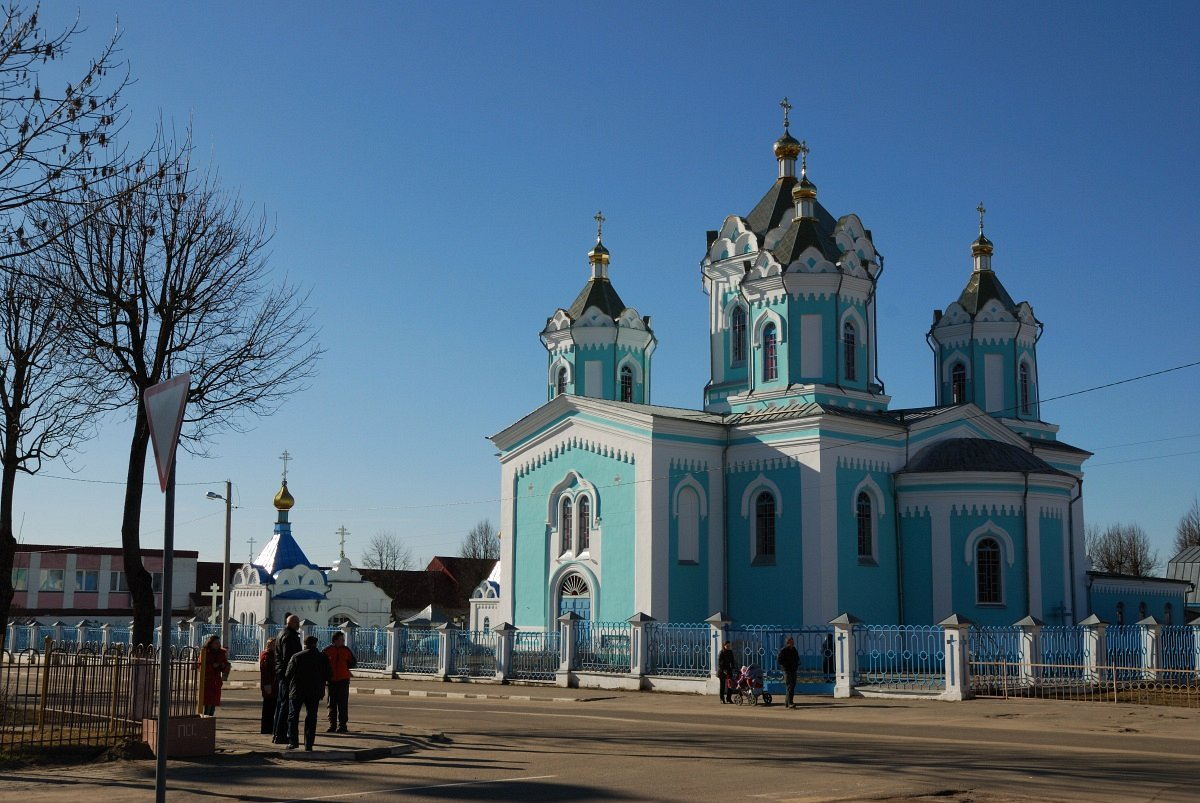

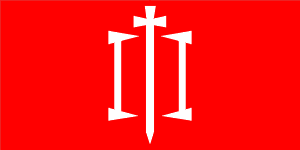
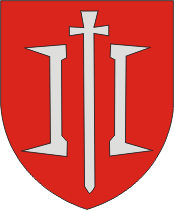
- Flag Coat of arms

- Location within Belarus
- Coordinates: 53°24′30″N 32°34′20″E
- Country: Belarus
- Region: Mogilev Region
- District: Khotsimsk District
- Population (2024): 6,087
- Time zone: UTC+3 (MSK)

Khotsimsk (Note: BGN/PCGN romanization.) (Belarusian: Хоцімск, romanized: Chocimsk; (Note: Official transliteration.) Russian: Хотимск, romanized: Khotimsk) is an urban-type settlement in Mogilev Region, Belarus. It serves as the administrative center of Khotsimsk District. The extreme eastern point of Belarus lies to the east of Khotsimsk. In 2017, its population was 6,300. As of 2024, it has a population of 6,087.
