= Drybin district =

District of Mogilev region, Belarus

Drybin district Дрыбінскі раён (Belarusian)
- District
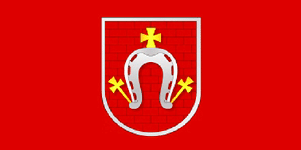
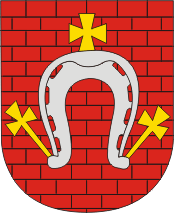
- Flag Coat of arms

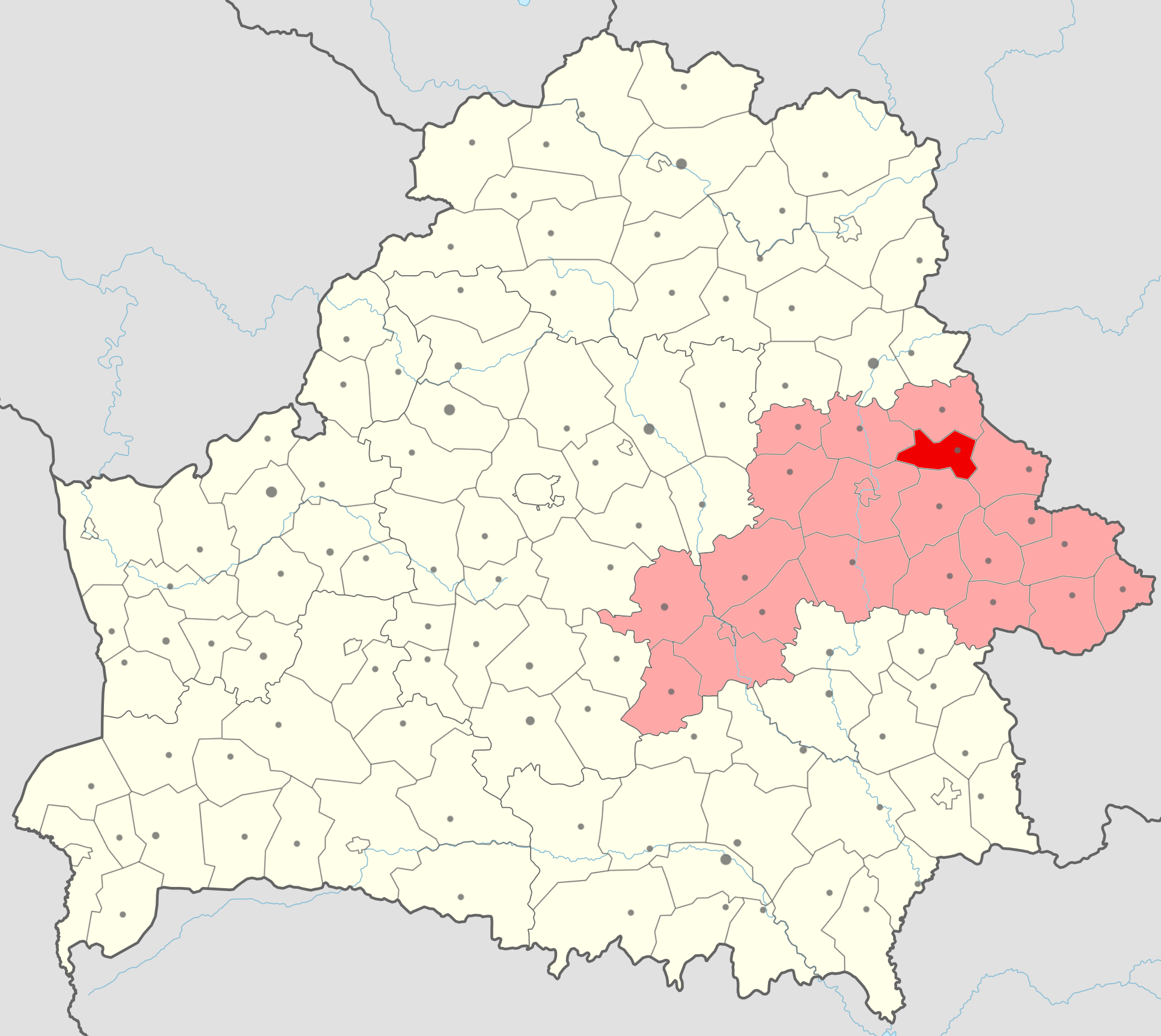
- Coordinates: 54°07′10″N 31°05′35″E
- Country: Belarus
- Region: Mogilev region
- Administrative center: Drybin

Area
  - Total: 766.53 km^{2} (295.96 sq mi)
- Elevation: 185 m (607 ft)

Population (2023)
  - Total: 9,670
  - Density: 12.6/km^{2} (32.7/sq mi)
- Time zone: UTC+3 (MSK)

Drybin district (Belarusian: Дрыбінскі раён; Russian: Дрибинский район, romanized: Dribinsky rayon) is a district (raion) of Mogilev region in Belarus. The administrative center is the urban-type settlement of Drybin. As of 2009, its population was 12,253. The population of Drybin accounts for 26.9% of the district's population. In 2024, its population was 9,457. As of 2025, it has a population of 9,190.

== Geography ==
Drybin District is situated in the northeastern part of Mogilev region. It borders the Cherykaw, Horki, Mstsislaw, and Klimavichy districts of Belarus, as well as Shatkovsky District in Nizhny Novgorod Oblast, Russia. The district covers an area of approximately 800 square kilometers. The landscape is predominantly flat, with several rivers, including the Pronya and Basya, flowing through the territory. Forests cover about 27% of the district's area.

== History ==
The district was initially established on July 17, 1924. It was dissolved in 1935 and again in 1959, before being re-established in its current form on December 29, 1989.

== Demographics ==
As of January 1, 2025, the district had a population of approximately 9,190 people. The administrative center, Drybin, accounts for a significant portion of the district's population. The district comprises several rural councils (selsoviets), encompassing numerous villages and hamlets.

== Economy ==
The local economy is primarily based on agriculture, including crop production and livestock farming. Additionally, the district has enterprises involved in food processing, woodworking, and the production of construction materials.

== Culture ==
Drybin district is known for its cultural heritage and traditional crafts, particularly carpet weaving and the legacy of the tsyrkuns—itinerant barbers and craftsmen. These traditions are preserved through local festivals and in the Drybin Historical and Ethnographic Museum.

== Points of interest ==
The district features several 19th-century Orthodox churches, World War II memorials, and natural landscapes that are of interest for ecological tourism. Notable natural sites include the Holomukskoye and Zhevanskoye hydrological reserves.
