= Hancharowka =

Village in Mogilev Region, Belarus

Hancharowka Ганчароўка (Belarusian)
- Village
- Location within Belarus
- Coordinates: 53°10′04″N 29°22′17″E
- Country: Belarus
- Region: Mogilev Region
- District: Babruysk District
- Time zone: UTC+3 (MSK)

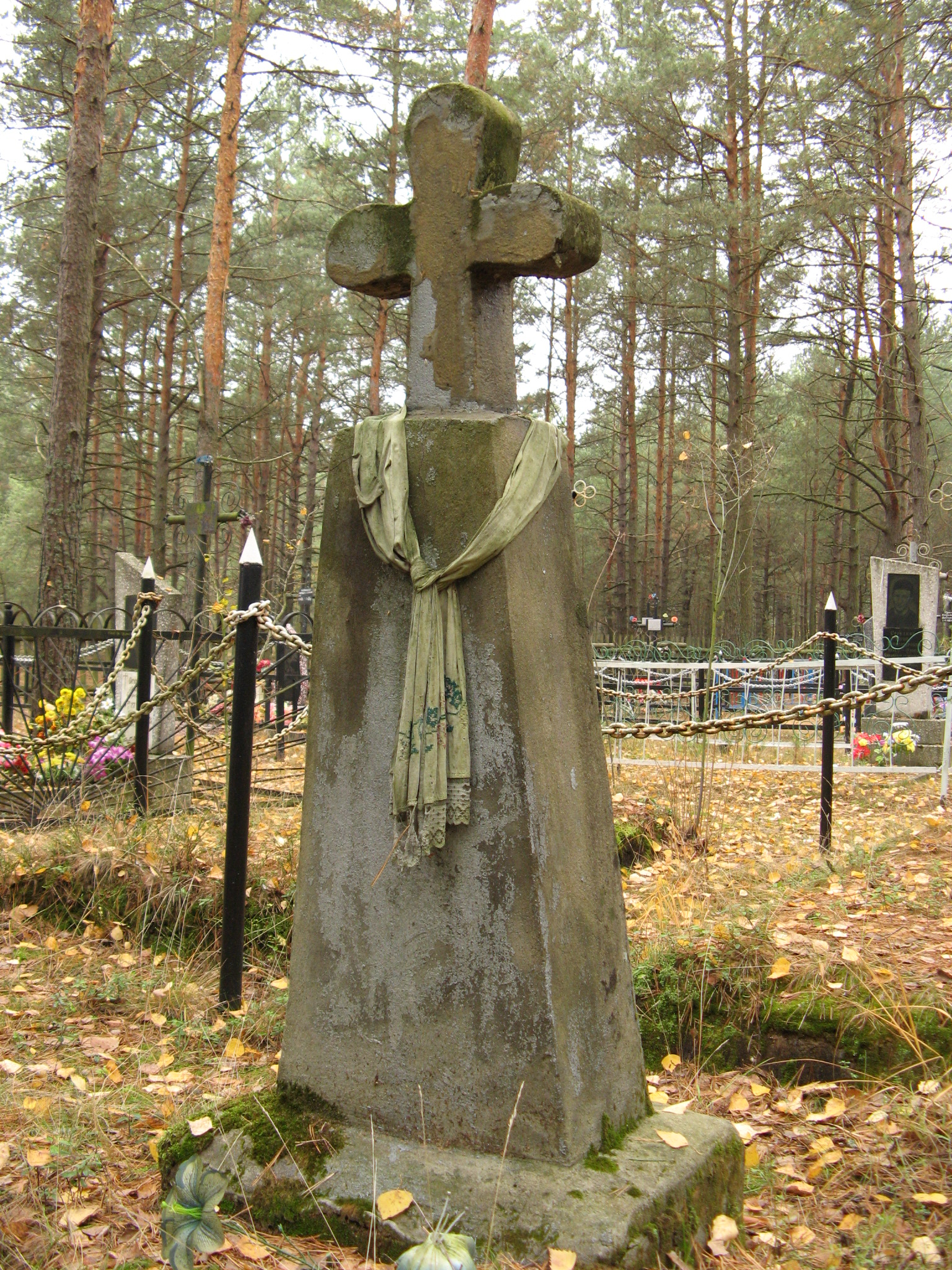
Cross at the local cemetery

Hancharowka (Belarusian: Ганчароўка, romanized: Hančaroŭka, IPA: [ɣɐntʃɐˈrowkɐ]; Russian: Гончаровка, romanized: Goncharovka) is a village in Babruysk District, Mogilev Region, Belarus. It is part of Khimy selsoviet.

== History ==
The name probably originates from the Belarusian word hanchar (ганчар-). It was founded in 1925 by the peasants of the local villages. In 1926, there were five houses and 23 people in the village. In 1934, the kolkhoz "Stalin's victory" was founded. In 1941–1944, the village was occupied by German troops. In 1967, the village Novaya Vyoska ("New Village") was incorporated in Hancharowka. In 1997, it had a population of 78; in 2008 – 61. At the village cemetery there is a monument established in 1975 in memory of Soviet soldiers.

== Sources ==
- Ганчароўка // Памяць. Бабруйскі раён : Гісторыка-дакументальныя хронікі гарадоў і раёнаў Беларусі / Гал. рэд. Г.П. Пашкоў. –Мн., 1998. – с.196
