= Syaliba =

Village in Mogilev Region, Belarus

Syaliba Сяліба (Belarusian)
- Village
- Location within Belarus Location within Europe
- Coordinates: 53°36′54″N 28°58′43″E
- Country: Belarus
- Region: Mogilev Region
- District: Babruysk District

Population (2009)
  - Total: 119
- Time zone: UTC+3 (MSK)
- Postal Code: 213812
- Area code: +375 225

Syaliba or Seliba (Belarusian: Сяліба, romanized: Sialiba; Russian: Селиба; Polish: Sieliba) is a village in Babruysk District, Mogilev Region, Belarus. It is part of Vishnyowka selsoviet.

== Geography ==
Seliba is located near the Berezina River, only being blocked from access by the now-unpopulated village of Luchnoy Most, which separates Seliba from the Berezino district.

== History ==
During the administration of Imperial Russia, Seliba was under jurisdiction of the Igumensky Uyezd in the Minsk Governorate.

In 1938, a sawmill in the village caught fire, and after barrels of oil caught fire, they exploded, burning down many dwellings and other buildings. An exodus of residents who lost their homes occurred following the blaze.

=== Jewish population ===
Seliba was a settlement home to many Jewish families during the late 19th and early 20th centuries. During the period of the Democratic Republic, soldiers from interwar Poland beat and killed several Jewish residents of the village, and looted and burned property there.

The settlement fell under Nazi control in July 1941. 10 Jewish men were killed in the initial invasion, and 6 women were killed after being raped. In December 1941, the Jewish population was killed along with the Jews of Bahushevichy and Pisiuta.

A Yizkor book, Der ḥurbm fun mayn shṭeṭl un ire ḳdoyshim, memorializes the village along with the town of Zalin. The village contains a Jewish cemetery, referred to simply as Kladbishche Yevreyskoye (Hebrew Cemetery).

== Demographics ==
In the 1897 All-Russia Census, the population was recorded at 982 people. Among that population, 893, or 90.9%, were Jewish.

By the 1999 census, the population was 117 people. By the 2009 census, the population was 2013 people.
