= Khotsimsk district =

District of Mogilev region, Belarus

Coordinates: 53°24′30″N 32°34′20″E

Khotsimsk district Хоцімскі раён (Belarusian) Хотимский район (Russian)
- District
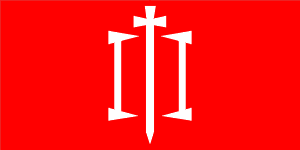
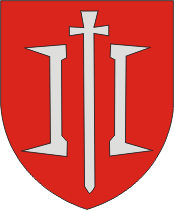
- Flag Coat of arms

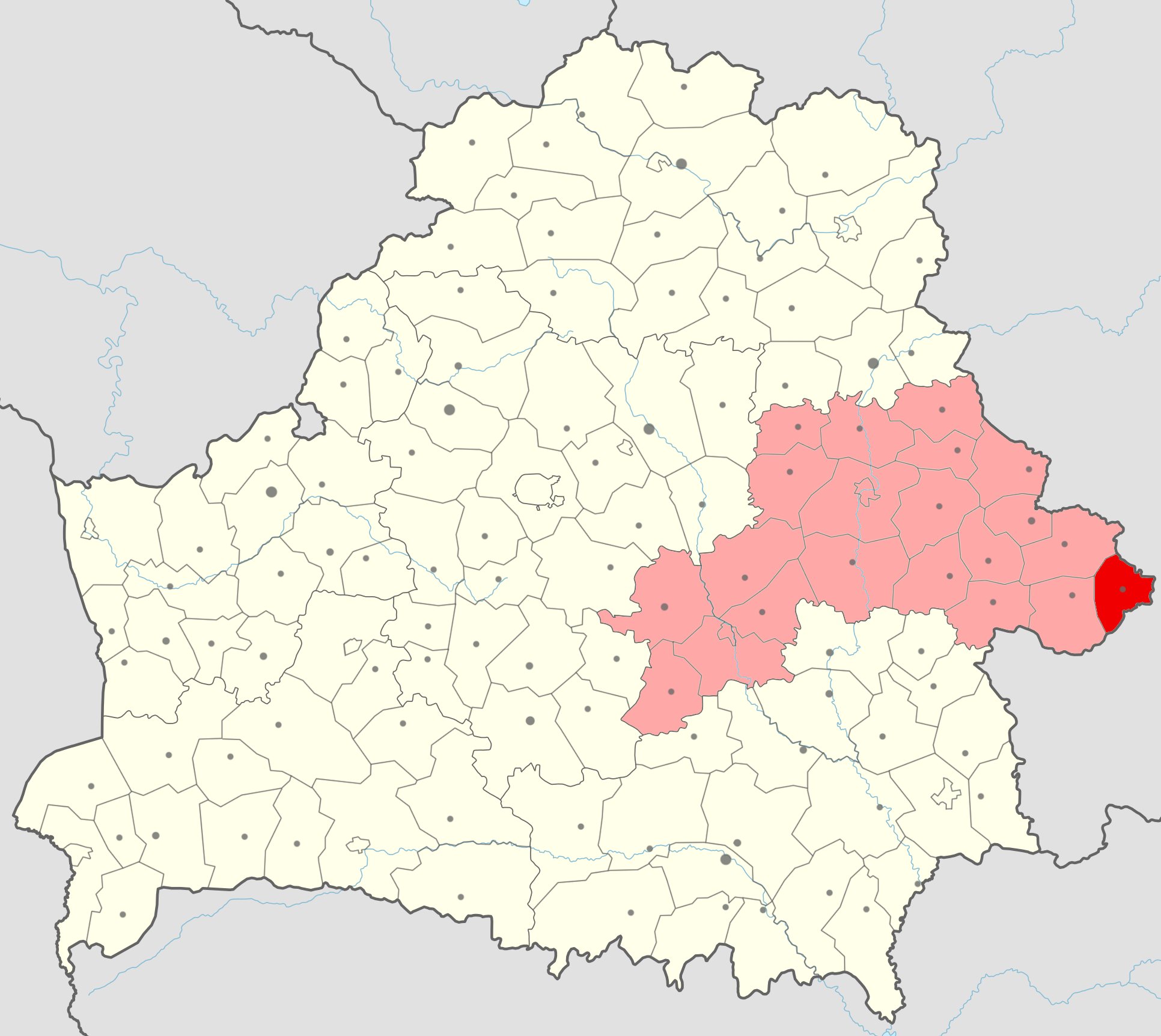
- Country: Belarus
- Region: Mogilev region
- Administrative center: Khotsimsk

Area
  - Total: 858.87 km^{2} (331.61 sq mi)

Population (2023)
  - Total: 9,877
  - Density: 11.50/km^{2} (29.78/sq mi)
- Time zone: UTC+3 (MSK)

Khotsimsk district or Chocimsk district (Belarusian: Хоцімскі раён; Russian: Хотимский район, romanized: Khotimsky rayon) is a district (raion) of Mogilev region in Belarus. The administrative center is the urban-type settlement of Khotsimsk. As of 2009, its population was 13,057. The population of Khotsimsk accounts for 54.3% of the district's population.

Khotimsk district is the easternmost district of the country. The extreme eastern point of Belarus lies to the east of Khotsimsk.
