= Cherikov =

Cherikov Чэрыкаў (Belarusian) Чериков (Russian) Cherykaw
- Town
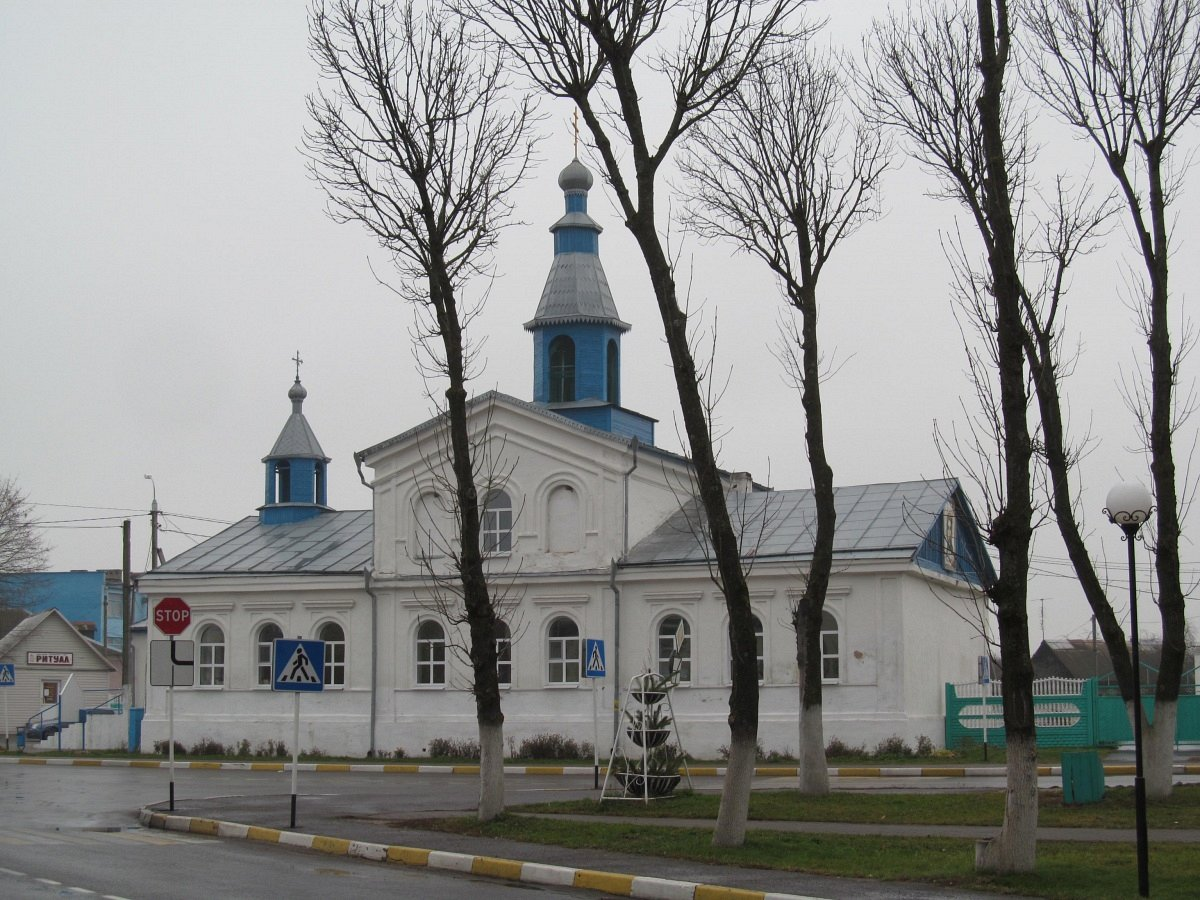

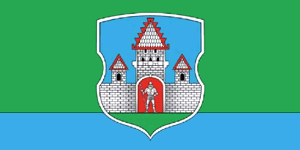
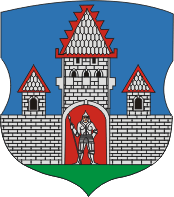
- Flag Coat of arms

- Location within Belarus
- Coordinates: 53°34′N 31°22′E
- Country: Belarus
- Region: Mogilev Region
- District: Cherykaw District

Population (2025)
  - Total: 7,710
- Time zone: UTC+3 (MSK)
- License plate: 6

Cherikov or Cherykaw (Belarusian: Чэ́рыкаў, romanized: Čerykaŭ; Russian: Че́риков, romanized: Cherikov; Polish: Czeryków; Yiddish: טשעריקאָוו) is a town in Mogilev Region, Belarus. It is located in the east of the region, on the Sozh River, and serves as the administrative center of Cherykaw District. In 2009, its population was 8,177. As of 2025, it has a population of 7,710.

== History ==
Cherikov was first mentioned in 1460. At the time, it was a part of Grand Duchy of Lithuania, in a personal union with the Kingdom of Poland, and Casimir IV Jagiellon, the king of Poland, ordered to have an Orthodox church to be built in Cherikov. From 1566 to 1772, Cherikov belonged to the Mstsislaw Voivodeship of the Grand Duchy of Lithuania. In 1604, Cherikov was granted town status, and in 1641, it was granted a coat of arms. In 1772, as a result of the First Partition of Poland, it was transferred to the Russian Empire. In the 19th century it belonged to Mogilev Governorate.

In 1919, Mogilev Governorate was abolished, and Cherikov was transferred to Gomel Governorate. On July 17, 1924, the governorate was abolished, and Cherikov became the administrative center of Cherikov Raion, which belonged to Kalinin Okrug of the Byelorussian SSR. In July 1927, Kalinin Okrug was abolished, and Cherikov was transferred into Mogilev Okrug. On January 15, 1938, the raion was transferred to Mogilev Region. During World War II, the town was under German occupation from 17 July 1941 until 1 October 1943 and it was severely damaged.

In 1986, it was considerably affected by the 1986 Chernobyl disaster with restricted areas due to high levels of radioactive contamination.

== Economy ==
=== Industry ===
There are timber industry and textile industry enterprises in Cherikov .

=== Transportation ===
The town is located on the highway connecting Roslavl in Russia with Bobruysk. There are also road connections with Mogilev via Chavusy and with Kastsyukovichy.

== Culture and recreation ==
In Cherikov, several buildings survived from the 19th and the beginning of the 20th century. In particular, the Catholic church was built in 1869, and in the Soviet times was used as a Palace of Culture. One of the mansions from the 19th century is currently used as a church.

== Notable people ==
- Viktor Karamazov (1934–2023). Belarusian writer, screenwriter, and journalist. Author of novels, short stories, journalistic prose, essays, scripts for the television film "Green Frigates," and several documentaries.
- Sergey Kachayev (1953–2011). Belarusian architect. He designed numerous projects, including a 109-bed hotel and a 300-bed hospital in Kostyukovichi; a district hospital in Dribin; a community center in Cherikov; The House of WWII Veterans, an extension to the regional television building in Mogilev.
- Isaak Lyuban (1906–1975). Belarusian Soviet composer and public figure. From 1949 to 1955, he was the artistic director of the Central House of Culture of Railway Workers. He compiled the Belarusian-language collection "Belarusian Folk and Revolutionary Songs for Choral and Solo Performance."
- Leonid Yevmenov (1932–2019). Belarusian philosopher and writer. He began publishing fiction in print in 1949 and also published poetry collections. He translated contemporary French and Francophone poetry. He is the author of scholarly works on philosophy, ethics, and aesthetics.
