= Klichaw district =

District of Mogilev region, Belarus

Coordinates: 53°28′58″N 29°20′28″E

Klichaw district Клічаўскі раён (Belarusian) Кличевский район (Russian)
- District
- Flag Coat of arms

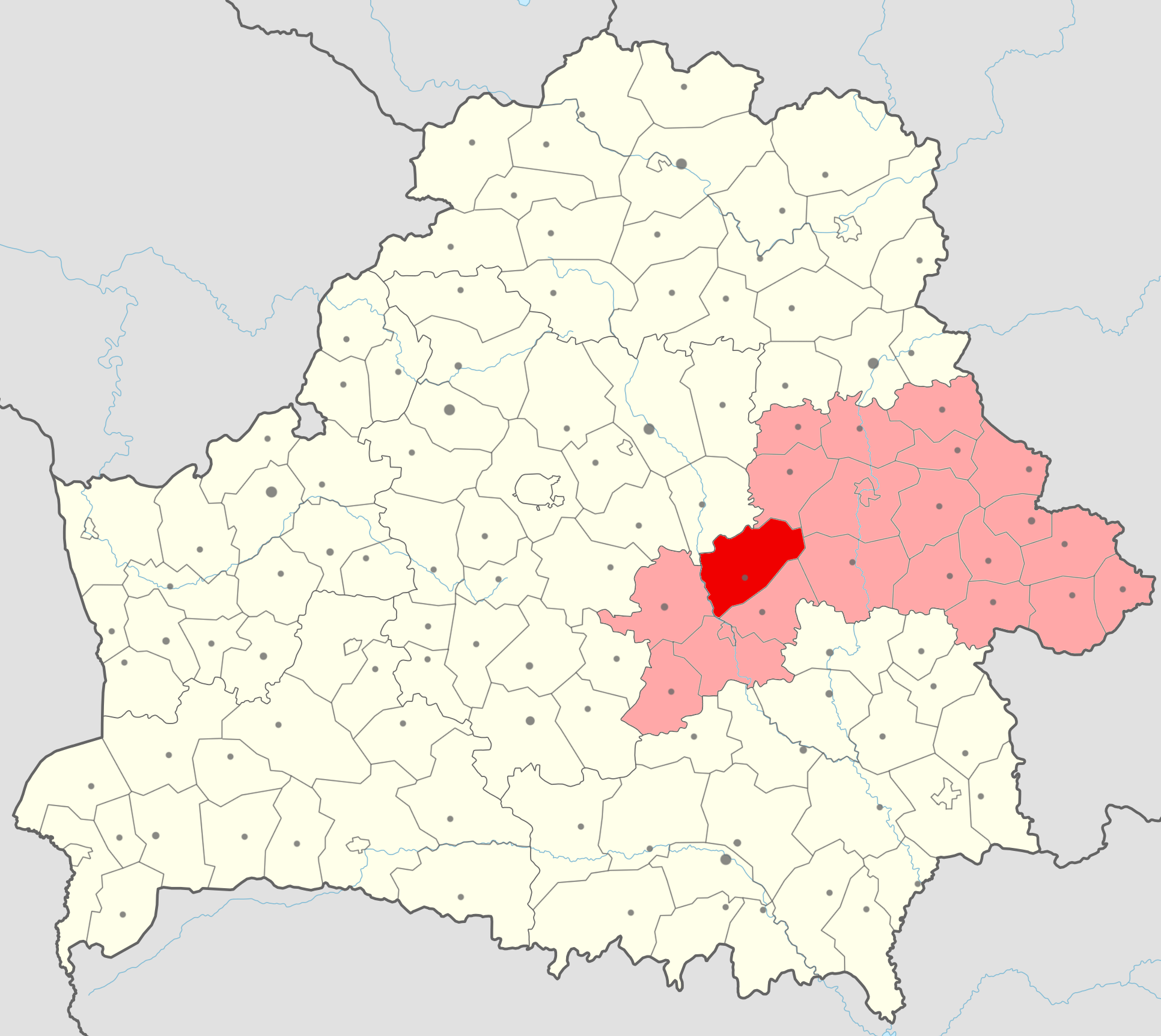
- Country: Belarus
- Region: Mogilev region
- Administrative center: Klichaw

Area
  - Total: 180,032 km^{2} (69,511 sq mi)

Population (2023)
  - Total: 13,890
  - Density: 0.07715/km^{2} (0.1998/sq mi)
- Time zone: UTC+3 (MSK)

Klichaw district or Kličaŭ district (Belarusian: Клічаўскі раён; Russian: Кличевский район, romanized: Klichevsky rayon) is a district (raion) of Mogilev region in Belarus. The administrative center is Klichaw. As of 2009, its population was 17,246. The population of Klichaw accounts for 43.6% of the district's population.

== Notable residents ==
- Ignacy Hryniewiecki (1855, Basin hamlet (now Kalinaǔka village) - 1881), member of the revolutionary society Narodnaya Volya who assassinated Tsar Alexander II of Russia
- Arkadź Smolič (1891, Bacevičy village - 1938), Belarusian academic, active participant of the Belarusian independence movement and a victim of Stalin's purges
