= Cherikov district =

District of Mogilev region, Belarus

Čerykaŭ district/ Cherikov district Чэрыкаўскі раён (Belarusian)
- District
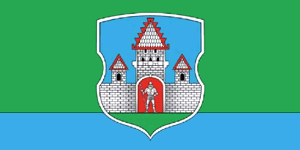
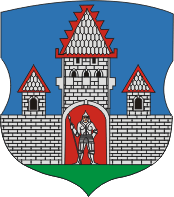
- Flag Coat of arms

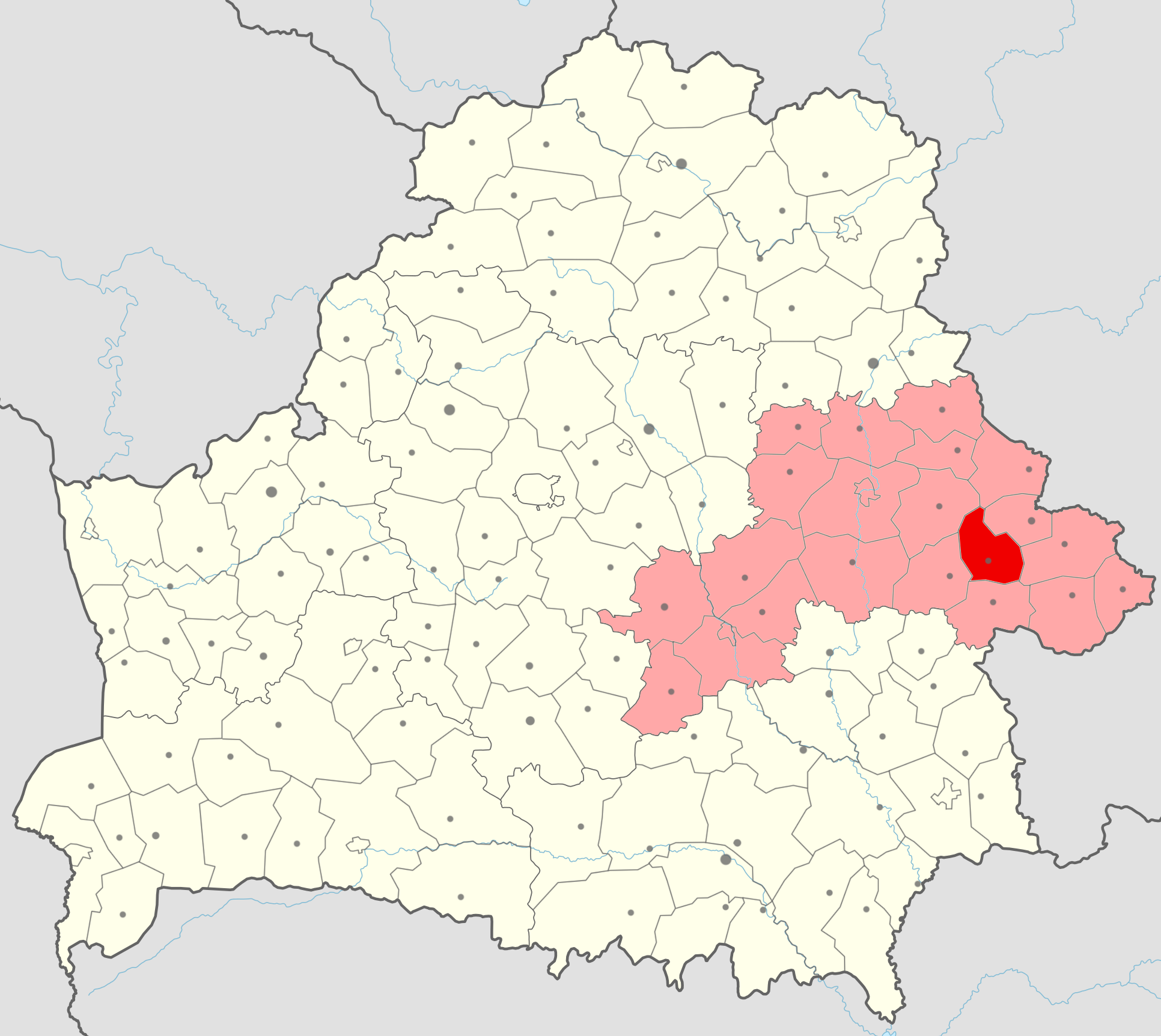
- Coordinates: 53°34′N 31°22′E
- Country: Belarus
- Region: Mogilev region
- Administrative center: Cherikov

Area
  - Total: 1,020.20 km^{2} (393.90 sq mi)
- Elevation: 189 m (620 ft)

Population (2023)
  - Total: 12,566
  - Density: 12.317/km^{2} (31.901/sq mi)
- Time zone: UTC+3 (MSK)

Cherikov district or Čerykaŭ district (Belarusian: Чэрыкаўскі раён; Russian: Чериковский район, romanized: Cherikovsky rayon) is a district (raion) of Mogilev region in Belarus. The administrative center is the town of Cherikov. As of 2009, its population was 14,875. The population of Cherikov accounts for 55.0% of the district's population.

== History ==
As a result of the Chernobyl disaster, part of the district's territory became contaminated, and the inhabitants were resettled. In the area, several settlements remained uninhabited.
