= Babruysk district =

District of Mogilev region, Belarus

Babruysk district Бабруйскі раён (Belarusian)
- District
- Flag Coat of arms

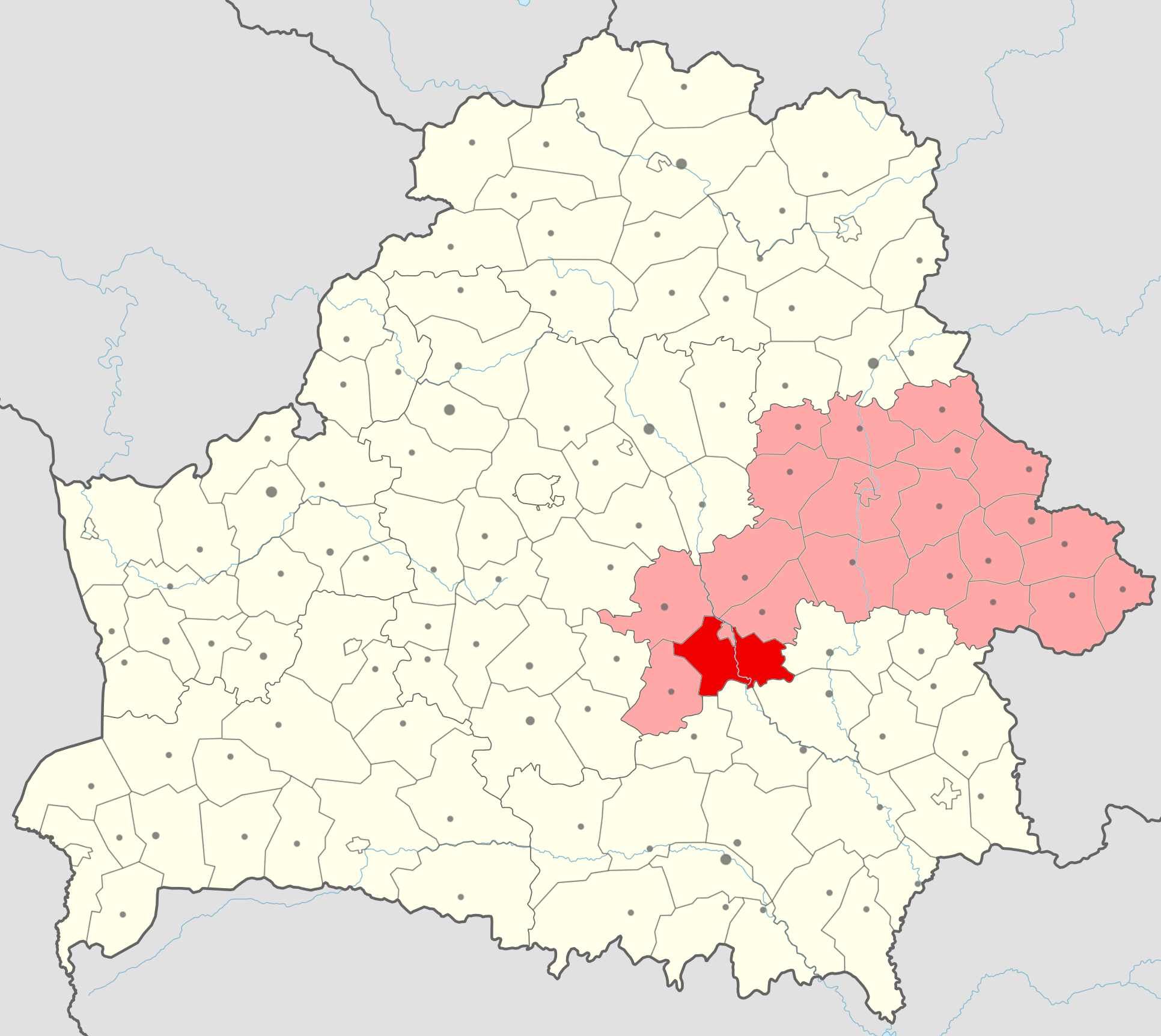
- Coordinates: 53°06′N 29°13′E
- Country: Belarus
- Region: Mogilev region
- Administrative center: Babruysk

Area
  - District: 1,599.05 km^{2} (617.40 sq mi)
- Elevation: 146 m (479 ft)

Population (2024)
  - District: 16,500
  - Density: 10.3/km^{2} (26.7/sq mi)
  - Rural: 16,500
- Time zone: UTC+3 (MSK)

Babruysk district or Babrujsk district (Belarusian: Бабруйскі раён; Russian: Бобруйский район, romanized: Bobruysky rayon) is a district (raion) of Mogilev region in Belarus. The administrative center is the city of Babruysk, though it is administratively separated from the district. In 2009, its population was 20,660. As of 2024, it has a population of 16,500.

== Notable residents ==
- Vintsent Dunin-Martsinkyevich (c. 1808–1884), was one of the founders of the modern Belarusian literary tradition and national school theatre.

== See also ==
- Hancharowka
- Syaliba
