= List of regions of Belarus by Human Development Index =

This is a list of Regions of Belarus by Human Development Index as of 2023.

Very high human development
Rank	Region	HDI (2023)
1	Minsk Region (with Minsk city)	0.835
2	Gomel Region	0.824
–	Belarus (average)	0.824
3	Grodno Region	0.821
4-5	Brest Region	0.816
4-5	Vitebsk Region	0.816
6	Mogilev Region	0.814
