= Masiej Siadnioŭ =

Belarusian poet (1915–2001)

- Масей Сяднёў
- Born: September 1, 1915; Mokraje, Russian Empire
- Died: February 5, 2001 (aged 85); United States
- Occupations: Poet; novelist
- Writing career
- Language: Belarusian
- Notable works: І той дзень надыйшоў: Раман [And that day came: Novel], 1987

Majsiej Laryvonavič Siadnioŭ (Note: Belarusian: Майсей Ларывонавіч Сяднёў, romanized: Maysyey Laryvonavich Syadnyow) (1 September 1915 – 5 February 2001), also known as Masiej Siadnioŭ, (Note: Belarusian: Масей, romanized: Masyey) was a Belarusian poet and novelist.

== Early years ==
Siadnioŭ was born on 1 September 1915 (according to other sources 1913) into a poor farming family in the village of Mokraje, Mahilioŭ governorate of the Russian Empire (now Kaściukovičy district in Mahilioŭ region of Belarus).

One of his teachers at secondary school (who was an acquaintance of the famous Belarusian poet Jakub Kolas) encouraged Siadnioŭ's interest in literature.

After school, Siadnioŭ went on to study at the Mścislaŭ Pedagogical College (1930–31) and in 1933 entered the Minsk Higher Pedagogical Institute.

== Gulag and escape ==
In the last year of his studies in October 1936, he was arrested on charges of participation in the "National Democratic" movement. According to the verdict, he was allegedly a member of an "anti-Soviet, counter-revolutionary organisation" while at the Mścislaŭ Institute. He was sent to a Gulag prison camp in the Kolyma region of the Russian Far East.

After 5 years in the Gulag, Siadnioŭ was brought to Minsk for retrial. However, the invasion of Belarus by the Nazis allowed him to escape and he returned to farming in his native village.

== Life in exile ==
Fearing re-arrest, he fled the advancing Soviet troops in 1943 and ultimately settled in the United States, where he would spend the rest of his life, having taught Russian at Indiana University (1960–1967).

From 1967 to 1983, Siadnioŭ worked for Radio Liberty, heading its Belarusian edition.

== Exoneration and death ==
Siadnioŭ was exonerated from all charges by the Supreme Court of Belarus in 1992.

He died in the United States on 5 February 2001 and was buried in the Belarusian cemetery of South River, New Jersey.

== Bibliography ==
- Ля ціхай брамы : Вершы [At the Quiet Gate: Poems], 1955;
- Ачышчэньне агнём : вершы [Purification by fire: poems], 1985;
- Раман Корзюк : Раман [Raman Karziuk: Novel], 1985;
- І той дзень надыйшоў : Раман [And that day came: Novel], 1987;
- А часу больш,чым вечнасць : Вершы ([And more time than eternity: Poems], 1989;
- Патушаныя зоры : вершы, раман [Extinguished Stars: Poems, Novel], 1992;
- Масеева кніга : Успаміны,старонкі дзенніка,эсэ (Masiej's (Moses') book: Memoirs, diary pages, essays], 1994;
- Выбраныя творы / Масей Сяднёў [Selected works/ Masiej Siadnioŭ], 2014;
- Масей Сяднёў: pro et contra [Masiej Siadnioŭ: pro et contra], 2018.
