= Klichaw =

Town in Mogilev Region, Belarus

Klichaw Клічаў (Belarusian) Кличев (Russian)
- Town
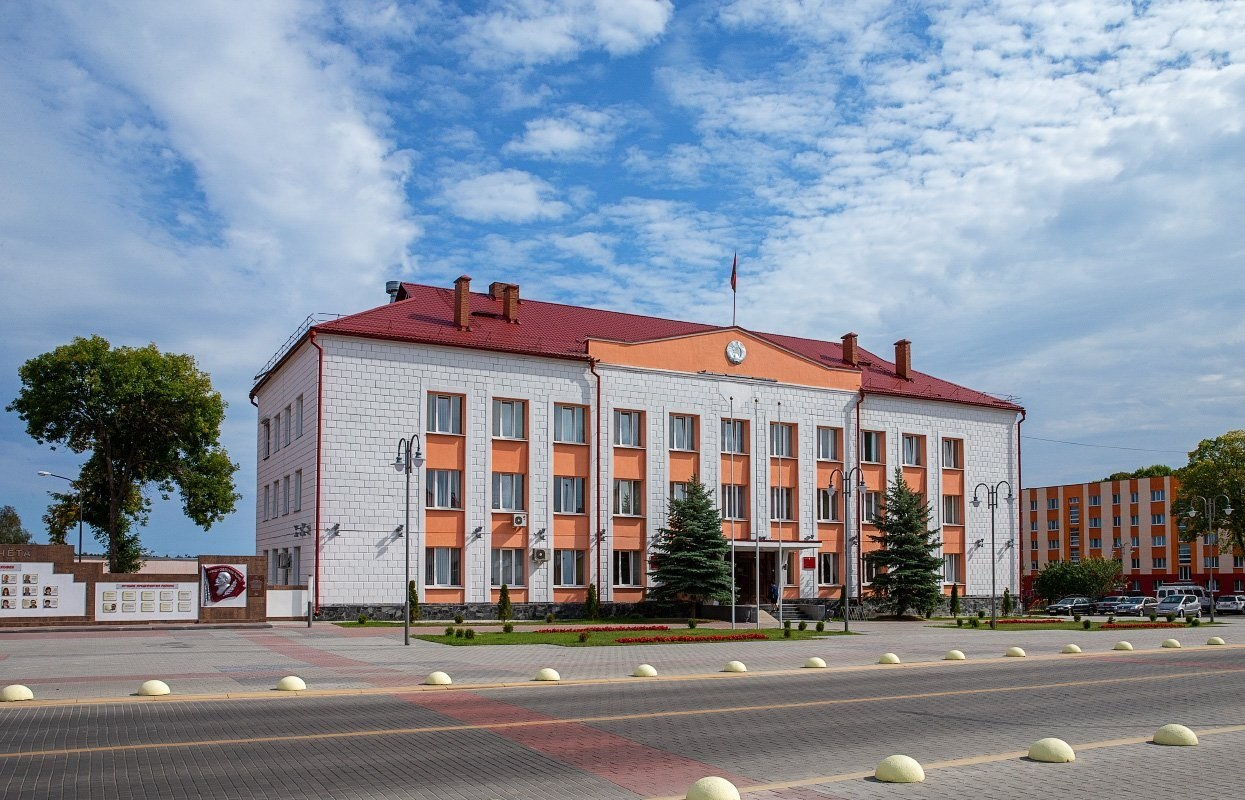
- Town hall

- Flag Coat of arms

- Location within Belarus
- Coordinates: 53°29′N 29°20′E
- Country: Belarus
- Region: Mogilev Region
- District: Klichaw District

Population (2025)
  - Total: 7,249
- Time zone: UTC+3 (MSK)
- License plate: 6

Klichaw (Belarusian: Клічаў, romanized: Kličaŭ; Russian: Кличев, romanized: Klichev; Polish: Kliczew) is a town in Mogilev Region, in east-central Belarus. It is located in the southwest of the region and serves as the administrative center of Klichaw District. In 2009, its population was 7,521. As of 2025, it has a population of 7,249.

== History ==
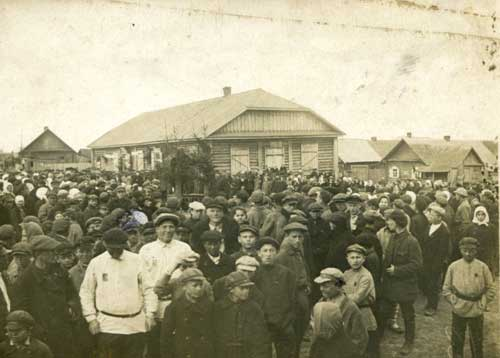
Klichaw in the 1920s

Klichaw is known since 1592. At the time it was a village, Klichevo, which belonged to Vitebsk Voivodeship. In September 1772, as a result of the First Partition of Poland, the town was transferred to the Russian Empire and became a part of Minsk Governorate. On July 17, 1924 the governorate was abolished as well, and Klichaw became the administrative center of Klichaw Raion, which belonged to Bobruysk Okrug of Byelorussian Soviet Socialist Republic. On January 15, 1938 the raion was transferred to Mogilev Region. In 1938, Klichaw was granted an urban-type settlement status.

During the Second World War, the town was occupied by German troops. On October 14 1941, the Germans took all of Klichaw's Jews to the edge of the woods near Poplavy. There, they shot them. Later, however, Klichaw raion became one of the centers of the partisan activity. In March 1942, the settlement went under complete control of partisans, and later they even opened Klichaw airport for flights. In 1944, the German troops were moved west of Klichaw, and on September 20, 1944 the settlement was included in the newly established Bobruysk Region, which was abolished in 1954. Klichaw was then returned to Mogilev Oblast. In 2000, it was granted town status.

== Economy ==
=== Industry ===
In Klichaw, there are enterprises in the food and timber industries.

=== Transportation ===
Klichaw is connected by highways with Mogilev, Babruysk, and Berazino. The closest railway station is Neseta on the railroad connecting Mogilev and Asipovichy, several kilometers northwest of Klichaw.

== Culture and recreation ==
In Klichaw, there is a Jewish cemetery. The Annunciation Church was built in the 1990s.

== Climate ==
Climate data for Klichaw (1991–2020)
Month	Jan	Feb	Mar	Apr	May	Jun	Jul	Aug	Sep	Oct	Nov	Dec	Year
Record high °C (°F)	4.5 (40.1)	5.3 (41.5)	13.2 (55.8)	23.1 (73.6)	27.9 (82.2)	30.5 (86.9)	31.7 (89.1)	31.6 (88.9)	26.4 (79.5)	20.1 (68.2)	11.5 (52.7)	6.2 (43.2)	31.7 (89.1)
Mean daily maximum °C (°F)	−1.9 (28.6)	−0.8 (30.6)	4.8 (40.6)	13.5 (56.3)	19.6 (67.3)	23.1 (73.6)	25.0 (77.0)	24.2 (75.6)	18.2 (64.8)	10.9 (51.6)	3.7 (38.7)	−0.6 (30.9)	11.6 (52.9)
Daily mean °C (°F)	−4.6 (23.7)	−4.1 (24.6)	0.4 (32.7)	7.5 (45.5)	13.3 (55.9)	16.9 (62.4)	18.7 (65.7)	17.6 (63.7)	12.3 (54.1)	6.5 (43.7)	1.1 (34.0)	−3.0 (26.6)	6.9 (44.4)
Mean daily minimum °C (°F)	−7.5 (18.5)	−7.3 (18.9)	−3.5 (25.7)	2.2 (36.0)	7.2 (45.0)	10.9 (51.6)	12.8 (55.0)	11.5 (52.7)	7.1 (44.8)	2.8 (37.0)	−1.2 (29.8)	−5.4 (22.3)	2.5 (36.5)
Record low °C (°F)	−23.1 (−9.6)	−20.9 (−5.6)	−13.4 (7.9)	−4.5 (23.9)	−0.5 (31.1)	3.9 (39.0)	7.6 (45.7)	4.6 (40.3)	−1.1 (30.0)	−5.8 (21.6)	−11.4 (11.5)	−16.5 (2.3)	−23.1 (−9.6)
Average precipitation mm (inches)	39.0 (1.54)	34.2 (1.35)	35.4 (1.39)	37.0 (1.46)	53.2 (2.09)	68.1 (2.68)	90.0 (3.54)	60.0 (2.36)	48.7 (1.92)	58.2 (2.29)	41.8 (1.65)	38.3 (1.51)	603.9 (23.78)
Average precipitation days (≥ 1.0 mm)	10.1	9.4	8.6	7.2	8.8	10.1	10.7	8.0	7.8	9.2	8.8	10.3	109.0
Source: NOAA
