= Kastsyukovichy district =

District of Mogilev region, Belarus

Coordinates: 53°20′20″N 32°02′46″E

Kastsyukovichy district Касцюковіцкі раён (Belarusian) Костюковичский район (Russian)
- District
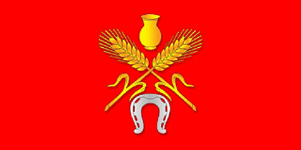
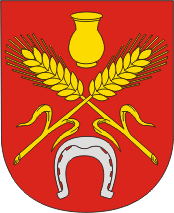
- Flag Coat of arms

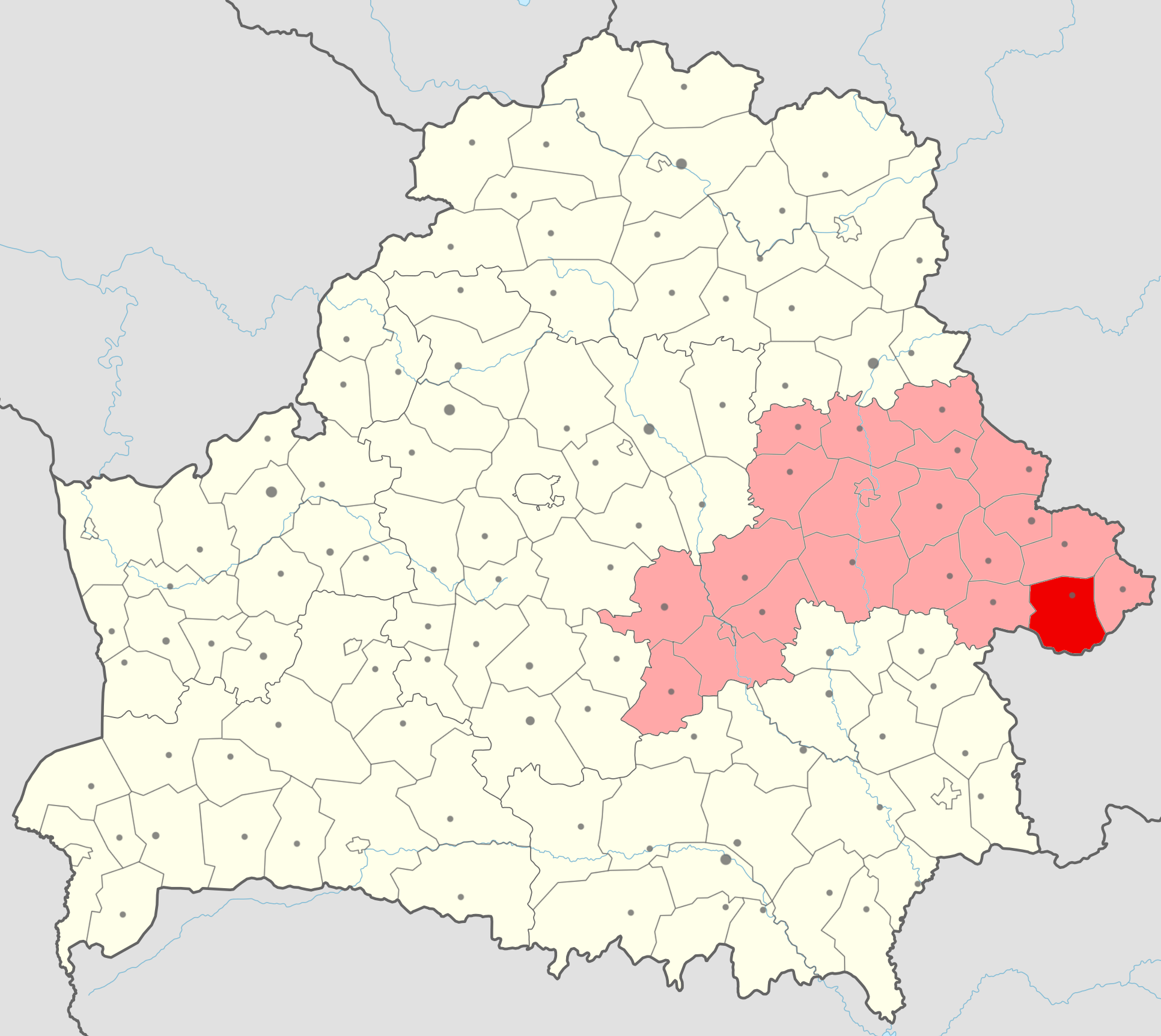
- Country: Belarus
- Region: Mogilev region
- Administrative center: Kastsyukovichy

Area
  - Total: 1,493.84 km^{2} (576.77 sq mi)

Population (2023)
  - Total: 21,673
  - Density: 14.508/km^{2} (37.576/sq mi)
- Time zone: UTC+3 (MSK)

Kastsyukovichy district or Kasciukovičy district (Belarusian: Касцюковіцкі раён; Russian: Костюковичский район, romanized: Kostyukovichsky rayon) is a district (raion) of Mogilev region in Belarus. The administrative center is the town of Kastsyukovichy. As of 2009, its population was 26,410. The population of Kastsyukovichy accounts for 60.6% of the district's population.

== History ==
As a result of the Chernobyl disaster, part of the district's territory became contaminated, and the inhabitants were resettled. In the area, several settlements remained uninhabited.

== Notable people ==
- Masiej Siadnioŭ (1915, Mokraje village – 2001), Belarusian poet and novelist, victim of the Gulag
