= Slawharad =

Slawharad Слаўгарад (Belarusian) Славгород (Russian) Slavgorod
- Town
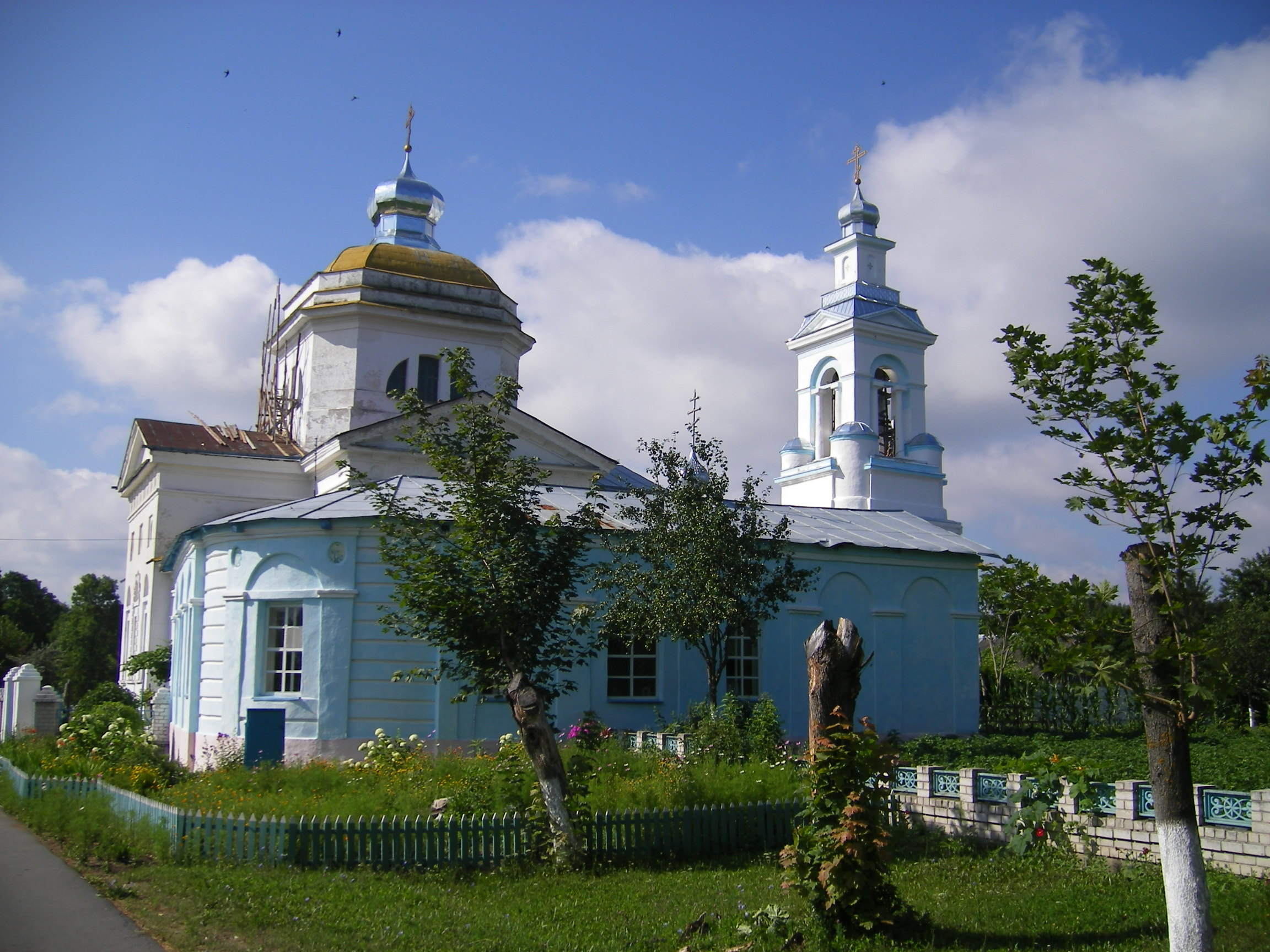
- Church of the Nativity of the Theotokos (1791–1793)

- Flag Coat of arms

- Location of Slawharad in Belarus
- Coordinates: 53°26′N 31°00′E
- Country: Belarus
- Region: Mogilev Region
- District: Slawharad District

Population (2025)
  - Total: 7,647
- Time zone: UTC+3 (MSK)
- License plate: 6

Slawharad or Slavgorod (Belarusian: Слаўгарад, romanized: Slaŭharad; Russian: Славгород; Polish: Sławograd) is a town in Mogilev Region, eastern Belarus. It is located in the east of the region, on the banks of the Sozh River at the confluence with the Pronya River, and serves as the administrative center of Slawharad District. In 2009, its population was 7,992. As of 2025, it has a population of 7,647.

== History ==
Slawharad was first mentioned in the chronicles in 1136 as Prupoy. It was also mentioned later under the names of Proposhensk, Propolsk, and Propoysk.

In the 14th century, Propoysk became a part of the Grand Duchy of Lithuania, where it was a part of Mstsislaw Voivodeship. From 1569 to 1772, Propoysk, like the rest of the Grand Duchy of Lithuania, were part of the Polish–Lithuanian Commonwealth. Propoysk was badly damaged during the Russo-Polish War (1654–1667). In September 1772, as a result of the First Partition of Poland, the town was transferred to the Russian Empire and became a part of Mogilev Governorate. It was the center of Propoyskaya Volost of Bykhovsky Uyezd.

As of 1881, the population of Propoysk was 3,400. In the 19th century, the town was one of major centers of iron production, however, the production stopped in 1872. It was also an important river port.

=== 20th century ===
In 1919, Mogilev Governorate was abolished, and Slawharad was transferred to Gomel Governorate. On 17 July 1924, the governorate was abolished as well, and Propoysk became the administrative center of Propoysk Raion, which belonged to Mogilev Okrug of Byelorussian Soviet Socialist Republic. On 15 January 1938, the raion was transferred to Mogilev Region. In January 1939, the population of Propoysk included 1,038 Jews, 22 percent of the total population. During the Second World War, the town was occupied by German troops and severely damaged. The Jews of the town were murdered in several operations in November 1941.

On May 23, 1945, Propoysk was renamed Slawharad (Slavgorod), and Propoysk Raion was renamed Slawharad Raion. In 1986, it was considerably affected by the Chernobyl disaster.

== Economy ==
=== Industry ===
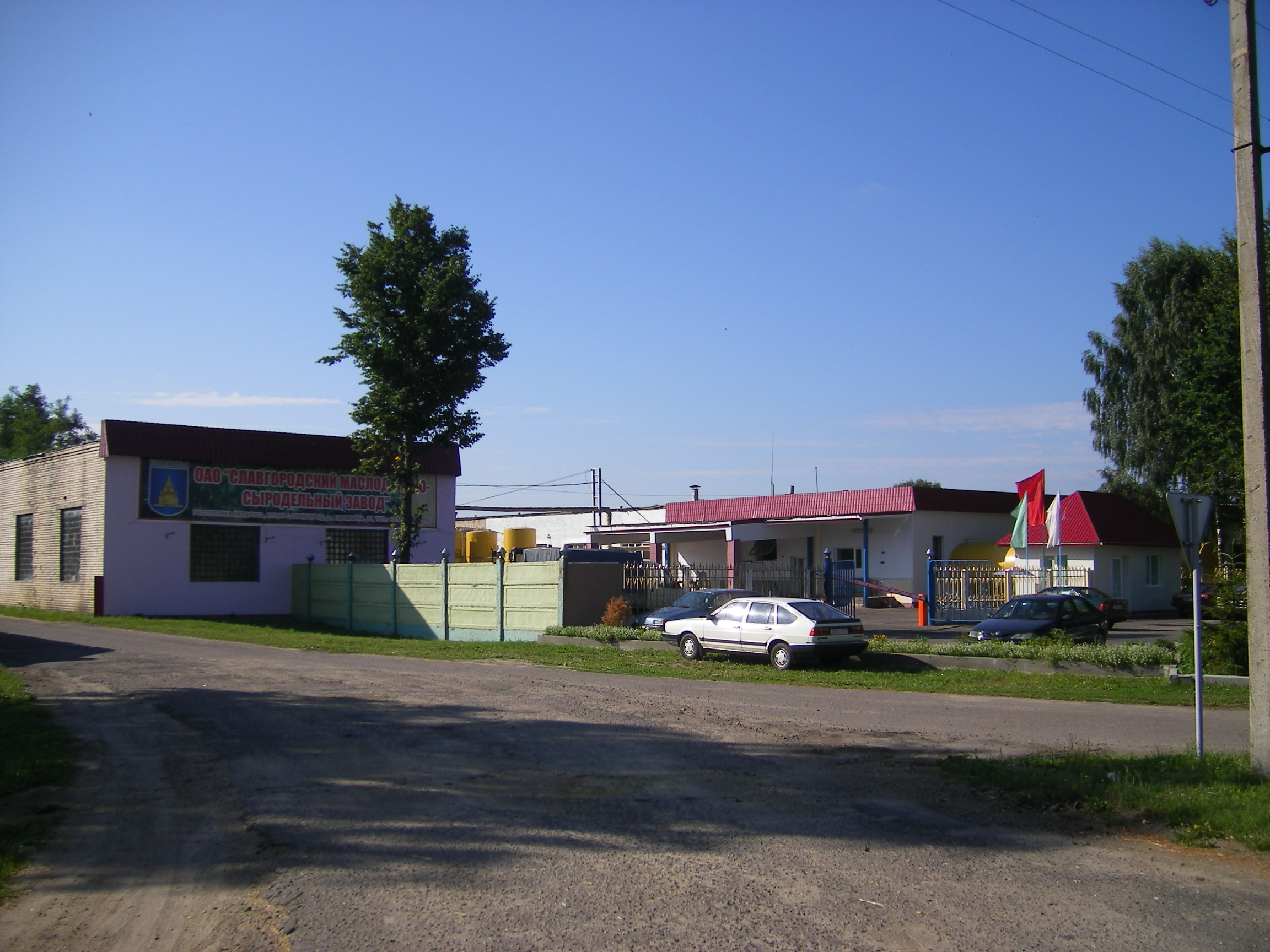
Slawharad cheese factory.

The industry in Slawharad produces food and serves local agriculture.

=== Transportation ===
The town is located on the highway connecting Roslavl in Russia with Bobruysk. There are also road connections with Mogilev, Chavusy, and Bykhaw.

== Culture and recreation ==
The Propoysk Castle did not survive, but its location, the Castle Hill, between the Sozh and the Pronya, is an archaeological monument. There are several monuments of architecture which were built in the 18th and the 19th century. The most notable one is the Church of the Nativity of the Theotokos (1791–1793), located close to the Castle Hill.

== Notable people ==
- Ivan Zyatkov (1926 – 2009). Belarusian physicist. His main areas of research were infrared spectroscopy and spectroscopy of organic compounds. Zyatkov and his students have published over 200 papers on the results of their research.
- Alexander Gomanov (born 1955). Belarusian architect. He was the author and co-author of many construction projects, including the Military Department Building on Yakub Kolas Street, the administrative building on Lynkova Street, and the hotel on Traktornaya Street in Minsk; hotels in Riga, among others.
- Valentina Ivankova (born 1953). Belarusian ceramic artist. She participated in the creation of ceramic household items for the Adam Mickiewicz Estate Museum in Zaosie. Drawing on traditional Belarusian forms, she created sets of household utensils: jugs, bowls, mugs, and candlesticks.
- Gennady Govor (born 1938). Belarusian physicist. Scientific work on structural and magnetic phase transformations in solids, development of new magnetic materials. Author of over 100 scientific publications.
- Anatoly Murashkevich (born 1937). Belarusian architect. Designed major projects: the administrative and amenity building of the Minsk Bearing Plant; the administrative and laboratory building of the Gazoapparat plant in Brest; the Borok Pioneer Camp in the Minsk region, and others.
- Leonid Gomonov (born 1953). Belarusian artist. Works in the fields of painting, book illustration, and poster design. Author of paintings. The themes of his works are highly topical: environmental issues and social issues. He has made a significant contribution to the revival of Belarusian national culture.

== Climate ==
Climate data for Slawharad (1991–2020)
Month	Jan	Feb	Mar	Apr	May	Jun	Jul	Aug	Sep	Oct	Nov	Dec	Year
Record high °C (°F)	3.6 (38.5)	4.8 (40.6)	12.5 (54.5)	22.3 (72.1)	27.3 (81.1)	29.6 (85.3)	31.0 (87.8)	31.0 (87.8)	25.9 (78.6)	19.8 (67.6)	10.7 (51.3)	5.6 (42.1)	31.0 (87.8)
Mean daily maximum °C (°F)	−2.6 (27.3)	−1.5 (29.3)	4.1 (39.4)	12.9 (55.2)	19.2 (66.6)	22.8 (73.0)	24.8 (76.6)	23.8 (74.8)	17.8 (64.0)	10.4 (50.7)	3.1 (37.6)	−1.3 (29.7)	11.1 (52.0)
Daily mean °C (°F)	−4.9 (23.2)	−4.4 (24.1)	0.3 (32.5)	7.8 (46.0)	13.8 (56.8)	17.4 (63.3)	19.3 (66.7)	18.2 (64.8)	12.7 (54.9)	6.5 (43.7)	0.8 (33.4)	−3.3 (26.1)	7.0 (44.6)
Mean daily minimum °C (°F)	−7.2 (19.0)	−7.1 (19.2)	−3.0 (26.6)	3.3 (37.9)	8.6 (47.5)	12.1 (53.8)	14.2 (57.6)	12.9 (55.2)	8.3 (46.9)	3.3 (37.9)	−1.2 (29.8)	−5.4 (22.3)	3.2 (37.8)
Record low °C (°F)	−21.0 (−5.8)	−18.7 (−1.7)	−11.5 (11.3)	−3.3 (26.1)	1.2 (34.2)	5.8 (42.4)	9.2 (48.6)	6.8 (44.2)	0.9 (33.6)	−4.7 (23.5)	−11.0 (12.2)	−15.8 (3.6)	−21.0 (−5.8)
Average precipitation mm (inches)	38.1 (1.50)	36.0 (1.42)	37.5 (1.48)	37.7 (1.48)	65.4 (2.57)	76.1 (3.00)	88.6 (3.49)	62.6 (2.46)	52.1 (2.05)	58.1 (2.29)	46.8 (1.84)	42.7 (1.68)	641.7 (25.26)
Average precipitation days (≥ 1.0 mm)	9.5	9.3	8.1	7.0	9.7	9.6	9.7	7.8	7.7	9.3	8.6	10.3	106.6
Source: NOAA
