= Kastsyukovichy =

Town in Mogilev Region, Belarus

Kastsyukovichy Касцюковічы (Belarusian) Костюковичи (Russian)
- Town
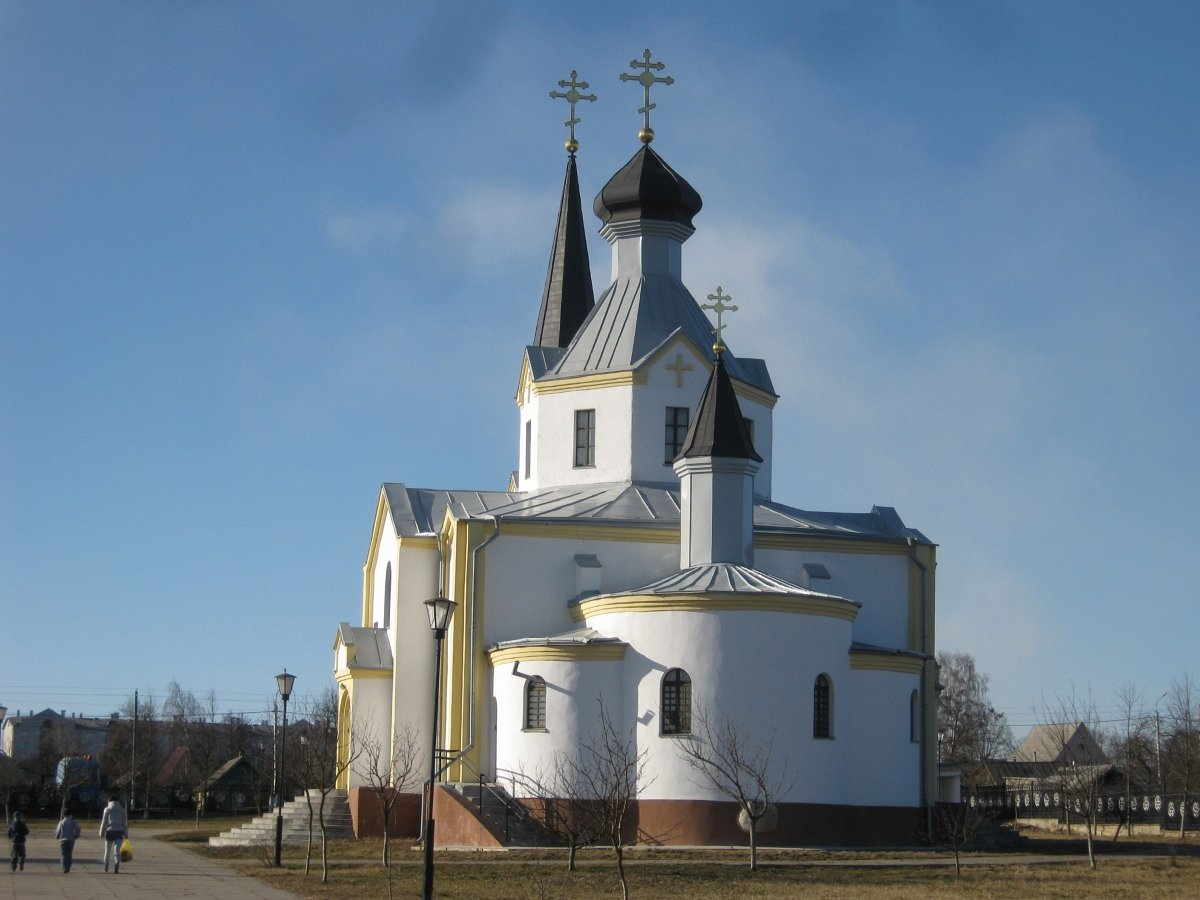

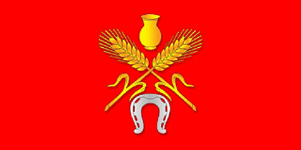
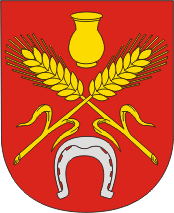
- Flag Coat of arms

- Location within Belarus
- Coordinates: 53°20′N 32°03′E
- Country: Belarus
- Region: Mogilev Region
- District: Kastsyukovichy District

Population (2025)
  - Total: 14,757
- Time zone: UTC+3 (MSK)
- License plate: 6

Kastsyukovichy (Belarusian: Касцюковічы, romanized: Kasciukovičy; Russian: Костюковичи, romanized: Kostyukovichi; Polish: Kościukowicze) is a town in Mogilev Region, eastern Belarus. It is located in the east of the region, close to the border with Russia, and serves as the administrative center of Kastsyukovichy District. In 2009, its population was 15,993. As of 2025, it has a population of 14,757.

== History ==
Kastsyukovichy was first mentioned in a chronicle in 1508. It belonged to Poland, and in 1772, as a result of the First Partition of Poland, it was transferred to Russia. In the middle of the 19th century it had a population of 1700 and was the administrative center of Kostyukovichskaya Volost of Klimovichsky Uyezd, Mogilev Governorate. In 1919, Mogilev Governorate was abolished, and Kastsyukovichy was transferred to Gomel Governorate. On July 17, 1924 the governorate was abolished, and Kastsyukovichy became the administrative center of Kastsyukovichy Raion, which belonged to Kalinin Okrug of Byelorussian Soviet Socialist Republic. In July, 1927, Kalinin Okrug was abolished, and Kastsyukovichy was transferred into Mogilev Okrug. On January 15, 1938 the raion was transferred to Mogilev Region. In 1938, Kastsyukovichy was granted the town status. During the Second World War, the town was occupied by German troops and severely damaged.

The Jewish community of the village had 1,181 members before the war. The Germans occupied the town and kept the Jews imprisoned in a ghetto. They were forced to work in the quarry-sand. In November 1941, 350 Jews were murdered in a mass execution in the Orthodox cemetery perpetrated by an Einsatzgruppen. On September 3, 1942, the Jews were brought outside of the town when the Germans shot them in groups of 50 into pits. Before being shot, the Jews were forced to undress, and policemen and Germans collected their valuables. In March 1943, another 161 Jews were shot near the rope factory. On April 14 and 15, 1943, policemen from the town shot another 14 Jews.

In 1986, it was considerably affected by the Chernobyl disaster.

== Economy ==
=== Industry ===
In Kastsyukovichy, there is a cement plant, as well as several enterprises of food industry, including alcohol production.

=== Transportation ===
Kastsyukovichy has a railway station on the railroad connecting Orsha with Unecha via Krychaw. South of the town, the railroad crosses the state border and enters Russian Federation.

The town is well served by roads. One road connects it to Klimavichy on the north and eventually to the highway connecting Roslavl in Russia with Bobruysk. Another one crosses the border and runs to Surazh.

== Culture and recreation ==
In Kastsyukovichy, some buildings survived from the 19th and the beginning of the 20th century. There is a Jewish cemetery. The Church of the Erection of the Cross was built in the 1990s.

== Notable people ==
- Zyama Pivovarov (1910–1937) was a Belarusian poet and translator. He began writing poetry in Belarusian in 1925. He published in Leningrad journals and Belarusian almanacs. He translated poems by Pushkin and Axelrod into Belarusian and worked as a theater reviewer.

== Climate ==
Climate data for Kastsyukovichy (1991–2020)
Month	Jan	Feb	Mar	Apr	May	Jun	Jul	Aug	Sep	Oct	Nov	Dec	Year
Record high °C (°F)	3.4 (38.1)	4.7 (40.5)	12.4 (54.3)	22.5 (72.5)	27.4 (81.3)	29.5 (85.1)	31.1 (88.0)	31.2 (88.2)	26.0 (78.8)	20.2 (68.4)	10.8 (51.4)	5.4 (41.7)	31.2 (88.2)
Mean daily maximum °C (°F)	−2.8 (27.0)	−1.7 (28.9)	4.0 (39.2)	13.0 (55.4)	19.5 (67.1)	22.8 (73.0)	24.8 (76.6)	23.9 (75.0)	17.9 (64.2)	10.4 (50.7)	2.9 (37.2)	−1.4 (29.5)	11.1 (52.0)
Daily mean °C (°F)	−5.2 (22.6)	−4.7 (23.5)	0.0 (32.0)	7.6 (45.7)	13.6 (56.5)	17.1 (62.8)	19.0 (66.2)	17.8 (64.0)	12.3 (54.1)	6.3 (43.3)	0.6 (33.1)	−3.6 (25.5)	6.7 (44.1)
Mean daily minimum °C (°F)	−7.7 (18.1)	−7.8 (18.0)	−3.6 (25.5)	2.6 (36.7)	7.8 (46.0)	11.5 (52.7)	13.4 (56.1)	12.0 (53.6)	7.5 (45.5)	2.7 (36.9)	−1.6 (29.1)	−5.8 (21.6)	2.6 (36.7)
Record low °C (°F)	−22.4 (−8.3)	−20.7 (−5.3)	−13.1 (8.4)	−3.9 (25.0)	0.7 (33.3)	4.9 (40.8)	8.4 (47.1)	5.6 (42.1)	0.1 (32.2)	−5.7 (21.7)	−11.9 (10.6)	−17.0 (1.4)	−22.4 (−8.3)
Average precipitation mm (inches)	38.7 (1.52)	36.4 (1.43)	34.6 (1.36)	37.3 (1.47)	65.2 (2.57)	76.3 (3.00)	85.9 (3.38)	56.4 (2.22)	58.6 (2.31)	63.8 (2.51)	46.4 (1.83)	42.9 (1.69)	642.5 (25.30)
Average precipitation days (≥ 1.0 mm)	9.8	9.8	8.6	6.8	9.3	9.4	10.3	7.8	8.1	9.3	9.1	10.6	108.9
Mean monthly sunshine hours	43.5	68.3	150.7	198.3	263.3	282.6	282.5	248.2	166.3	90.8	33.5	26.3	1,854.3
Source: NOAA
