= Slawharad district =

District of Mogilev region, Belarus

Coordinates: 53°26′43″N 30°59′47″E

Slawharad district Слаўгарадскі раён (Belarusian) Славгородский район (Russian)
- District
- Flag Coat of arms

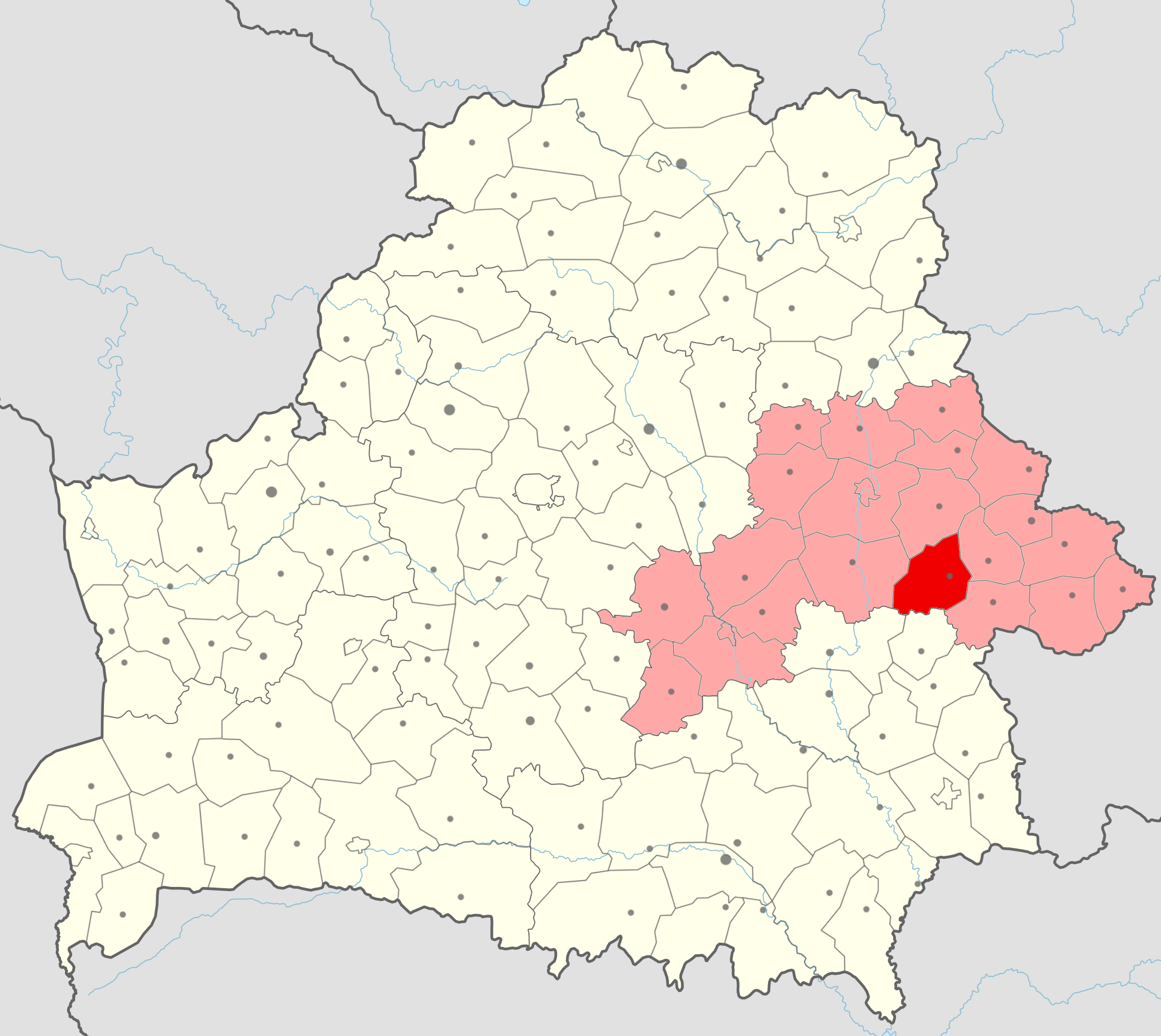
- Country: Belarus
- Region: Mogilev region
- Administrative center: Slawharad

Area
  - Total: 1,317.82 km^{2} (508.81 sq mi)

Population (2023)
  - Total: 12,393
  - Density: 9.4042/km^{2} (24.357/sq mi)
- Time zone: UTC+3 (MSK)

Slawharad district or Slaŭharad district (Belarusian: Слаўгарадскі раён; Russian: Славгородский район, romanized: Slavgorodsky raion) is a district (raion) of Mogilev region in Belarus. The administrative center is the town of Slawharad. As of 2009, its population was 14,888. The population of Slawharad accounts for 53.7% of the district's population.

== History ==
As a result of the Chernobyl disaster, part of the district's territory became contaminated, and the inhabitants were resettled. In the area, several settlements remained uninhabited.
