= Mogilev region =

Region of Belarus

Coordinates: 53°54′N 30°20′E

Mogilev region Магілёўская вобласць (Belarusian) Могилёвская область (Russian)
- Region
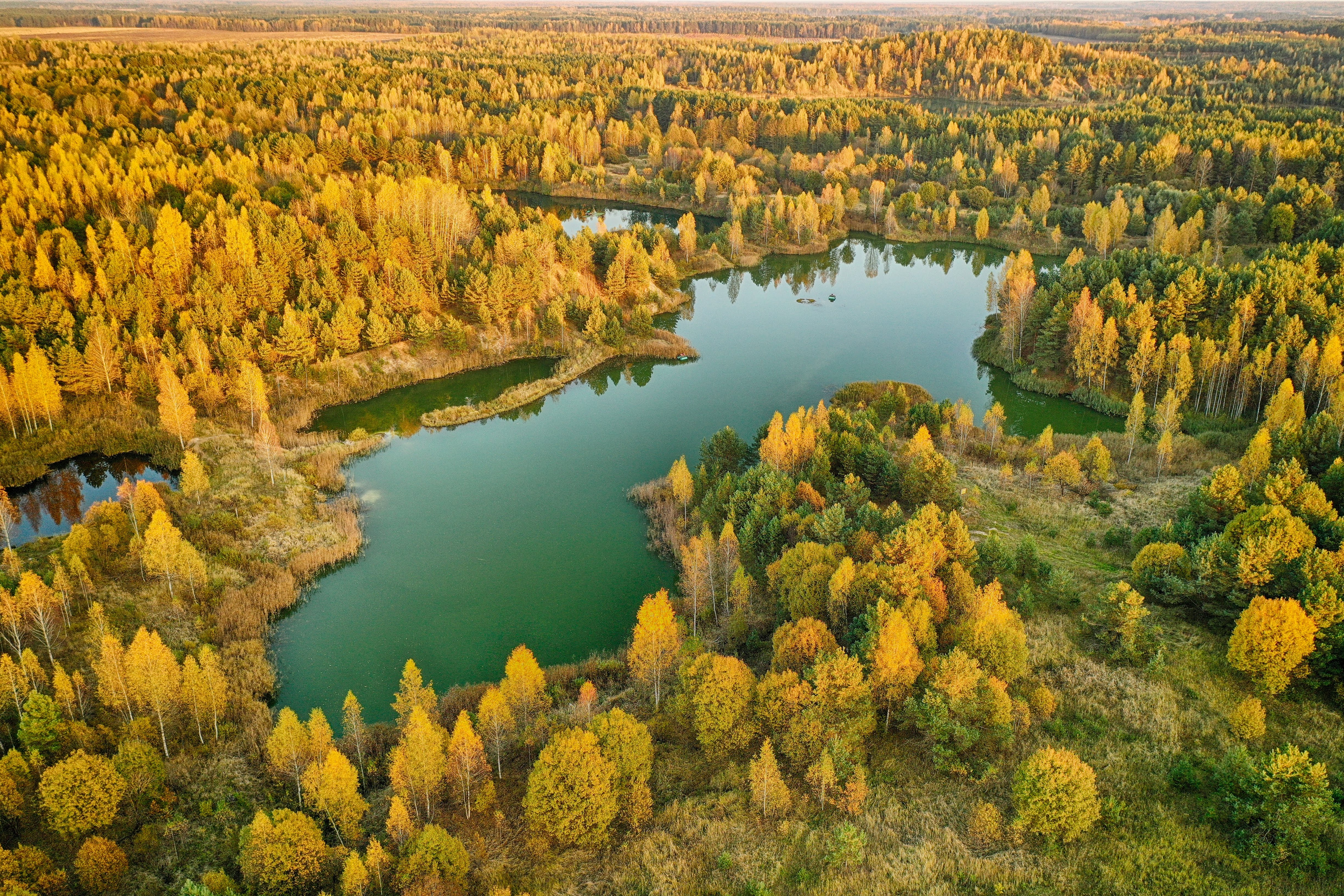
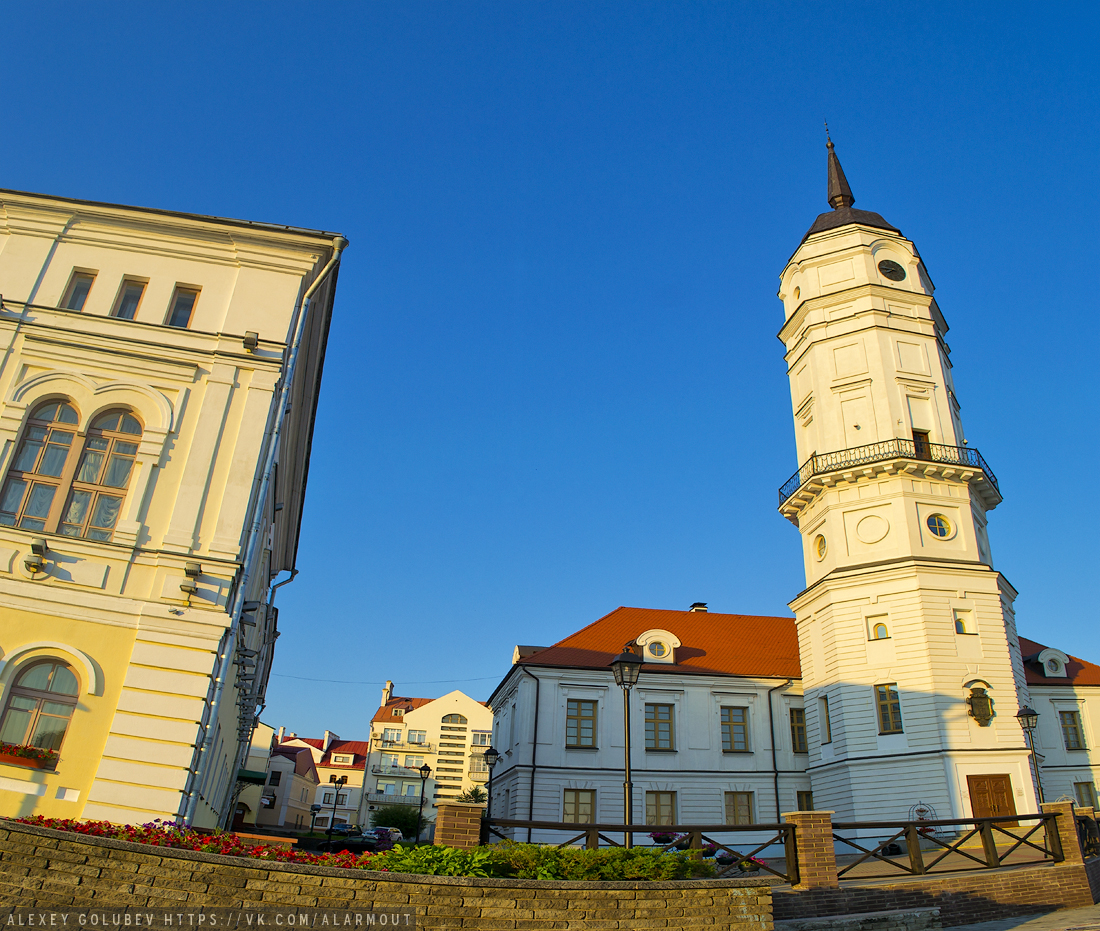
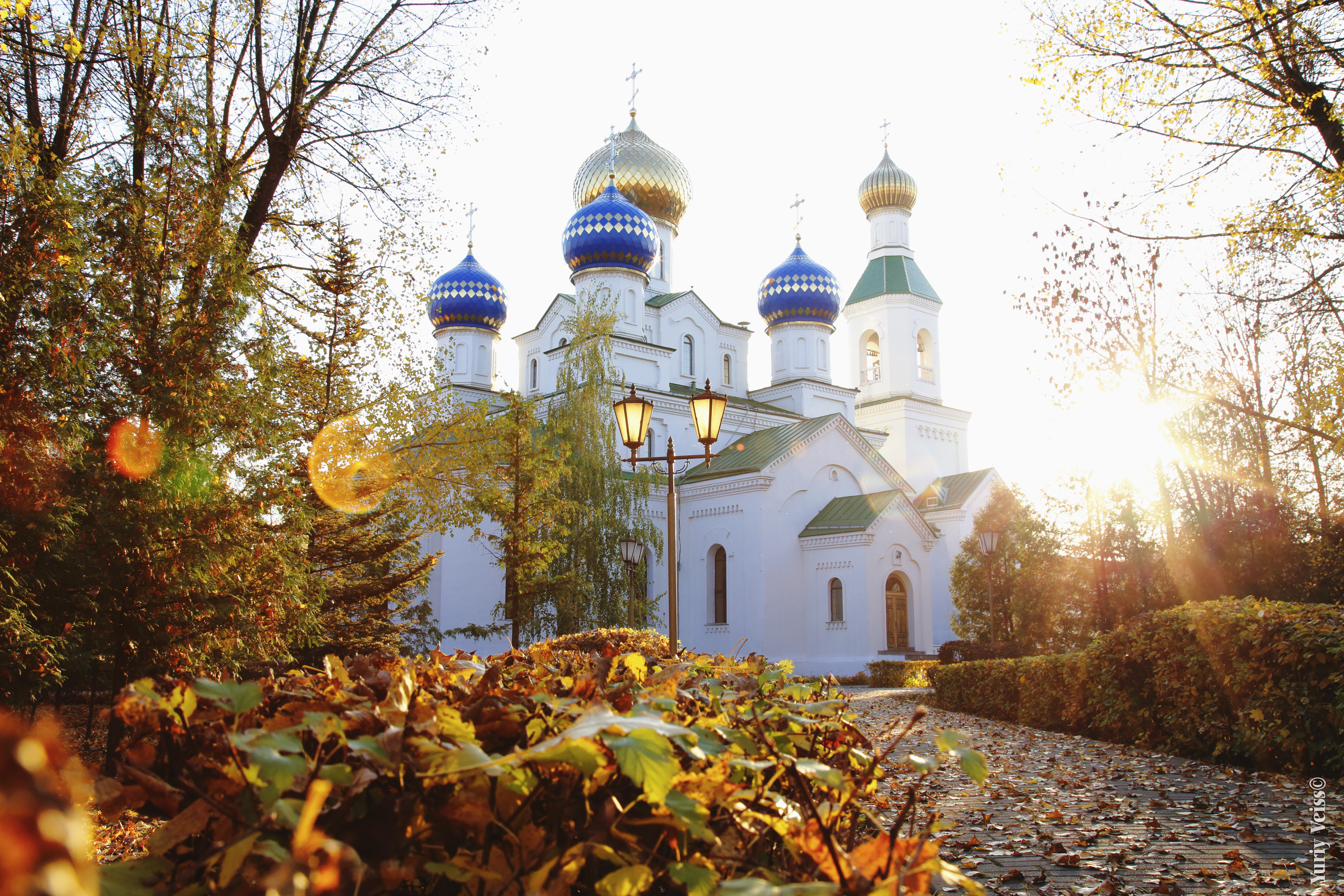
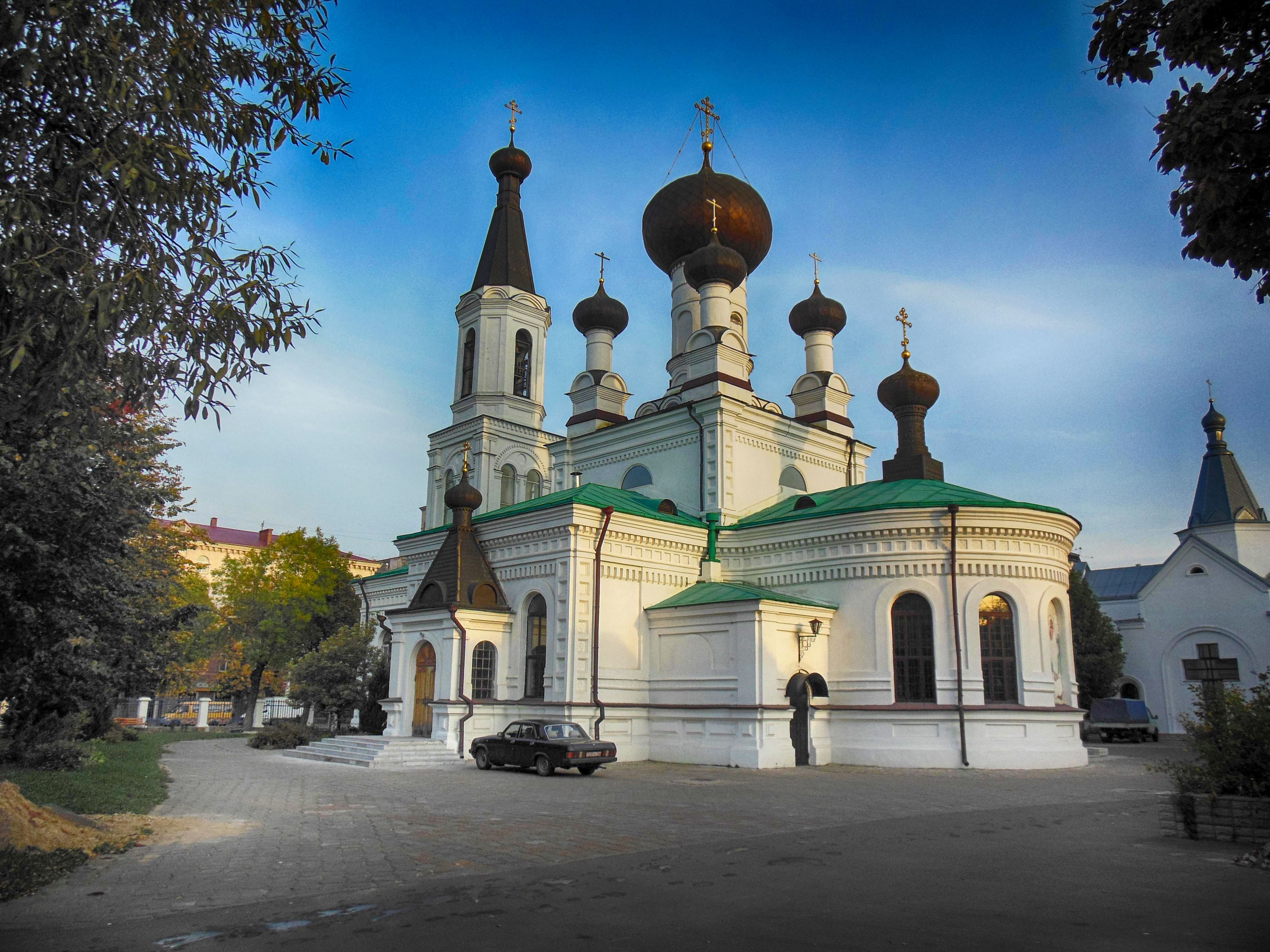
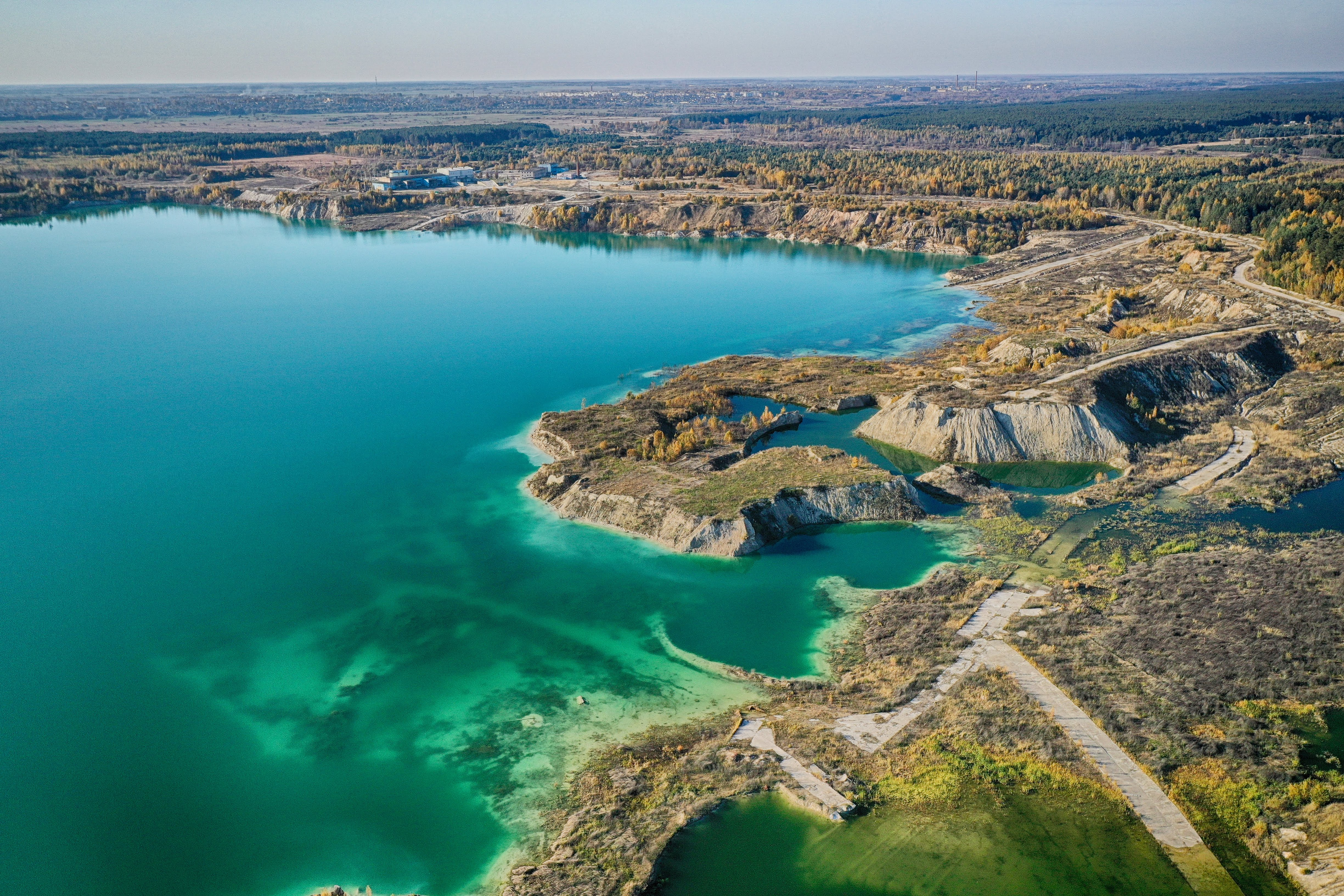
- From the top to bottom-right: Klimavichy District, Mogilev City Hall, Church of Saint Nicholas, Church of the Three Holy Hierarchs, Krychaw District

- Flag Coat of arms

- Interactive map of Mogilev region
- Country: Belarus
- Administrative center: Mogilev
- Largest cities: Mogilev - 365,100; Babruysk - 220,800; Asipovichy - 34,700
- Districts: 21; Towns - 14; Urban localities - 12
- City districts: 3

Government
  - Chairman: Anatoly Isachenko

Area
  - Total: 29,079.01 km^{2} (11,227.47 sq mi)
- Highest elevation: 239 m (784 ft)
- Lowest elevation: 126 m (413 ft)

Population (2024)
  - Total: 981,174
  - Density: 33.7417/km^{2} (87.3905/sq mi)

GDP (nominal,2024)
  - Total: Br 19.452 billion (US$5.958 billion)
  - Per capita: Br 19,925 (US$6,103)
- ISO 3166 code: BY-MA
- HDI (2022): 0.790 high · 6th
- Website: mogilev-region.gov.by

Mogilev region, also known as Mogilev oblast (Note: Russian: Могилёвская область, romanized: Mogilyovskaya oblast'.) or Mahilyow voblasts, (Note: Belarusian: Магілёўская вобласць, romanized: Mahilioŭskaja voblasć.) is one of the regions of Belarus. Its administrative center is the city of Mogilev.

Important cities within the region include Mogilev, Asipovichy and Babruysk.

== Geography ==
Within Belarus, Mogilev region borders Vitebsk region (to the north), Minsk region (to the west), and Gomel region (to the south). It has international borders with the Russian Federation (Smolensk Oblast to the east and Bryansk Oblast to the south-east).

Mogilev region covers a total area of 29,100 square kilometres (11,200 sq mi), about 14% of the national total. The region's greatest extent from north to south comprises 150 kilometres (93 mi), from east to west – 300 kilometres (190 mi), while the highest point is 239 metres (784 ft) above sea level and the lowest at 126 metres (413 ft) above sea level.

Many rivers flow through the Mogilev region, including the Dnieper (Dniapro), Berezina, Sozh, Druts, Pronia and Ptsich. The oblast also has small lakes, the largest being the Zaozerye Lake with a surface area of 0.58 square kilometres (0.22 sq mi). The Chigirin Reservoir on the Druts River has an area of 21.1 square kilometres (8.1 sq mi).

The extreme eastern point of Belarus is situated within the Mogilev region to the east of the Khotimsk District.

=== Climate ===
Mogilev region has a temperate continental climate, with cold winters and warm summers. January's average temperature ranges from −8.2 °C (17.2 °F) in the northeast to −6.5 °C (20.3 °F) in the southwest. July's average temperature ranges from 17.8 °C (64.0 °F) in the northeast to 18.7 °C (65.7 °F) in the southwest. The region's average yearly vegetative period lasts around 183–194 days. The average precipitation is 575–675 millimetres (22.6–26.6 in) a year, with approximately 70% falling during the warm season (April–October).

== Demographics ==
With a total population of 1,088,100 (2011), 353,600 inhabitants live in rural areas and 855,000 live in cities or towns. There are 639,300 women and 567,300 men in the region, of which 288,100 are under 18 while 267,300 are elderly people.

Of the major nationalities living in the Mogilev region, 1,044,000 inhabitants are Belarusians, 132,000 are Russians, 3,500 are Jewish, 2,800 are Poles, 2,110 are Ukrainians, 1,700 are Tatars, 1,300 are Lithuanians, 1,100 are Armenians, and 1,070 are Romani.

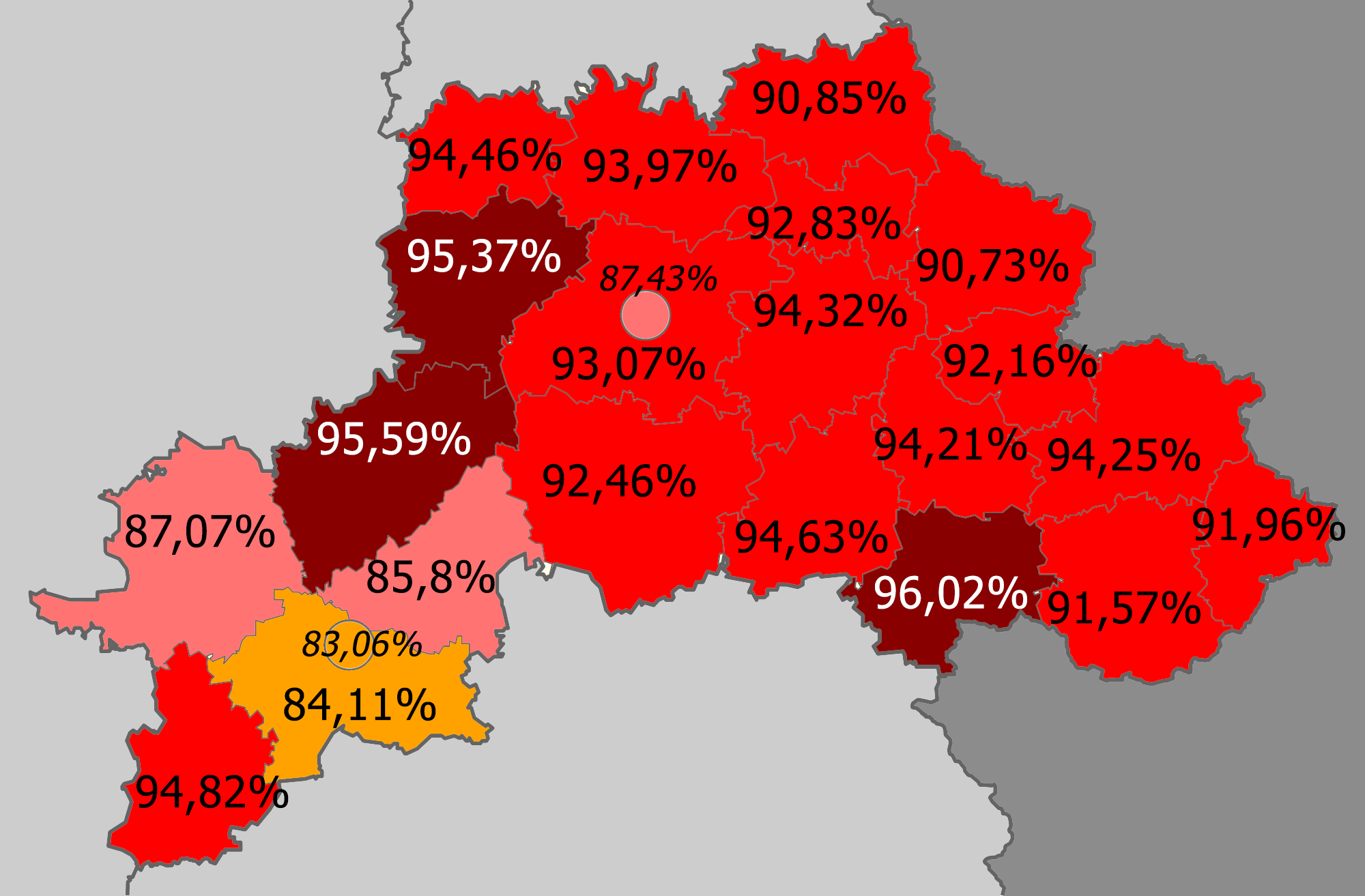
Belarusians in the region
>95%
90–95%
85—90%
<85%

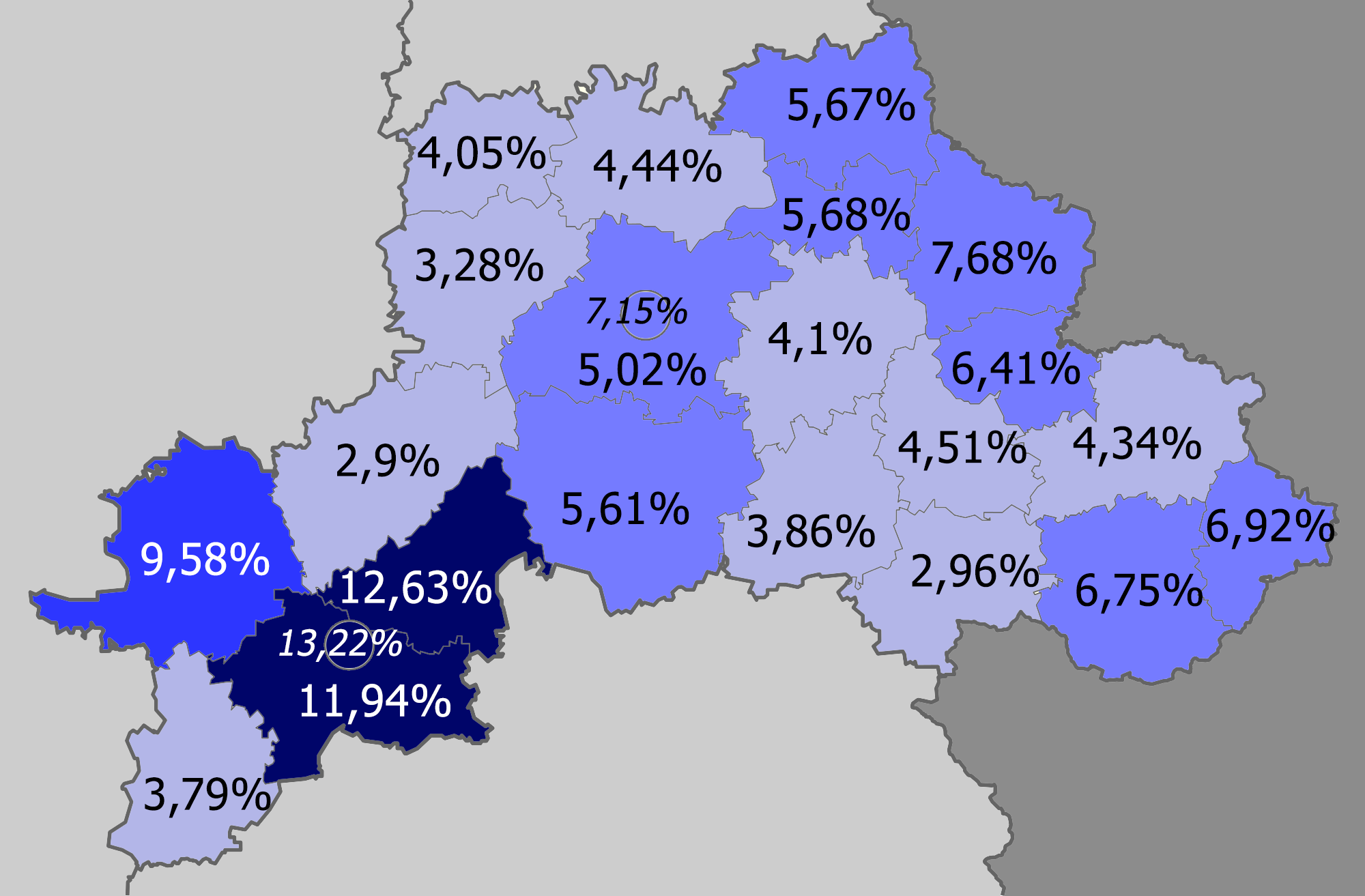
Russians in the region
>10%
8–10%
5–8%
<5%

== Tourism ==
The number of travel agencies in Mogilev region has grown from 20 in 2000 to 50 in 2010, 12 of which provide agent services, the others are tour operators. Mogilev region hosts 3-4% of all the organized tourist arrivals to the Republic of Belarus. The most popular cities to visit in the region are Mogilev and Bobruisk.

== Administrative subdivisions ==
Today the region consists of 21 districts (raions), 195 selsovets, 14 towns, 3 city municipalities, and 12 urban-type settlements.

=== Districts of Mogilev region ===
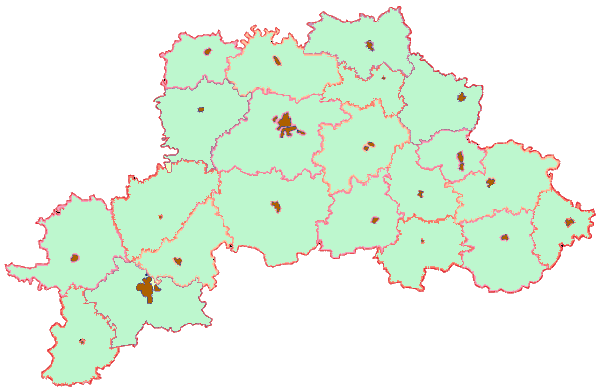
Map of the administrative subdivisions of the Mogilev region

The 21 districts of Mogilev region are:

- Asipovichy District
- Babruysk District
- Byalynichy District
- Bykhaw District
- Chavusy District
- Cherykaw District
- Drybin District
- Hlusk District
- Horki District
- Kastsyukovichy District
- Khotsimsk District
- Kirawsk District
- Klichaw District
- Klimavichy District
- Krasnapollye District
- Kruhlaye District
- Krychaw District
- Mogilev District
- Mstsislaw District
- Shklow District
- Slawharad District

=== Cities and towns ===
Population of cities and towns in Mogilev region according to 2023 estimates.

English	Belarusian	Russian	Pop. (2023)
Mogilev	Магілёў	Могилёв	360,918
Babruysk	Бабруйск	Бобруйск	208,611
Asipovichy	Асiповiчы	Осиповичи	29,329
Horki	Горкі	Горки	29,152
Krychaw	Крычаў	Кричев	23,469
Bykhaw	Быхаў	Быхов	16,426
Klimavichy	Клiмавiчы	Климовичи	15,121
Kastsyukovichy	Касцюковічы	Костюковичи	15,089
Shklow	Шклоў	Шклов	14,989
Mstsislaw	Мсьціслаў	Мстиславль	10,069
Chavusy	Чавусы	Чаусы	9,994
Byalynichy	Бялынічы	Белыничи	9,749
Kirawsk	Кіраўск	Кировск	7,971
Slawharad	Слаўгарод	Славгород	7,840
Cherykaw	Чэрыкаў	Чериков	7,774
Klichaw	Клічаў	Кличев	7,321
Kruhlaye	Круглае	Круглое	7,315

== Consequences of the Chernobyl Nuclear Power Plant disaster ==
During the elimination of the consequences of the Chernobyl disaster, as of 2010, residents of 141 settlements in the Mogilev region were evacuated, and 88 settlements were buried. In the post-accident period, more than 21,500 people were resettled to clean areas of the republic, leading to a decrease in the region 's population by about 7%. The most contaminated areas are the Bykhaw, Kastsyukovichy, Krasnapollye, Slawharad, and Cherykaw districts; these areas are contaminated not only with cesium-137, the main dose-forming nuclide, but also with strontium-90. In 14 districts of the Mogilev region, 11,200 km² of territory became radioactively contaminated: Byalynichy, Babruysk, Bykhaw, Kirov, Klimavichy, Klichaw, Kastsyukovichy, Krasnapollye, Krychaw, Krugloe, Mogilev, Slawharad, Chavusy, and Cherykaw district, which accounts for 38.6% of the total area of the region. At the beginning of 2010, nearly 119,500 people lived in 778 settlements in areas of radioactive contamination.
