= Winnefeld (abandoned village) =

Human settlement in Germany

Coordinates: 51°41′20″N 9°28′34″E

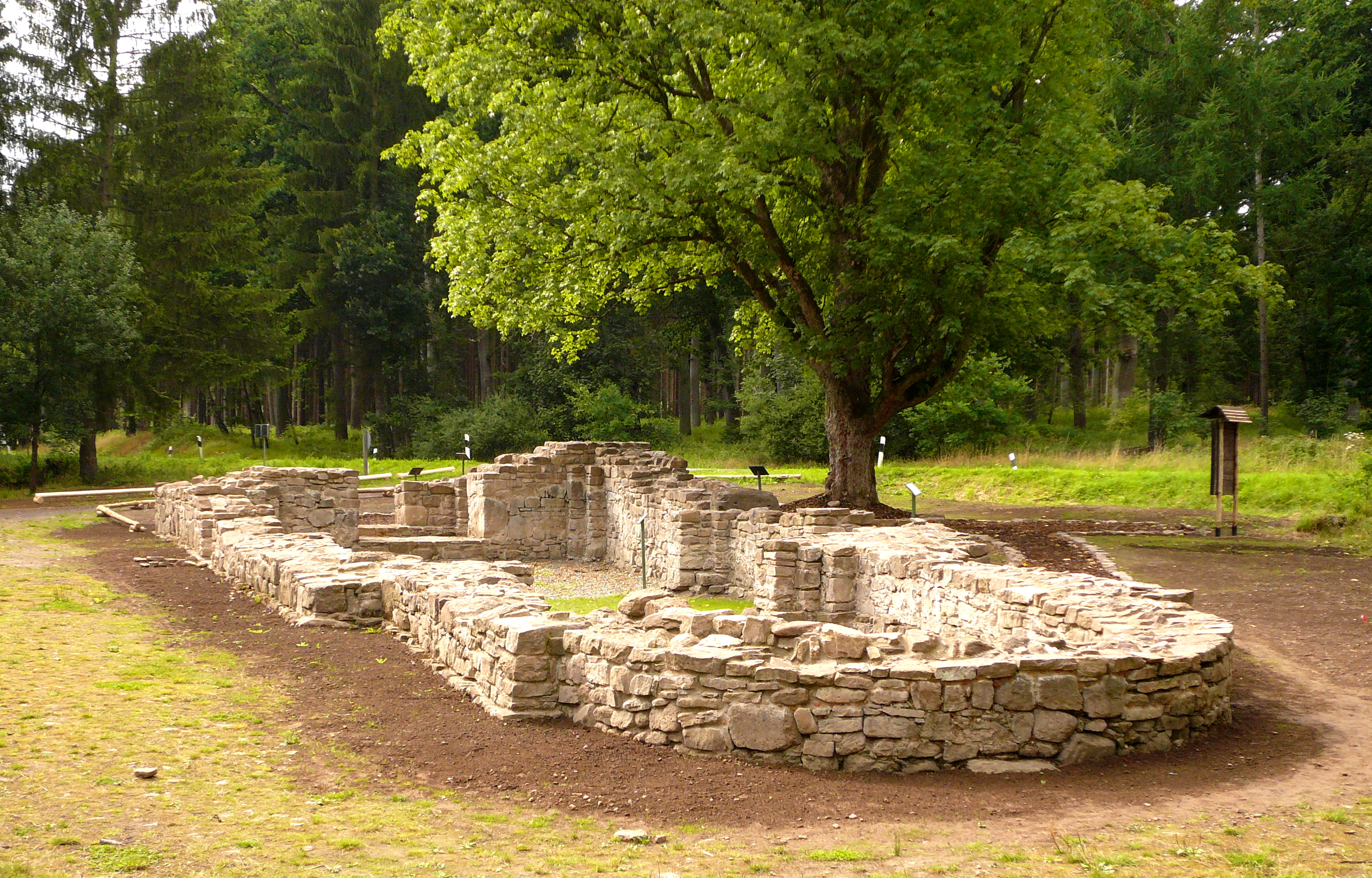
Winnefeld church ruin

Winnefeld is an abandoned village in the district of Northeim in Lower Saxony, Germany.

== Geography ==
The site of the former village lies inmidst the Solling mountain range right at the Bundesstraße 241, where the ground ist made up of Loess. The nearest populated places are Lauenförde and Nienover.

== History ==
According to results of archaeological digs by Hans-Georg Stephan and soil studies, the site used to be a wood pasture in the 8th century. Between 1150 and 1250, the Counts of Dassel had the woods cut area-wide, thus allowing agriculture and settlement of people. Some 25 to 40 farms developed there, probably to provide Nienover with food.

The village was destroyed in 1342 by water of the Reiherbach amidst the St. Mary Magdalene's flood.

== Church ruin ==
The village had a church that was built of stone in the years around 1200 in romanesque architectural style. The aisle had two bays. The choir was rectangular. The height of the tower was 15 to 20 meters by estimation. In the early modern period, people tore down the church in order to pave the street passing by. In 2006, the local historical society reconstructed the foundation walls of the church.
