= Lüthorst =

Coordinates: 51.8460°N 9.7229°E

Lüthorst is a village in Lower Saxony. It is a suburb of Dassel and was incorporated into this city in 1974. It is located between the Amtsberge and the Elfas hills.

== History ==
The foundation of Lüthorst dates back to the 9th century, when it was a part of the Suilbergau area. Throughout the Middle Ages, both the Counts of Dassel and lords who had their castle in the Homburg Forest, had influence on the village. In the decades after 1310, when the Counts of Dassel ceased to exist, the Lords of Homburg expanded their influence and expelled some of the inhabitants from the village. As the Roman Catholic Diocese of Hildesheim was the successor of the county of Dassel, bishop Gerhard tried to limit the influence of those lords. So did Pope Gregory XI, who mandated the abbot of the Reinhausen monastery. However the lords prevailed and the expelled inhabitants of Lüthorst settled in Lindau. Several years later they undertook an attack against the lords, burning down 14 villages around Lüthorst. Six of these became abandoned villages. Early in the 15th century the lords became extinct. The Dukes of Grubenhagen were their heirs, because duke Otto II had married the widow of the last lord of Homburg. The remaining farmers of Lüthorst had to serve them according to the fief rights. They became independent farmers as a result of the Prussian Agricultural reforms early in the 19th century.

== Main sights ==
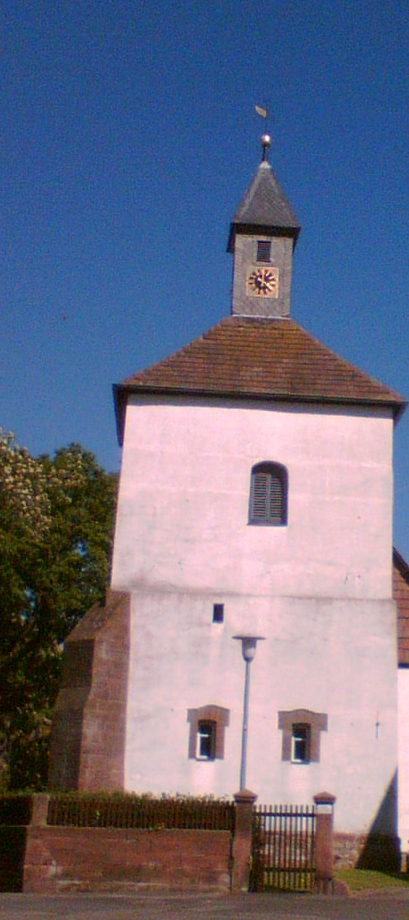
medieval church tower

- The local church is devoted to Magnus of Füssen. In the Middle Ages, people believed that he could help them against the wilderness surrounding the village. The tower of the church is dated into the 10th century. The choir stems from 1504 while the middle part of the church was built in 1732. The church had two bells both from 1316, but only one is left because the Nazis melted the other one in 1942.
- In memory of Wilhelm Busch, who lived here from time to time between 1846 and 1897, a showroom can be visited.

== Notable people ==
=== born here ===
- Ludwig Adolf Petri, was born here in 1803
- Adolf Just, was born here in 1859
- Rüdiger Butte, was born here in 1949

=== lived here ===
- Johannes Letzner, lived here between 1583 and 1589
- Wilhelm Busch, lived here from time to time between 1846 and 1897
