= Mackensen (Dassel) =

Coordinates: 51°49′N 9°40′E

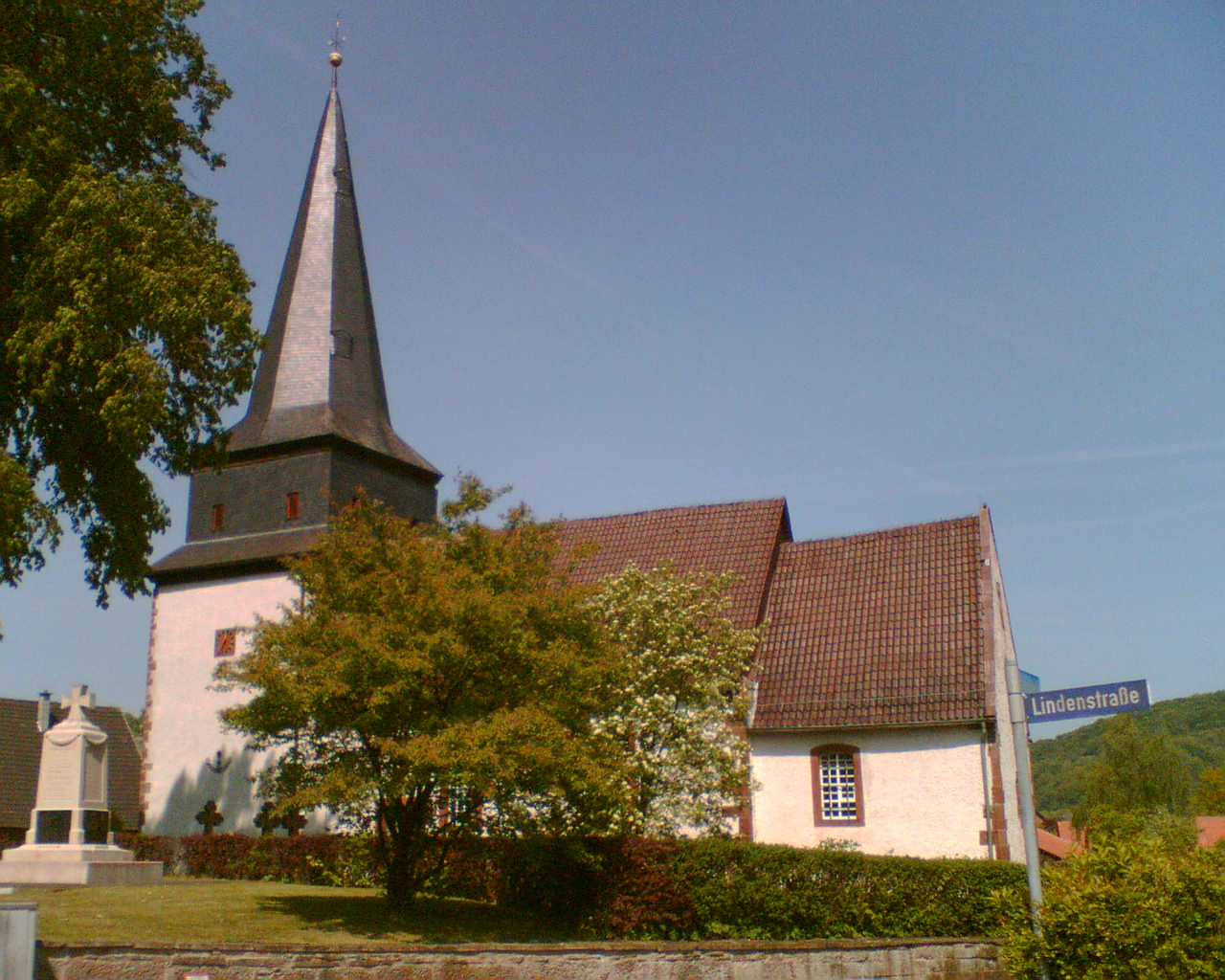

Mackensen is a village of about 450 inhabitants which is incorporated into the city of Dassel (Northeim district, Germany) since 1974.

This village lies at the east side of the Solling mountains. The name Mackensen is a derivation of Makkonhusun, which in medieval times in the eastphalian language meant: village of a man named Makko.

It was mentioned in a written list of Corvey Abbey in the 9th century. In the Middle Ages, it was a part of the Suilbergau district, their men being ministeriales of the Counts of Dassel, who lived on the nearby Hunnesrück castle. Today Mackensen is located at the political border between the district of Northeim and the district of Holzminden (that border goes through a nearby hill named Heukenberg). In medieval times, Mackensen was located at a border, too, when it belonged to the Bishopric of Hildesheim, because the neighbouring territory of the Principality of Brunswick-Wolfenbüttel began nearby. Therefore, people constructed a church in their village devoted to Saint Christopher (patron of travellers) so that travellers could pray in that church before they continued their journey.

Coat of arms shows an ear and a two-handled hand saw on green background. These symbols remind that people were dependent from agriculture and the Solling woods in their history.
