= Reiherbach =

Reiherbach may refer to:

- Reiherbach (Weser), a river of Lower Saxony, Germany, tributary of the Weser
- Reiherbach (Lutter), a river of North Rhine-Westphalia, Germany, tributary of the Lutter
- Reiherbach (Edersee), a river of Hesse, Germany, tributary of the Edersee
