= Cape St. Gregory =

Headland in Newfoundland, Canada

Coordinates: 49°23′19.63″N 58°14′00.73″W

Location of Cape St. Gregory in Newfoundland

The Headland of Cape St. Gregory is north of the abandoned community of Chimney Cove of the west coast of the island of Newfoundland in the Canadian province of Newfoundland and Labrador.

The Cape is used by Department of Fisheries and Oceans as a demarcation point for fishery zones.

== See also ==
- Abandoned village
