= Bodenfelde Black Widow =

German serial killer duo

Lydia Lassen-Berge (born 1939) and her accomplice Siegmund Schlufter (born 1954 or 1955) were convicted of murdering four elderly men between 1994 and 2000 in Bodenfelde municipality, in Lower Saxony, Germany. Lassen-Berge was dubbed the Black Widow of Bodenfelde (German: Schwarze Witwe von Bodenfelde) by the German press.

== Murderers ==
The couple were Lydia L., a former prostitute born in 1939, and her assistant, Siegmund S.

Lydia invited older men to live with her in a relationship or as care for the elderly. She later murdered the men with Siegmund S.'s help. However, a turnaround occurred when her aide himself reported the crimes to the police, confessing his participation in them as well.

== Victims ==
The following relationships were assigned to Lydia L.:

- Ludwig G. from Biebertal. In 1983, he met the woman at the age of 82. In September 1985, he appointed Lydia his sole heir. He died in a hospital on 5 January 1986.
- Wilhelm S., a master mason from the Sauerland.
- Paul P., who died at the age of 83 in February 1991.
- Alois M.
- Günter S., 74, strangled in June 1994.
- Adolf B. from Melsungen, was suffocated with a pillow in September 1994.
- Paul G., first stunned by Lydia L. and then strangled by Siegmund S., in April 1995.
- Gerhard G., smothered with a plastic bag by the two offenders in his house in Völksen, near Hanover, on 13 July 2000.

== Trial ==
The court recognized the last four cases as murders. Lydia L. was sentenced to life imprisonment in 2009 by the District Court of Göttingen, and she is now serving in Vechta Prison. A revision submitted by her was unsuccessful.

Siegmund S. was sentenced to 12 years imprisonment, which he served in the Rosdorf correctional facility. By his own account, he said that he had been afraid of being poisoned.

In 2014, Lydia L. sued the new owner of her house, who was said to have disposed of personal belongings without her permission. The claim was dismissed by the court.

== See also ==
- List of serial killers by country
