= Nienover =

- Ortschaft of Bodenfelde
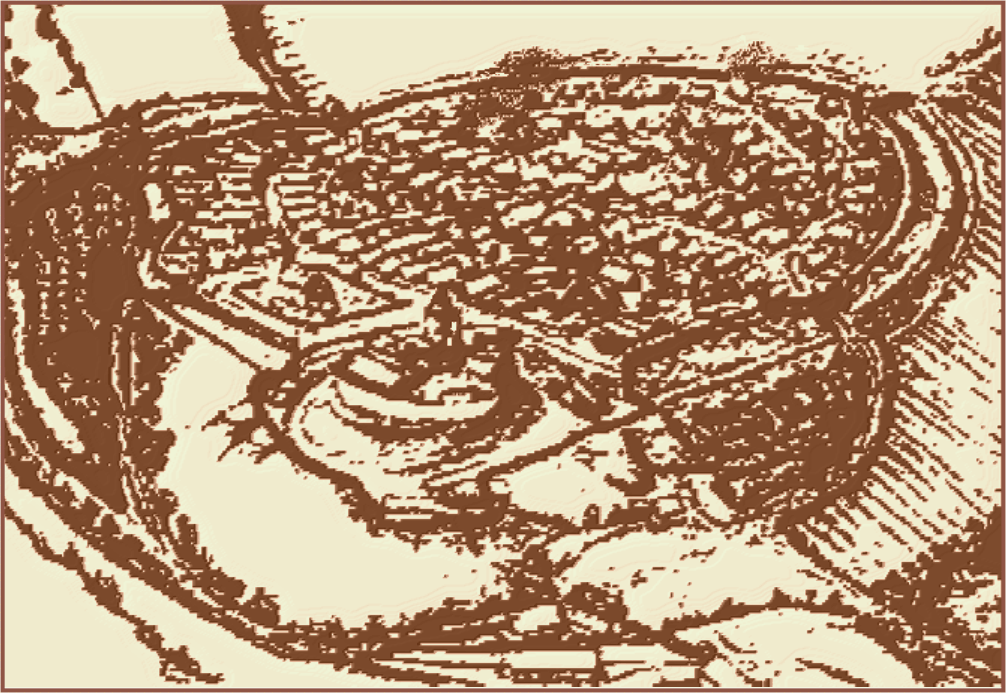
- Nienover and castle in 1215

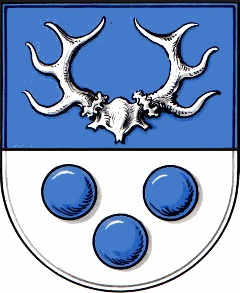
- Coat of arms
- Interactive map of Nienover
- Location within Germany Location within Lower Saxony
- Coordinates: 51°40′50″N 09°31′18″E
- Country: Germany
- State: Lower Saxony
- District: Northeim
- Municipality: Bodenfelde

Area
  - Total: 3.56 km^{2} (1.37 sq mi)
- Elevation: 175–210 m (574–689 ft)

Population (2021)
  - Total: 355
  - Density: 99.7/km^{2} (258/sq mi)
- Time zone: UTC+01:00 (CET)
  - Summer (DST): UTC+02:00 (CEST)
- Postal codes: 37194
- Dialling codes: 05572

Nienover is a rural village in the Solling region of Lower Saxony, Germany. It contains one of the largest deserted medieval towns in northern Europe. Nienover is an Ortschaft of the municipality Bodenfelde, which contains the villages Nienover, Amelith and Polier. It covers an area of 3.56 km^{2} (1.37 sq mi) and has 355 inhabitants (2021), most of which in Amelith.

== Local history ==
The area was used by Mesolithic hunters and gatherers. During the Neolithic period, the area was farmed. Later, during the Bronze and pre-Roman Iron Ages, there was scattered settlement. Permanent settlements came during the 8th and 9th centuries. Hethis, the site of what later became the Frankish Corvey Abbey, was founded in 815.

The Counts of Dassel founded their castle in Nienover c. 1100. About 1200, they chose the castle as their main residence and a town was founded to the west of it. The town was destroyed twice, first in 1220, probably by the Bishops of Paderborn and then by the Guelphs in 1270. Under pressure, the Counts of Dassel sold the rights of way to the House of Welf in 1270 and the castle was sold to the Principality of Brunswick-Wolfenbüttel in 1303. The castle was later destroyed in the Thirty Years' War (1618-1648.) The Guelphs then built a new castle, today owned by a horse breeding farm.

== Archaeological dig ==
Archaeologist Hans-Georg Stephan and his research team discovered an abandoned village, near the castle in 1992. No one in the neighboring towns had had any idea of the lost medieval village and the news caused a "sensation". The land was untouched, the medieval town having never been rebuilt, which made it an excellent site for archaeological exploration. The site has now become a large medieval archaeology project, at times involving some 90 archaeologists and assistants at once a total of several hundred over the years of the work.

Researchers and students, coming from several countries, have uncovered evidence of the defensive walls guarding the city and the town's three streets, which met at one end. Among the 150 buildings discovered, they have found pottery shards; items in silver, bronze and iron; coins; arrowheads and crossbow bolts. The researchers have also found evidence of a deep moat with the town wall. Remains of fire, the arrowheads and crossbow bolts tell of a violent struggle c. 1270 and the many coins and other items suggest the residents left hurriedly. Stephan reported finding a broken roll of coins in the corner of one cellar and in other houses, sterling from Canterbury, pennies from Corvey and pfennige from Mecklenburg and Pomerania.

Many of the houses had a furnace or foundry where the archaeologists found that large bronze bells, iron wheels, book clasps and jewelry had been cast, also metalsmiths where swords, lances, building hardware and nails were forged. The excavation also uncovered a brewery with a deep cellar and three wells. Initially, the archaeologists thought the residents abandoned the town because they had felled so many trees to fuel their forges and foundries and needed better access to more trees, but the researchers came to the conclusion that neither that nor the plague were the cause.

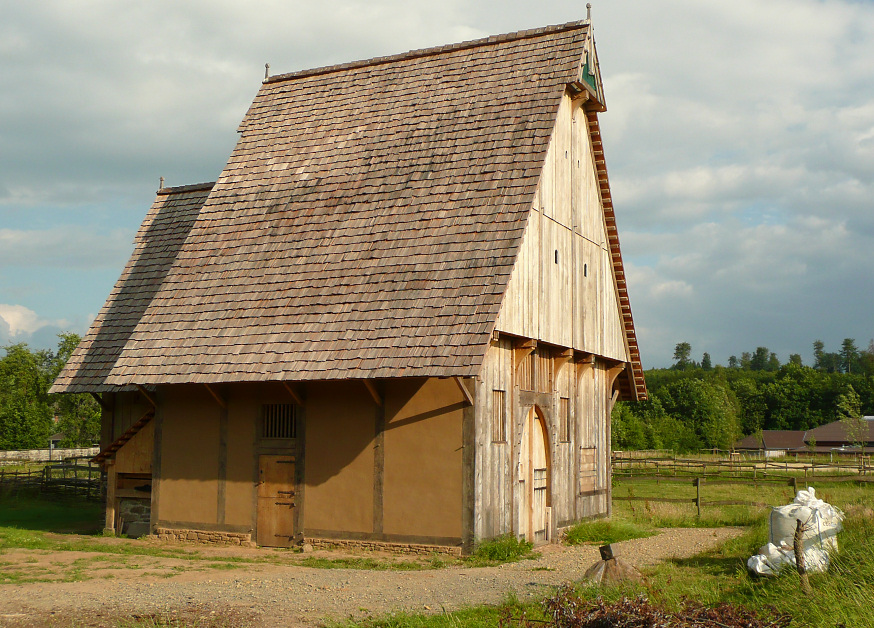
Reconstructed medieval house

In the Schmeeson Village Project, the remains of what appeared to be a church were excavated in 2005. Initially, Stephan and his team thought they had found a small, squarish building, but in 2004, the site was covered by brush. The local historical society, which supports the project, came out and cleared the site, allowing the researchers to see they had been standing on a mound of stones of various sizes. They also found evidence of plaster and mortar around the entire area. Their excavations in the summer of 2005 uncovered remains of a structure 9 by 16 meters (30 ft × 52 ft), with a considerable number of ceramic and metal finds. The 100 metal finds weighed over 20 kilograms (44 lb). In 2006, Arno Beyer of Kiel University took samples of soil from the site for further research. The trenches that were dug for this purpose went to the natural bedrock and revealed numerous postholes, as well as ceramic finds pre-dating the church, providing researchers with evidence of a community.

Excavation work in Nienover has produced finds dating earlier, as well. There have been prehistoric finds, such as burial mounds and pottery, as well as those dating from the 8th, 9th, 10th and 11th centuries.

A medieval-style house has been reconstructed over an excavated cellar by the building historian Hubertus Michels. It will be part of a recreated medieval environment showing the town as it would have looked in 1230, with buildings for work and business, animal stalls and garden area and costumed portrayals of village life. Construction is being supervised by Stephan and other researchers. The project will have historic preservation status.

== Excavation halted ==
The German state of Lower Saxony purchased the castle at Nienover in 2005, but sold it to Mireille van Meer, a Dutch horse breeder. Stephan, who spent twelve years researching and excavating the site, criticized Hartmut Möllring (CDU), state finance minister, for selling the castle at a "fire sale price" without bothering to secure the rights to continue the scientific work to its conclusion and ending "a unique opportunity in Germany" to investigate an untouched medieval site. As a result, a large part of the site's 150 buildings cannot be researched.

== See also ==
- Germanic peoples
