= Chimney Cove, Newfoundland and Labrador =

Coordinates: 49.428°N 58.144°W

Location of Chimney Cove in Newfoundland and Labrador

Chimney Cove is an abandoned community in the Canadian province of Newfoundland and Labrador, located to the south of Cape St. Gregory.
