= Rainald of Dassel =

Archbishop of Cologne and Archchancellor of Italy from 1159 to 1167

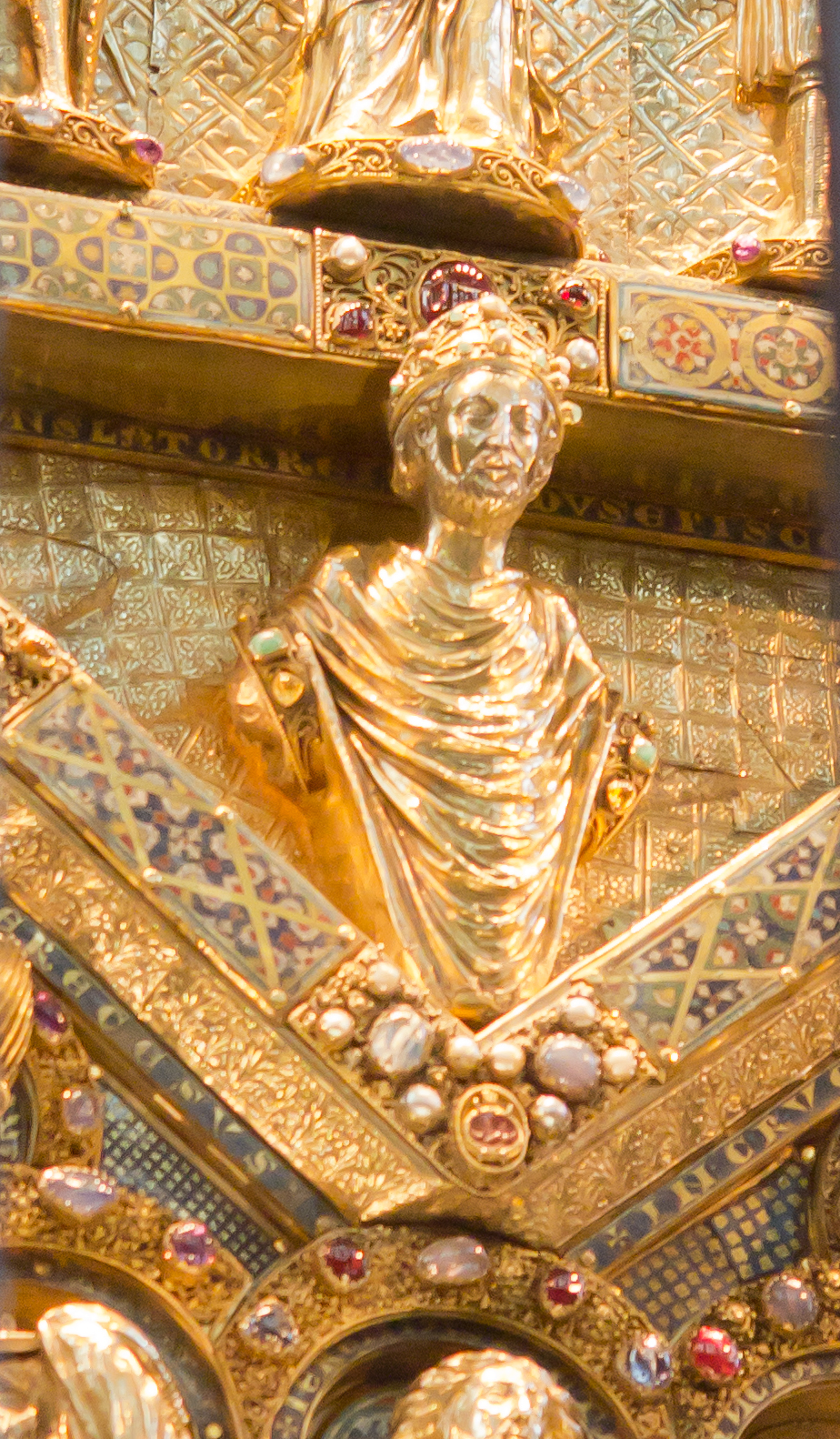
Portrait on the Shrine of the Three Kings, Cologne Cathedral

Rainald of Dassel (c. 1120 – 14 August 1167) was Archbishop of Cologne and Archchancellor of Italy from 1159 until his death. A close advisor to the Hohenstaufen emperor Frederick Barbarossa, he had an important influence on Imperial politics, mainly in the Italian conflict of Guelphs and Ghibellines.

== Life ==
Rainald was a scion of the Counts of Dassel, who had inherited large estates in the Suilbergau of Saxony upon the extinction of the ducal Billung dynasty in 1106. A younger son of the affluent count Reinold I of Dassel, he was destined as such to be an ecclesiastic, while his elder brother Ludolf succeeded in the Dassel county.

=== Ecclesiastical career ===
Rainald's father sent him to the Hildesheim Cathedral school and at a later date he probably went to Paris in France, where he studied with Adam of Balsham. As early as 1130 he is said to have had a high reputation for classical learning, and to have been a member of the Hildesheim cathedral chapter. He started working as a subdeacon under Bishop Bernard about 1146 and accompanied Abbot Wibald of Stavelot to the Roman Curia. According to documentary evidence he was appointed provost in 1148.

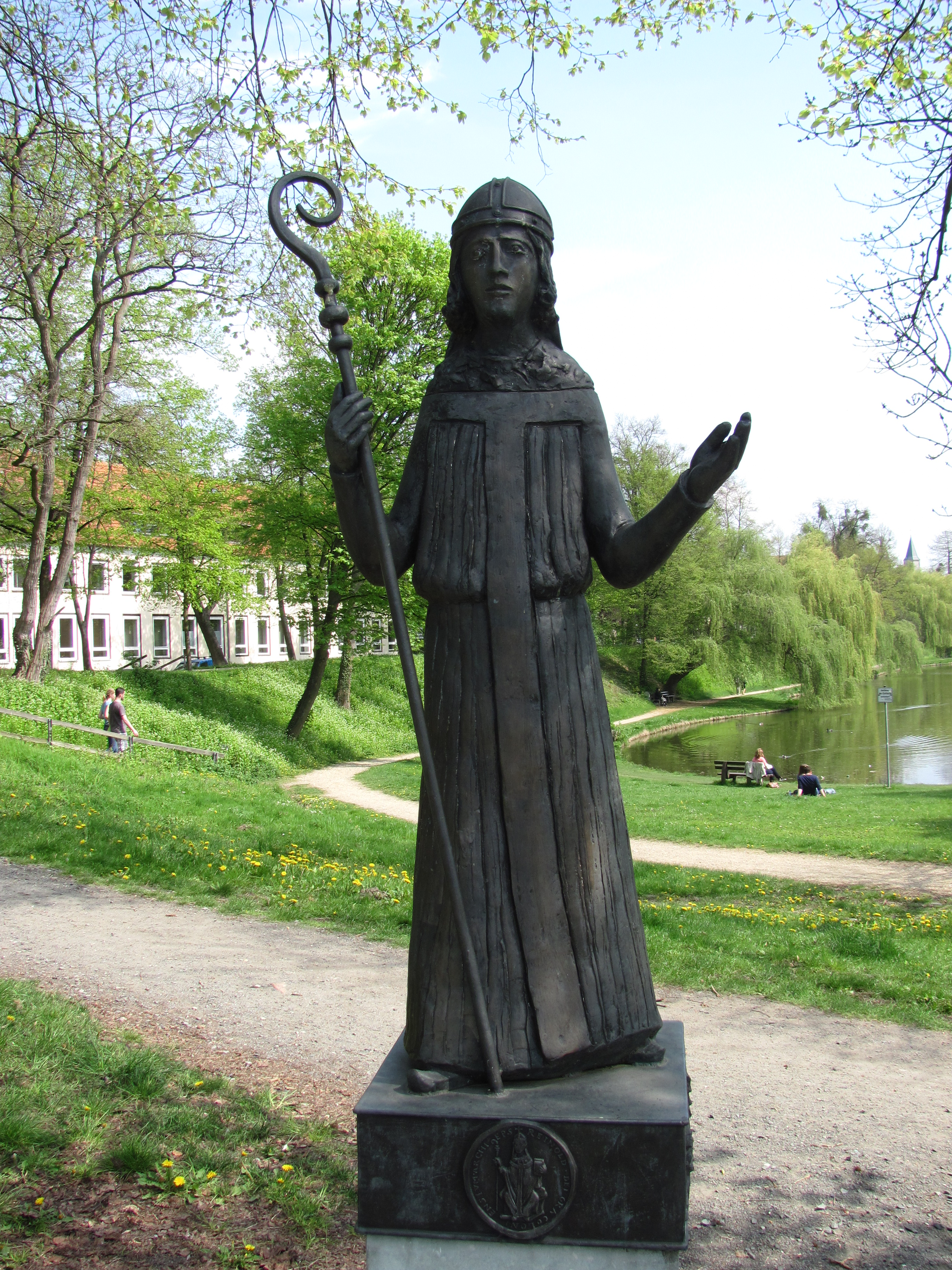
Modern statue of Rainald von Dassel, Hildesheim

Rainald became one of the most important dignitaries in Hildesheim, where he had the first stone bridge built above the Innerste river. He represented the diocese at the 1148 Council of Reims, presided over by Pope Eugene III, openly opposing a canon concerned with clerical dress. Particular attention was paid to his statements by John of Salisbury, who mentioned him in his Historia Pontificalis. In 1153 Rainald received the provostship of the St Maurice monastery in Hildesheim and St Peter's Abbey in Goslar. Soon after, he was also appointed provost of the Münster Cathedral chapter (in 1154), of the Maastricht Basilica of Saint Servatius (1156), and of Xanten Cathedral. However, when a new Bishop of Hildesheim was elected in 1153, he declined the see.

=== Chancellor ===
Frederick Barbarossa, elected King of the Romans in 1152, soon noticed Rainald's talents. As a member of the legation sent to Pope Eugene III at Rome he first revealed his political ability. After Frederick had been crowned Holy Roman Emperor by Pope Adrian IV in 1155, he appointed Rainald his chancellor.

In the rising conflict between emperor and papacy, the Diet of Besançon in October 1157 left no doubt as to the drift of Rainald's policies. He issued a directive which insisted upon the rights and the power of the Emperor, especially in the Kingdom of Italy, the strengthening of the autonomous German Catholic clergy, and the reduction of the influence of the papacy. Full of life, at times rough and blunt and again careful and calculating, Rainald, who, in spite of his ecclesiastical dignities, knew how to wield the sword, henceforth influenced the policy of his Imperial master.

The struggle with the Curia escalated at the Diet of Besançon, where Rainald entered into a fierce controversy with the papal legate Roland of Siena (later Pope Alexander III), vigorously rejecting Pope Adrian's use of the word beneficium, which might mean fief as well as benefit. In the expression used, that the pope would have been glad to grant the emperor even greater beneficia (or benefits), it was thought that the old desire of the Curia for the mastery of the world was to be found.

Though Rainald did not wish to separate Germany entirely from Rome and still held the medieval respect for the Catholic Church, his temperament carried Barbarossa much further than the latter desired, or than was advantageous in the circumstances. When Frederick finally submitted, it was Rainald who prevented him from making concessions which might have proved of advantage. In 1158 he and Duke Otto I of Bavaria undertook a diplomatic journey into Italy to prepare the way for the emperor's campaign.

=== Archbishop ===
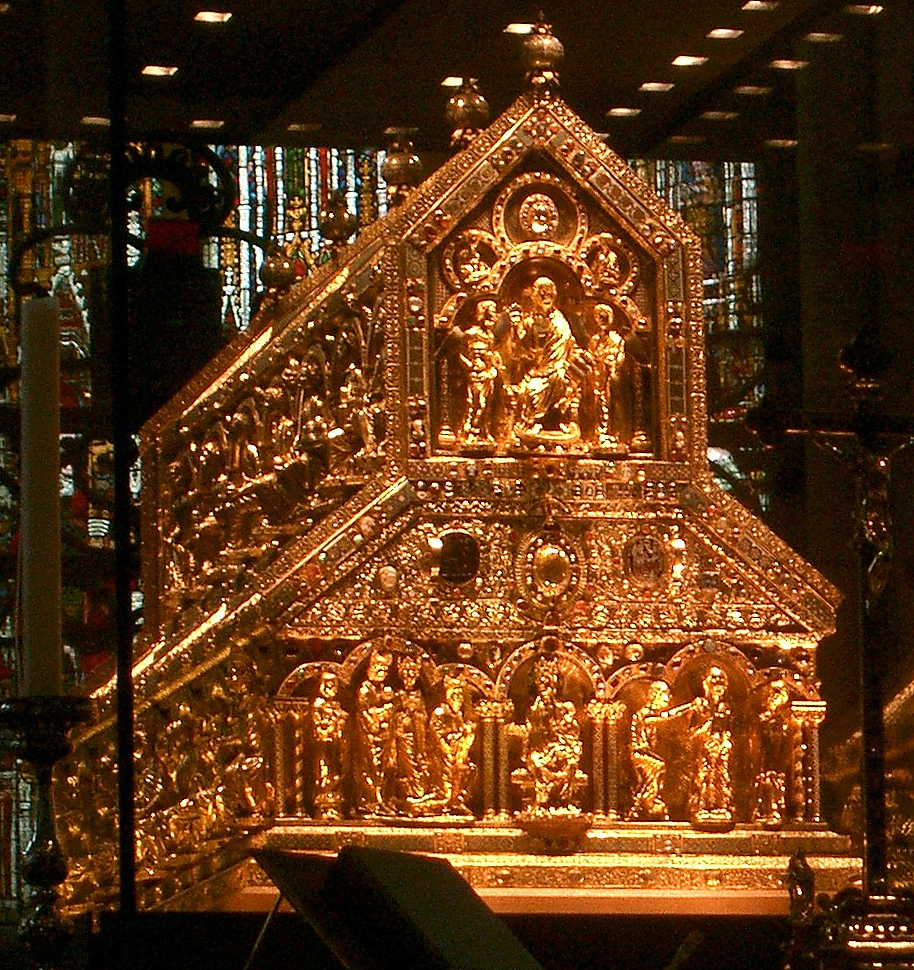
Shrine of the Three Magi

In January 1159 the imperial envoy Rainald entered the city of Milan, which had been peacefully conquered in 1158, however, he was expelled and almost murdered by the inhabitants. While still staying in an Imperial army camp, he was appointed Archbishop of Cologne and Archchancellor of Italy in absence, as successor of the late Frederick II of Berg. When Pope Adrian died in 1159, the double election of Pope Alexander III and Victor IV led to a schism, during which Rainald aimed at strengthening the Imperial antipope Victor. At the 1160 Council of Pavia, he served as the emperor's ambassador and was employed in diplomatic negotiations with Genoa, Pisa, as well as the courts of King Louis VII of France and King Henry II of England, whom he endeavoured to win to the side of the antipope but did not succeed.

In 1162 Emperor Barbarossa began a second siege of Milan, which would end with the destruction of the city. In 1163 Alexander III excommunicated Rainald, who had loudly proclaimed in these negotiations the right of the emperor to dispose of the papal see. Basing his action on the Roncalian decrees issued at the Diet of Roncaglia, near Piacenza, in 1158, Rainald was once more successfully employed in Italy in the affairs of the emperor. When Victor IV died, Rainald, of his own volition and without waiting for the consent of the emperor, elected at Lucca a new antipope, Paschal III. Frederick would hardly have continued the schism. Rainald knew this and therefore wished to force the emperor to continue the struggle for imperial supremacy.

Back in Germany in 1164, he brought the bones of the Three Magi with him to Cologne as loot from Milan and as a gift of Emperor Frederick Barbarossa; today they are still in the Cologne Cathedral. In the meantime the number of the adherents against the lawful pope increased in Germany. Rainald finally won the consent of the English king to common ecclesiastico-political action in behalf of Paschal III and once more took up arms in defence of his one ambition, which he hoped the proposed canonization of Charlemagne at Aachen in 1165 would advance. The new alliance was sealed by the engagement of King Henry's daughter Matilda with the Saxon duke Henry the Lion. In this period Rainald was notably the patron of the Archpoet.

In 1167 he was again in Italy, actively engaged in preparing the way for the emperor. Together with Archbishop Christian I of Mainz, and under Rainald's guidance an army won a victory over a much larger force of Roman troops at the Battle of Monte Porzio on 29 May 1167 and laid siege to the city. His death soon after was likely of malaria; his mortal remains were transferred to Cologne and buried in the Lady Chapel of the Cathedral.

Rainald von Dassel House of Dassel Born: ca. 1120 Died: 14 August 1167
Catholic Church titles
Preceded by Frederick II	Archbishop of Cologne; 1159–1167	Succeeded by Philip I
