= Rüdiger Butte =

German detective and politician

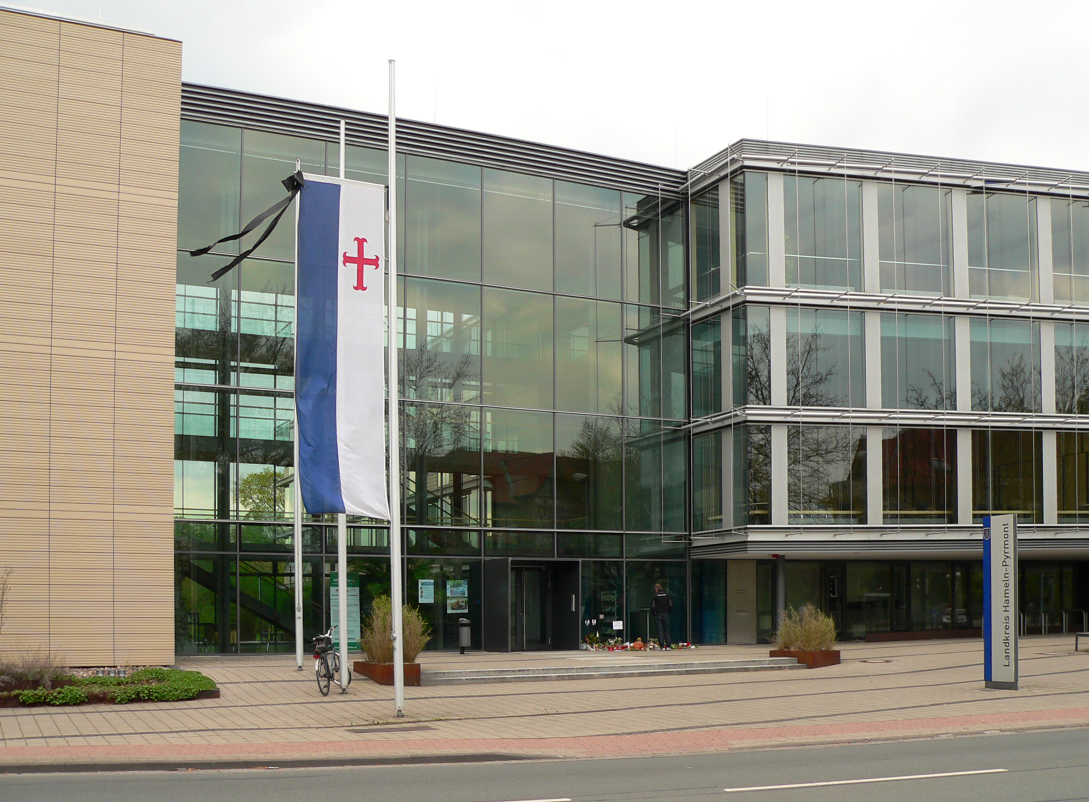
The district building

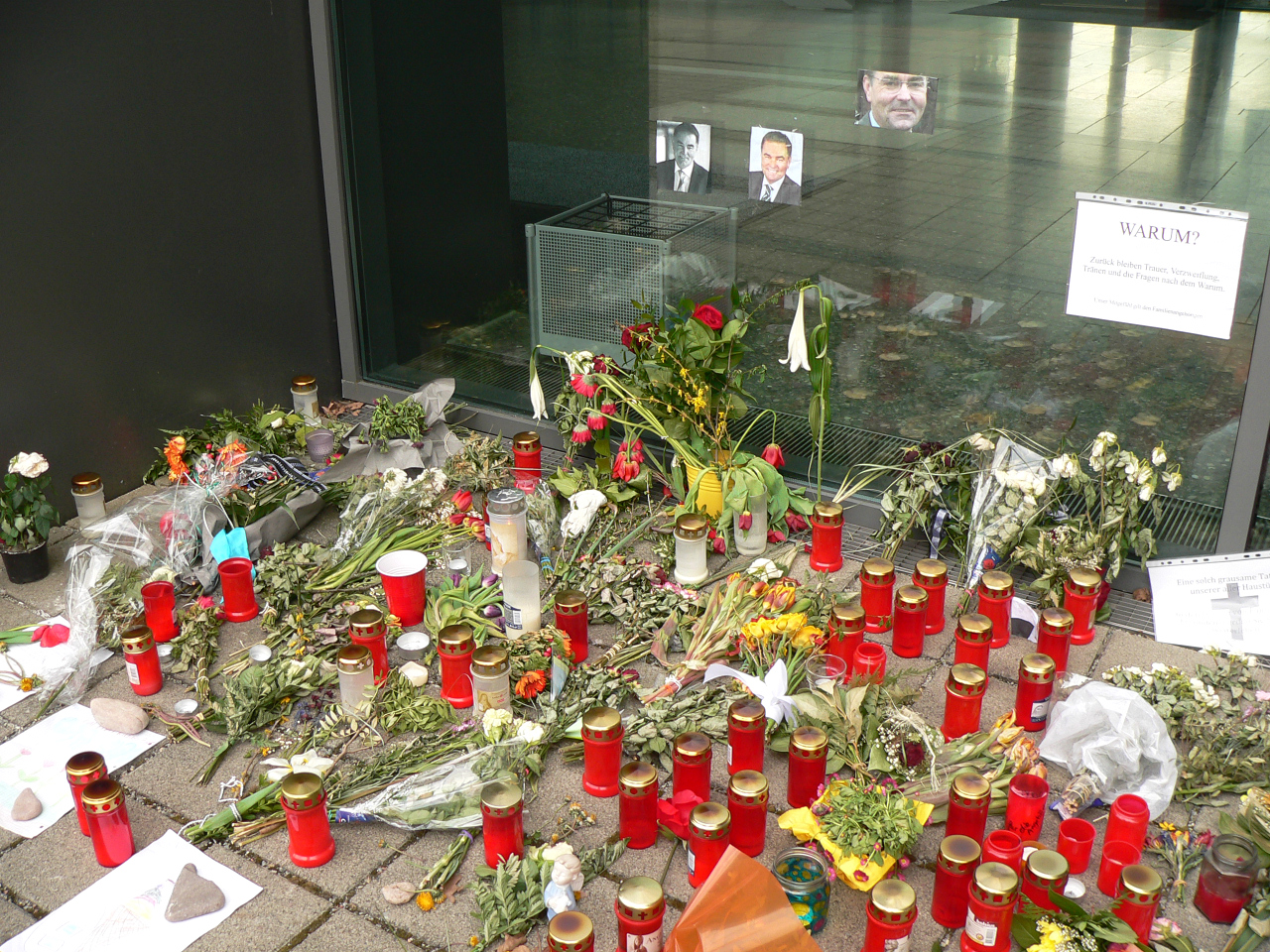
Condolences in front of the district building

Rüdiger Butte (17 May 1949, Lüthorst, Germany – 26 April 2013, Hamelin) was a German detective and politician (SPD) who was director of the State Office of Criminal Investigation of Lower Saxony and councillor of the district of Hamelin-Pyrmont from August 2005.

== Career ==
Born on May 17, 1949 in Lüthorst, in the former district of Einbeck, he started his career in 1974 as a detective in Lower Saxony. His training as a police commissioner took him through Braunschweig, Huntlosen (Großenkneten), Göttingen, and finally Hann Münden. After a short period as Kriminalkommissar (detective inspector) in Bückeburg he was promoted by the Ministry of the Interior to become a case worker of the Kriminalpolizei in 1985. The Kriminalpolizei is the criminal investigation agency within the German police forces. Working here, he primarily focused on the fight against organised crime. He was the Director of the Holzminden Polizeiinspektion (term used in Lower Saxony for police station) for almost a year after a reformation of the Lower Saxony police in 1994, to which he contributed in various topics. From 1995 to 1999, he acted as the representative of the director of the police department for the Hanover Regierungsbezirk (governmental district). On 18 April 2001 he became director of the Landeskriminalamt of Lower Saxony. He held this office until July 2005. He was a councillor in the Hamelin-Pyrmont district from August of that year until his death.

== Death ==
On 26 April 2013, Butte was shot in front of the district building, by a 74-year-old man. The man came from the same district as Butte and later committed suicide. He had a background of disputes with authorities. Butte was married and had two children and 5 grandchildren. A non-profit educational institution associated with the Social Democratic Community for Local Politics in Lower Saxony (Sozialdemokratische Gemeinschaft für Kommunalpolitik Niedersachsen e.V.) was founded in November 2021, in honor of him.
