= Hans-Georg Stephan =

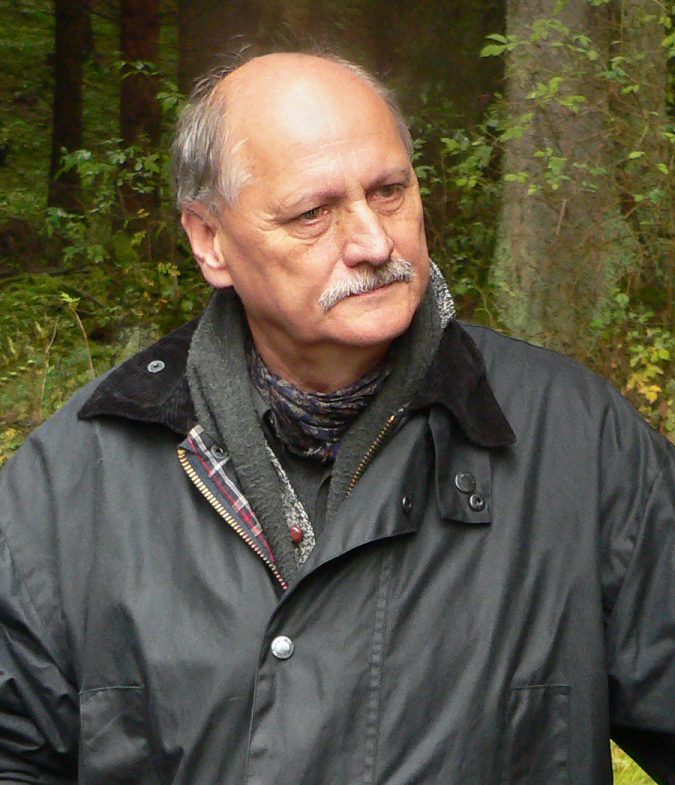
- Born: 30 May 1950 (age 76)

Academic work
- Discipline: medieval archaeology; post-medieval archaeology

Hans-Georg Stephan (born 30 May 1950) is a German university professor specializing in European medieval archaeology and post-medieval archaeology.

== Biography ==
Stephan was born in Beverungen in the German state of North Rhine-Westphalia. He studied archaeology, European ethnology (Volkskunde), and historical ancillary sciences at the University of Münster, LMU Munich and Cardiff University. After that, he worked at Kiel University and in Lübeck as city archaeologist until 1977. From then until 2004, he worked at the University of Göttingen's Department of Prehistory and Early History (i.e., archaeology). He completed his habilitation in 1992. In 2004, he was appointed professor of medieval and post-medieval archaeology at the Institute for Prehistoric Archaeology at Martin Luther University Halle-Wittenberg.

Stephan is married and has two children.

== Research specialization ==
Stephan's areas of specialization include interdisciplinary archaeological research in the first and second millennia AD, medieval settlement and landscape archaeology, urban topography and architectural history, renaissance material culture (especially ceramics, glass, and oven tiles), economic history (especially pottery, metallurgy and glass production), and archaeometry.

He and his research team discovered an abandoned village, near Nienover castle in 1992. The land was untouched since medieval times, the town never rebuilt, presenting an excellent site for archaeological exploration. Excavation work began in 1996. Stephan is the lead archaeologist into long-term research into the settlement, which was founded ca. 1200. The project is the most extensive research project of an abandoned village in Europe.

Excavation work took place with groups of other archaeologists, assistants and students, many from other countries, totaling hundreds of researchers over the years. Excavation work in the village of Schmeeson took place between 2004 and 2007. Initially, Stephan and his team thought they had found a small, squarish building, but in 2004, the site was covered by brush, later cleared away by the local historical society, which supports the project. This enabled Stephan to see that he had been standing on much more.

Stephan is working on a book about his research in the Solling.

== Excavation halted ==
The German state of Lower Saxony purchased the castle at Nienover in 2005, later selling it to Mireille van Meer, a Dutch horse breeder. Stephan, who spent twelve years researching and excavating the site, criticized Hartmut Möllring (CDU), state finance minister, for selling the castle at a "fire sale price" without bothering to secure the rights to continue the scientific work to its conclusion. This caused the demise of what Stephan called "a unique opportunity in Germany" to excavate an untouched medieval site. The new owner prohibited excavation of a well 40 meters (130 ft) deep, despite private funding, including that of Lower Saxony's former Minister of Science and Culture, Thomas Oppermann. A large part of the site's approximately 150 houses cannot be further researched.

== Selected publications ==
- Archäologische Beiträge zur Frühgeschichte der Stadt Höxter. Münstersche Beiträge zur Vor- und Frühgeschichte 7, 1973.
- Archäologische Studien zur Wüstungsforschung im südlichen Weserbergland. Münstersche Beiträge zur Ur- und Frühgeschichte 10-11, 1978-79.
- Coppengrave - Studien zur Töpferei des 13. -19. Jahrhundert in Nordwestdeutschland. Materialhefte zur Ur- und Frühgeschichte Niedersachsens 17, 1981.
- "The Development and Production of Medieval Stoneware in Germany. In: P. Davey, R. Hodges (eds.), Ceramics and Trade: The Production and Distribution of Later Medieval Pottery in North-West Europe, 1983, 95-120.
- Großalmerode. Ein entrum der Herstellung von technischer Keramik, Steinzeug und Irdenware in Hessen. Die Geschichte der keramischen Gewerbe in Großalmerode und die Entwicklung ihrer Produktion vom 12 bis zum 19. Jahrhundert. Teil I, 1986.
- Die bemalte Irdenware der Renaissance in Mitteleuropa. Ausstrahlungen und Verbindungen der Produktionszentren im gesamteuropäischen Rahmen. Forschungshefte des Bayerischen Nationalmuseums München 12, 1987.
- "Urban Archaeological Research in Germany: A Regional Review of Medieval Topographic Development," in: D. Denecke, G. Shaw (eds.), Urban Historical Geography. Recent Progress in Britain and Germany. - Cambridge Studies in Historical Geography 10, 1988 (c), 53-68, 347-354.
- Kacheln aus dem Werraland. Die Entwicklung der Ofenkacheln vom 13. bis zum 17. Jahrhundert im unteren Werraraum. Schriften des Werratalvereins Witzenhausen 23, 1991.
- Keramik der Renaissance im Oberweserraum und an der unteren Werra. Beiträge der Archäologie zur Erforschung der Sachkultur der frühen Neuzeit. Zeitschrift für Archäologie des Mittelalters, Beiheft 7, 1992.
- Großalmerode. Ein europäisches Zentrum der Herstellung von technischer Keramik. Die Geschichte der keramischen Gewerbe in Großalmerode und Epterode und die Entwicklung ihrer Produktion vom 12. bis zum 19. Jahrhundert. Teil II: Technische und Baukeramik, Tonpfeifen, Knicker, Steingut. Porzellan, Aspekte von Handel, früher chemischer Industrie, Bergbau und Gewerbegeschichte, 1995.
- C. Zientek, H. Urban, H. J. Bollingberg, A. König, and H.-G. Stephan, "Analytical Results of Copper Alloys from Medieval Saxonian Artifacts," In S. Demirci, A. M. Özer, and G. D. Summers (eds.), The Proceedings of the 29th International Symposium on rchaeometry, Ankara 1996, 53-57.
- Studien zur Siedlungsentwicklung und -struktur von Stadt und Kloster Corvey (800-1670). Eine Synopse auf der Grundlage der archäologischen Quellen. Göttinger Schriften zur Ur- und Frühgeschichte 26, Bd. 1-3, 2000.
- M. Koch, J. Lepper, U. Siewers, and H.-G. Stephan "Iron Ore Occurrences in the Mesozoic Uplands of Southern Lower Saxony and Northern Hesse (Germany and Their Geochemical Characterization for an Archaeometallurgical Project," Archaeometallurgy in Europe. International Conference. 14.25.26 September 2003 Milan, Italy Proceedings" vol. 2, 507-513.
