= Szanticska =

Coordinates: 48°24′N 20°59′E

- Village
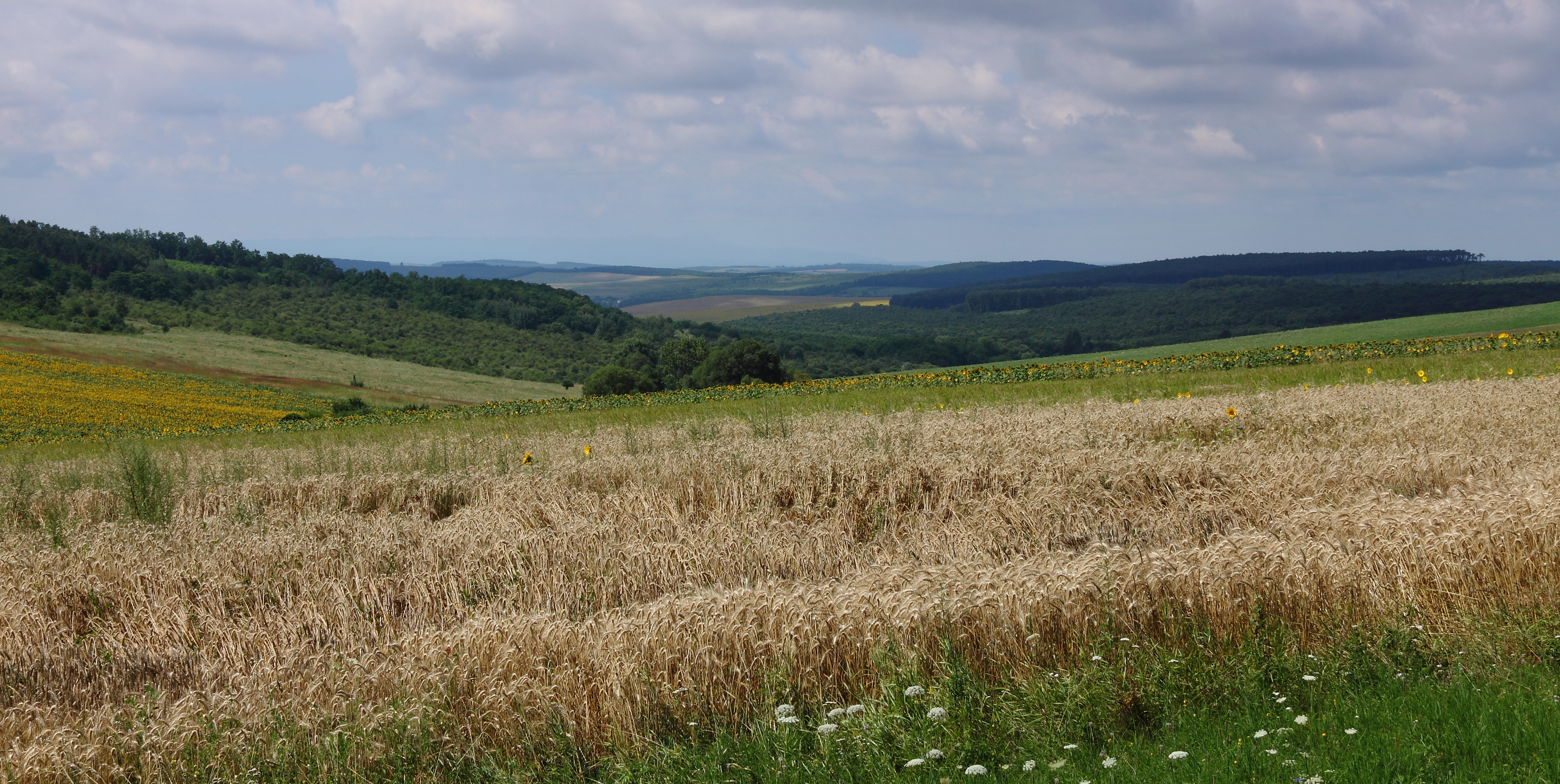
- View of Cserehát Hills at Abaújlak, Szanticska, Hungary

- Location within Hungary
- Country: Hungary
- County: Borsod-Abaúj-Zemplén County
- District: Szikszó District
- County: Borsod-Abaúj-Zemplén County
- Named for: Stephen I of Hungary

Population (2025)
  - Total: 3

Szanticska is a former village in Borsod-Abaúj-Zemplén County, Hungary. With a population of 3 people in 2025 Szanticska is famous for being regarded the smallest settlement in Hungary, although officially it is not an independent municipality but part of the village Abaújlak since 1870. In fact, mentioning it as "smallest settlement in Hungary" has neither official nor statistical basis rather it is a kind of urban legend born in the 1980s.

== History ==
Szanticska was first mentioned in 1317. Its name comes from the name of St. Stephen (Szent István in Hungarian). During the Ottoman occupation of Hungary, the area was an important wine district, later it became deserted, but in the 18th century it was a populated place again. In 1870 it was annexed to Abaújlak.

Between the World Wars the village prospered, but the population started to decrease in the 1930s, mostly because the village didn't have a school. In 1988 the village had only one resident. During the 1990s Szanticska experienced a revival; some new residents settled down in the village. Now there is a fully equipped holiday resort which is very popular for yoga retreats and weddings. Szanticska also hosts Hungarian schoolchildren during the summer for weeklong camps.

There are 19 houses and 2 churches in the village.

== Other data ==
- Postal code: 3815
- Calling code: (+36) 46
