= County of Dassel =

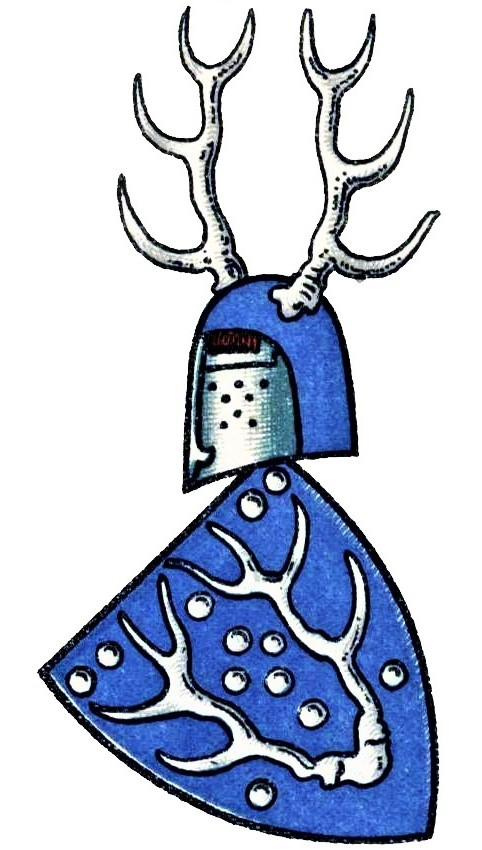
Coat of arms of the counts of Dassel

The County of Dassel (German: Grafschaft Dassel) emerged shortly after the turn of the 11th and 12th centuries when, after the extinction of the male line of the Billungs, its seat in Suilbergau, north of the Solling hills was divided into the domains of Einbeck and Dassel. Reinold of Dassel was able to secure rights similar to comital rights. The county lasted about 200 years, till it was abandoned in 1310 when there were no heirs. The most prominent member of the comital family was Rainald of Dassel, chancellor to Emperor Frederick Barbarossa and Archbishop of Cologne.

== Chronology ==
The family strengthened its domain by building a castle at the family seat in Dassel.

At the beginning of the 13th century, there was a spirit of optimism all over the county, which allowed the economy and trade to flourish. The height of the county's prosperity was in the mid-13th century. The county was broken up by sales of property around the end of the 13th century. It disappeared finally in the early 14th century, with the absence of male descendants.

== Territorial growth and decline ==
At the beginning of the 12th century, the county covered the forested region of the Upper Weser (roughly the area of the present-day Solling-Vogler Nature Park) and its eastern foreland as far as the Leine valley.

It was subsequently divided into two parts due to a split in the family tree. The Adolfic line, with its seat at Hunnesrück castle in the northern part of the county, fell briefly to the county of Ratzeburg at the beginning of the 13th century, its domain thereby increasing considerably. The county of Ratzeburg was lost again very soon thereafter, however, as a consequence of its losing the Battle of Waschow.

The Ludolfic line flourished in the south, around Nienover, and benefited after 1180 initially from the fall of Henry the Lion. In the middle of the 13th century the territory was expanded to the south, but this gain was only temporary. The counts of Dassel had not only to hold their own against their neighbouring counties, but also against the duchy of Brunswick-Lüneburg as well as the bishoprics of Mainz, Paderborn and Hildesheim. Inheritance divisions saw the territorial fragmentation of the county of Dassel but its eventual demise was caused by a lack of heirs.

The last count of Dassel, Simon, from the Adolfic line, gradually sold all the remaining land around his family seat and thereby dissolved the county.

As well as their immediate domination over the region around their family seats, where they had comprehensive rights secured by military force, from time to time, the counts of Dassel also had numerous other rights that extended their influence to other areas. To the south these included the Reinhardswald in a coarse triangle between the Weser, Fulda confluence and Diemel; to the north along the Leine, as well as other places scattered along the Elbe and Ruhr. But the power of the counts was limited here either by their geographic remoteness or the reduction of rights to a single aspect of social life or by having to share rights with other counts.

=== Neighbouring territories ===
- Lords (Edelherren) of Homburg: this territory bordered the county of Dassel immediately to the north and included Lüthorst.
- County of Schwalenberg: this large county lay west of the Weser, northwest of the county of Dassel.
- Counts of Everstein: Everstein castle lay to the north, between the domain of Homburg and county of Schwalenberg.
- Lords of Brakel: they owned a small territory west of the Upper Weser.
- Welf hereditary lands: they bordered the county east of the Leine.
- Hesse: to the south the counts of Frankish Hessengau and their successors, the Landgraves of Hesse, were the most important neighbours.

=== Boundaries ===
For over 150 years, the Upper Weser river provided a natural western border and it is today the border between Lower Saxony and North Rhine-Westphalia. The village of Mackensen marked the northern border toward Everstein throughout the existence of the county of Dassel. Today, this section of Dassel marks the border between the districts of Northeim and Holzminden. To the east, lies the last border of the county of Dassel prior to its sale in 1310. Today, it is part of the city limits of Dassel. This is an example of the common problem during the Middle Ages of retaining property that was spread out. The counts of Dassel were not able to extend themselves eastward, thus in 1310, only Markoldendorf was fully theirs. Nonetheless, Simon of Dassel was able to retain several oxgangs, as well as iron processing rights on his privately owned property, all now a section of present-day Dassel.

The border today between the districts of Northeim and Kassel give a rough idea of the southern county border, which was less stable. One of the counts of Dassel's last displays of power in the mid-13th century took place much further south of the border, in an arc formed by Körbecke, Grebenstein, and Reinhardshagen. This display shows how weak the counts were at the end. The modest remainder of their territory in 1310 was marked in the south by Dassel's villages, Relliehausen (then known as Reylinghehusen) and Hilwartshausen, which still form the southern edge of the city of Dassel.

== Coat of arms ==
The coat of arms of the counts of Dassel, established in 1210, features an eight-tine deer antler and was adopted by the city of Dassel in 1646. Today, there are 12 small balls in the space around the antler; earlier, the number varied. All the important elements of the counts' coat of arms are today also on the coat of arms of Lauenberg, a section of Dassel. Although Lauenberg wasn't founded until the second half of the 14th century, after the demise of the county of Dassel, the town was established just below the counts' hunting castle, called Lauenburg (Lauen castle).

The counts' eight-tine deer antler is also present in the coat of arms of Nienover, a rural housing estate in Bodenfelde. At one time, the Ludolfic line had its primary seat here. At the time of the county of Dassel, Bodenfelde was the southwestern boundary on the Upper Weser and the counts set up a customs post there. Nienover was sold in 1270, along with the village of Wahmbeck. Bodenfelde's coat of arms today retains elements of the counts' shield.

The extension of the county of Dassel southward during the Ludolfic period is visible today in the Schönhagen coat of arms, as well. The eight-tine antler of the counts of Dassel are depicted on a deer's skull. Between the branches of the antler, there are six balls forming a cross and two additional balls on either side of the skull.

== Economy ==
Trade flourished under the counts' rule, but after the fall of Nienover, trade in the county collapsed. Without Nienover, the better route traveling east and west proved to be through Bodenwerder or the Hellweg bridge in Corvey, while the north-south trade route moved through Einbeck along the Leine. Nonetheless, the trades and agriculture was sufficient to sustain continual economic development of the region in the centuries following.

Around 1210, the counts of Dassel began circulating their own coins, which were minted with their coat of arms. By 1250, however, they had to stop because the production costs were greater than the value of bracteates.

== Biographies and history ==
The house of Dassel was certified in 1113 as edelfrei, i.e. knights not subordinate to any except the king or emperor. However, they first became known by their family seat, Dassel, in 1126. Dassel is today part of the district of Northeim, in Lower Saxony.

=== Reinold I of Dassel ===
The first attested member of the house was Reinold I, whose presence in Suilbergau is documented from 1097 to 1127. After Suilbergau was divided in 1113, he acquired the grafschaft (county) in the Dassel area. His domain eventually extended to the upper Weser and Diemel, to the Reinhardswald, and toward Thuringia, the result of diverse connections from service, fief and family.

He is first mentioned as a noble, "von Dassel" ("of Dassel"), in 1126. His parents were Dietrich and Kunhild. Of his children, three are known by name, Ludolf, Rainald and Gepa. His wealth allowed him to provide his son Rainald with a comprehensive education at the prestigious bishopric of Hildesheim. In addition, between 1113 and 1118, he made several gifts to Corvey Abbey.

=== Ludolf I of Dassel ===
Reinold's eldest son, Ludolf I, managed the family seat in Dassel as an inheritance. He died of dysentery in 1167 outside Rome in the military camp of Emperor Frederick Barbarossa. The County of Dassel was then split into two separate lines under his sons Ludolf II and Adolf I.

=== Rainald of Dassel ===
Rainald, Reinold's second son, is the best-known member of the noble house. He was chancellor under Emperor Frederick Barbarossa and Archbishop of Cologne. In 1164, he had the bones of the Magi transported to Cologne, whereupon their reverence in the Christian world increased and Cologne became an important place of pilgrimage. Rainald of Dassel also died of dysentery in 1167 near Rome.

=== Gepa of Dassel ===
Gepa of Dassel was abbess of the Ursuline monastery in Cologne.

=== Sophie of Dassel ===
Sophie, daughter of Ludolf I, married Bernhard II of Wölpe at the end of the 12th century and then lived in the Middle Weser region. Her daughter, Richenza, who married Heinrich I of Hoya, was also married here.

=== Ludolf II of Dassel ===
Ludolf II (d. between 1197 and 1210) was the oldest son of Ludolf I. During his reign, the house of Dassel was invested with Nienover castle and its rights, as well as the adjacent land in Solling. Ludolf made Nienover his family seat, while his brother lived at Hunnesrück castle. Both brothers were, like most Saxon nobles, decided opponents of Henry the Lion and gained substantially in both property and rights when Henry was stripped of his lands in 1180, allowing them uninterrupted expansion of their authority and control in southern parts of Lower Saxony. Ludolf took part in the Third Crusade in 1189.

Of Ludolf's children, the following are known by name:

- Adolf II of Dassel
- Ludolf III of Dassel, married Benedicta
- Reinold III, Domherr in Hildesheim
- Sigebodo (b. before 1210, d. 1251), Domherr in Verden
- Adelheid (d. 1238), married in 1220 to Berthold of Schöneberg (1188–1223)

=== Adolf II of Dassel and Nienover ===
Adolf II of Dassel (reigned 1210 to 1257) and his brother Ludolf III (reigned 1209-10 to 1219-20) were given Schöneberg as a fiefdom by the electorate of Mainz. In 1244, Adolf was also given Gieselwerder as a fiefdom by the electorate of Mainz and made its burgmann.

=== Adelheid of Dassel ===
Adelheid, the daughter of Ludolf II, was married to the Count of Schöneberg. Her dowry contained the rights to several localities, splitting this territory from the ancestral seat southward. The county of Dassel then lost this territory, Hümme, Ostheim and Gut Dinkelburg near Körbecke. With marriage, this property all transferred to her husband.

== Sources ==
- Hubertus Zummach, Ruina Mundi! Rainald von Dassel, des Heiligen Römischen Reiches Erz- und Reichskanzler, Verlag Jörg Mitzkat, Holzminden 2007, ISBN 978-3-940751-00-3
- Friedhelm Biermann, Weserraum im hohen und späten Mittelalter. 2007, ISBN 3-89534-649-7.
- Nathalie Kruppa, Die Grafen von Dassel 1097–1337/38. Familie, Besitz und Regesten. (Veröffentlichungen des Instituts für Historische Landesforschung der Universität Göttingen 42). Verlag für Regionalgeschichte, Bielefeld 2002, ISBN 3-89534-392-7. Zugleich Dissertation Universität Göttingen, 2000.
- Johannes Schildhauer, Die Grafen von Dassel: Herkunft und Genealogie. (Einbecker Geschichtsverein e.V., Studien zur Einbecker Geschichte, Bd. 3), Verlag Isensee, Oldenburg, 1966.
- Nathalie Kruppa, Neue Gedanken zum Quedlinburger Wappenkästchen, Concilium medii aevi 4, 2001, 153 - 177.
- Hans Mirus, Chronik der Stadt Dassel, von der Grafschaft bis zur Gebietsreform 1974, Verlag August Lax, Hildesheim 1981
