= Dzernavichy =

Dzernavichy Дзёрнавічы (Belarusian) Дёрновичи (Russian) Dernovichi
- Location within Belarus
- Coordinates: 51°36′20″N 29°43′58″E
- Country: Belarus
- Region: Gomel Region
- District: Narowlya District
- Founded: 18th century

Population
  - Total: 0
- Time zone: UTC+3 (MSK)
- Area code: +375 2355
- License plate: 3

Dzernavichy or Dernovichi (Belarusian: Дзёрнавічы, romanized: Dzyornavichy; Russian: Дёрновичи, romanized: Dyornovichi) is an abandoned village in Narowlya District, Gomel Region, Belarus.

== History ==
Founded in the 18th century, in 1939 it annexed the farm Krasilovka (Russian: Красиловка). In 1943, during World War II, it was interested by the underground activities of Soviet partisans and was partially burned and ransacked by the Waffen-SS, that established a stronghold there. It was liberated on November 30, after a battle.

In 1959 it had a population of 1,016, with 308 families. Following the 1986 nuclear disaster of Chernobyl, it was abandoned and, from 1988, included in the Polesie State Radioecological Reserve; a Belarusian nature reserve that adjoins the Chernobyl Exclusion Zone in Ukraine.

== Geography ==
The village is located by the western shore of the Pripyat River, in front of Aravichy, between the cities of Pripyat, in Ukraine, and Narowlya.

== See also ==
- Ghost town
