= Bodenfelde =

- Municipality
- Coat of arms

- Location of Bodenfelde within Northeim district
- Interactive map of Bodenfelde
- Location within Germany Location within Lower Saxony
- Coordinates: 51°37′N 9°34′E
- Country: Germany
- State: Lower Saxony
- District: Northeim
- Subdivisions: 5 districts

Government
  - Mayor (2021–26): Nico Harenkamp

Area
  - Total: 19.77 km^{2} (7.63 sq mi)
- Elevation: 118 m (387 ft)

Population (2025-12-31)
  - Total: 2,913
  - Density: 147.3/km^{2} (381.6/sq mi)
- Time zone: UTC+01:00 (CET)
  - Summer (DST): UTC+02:00 (CEST)
- Postal codes: 37194
- Dialling codes: 05572
- Vehicle registration: NOM
- Website: www.bodenfelde.de

Bodenfelde (German pronunciation: [boːdn̩ˈfɛldə]) is a municipality in the district of Northeim, in Lower Saxony, Germany. It is situated on the right bank of the Weser, approx. 35 km north of Kassel, and 30 km northwest of Göttingen at the southwest border of the Solling-Vogler Nature Park.

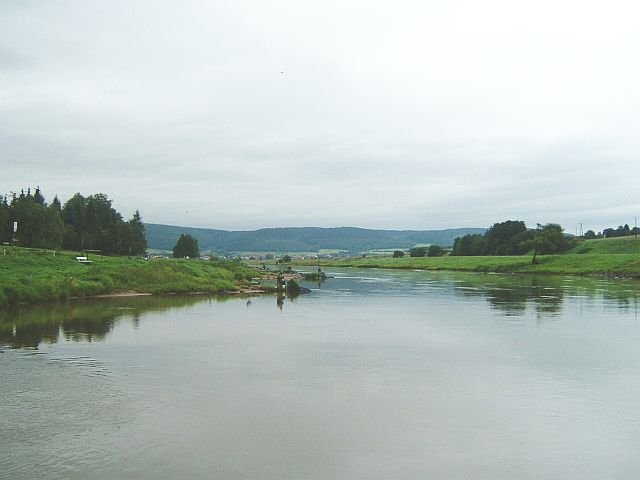
The Weser-river near Bodenfelde, the town is in the background

== History ==
Bodenfelde was first mentioned in a document signed by Louis the Pious in 833. In the High Middle Ages Bodenfelde was a part of the county of Dassel. Amelith, Nienover, Polier and Wahmbeck are villages nearby Bodenfelde which were incorporated in 1974.

There used to be a Jewish community in Bodenfelde. With the impending oppression of the Nazi regime, they left. Having been sold to a farmer in 1937, the wooden synagogue from 1825 survived Kristallnacht when the owner defended it from vandals. In the early twenty-first century, the half-timbered building was dismantled and exactly re-constructed in nearby Göttingen, which had a Jewish community in need of a synagogue (the local one having been destroyed during Kristallnacht.

In 2008, serial killer Lydia L. a.k.a. the "Black Widow" was convicted and was sentenced to life imprisonment. From 1983 to 2000, Lydia L. insinuated herself into romantic or caretaker relationships with eight elderly men, and was convicted for the murders of the last four in order to get their money, either killing them herself or ordering their killings through her accomplice, Siegmund "Siggi" Sch., who received a 12 year sentence after the court judged him to be not completely culpable, as he had acted under the threat of death and was emotionally dependent on the main perpetrator.

== Notable people ==
- Otto Ernst Oppermann (1764-1851), physician and taxidermist
- Jakob Freudenthal (1839-1907), philosopher
- Gustav Henckell (1859-1942), entrepreneur
- Friedrich Wasmuth (1882-1967), Protestant pastor and head of the Birkenhof children's home in Hanover
- Albrecht Götz von Olenhusen (1935-2022), lawyer
