= Abandoned village =

Village that has been deserted

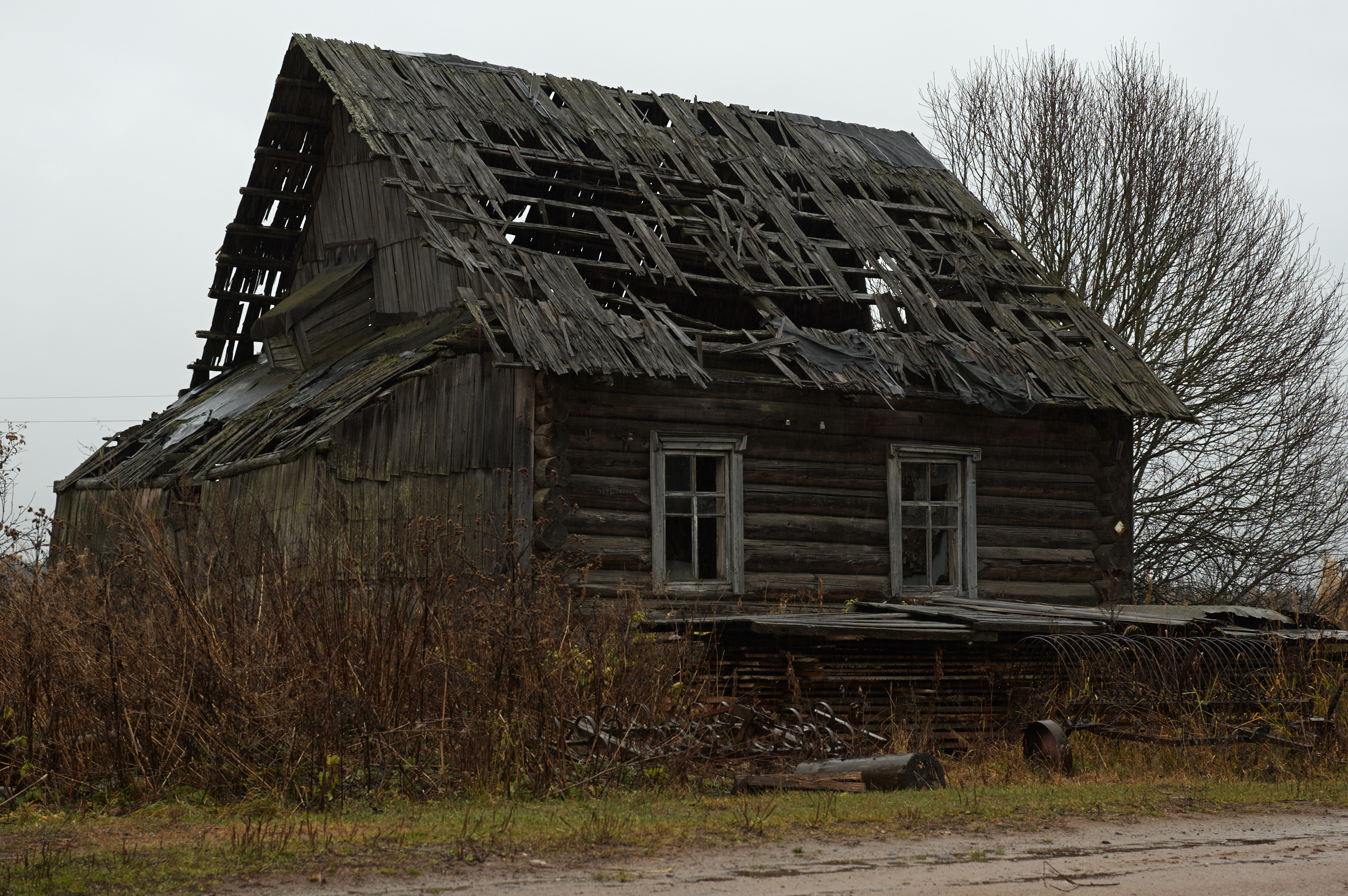
Abandoned village in Russia, 2005

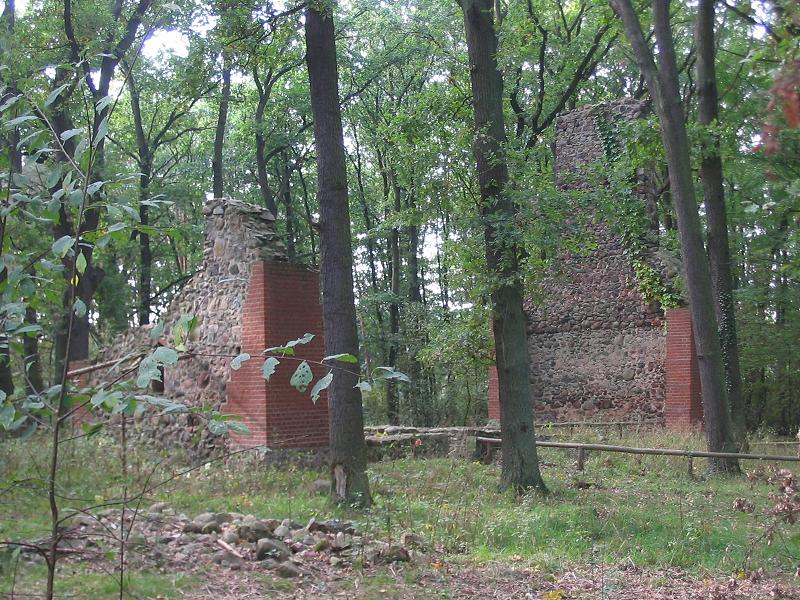
The remains of a fieldstone church in Dangelsdorf Germany, from the 14th century, taken in 2006

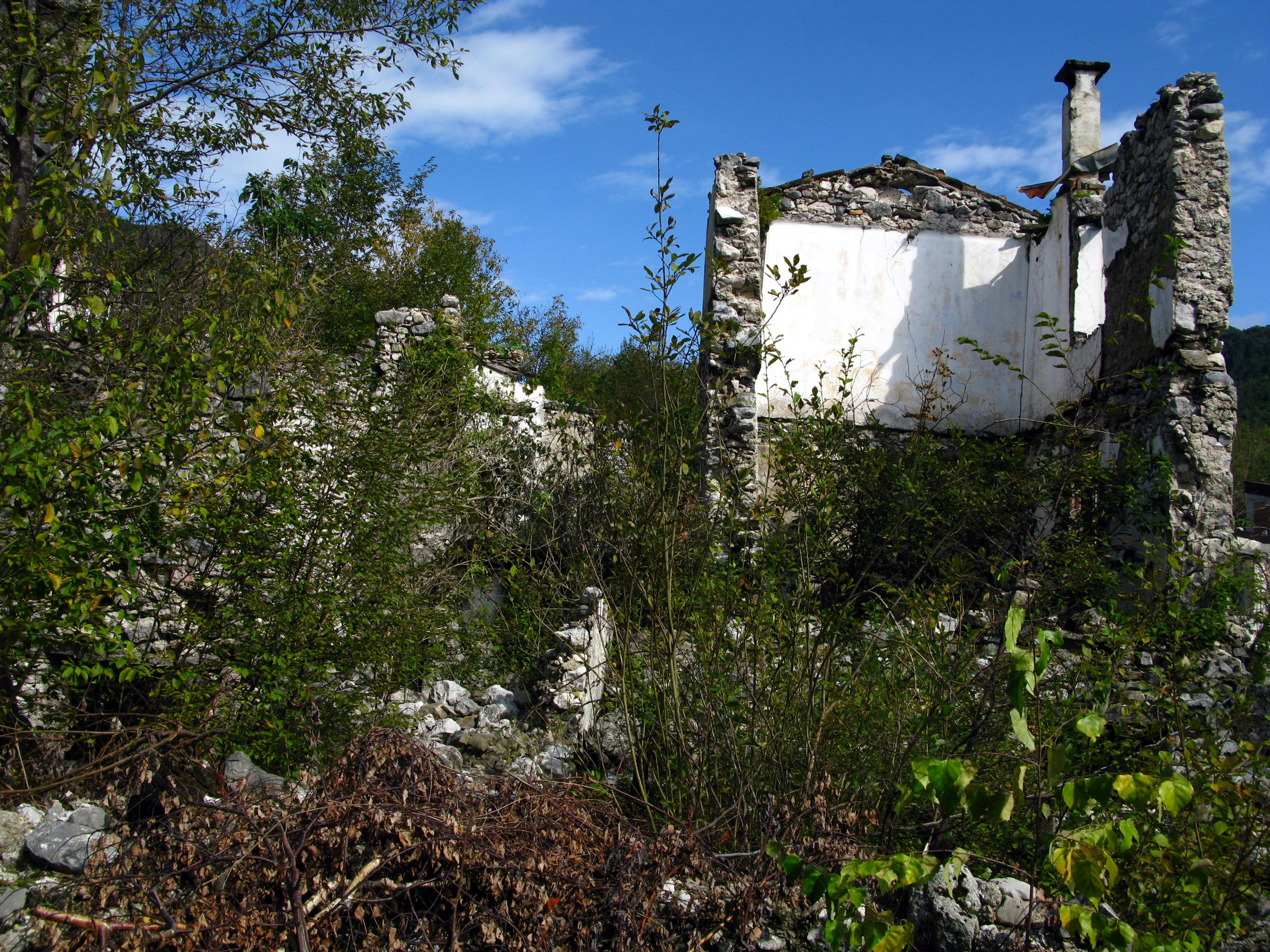
Moggessa di Qua near Moggio Udinese, Italy, in 2008

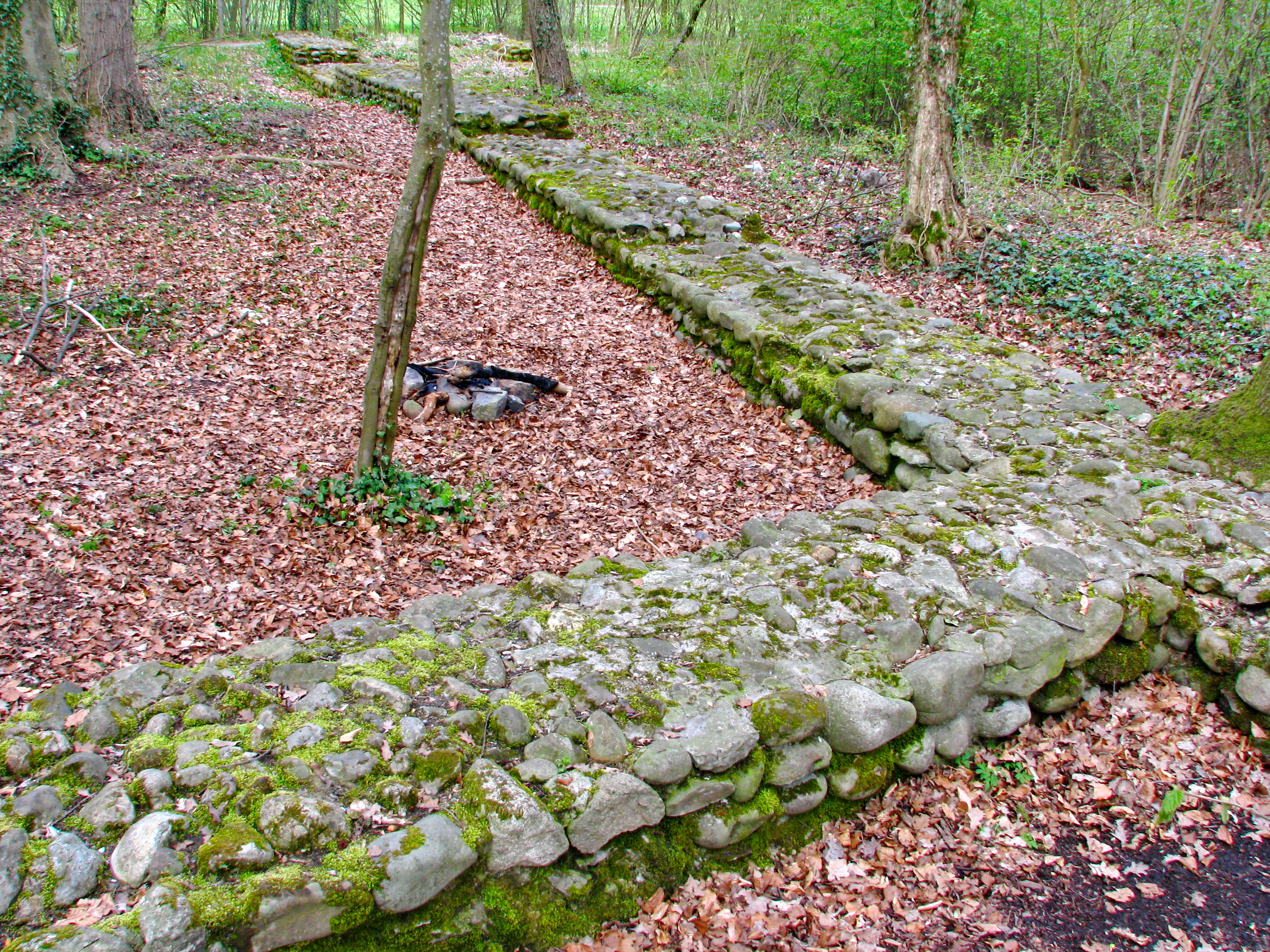
Glanzenberg, a 13th-century town in Unterengstringen, Switzerland, in 2010

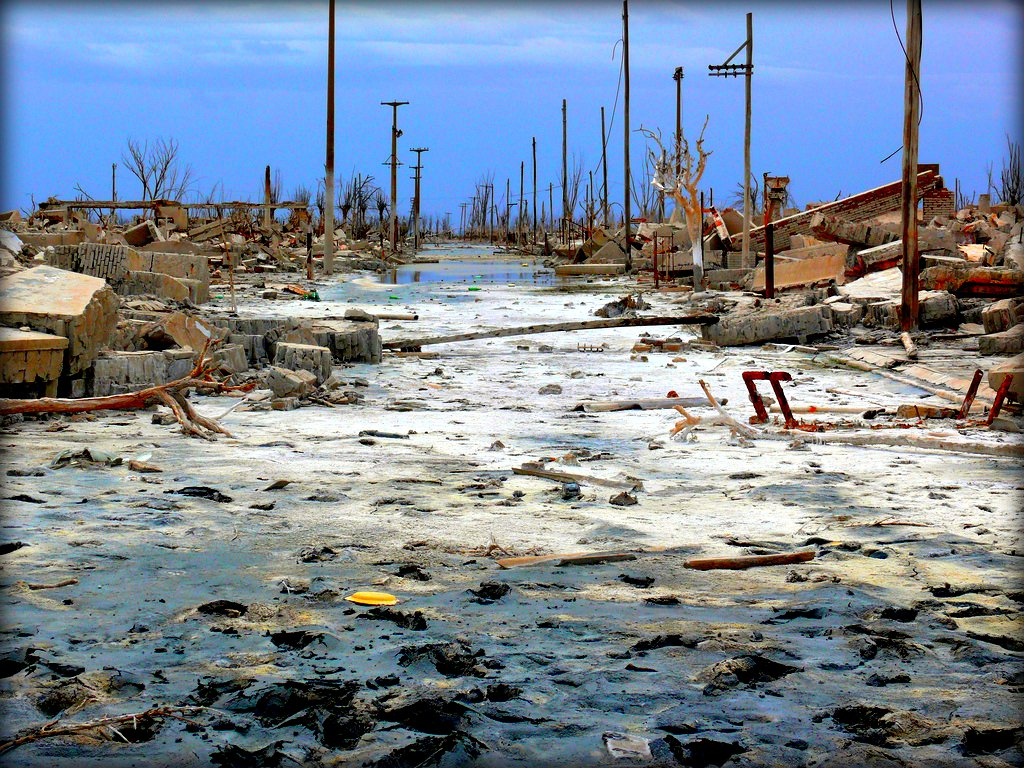
Villa Epecuén (Argentina) in 2010

An abandoned village is a village that has, for some reason, been deserted. In many countries, and throughout history, thousands of villages have been deserted for a variety of causes. Abandonment of villages is often related to epidemic, famine, war, climate change, economic depressions, environmental destruction, or deliberate clearances.

== Armenia and Azerbaijan ==
Hundreds of villages in Nagorno-Karabakh were deserted following the First Nagorno-Karabakh War. Between 1988 and 1993, 400,000 ethnic Azeris, and Kurds fled the area and nearly 200 villages in Armenia itself populated by Azeris and Kurds were abandoned by 1991. Likewise, nearly 300,000 Armenians fled from Azerbaijan between 1988 and 1993, including 50 villages populated by Armenians in Northern Nagorno Karabakh that were abandoned. Some of the Armenian settlements and churches outside Armenia and the Nagorno-Karabakh Republic have either been destroyed or damaged including those in Nakhichevan.

== Australia ==
In Australia, the government requires operators of mining towns to remove all traces of the town when it is abandoned. This has occurred in the cases of Mary Kathleen, Goldsworthy, and Shay Gap, but not in cases such as Wittenoom and Big Bell. Some towns have been lost or moved when dams are built. Others when the settlement was abandoned for any number of other reasons such as recurring natural disasters such as bushfires or changed circumstances. In Australia, an abandoned settlement that has infrastructure remaining is synonymous with ghost town.

== Belarus ==
In 1988, two years after the Chernobyl disaster, the Belarusian government created the Polesie State Radioecological Reserve, a 1,313 km^{2} (507 sq mi) exclusion zone to protect people against the effects of radiation. Twenty-two thousand people lived there in the 96 settlements that were abandoned, including Aravichy and Dzernavichy, and the area has since been expanded by a further 849 km^{2} (328 sq mi).

== Belgium ==
In 1968 in the Belgian region of Doel, a ban on building was implemented so that the Port of Antwerp could expand. Then an economic crisis occurred and this plan for expansion was halted. Then in 1998, another plan for the expansion of the Port of Antwerp was released and most of the inhabitants fled the town.

== China ==
Many villages in remote parts of the New Territories, Hong Kong, usually in valleys or on islands, have been abandoned due to inaccessibility. Residents go to live in urban areas with better job opportunities. Some villages have been moved to new sites to make way for reservoirs or new town development. See also walled villages of Hong Kong and list of villages in Hong Kong.

== Cyprus ==
Villages have been abandoned as a result of the Cyprus dispute. Some of these Cypriot villages are reported to be landmined.

== Finland ==
On the western edge of Vantaa's Ilola district, there is an illegal village called Simosenkylä, where the houses are mainly dilapidated, some completely abandoned.

== France ==
A number of villages, mainly in the north and north western areas of the country, were destroyed during World War I and World War II. A percentage of them were rebuilt next to the original sites, with the original villages remaining in a ruined state.

== Germany ==
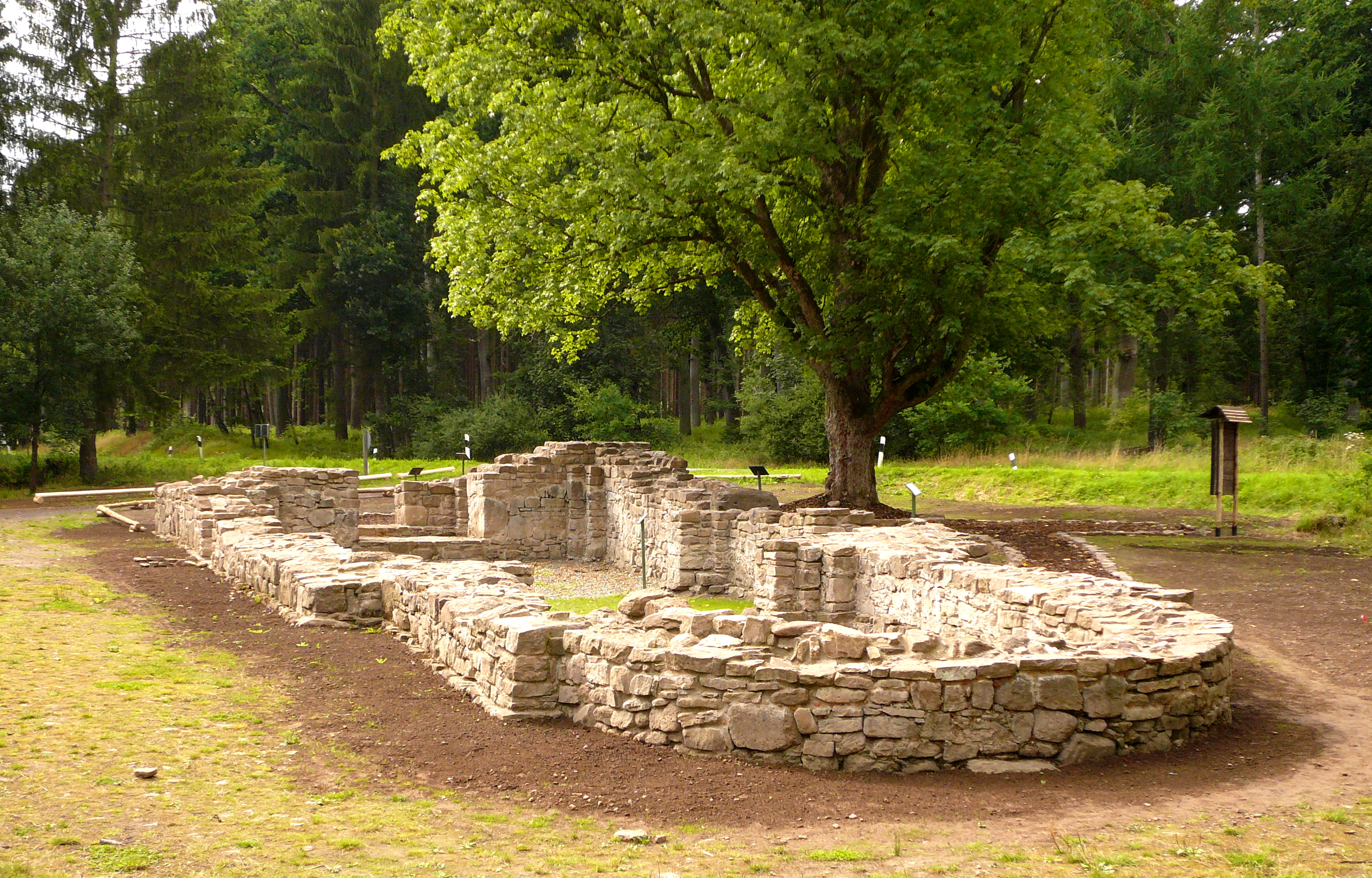
Winnefeld church ruin

There are hundreds of abandoned villages, known as Wüstungen, in Germany. Kurt Scharlau (a geographer) categorized the different types in the 1930s, making distinctions between temporary and permanent Wüstung, settlements used for different purposes (farms or villages), and the extent of abandonment (partial or total). His scheme has been expanded, and has been criticized for not taking into account expansion and regression. Archaeologists frequently differentiate between Flurwüstungen (farmed areas) and Ortswüstungen (sites where buildings formerly stood). The most drastic period of abandonment in modern times was during the 14th and 15th centuries—before 1350, there were about 170,000 settlements in Germany, and this had been reduced by nearly 40,000 by 1450. As in Britain, the Black Death played a large role in this, as did the growth of large villages and towns, the Little Ice Age, the introduction of crop rotation, and war (in Germany, particularly the Thirty Years' War). In later times, the German Empire demolished villages for the creation of training grounds for the military. As a result of the Potsdam conference the southern region of "east Prussia" became "Kaliningrad oblast" with the majority of villages permanently destroyed after the German population had been forced out. The same scenario applied to villages of ethnic Germans at the prewar borders of the now Czech Republic and Germany or Austria respectively as all ethnic Germans were expelled from the then Czechoslovakia.

== Hungary ==
Hundreds of villages were abandoned during the Ottoman wars in the Kingdom of Hungary in the 16th–17th centuries. Many of them were never repopulated, and they generally left few visible traces. Real ghost towns are rare in present-day Hungary, except the abandoned villages of Derenk (left in 1943) and Nagygéc (left in 1970). Due to the decrease in rural population beginning in the 1980s, dozens of villages are now threatened with abandonment. The first village officially declared as "died out" was Gyűrűfű at the end of the 1970s, but it was later repopulated as an "eco-village". Sometimes depopulated villages were successfully saved as small rural resorts like Kán, Tornakápolna, Szanticska, Gorica and Révfalu.

== India ==
One significant event of abandonment in Indian history was due to the Bengal famine of 1770. About ten million people, approximately one-third of the population of the affected area, are estimated to have died in the Bengal famine of 1770. Regions where the famine occurred included especially the modern Indian states of Bihar and West Bengal, but the famine also extended into Odisha and Jharkhand as well as modern Bangladesh. Among the worst affected areas were Birbhum and Murshidabad in Bengal, and Tirhut, Champaran and Bettiah in Bihar. As a result of the famine, these large areas were depopulated and returned to jungle for decades to come as the survivors migrated en masse in a search for food. Many cultivated lands were abandoned—much of Birbhum, for instance, returned to jungle and was virtually impassable for decades afterwards. From 1772 on, bands of bandits and thugs became an established feature of Bengal, and were only brought under control by punitive actions in the 1780s.

== Indonesia ==
Due to numerous natural disasters in Indonesia, many villages are destroyed, collapsed and abandoned, such as Petobo.

== Ireland ==
Multiple Irish villages have been abandoned during the Middle Ages or later: Oliver Goldsmith's poem "The Deserted Village" (1770) being a famous commentary on rural depopulation. Notable ghost villages include:

- Cannakill, County Offaly
- Clonmines, County Wexford
- Kilcornan, County Galway
- Port, County Donegal
- Rindoon, County Roscommon
- Scattery Island, County Clare
- Slievemore, Achill Island, County Mayo
- Tonaroasty, County Galway

Smaller rural settlements, known as clachans, were also fled by large numbers during the Great Famine (1845–1850).

In 1940, Ballinahown in West Wicklow, was evacuated for the construction of the Blessington Lakes and Poulaphouca Reservoir.

== Israel and Palestine ==
As a consequence of the 1948 Palestinian expulsion and flight during the 1948 Palestine war, around 720,000 Palestinian Arabs were displaced, leaving around 400 Palestinian Arab towns and villages depopulated in what became Israel. In addition, several Jewish communities in what became the West Bank and Gaza Strip were also depopulated.

In August 2005, Israel evacuated Gush Katif and all other Jewish settlements in the Gaza Strip. Some structures in these settlements, including greenhouses and synagogues, were left standing after the withdrawal, but were soon destroyed by Palestinians.

== Malta ==
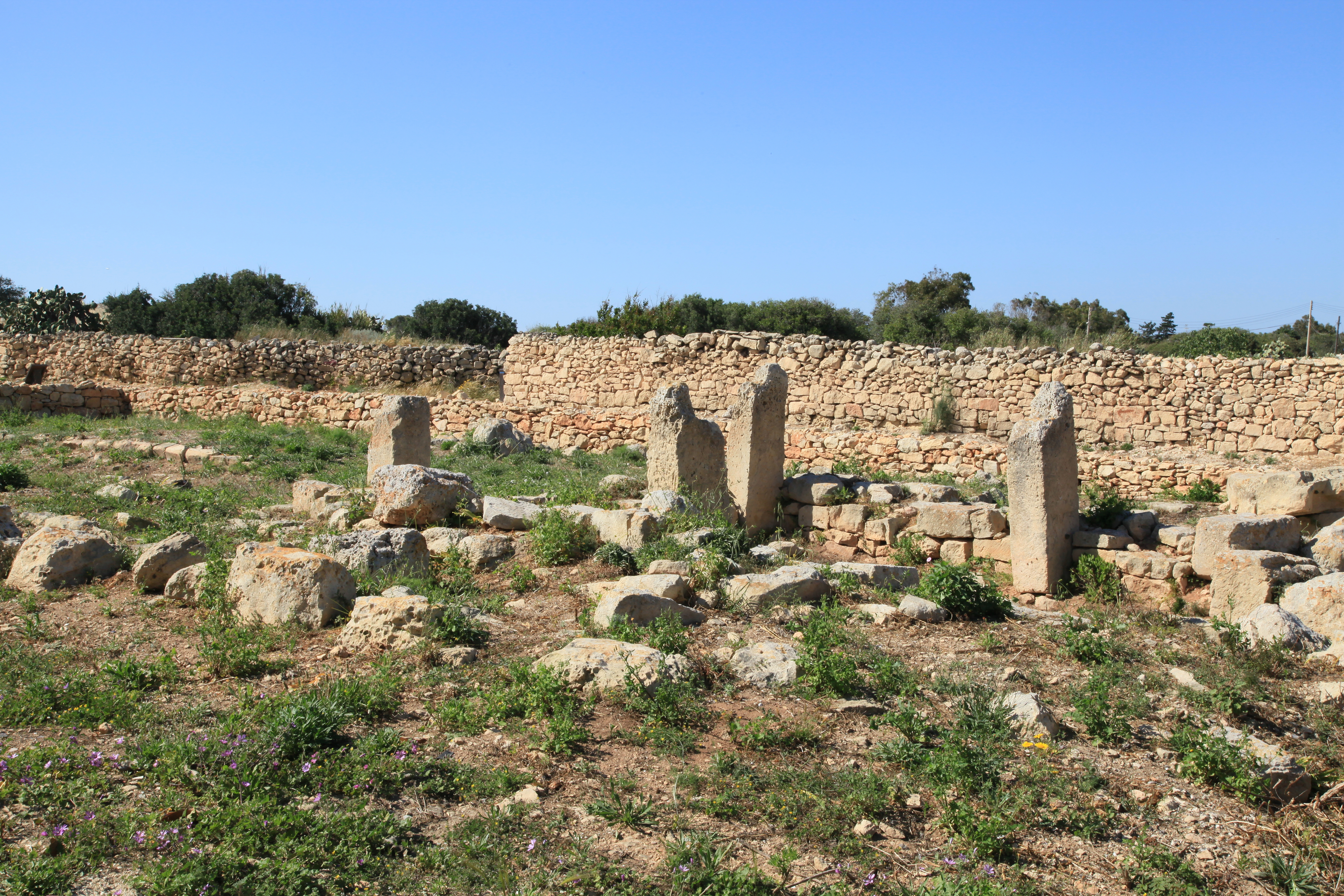
Ruins of Tal-Baqqari, an abandoned village near Żurrieq

Many small villages around Malta were abandoned between the 14th and 18th centuries. They were abandoned for several reasons, including corsair raids (such as the raids of 1429 and 1551), slow population decline, migration to larger villages as well as political changes such as the transfer of the capital from Mdina to Birgu in 1530, and to Valletta in 1571. Many villages were depopulated after a plague epidemic in 1592–93.

Of Malta's ten original parishes in 1436, two (Ħal Tartarni and Bir Miftuħ) no longer exist, while others such as Mellieħa were abandoned but rebuilt at a later stage. The existence of many of the other villages is known only from militia lists, ecclesiastical or notarial documents, or lists of lost villages compiled by scholars such as Giovanni Francesco Abela.

The villages usually consisted of a chapel surrounded by a number of farmhouses and other buildings. In some cases, such as Ħal-Millieri and Bir Miftuħ, the village disappeared but the chapel still exists.

== North Africa ==
Oases and villages in North Africa have been abandoned due to the expansion of the Sahara desert.

== Romania ==
Due to aging of population and immigration, a lot of villages in Romania, especially in Transylvania and notably villages of national heritage, became or are on the way to become depopulated. On a particular course, a lot of villages also became depopulated because of the migration of ethnic Transylvanian Saxons during the communist era of Romania. Notable examples include Lindenfeld, in Caraș-Severin county and Tomnatec and Cioclovina, in Hunedoara county.

== Russia ==
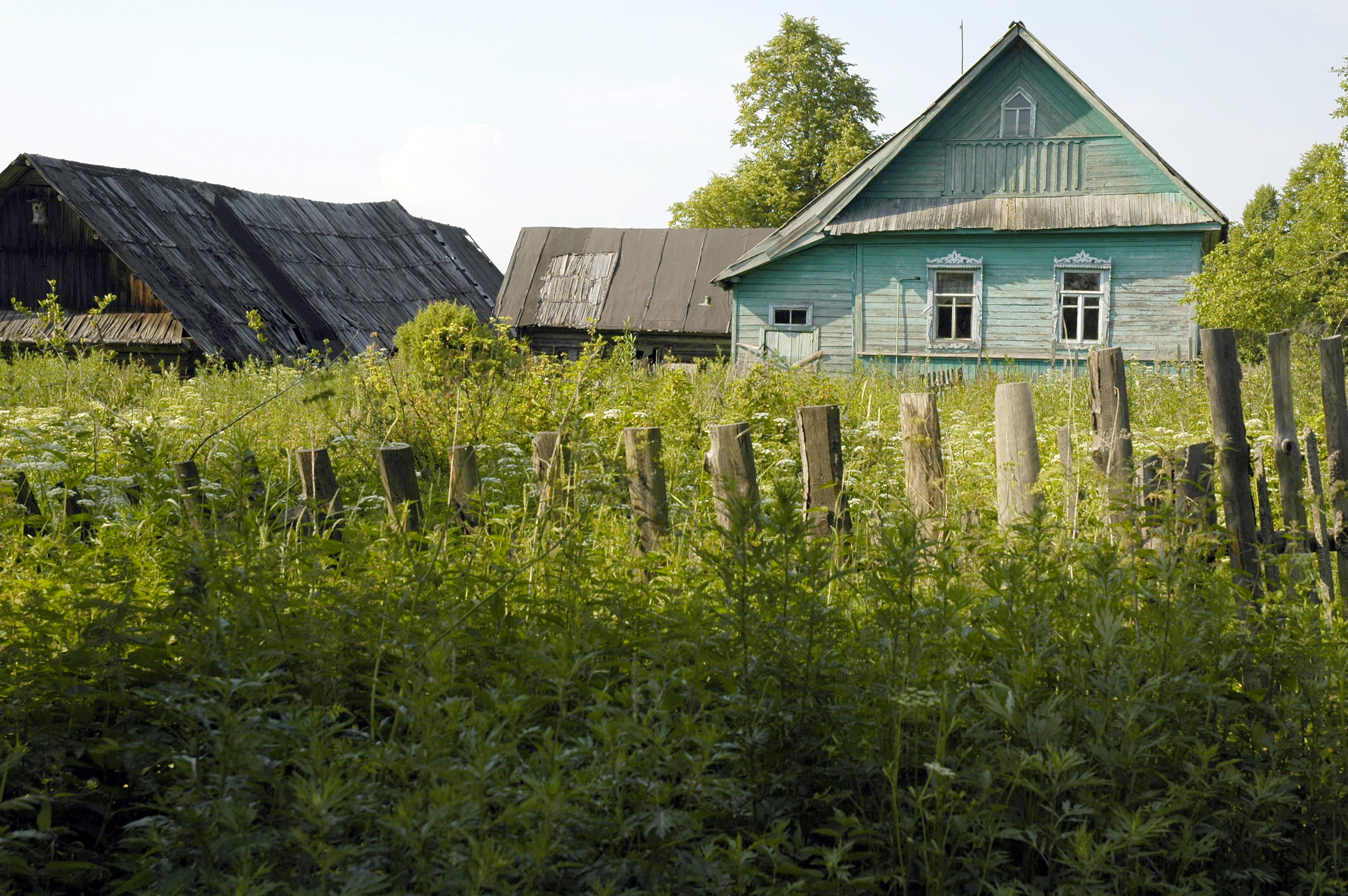
Abandoned village in the Tver Oblast of Russia

Thousands of abandoned villages are scattered across Russia.

Narmeln, the westernmost point of Russia, was a German village on the Vistula Spit until it became depopulated in 1945 during World War II. The Vistula Spit was split between Poland and the Soviet Union after the war, with Narmeln as the only settlement on the Soviet side. Narmeln was never repopulated as the Soviet side was made into an exclusion zone.

== Spain ==
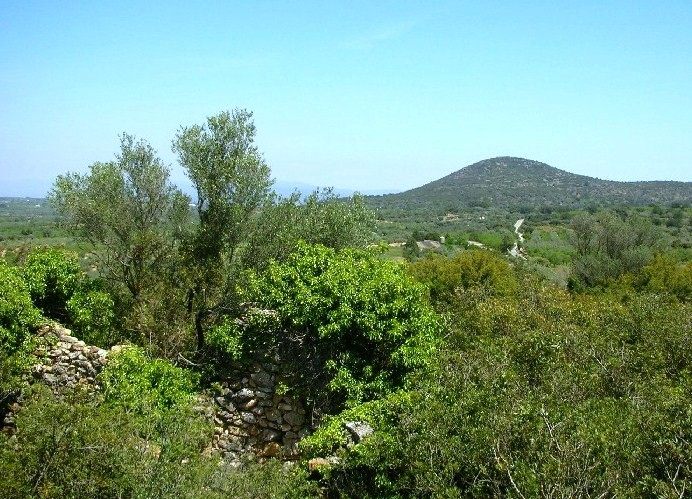
The abandoned village of Merades, Spain; part of the northernmost section of the ruins

Large zones of the mountainous Iberian System and the Pyrenees have undergone heavy depopulation since the early 20th century. In Spain there are many ghost towns scattered across mountain areas especially in Teruel Province.

The traditional agricultural practices such as sheep and goat rearing on which the village economy was based were not taken over by the local youth after the lifestyle changes that swept over rural Spain during the second half of the 20th century. The exodus from the rural mountainous areas in Spain rose steeply after General Franco's Plan de Estabilización in 1959. The population declined steeply as people emigrated towards the industrial areas of the large cities and the coastal towns where tourism grew exponentially.

The abandonment of agricultural land use practices drives the natural establishment of forests through ecological succession in Spain. This spontaneous forest establishment has several consequences for society and nature, such as increase of fire risk and frequency and biodiversity loss. Regarding biodiversity loss, research findings from Mediterranean showed that this is very site-dependent. More recently, the abandonment of land is also discussed by some as an opportunity for rewilding in rural areas in Spain.

== Syria ==
The Dead Cities are a group of abandoned villages in Northern Syria dating back to the times of Late Antiquity and the Byzantine Empire. They are a World Heritage Site.

After the occupation of the Golan Heights by Israel after its victory during the Six-Day War, more than 130,000 Syrians were expelled, and two towns as well as 163 villages were abandoned and destroyed.

In the 2010s, as a result of the Syrian civil war, many villages in Syria, both in areas under government control and under rebel control, have been depopulated. For example, the town of Darayya in Rural Damascus Governorate, with a pre-war population of 225,000 was completely depopulated during the war, and since its return to government control in 2016, only between 10% and 30% of its population have returned. Further north in Idlib Governorate, the two villages of Al-Fu'ah and Kafriya for example, were depopulated completely as their Twelver Shia population were evacuated.

== Ukraine ==
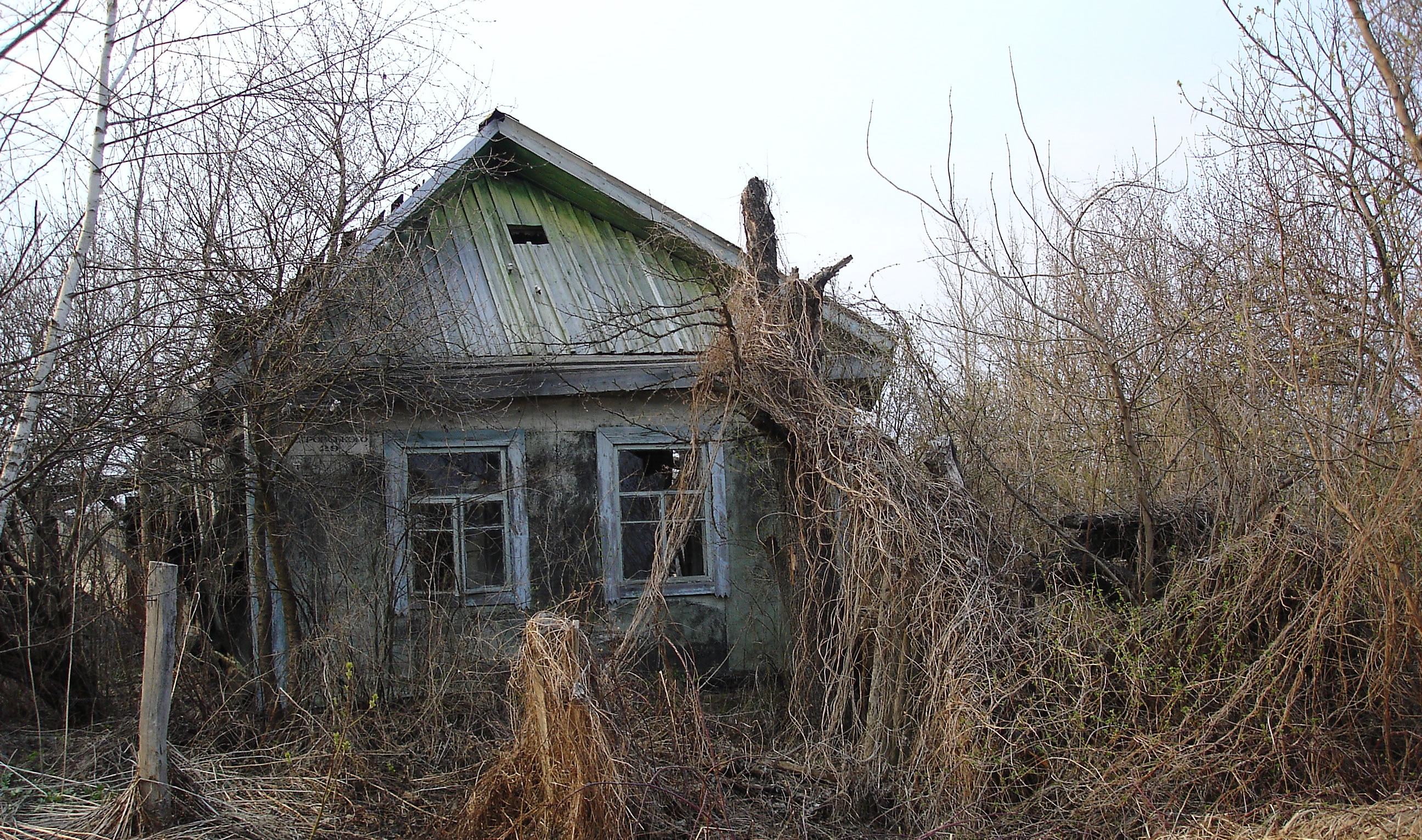
Abandoned village near Chernobyl

Following the 1986 Chernobyl disaster, a 2,600 km^{2} (1,000 sq mi) zone of exclusion was created and the entire population was evacuated to prevent exposure to radiation. Since then, a limited number of people have been allowed to return: 197 lived in the zone in 2012, down from 328 in 2007 and 612 in 1999. However, all of the villages and the main city of the region, Pripyat, are falling into decay. The only lived in settlement is Chernobyl which houses maintenance staff and scientists working at the nuclear power plant, although they can only live there for short periods of time.

== United Arab Emirates ==
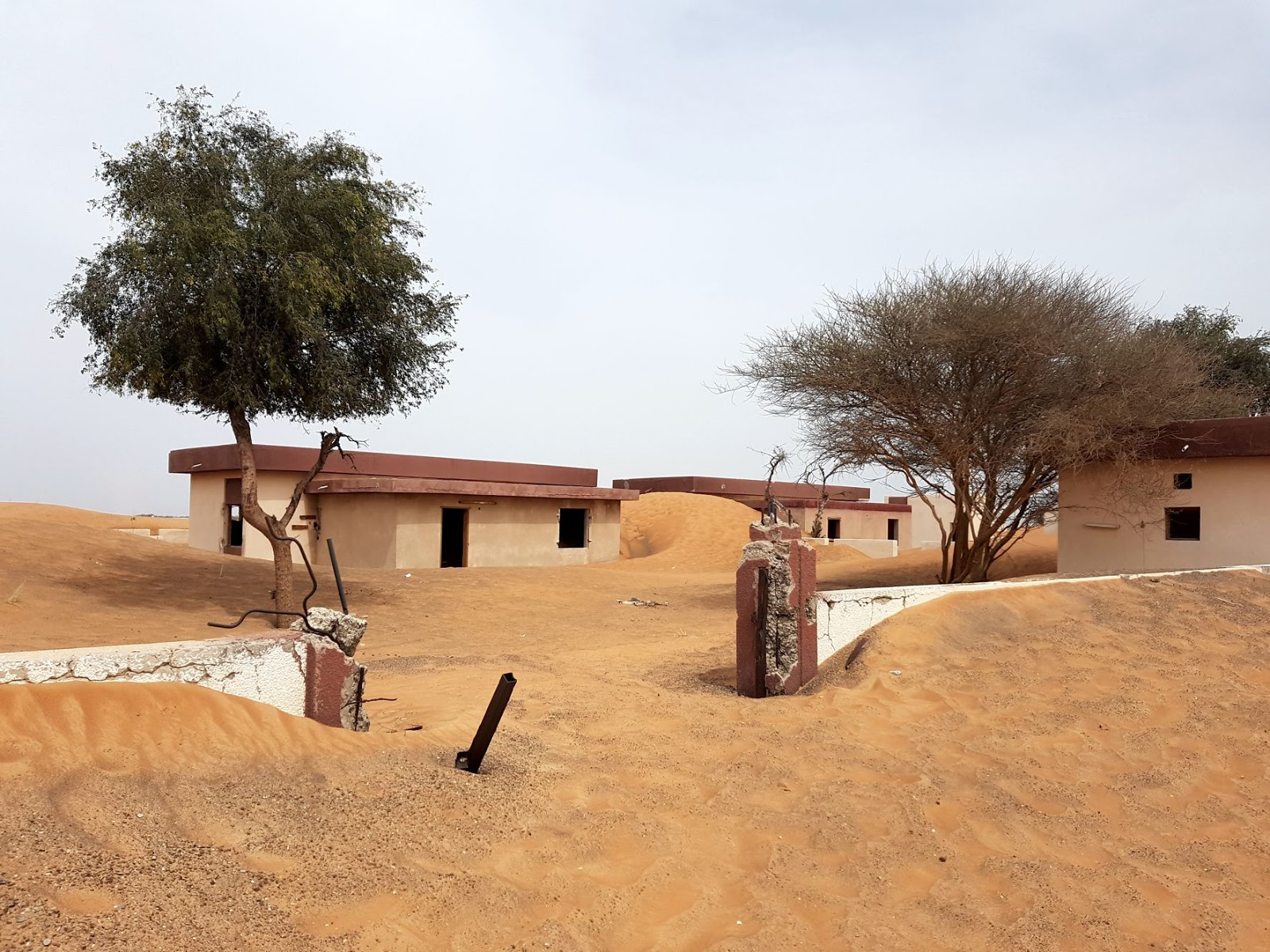
Abandoned houses and mosque in an abandoned village in Emirate of Sharjah, UAE

Al Madam was built in the 1970s and was developed as part of the government's modernization program, specifically targeting neighbouring tribes as a public housing project. With the intention of recreating the landscape during the unification of the seven emirates, the village includes 12 houses and a mosque, The rapid modernization of neighbouring states in the 1990s is cited as a reason for residents leaving. However, the exact reasons behind the mysterious exodus from the region remain uncertain.

== United Kingdom ==
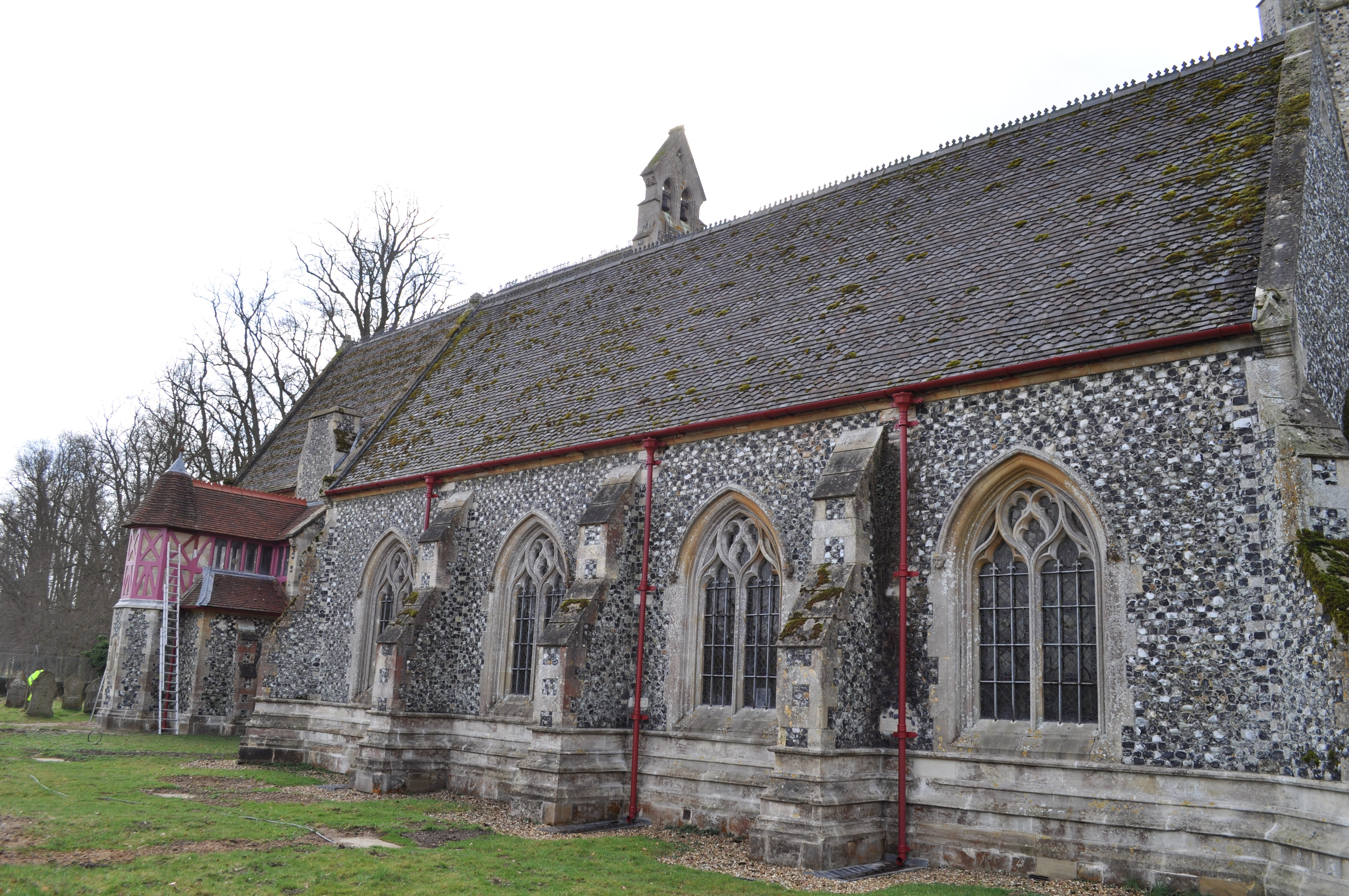
St Mary Church in West Tofts, Norfolk, a village which had its population relocated and was then incorporated into the Stanford Training Area facility.

Many villages in the United Kingdom have been abandoned throughout history. Some cases were the result of natural events, such as rivers changing course or silting up, or coastal and estuarine erosion.

Sometimes villages were deliberately cleared: the Harrying of the North caused widespread devastation in the winter of 1069–1070. In the 12th and 13th centuries, many villages were removed to make way for monasteries, and in the 18th century, it became fashionable for land-owning aristocrats to live in large mansions set in large landscaped parklands. Villages that obstructed the view were removed, although by the early 19th century it had become common to provide replacements.

In modern times, a few villages have been abandoned due to reservoirs being built and the location being flooded. These include Capel Celyn in Gwynedd, Wales, Mardale Green in the English Lake District and two villages—Ashopton and Derwent—drowned by the Ladybower Reservoir in Derbyshire. In other cases, such as Tide Mills, East Sussex, Imber and Tyneham, the village lands have been converted to military training areas. Villages in Northumberland have been demolished to make way for open-cast mines. Hampton-on-Sea was abandoned due to coastal erosion thought to have been exacerbated by the building of a pier. Several other villages had their populations relocated to make way for military installations; these include a group of villages in the vicinity of Thetford, Norfolk, which were emptied in 1942 to allow for the establishment of the Stanford Training Area, which incorporates the villages as part of the facility's training areas.

=== Deserted medieval villages ===
In the United Kingdom, a deserted medieval village (DMV) is a settlement that was abandoned during the Middle Ages, typically leaving no trace apart from earthworks or cropmarks. If there are three or fewer inhabited houses, the convention is to regard the site as deserted; if there are more than three houses, it is regarded as shrunken. The commonest causes of DMVs include failure of marginal agricultural land and clearance and enclosure following depopulation after the Black Death. The study of the causes of each settlement's desertion is an ongoing field of research.

England has an estimated 3,000 DMVs. One of the best known is Wharram Percy in North Yorkshire, where extensive archaeological excavations were conducted between 1948 and 1990. Its ruined church and former fishpond are still visible. Some other examples are Gainsthorpe in Lincolnshire, and Old Wolverton in Milton Keynes.

== See also ==
- Ghost estate
- Land recycling
- Medieval demography
- Modern ruins
- Old field (ecology)
- Passive rewilding
