= Aravichy =

Aravichy Аравічы (Belarusian) Оревичи (Russian) Orevichi
- Village
- Location within Belarus
- Coordinates: 51°35′57″N 29°51′28″E
- Country: Belarus
- Region: Gomel Region
- District: Khoiniki District
- Founded: 16th century

Population
  - Total: 0
- Time zone: UTC+3 (MSK)
- Area code: +375 2346
- License plate: 3

Aravichy (Belarusian: Аравічы; Russian: Оревичи, romanized: Orevichi) is an abandoned village in Khoiniki District, Gomel Region, Belarus.

== History ==
Founded in the 16th century, in 1959 its population was 923, with 222 families. Following the 1986 nuclear disaster of Chernobyl, it was abandoned and, from 1988, included in the Polesie State Radioecological Reserve; a Belarusian nature reserve that adjoins the Chernobyl Exclusion Zone in Ukraine.

== Geography ==
The village is located by the eastern shore of the Pripyat River, in front of Dzernavichy, between the cities of Pripyat, in Ukraine, and Narowlya. Other near towns are Khoiniki and Brahin.

== See also ==
- Ghost town
