= Reiherbach (Weser) =

River in Hesse, Germany

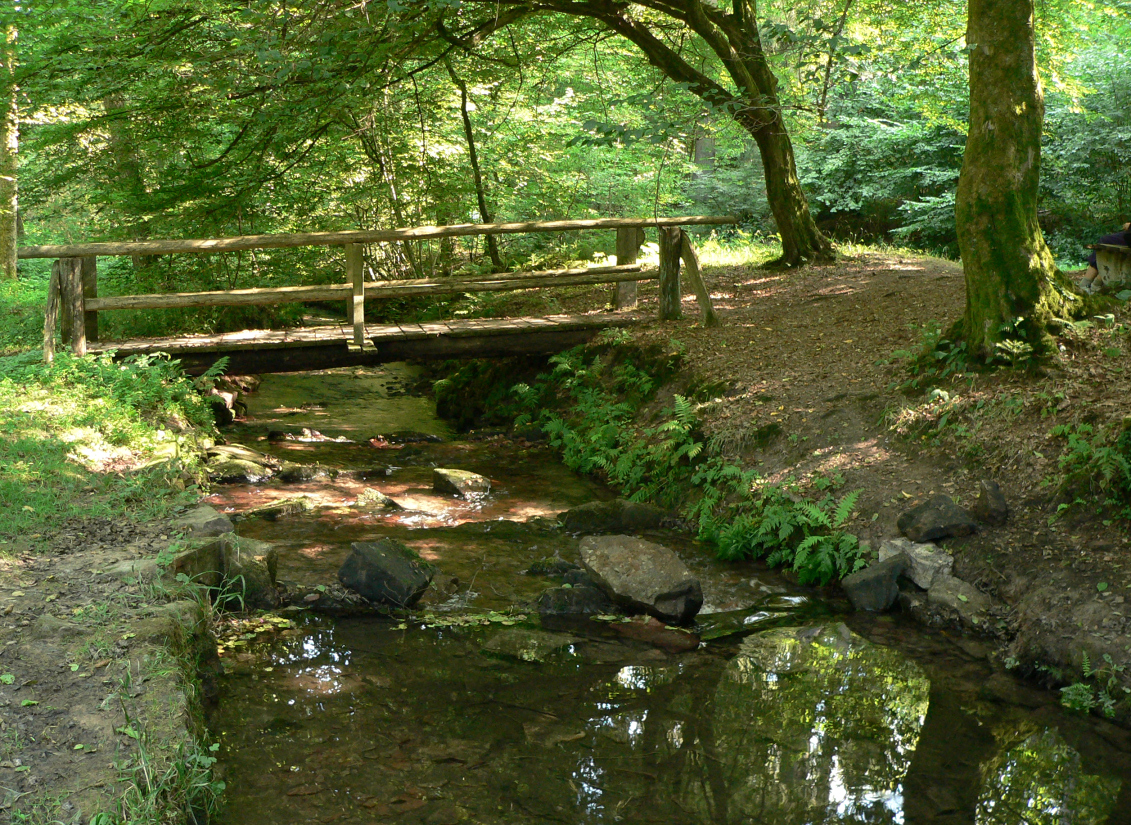

Location
- Country: Germany
- States: Lower Saxony

Physical characteristics
- Mouth
  - location: Weser
  - coordinates: 51.6381°N 9.5551°E

Basin features
- Progression: Weser→ North Sea

Reiherbach is a small river of Lower Saxony, Germany. It is a right tributary of the Weser in Bodenfelde.

== See also ==
- List of rivers of Lower Saxony
