= Suilbergau =

Suilbergau, also known as Suilbergi, and Sülberggau, was an early medieval county in the province of Eastphalia, in the Duchy of Saxony.

== Geography ==
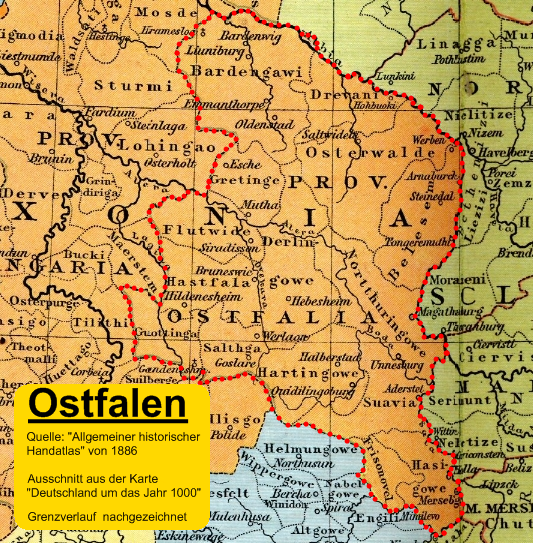
Map of Eastphalia in 1000 AD.

The gau comprised the narrow strip of land between the Solling forest and the Leine river, and connected to each other by the Ilme river. It bordered the counties of Wikanafeld and Aringo in the north, Rittigau in the east, the county of Moringen in the south and Allgäu in the west. Several villages in the eastern part of Suilbergau are now incorporated by Einbeck; several villages in the western part are now part of Dassel.

Suilbergau was the property of the archbishopric of Mainz, but the diocese of Hildesheim, which bordered Suilbergau to the north, had influence over the church in Dassel. In the west, Suilbergau bordered the diocese of Paderborn, which also had an interest in the area.

== History ==
Little is known about the history of Suilbergau. Its thingstead was on a hill between what is now Strodthagen and Sülbeck, two villages that now belong to Einbeck.

Suilbergau is mentioned in an early document as "pagus sulbergowe", when it was bestowed on Corvey Abbey, and witnessed by Reinold I of Dassel.

Several men are mentioned in a cartulary written by the monks of Corvey Abbey, on the western border of Suilbergau. These men are:

- Emmo (822 - 826)
- Theodger (826 - 853)
- Geroldus (854 - 877)
- Sigifridus (877)
- Bernhardus (900 - 916)

Early in the 12th century, Reinold I of Dassel, father of Rainald of Dassel, appears in documents. He and his sons established the county of Dassel.
