= List of Belarus-related topics =

The Flag of Belarus

The Coat of arms of Belarus

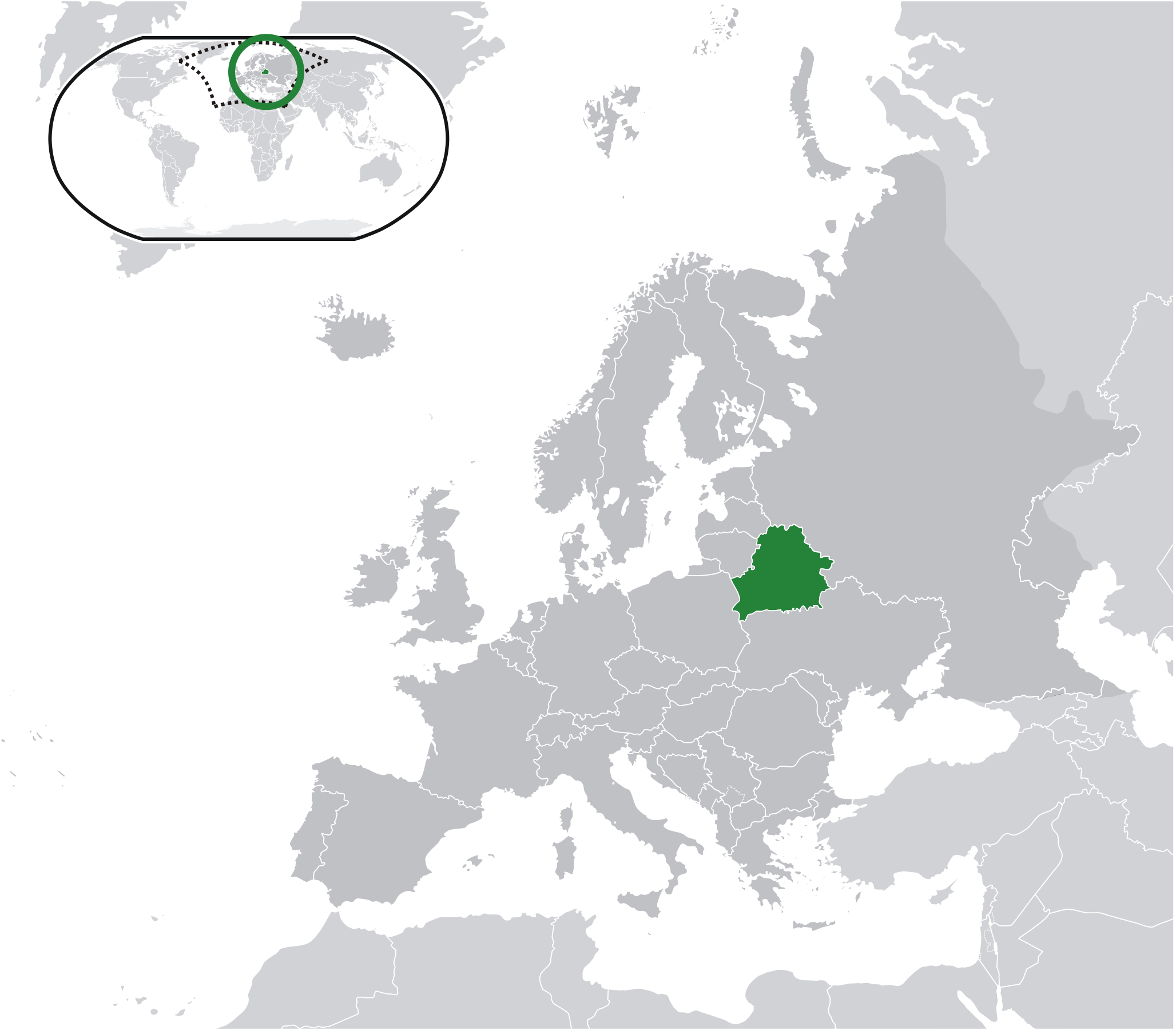
The location of Belarus

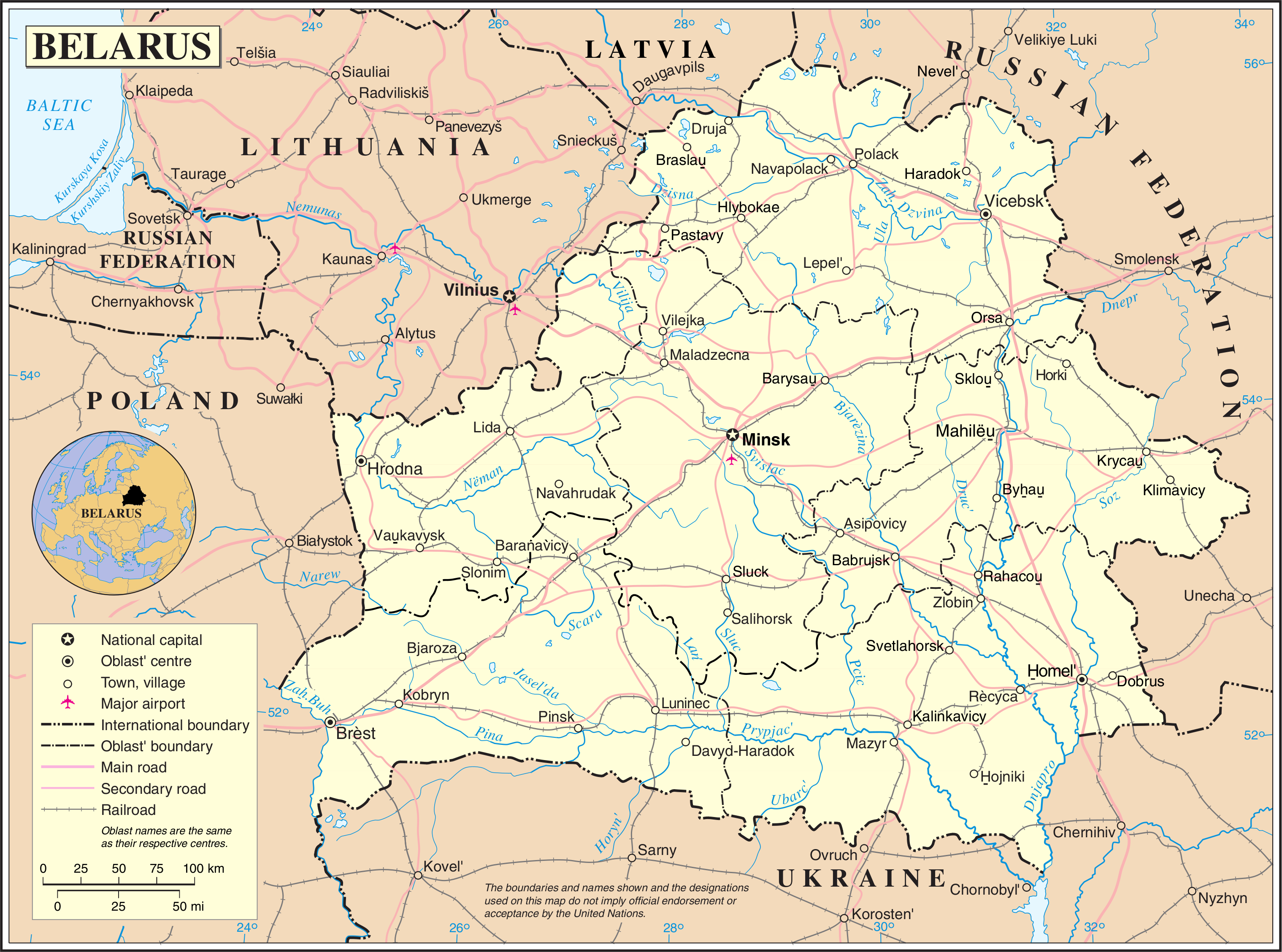
An enlargeable map of the Republic of Belarus

This is a list of topics related to Belarus. Those interested in the subject can monitor changes to the pages by clicking on Related changes in the sidebar.

== Belarus ==
- Belarus
- Belarusian diplomatic missions

== Communications in Belarus ==
- Communications in Belarus
- .by
- Internet in Belarus
  - Internet censorship in Belarus
- National State Teleradiocompany

== Conservation in Belarus ==
=== National parks of Belarus ===
- Bialowieza Forest
- List of national parks of Belarus

=== World Heritage Sites in Belarus ===
- Bialowieza Forest
- Mir Castle Complex
- Niasviž Castle
- Struve Geodetic Arc

Template:World Heritage Sites in Belarus

== Economy of Belarus ==
- Economy of Belarus
- Agriculture in Belarus
- Belarusian rubel
- Brest FEZ

=== Companies of Belarus ===
- List of Belarusian companies
- Belarusian Telegraph Agency
- Minsk Tractor Works

==== Automotive companies of Belarus ====
- Belshina

==== Motor vehicle manufacturers of Belarus ====
- BelAZ
- Minsk Automobile Plant

=== Trade unions of Belarus ===
- Belarus Free Trade Union
- Belarusian Congress of Democratic Trade Unions
- Federation of Trade Unions of Belarus

== Education in Belarus ==
=== Belarusian schoolteachers ===
- Honored Teacher of the Republic of Belarus
- Natallia Tryfanava

=== Universities in Belarus ===
- Academy of Public Administration under the aegis of the President of the Republic of Belarus
- Belarus universities
- Belarusian State Technological University
- Belarusian State University
- Belarusian State University of Informatics and Radioelectronics
- Republican Institute for Vocational Education
- Grodno State Agrarian University

== Fauna of Belarus ==
- Raccoon dog

== Geography of Belarus ==
- Geography of Belarus
- Administrative divisions of Belarus
- Belarusian Ridge
- Brest FEZ
- Dnieper-Bug Canal
- Dzyarzhynskaya Hara
- Extreme points of Belarus
- Kresy
- Kurapaty
- List of Biosphere Reserves in Belarus
- List of cities in Belarus
- List of places in Belarus
- Pinsk Marshes
- Podlaskie
- Polesia
- Vetka Island
- Łojeŭ
- Śvisłač (disambiguation)

=== Amusement parks in Belarus ===
- Chelyuskinites Park
- Gorky Park (Minsk)

=== Craters of Belarus ===
- Logoisk crater

=== Lakes of Belarus ===
- Lake Chervonoye
- Lake Drūkšiai
- Lake Narač
- Lake Osveya

=== Rivers of Belarus ===
- Babrujka River
- Berezina River
- Daugava
- Dnieper River
- Drahabuž River
- Drut River
- Horyn River
- Iput River
- Jasielda River
- Kasplya River
- Kotra River
- Lovat River
- Mukhavets River
- Narač River
- Narew
- Neman River
- Neris
- Niamiha River
- Pałata
- Pripyat River
- Ptyč
- Sozh River
- Styr River
- Svislach (Berezina)
- Svislach (Neman)
- Ūla River
- Bug River

=== Subdivisions of Belarus ===
- Administrative divisions of Belarus

==== Regions of Belarus ====
- Administrative divisions of Belarus
- ISO 3166-2:BY
- Brest Region
- Gomel Region
- Grodno Region
- Mogilev Region
- Minsk
- Minsk Region
- Vitebsk Region

===== Brest Region =====
- Kamenets District
- Kobryn District
- Pinsk District
- Stolin District
- Baranavichy District
- Biaroza District
- Brest District
- Brest Region
- Drahichyn District
- Hantsavichy District
- Ivanava District
- Ivatsevichy District
- Luninets District
- Lyakhavichy District
- Malaryta District
- Pruzhany District
- Zhabinka District

===== Gomel Region =====
- Gomel Region
- Akciabrski District
- Brahin District
- Buda-Kashalyowa District
- Chachersk District
- Chojniki District
- Dobrush District
- Dobrush
- Avrohom Elyashiv
- FC Slavia Mozyr
- Gomel Airport
- Gomel
- Gomel District
- Yelsk District
- Kalinkavichy
- Kalinkavichy District
- Lyelchytsy District
- Loyew District
- Mazyr
- Mazyr District
- Naroulia District
- Pyetrykaw District
- Rahačoŭ
- Rahačoŭ District
- Rechytsa District
- Rechytsa
- Svietlahorsk
- Svietlahorsk District
- Vietka District
- Zhlobin
- Zhlobin District
- Žytkavičy District

=== Towns in Belarus ===
- Antopal
- Asipovičy
- Ašmiany
- Astraviec
- Babinavičy
- Babruysk
- Baranovichi
- Barysaŭ
- Belaazyorsk
- Berazino
- Biaroza
- Biešankovičy
- Brasłaŭ
- Braslawl-Zawelski
- Brest, Belarus
- Buda-Kashalyowa
- Bychaw
- Čačersk
- Čašniki
- Červień
- Chavusy
- Davyd-Haradok
- Dobruš
- Drahičyn
- Dziatłava
- Dzyarzhynsk
- Hancavičy
- Haradok
- Hlybokaye
- Homyel
- Horki
- Hrodna
- Iŭje
- Ivacevičy
- Ivanava
- Jelsk
- Kalinkavichy
- Kamianiec
- Kareličy
- Khoiniki
- Kletsk
- Klimovichi
- Kobryn
- Kosava, Belarus
- Krichev
- Łahojsk
- Lakhva
- Lepiel
- Lida
- Liozna
- Łuniniec
- Lyahavichy
- Maladzyechna
- Mazyr
- Małaryta
- Meleshkovichi
- Miadzieł
- Mikachevitchy
- Minsk
- Mir, Belarus
- Mogilev
- Motal'
- Mstislavl
- Narowla
- Navahradak
- Navapolatsk
- Niasviž
- Orsha
- Pastavy
- Pinsk
- Polatsk
- Pruzhany
- Pyetrykaw
- Rahachow
- Rečyca
- Salihorsk
- Ščučyn
- Shkloŭ
- Slonim
- Slutsk
- Smarhon
- Śmiłavičy
- Stolin
- Stoŭptsy
- Svetlahorsk
- Svislach
- Tałačyn
- Tatarskaya Slabada
- Turaŭ
- Vassilyevichy
- Vaŭkavysk
- Vałožyn
- Vetka
- Vileyka
- Vitebsk
- Wysokie Litewskie
- Zasłaŭje
- Zhabinka
- Zhlobin
- Zhodzina
- Žytkavičy

==== Minsk ====
- Minsk
- BELOMO
- Belarus (tractor)
- Belarusfilm
- Belarusian State Technological University
- Belarusian State University
- Chelyuskinites Park
- Children's Railroad (Minsk)
- Dinamo Stadium (Minsk)
- FC Dinamo-93 Minsk
- Elektrit
- FC Dinamo Minsk
- FC Partizan Minsk
- FC Traktor Minsk
- FC Energetik-BGU Minsk
- Gorky Park (Minsk)
- History of Minsk
- Kurapaty
- MKAD (Minsk)
- Minsk (motorcycle)
- Minsk Blitz
- Minsk International Airport
- Minsk Province (Belarus)
- Minsk Terminal
- Minsk Tractor Works
- Minsk-1 Airport
- Mińsk Voivodeship
- Niamiha (disambiguation)
- Republican Institute for Vocational Education
- Traktor Stadium
- Water féerie

=== Villages in Belarus ===
- Maly Trostenets extermination camp
- Obech, Belarus
- Zdrawneva
- Zdzitava

== Healthcare in Belarus ==
- Kozlovichi Mental Asylum

== History of Belarus ==
- 30th Waffen Grenadier Division of the SS (1st Belarusian)
- Battle of Bereza Kartuska (1919)
- Battle of the Niemen River
- Belarusian Central Rada
- Belarusian National Republic
- Belarusian resistance movement
- Berestia
- Bielski partisans
- Black Ruthenia
- Michael Boleslaw
- Boris stones
- Butaw
- Butigeidis
- Butvydas
- Byelorussian SSR
- Chernobyl disaster
- Chorny Kot
- Cities of the Grand Duchy of Lithuania
- Coat of arms of the Polish–Lithuanian Commonwealth
- Curzon Line
- Dausprungas
- Demetrius I Starshiy
- Druck
- Duchy of Polatsk
- Duchy of Zasłaŭje
- Eastern Vilnius region
- Erdywil
- Flag of Byelorussian SSR
- Gediminids
- Gediminas of Lithuania
- Giligin
- Gimbut
- Ginwill
- Golden age of Belarusian history
- Grand Duchy of Lithuania
- Grand Duchy of Ruthenia
- Hero-Fortress
- Hetman
- Hetmans of the Polish–Lithuanian Commonwealth
- Jaunutis
- Jeans Revolution
- Jewna
- Jogaila
- Khatyn massacre
- Kęstutis
- Kiernus
- Kievan Rus'
- Knyaz
- Koniuszy
- Koriat
- Kozlovichi Mental Asylum
- Kukowoyt
- Kurapaty
- Lakhva
- Valeri Legasov
- Lipka Tatars
- List of castles of Belarus
- List of early East Slavic states
- Lithuanian–Belorussian Soviet Socialist Republic
- Lubart
- Maly Trostenets extermination camp
- Manvydas
- Military history of Belarus during World War II
- Military settlement
- Mindaugas
- Mindowhowna
- Mingayl
- History of Minsk
- Mir yeshiva
- Mongol invasion of Rus
- Montwił
- Mikhail Nikolayevich Muravyov-Vilensky
- Narymont
- Narymunt
- Occupation of Belarus by Nazi Germany
- Algirdas
- Pale of Settlement
- Palemon
- Partitions of Poland
- Polish Autonomous District
- Polish–Lithuanian Commonwealth
- Polish–Lithuanian–Muscovite Commonwealth
- Polish–Lithuanian–Ruthenian Commonwealth
- Polish–Lithuanian–Teutonic War
- Polonization
- Pukuwer
- Republic of Central Lithuania
- Roman Danylovich
- Roman of Ruthenia
- Royal coronations in Poland
- Russification
- Ryngold
- Severians
- Sigismund Kęstutaitis
- Sigismund Korybut
- Skirgaila
- Skirmunt
- Slutsk Affair
- Sovietization
- Steksys
- Svarn
- Sviatoslav Olgovich
- Švitrigaila
- Territorial changes of the Baltic states
- Towtiwil
- Treaty of Hadiach
- Treniota
- Ivan Trubetskoy
- Nikita Trubetskoy
- Nikolay Troubetzkoy
- Piotr Nikolaievich Troubetzkoy
- Yuri Troubetzkoy
- Traidenis
- Trubetsk
- Fiodor Trubetsky
- Iwan Trubetsky
- Nikita Kosoj Trubetsky
- Roman Trubetsky
- Symeon Trubetsky
- Symeon Perski Trubetsky
- Aleksey Trubetskoy
- Yuriy Trubetskoy
- Michał Trubetsky
- Fiodor Trubecki
- Pawel Troubetzkoy
- Wigund-Jeronym Trubecki
- Vladimir Waloc Trubetsky
- Union of Brest
- Union of Krewo
- Union of Lublin
- Uyezd
- Vaidotas
- Vaišvilkas
- Vajacki marš
- Voivodeship
- Volost
- Vseslav of Polotsk
- Vytenis
- Water féerie
- West Belarus
- White Russia
- White Ruthenia
- Yaropolk II of Kiev
- Yuriy of Ruthenia

=== Archaeological sites in Belarus ===
- Brest, Belarus
- Milograd culture

=== Battles of the Grand Duchy of Lithuania ===
- Battle of Aizkraukle
- Battle of Ţuţora (1620)
- Siege of Christmemel
- Battle of Durbe
- Battle on the Irpen' River
- Battle of Kircholm
- Battle of Orsha
- Battle of Wiłkomierz
- Battle of Połonka
- Battle of Skuodas
- Battle of Stångebro
- Battle of the Sun
- Battle of Vedrosha
- Battle of the Vorskla River

==== Battles of the Polish–Lithuanian–Teutonic War ====
- Battle of Grunwald
- Battle of Koronowo
- Siege of Marienburg (1410)

==== Battles of the Polish–Muscovite War (1605–1618) ====
- Battle of Dobrynichi
- Battle of Klushino
- Siege of Smolensk (1609–1611)
- Siege of Troitse-Sergiyeva Lavra

=== Chernobyl disaster ===
- Yury Bandazhevsky
- Bellesrad
- Chernobyl
- Chernobyl Heart
- Chernobyl Nuclear Power Plant
- Chernobyl Shelter Fund
- Chernobyl disaster
- Chernobyl disaster effects
- Chernobyl in the popular consciousness
- Chernobyl2020
- Commission de recherche et d'information indépendantes sur la radioactivité
- Elena Filatova
- Igor Kostin
- Klimovichi
- Valeri Legasov
- Liquidator (Chernobyl)
- New Safe Confinement
- Pripyat River
- Prypiat, Ukraine
- Adi Roche
- Slavutych
- Threat of the Dnieper reservoirs
- Zone of alienation

=== East Slavic history ===
- East Slavs
- Gostomysl
- Novgorod Republic
- Polonization
- Pskov Republic
- Truvor and Sineus
- Vadim the Bold

==== East Slavic manuscripts ====
- Bychowiec Chronicle
- Full Collection of Russian Chronicles
- Gertrude Psalter
- Halych-Volhynian Chronicle
- Hypatian Codex
- Ioachim Chronicle
- Izmaragd
- A Journey Beyond the Three Seas
- Kazan Chronicle
- Kiev Psalter of 1397
- Laurentian Codex
- Legal Code of Pskov
- Nominalia of the Bulgarian khans
- Novgorod Codex
- Novgorod First Chronicle
- Ostromir Gospel
- Peresopnytsia Gospels
- Primary Chronicle
- Radziwiłł Chronicle
- Russkaya Pravda
- Sudebnik
- The Tale of Igor's Campaign
- Zadonshchina

==== Kievan Rus ====
- Kievan Rus'
- Anna from Byzantium
- Architecture of Kievan Rus
- Baptism of Kievan Rus'
- Belozero Duchy
- Biritch
- Boris and Gleb
- Boris stones
- Church of the Tithes
- Coloman of Lodomeria
- Culture of ancient Rus
- Cumans
- Daniel of Halych
- De Administrando Imperio
- Dobrynya
- Drevlyans
- Druzhina
- Duchy of Polatsk
- East Slavs
- Etymology of Rus and derivatives
- Euphrosyne of Polatsk
- Full Collection of Russian Chronicles
- Garðaríki
- George I of Halych
- Georgius Tzul
- Gytha of Wessex
- Igor Svyatoslavich
- Ingegerd Olofsdotter
- Kiev Expedition
- Kievian Letter
- Konstantin Dobrynich
- Kurya (khan)
- Leo I of Halych
- List of early East Slavic states
- Malusha
- Metiga
- Mstislav the Bold
- Novgorod Codex
- Old East Slavic language
- Ostromir
- Ostromir Gospel
- Pechenegs
- Perun
- Posadnik
- Primary Chronicle
- Putyata
- Rogneda of Polotsk
- Rostislav of Slavonia
- Rulers of Kievan Rus'
- Rus' (people)
- Russkaya Pravda
- Ruthenia
- Severia
- Smerd
- Sveneld
- The Tale of Igor's Campaign
- Temple ring
- Tmutarakan
- Ukrainian hryvnia
- Varangians
- Veche
- Velikiy Novgorod
- Vladimir of Novgorod
- Vladimir-Suzdal
- Volhynians
- Votchina
- Vsevolod III, Grand Prince of Vladimir
- Vshchizh
- Vyachko
- Vyatichs
- Vyshata
- Vyshhorod
- Yan Vyshatich
- Zalesye

===== Battles of Kievan Rus =====
- Battle of Dorostolon
- Battle on the Irpen' River
- Battle of the Kalka River
- Siege of Ryazan
- Battle of the Sit River
- Battle of the Stugna River
- Battle of Zawichost

===== Rulers of Kievan Rus =====
- Askold and Dir
- Daniel of Halych
- Yuri Dolgoruki
- Family life and children of Vladimir I
- Gleb of Kiev
- Igor II of Kiev
- Igor, Grand Prince of Kiev
- Ingvar of Kiev
- Iziaslav I of Kiev
- Iziaslav II of Kiev
- Iziaslav III of Kiev
- Iziaslav IV Vladimirovich
- Michael of Chernigov
- Mikhail of Vladimir
- Mstislav I of Kiev
- Mstislav II of Kiev
- Mstislav III of Kiev
- Mstislav of Chernigov
- Oleg I of Chernigov
- Oleg of Novgorod
- Olga of Kiev
- Roman the Great
- Rostislav II of Kiev
- Rurik
- Rurik Rostislavich
- Sviatopolk I of Kiev
- Sviatopolk II of Kiev
- Sviatoslav I of Kiev
- Sviatoslav II of Kiev
- Sviatoslav III of Kiev
- Vladimir I of Kiev
- Vladimir II Monomakh
- Vladimir II Mstislavich
- Vladimir III Rurikovich
- Vseslav of Polotsk
- Vsevolod I of Kiev
- Vsevolod II of Kiev
- Vsevolod IV of Kiev
- Yaropolk I of Kiev
- Yaropolk II of Kiev
- Yaroslav I the Wise
- Yaroslav II of Kiev

=== East Slavic history stubs ===
- Anti-Slavism
- Battle of Dorostolon
- Battle on the Irpen' River
- Bychowiec Chronicle
- Garðaríki
- Gertrude of Poland
- Halych-Volhynian Chronicle
- Hilarion of Kiev
- Hypatian Codex
- Ioachim Chronicle
- Iziaslav II of Kiev
- Iziaslav III of Kiev
- Iziaslav IV Vladimirovich
- Kijów Voivodeship
- Knyaz Konstantin Konstantinovich Ostrozhskiy
- Koleda
- Konstantin of Murom
- Konyushy
- List of early East Slavic states
- Liubech
- Liškiava
- Mstislav II of Kiev
- Namestnik
- Ostroh
- Pereyaslavets
- Polish–Lithuanian–Ruthenian Commonwealth
- Portal:Russia/Russia-related Wikipedia notice board/Archive0
- Posad
- Ros' River
- Rostislav I of Kiev
- Saint Anthony of Kiev
- Sloboda
- Stanislav of Kiev
- Sviatoslav III of Kiev
- Sviatoslav Olgovich
- Template:East-Slavic-hist-stub
- Temple ring
- Theodosius of Kiev
- Tivertsi
- Union of Brest
- Uyezd
- Viacheslav I of Kiev
- Vladimir II Mstislavich
- Volost
- Votchina
- Yaropolk II of Kiev
- Yaroslav II of Kiev
- Šajkaši

=== Elections in Belarus ===
- Elections in Belarus
- 1995 Belarus Referendum
- 1996 Belarus Referendum
- 2004 Belarus Referendum
- 2006 Belarusian presidential election

=== Maps of the history of Belarus ===
- Maps of Belarus

=== Military history of Belarus during World War II ===
- Military history of Belarus during World War II
- Occupation of Belarus by Nazi Germany

=== Polish–Lithuanian Union ===
- Polish–Lithuanian Union
- Constitution of May 3, 1791
- Union of Grodno
- Union of Horodło
- Union of Krewo
- Union of Lublin
- Union of Mielnik
- Pact of Vilnius and Radom

=== Belarusian rulers ===
- Butigeidis
- Butvydas
- Daumantas of Lithuania
- Ginwill
- Gediminas of Lithuania
- Jaunutis
- Kukowoyt
- Mindaugas
- Mingayl
- Narymunt
- Pukuwer
- Rogneda of Polotsk
- Skirgaila
- Traidenis
- Treniota
- Vaišvilkas
- Vseslav of Polotsk
- Vytautas the Great
- Vytenis

=== Ruthenia ===
- Ruthenia
- Belarusian heraldry
- Grand Duchy of Ruthenia
- Okopy, Ternopil Oblast
- Pukuwer
- White Ruthenia

==== Ruthenian nobility ====
- Pukuwer
- Nick Rock'n'Roll

=== Uprisings of Belarus ===
- January Uprising
- Kościuszko Uprising
- November Uprising

=== Years in Belarus ===
==== 2006 in Belarus ====
- 2006 Belarusian presidential election
- Belarus at the 2006 Winter Olympics
- Belarus at the 2006 Winter Paralympics

=== Belarusian history stubs ===
- Battle of Wiłkomierz
- Battle of Połonka
- Battle of Vedrosha
- Belarusian Marseillaise
- Bychowiec Chronicle
- History of the Jews in Belarus
- List of early East Slavic states
- Lithuanian–Belorussian Soviet Socialist Republic
- Milograd culture
- Polish Autonomous District
- Polish–Lithuanian union
- Polish–Lithuanian–Ruthenian Commonwealth
- Template:Belarus-hist-stub
- Union of Grodno
- West Belarus
- Western Krai

== Images of Belarus ==
- Template:PD-BY-exempt

== Belarusian law ==
- Article 181 (Criminal Code of Belarus)
- Capital punishment in Belarus
- Constitution of Belarus
- Constitutional Court of Belarus
- Gay rights in Belarus
- Human rights in Belarus
  - Censorship in Belarus
- Supreme Court of Belarus

=== Law enforcement in Belarus ===
- State Security Agency of the Republic of Belarus (KDB in Belarusian, KGB in Russian)
- Militsiya
- Ministry of Internal Affairs of Belarus
- Presidential Guard (Belarus)

== Maps of Belarus ==
- Maps of Belarus

=== Old maps of Belarus ===
- Maps of Belarus

== Belarusian media ==
- Media in Belarus
- Belarusian Association of Journalists
- Internet in Belarus
- .by
- Censorship in Belarus

=== Belarusian journalists ===
- Veronika Cherkasova
- Siarhiej Dubaviec
- Andrej Dyńko
- Ihar Hermianchuk
- Piotra Sych
- Dmitry Zavadsky

=== Newspapers published in Belarus ===
- Belorusy i rynok
- Biełarus
- Homan
- Homan (1884)
- Narodnaja Volya (newspaper)
- Naša Niva
- Zviazda

See also List of newspapers in Belarus

=== Radio stations in Belarus ===
- List of radio stations in Belarus
- Belarusian Radio
- European Radio for Belarus
- Radio Stil (Belarus)

== Military of Belarus ==
- Armed Forces of Belarus
- Brest Fortress

== Organizations based in Belarus ==
- Belarusian Helsinki Committee
- Committee for Standardization, Metrology and Certification of Belarus
- Union of Poles in Belarus
- World Association of Belarusians

=== Youth organizations based in Belarus ===
- Belarusian Republican Youth Union
- Belarusian Scout Association
- National Scout Association of Belarus
- Scouting in Belarus
- The Association of Belarusian Guides

==== Scouting in Belarus ====
- Scouting in Belarus
- Belarusian Scout Association
- National Scout Association of Belarus
- The Association of Belarusian Guides

== Belarusian people ==
- Fabijan Abrantovich
- Stanisław Bułak-Bałachowicz
- Katsia Damankova
- Mikhail Doroshevich
- Dregovichs
- Drevlyans
- Valery Fabrikant
- Andrei Gromyko
- Uładzimir Karvat
- Vital Kramko
- Litvins
- Pyotr Masherov
- Vladimir Motyl
- Pyotr Mstislavets
- Polochans
- Nikolai Przhevalsky
- Andrey Romashevsky
- Evgeny Ruman
- Anthony Sawoniuk
- Francysk Skaryna
- Svyatopolk-Mirsky
- Symon Budny
- Immanuel Velikovsky
- Michał Vituška
- Rostislav Yankovsky
- Vladimir Yarets

=== Belarusian people by occupation ===
==== Belarusian singers ====
- Angelica Agurbash
- Viktor Kalina
- Natalia Podolskaya
- Rusya
- Seryoga
- Polina Smolova

==== Belarusian bishops ====
- Kazimierz Świątek

==== Belarusian cosmonauts ====
- Pyotr Klimuk
- Vladimir Kovalyonok

==== Belarusian mathematicians ====
- Semyon Aranovich Gershgorin

==== Belarusian sculptors ====
- Antoine Pevsner
- Ossip Zadkine

=== Belarus born people ===
- S. Ansky
- Menachem Begin
- Ignacy Domeyko
- Felix Edmundovich Dzerzhinsky
- Joseph Günzburg
- Simon Halkin
- Ignacy Hryniewiecki
- Bronislaw Kaminski
- Tadeusz Kościuszko
- Eliza Orzeszkowa
- Valeriy Serdyukov

=== Belarusian Jews ===
- Zhores Ivanovich Alferov
- Bernhard Baron
- Menachem Begin
- Isaac Dov Berkowitz
- Chaim Berlin
- Naftali Zvi Yehuda Berlin
- Brisk yeshivas and methods
- Marc Chagall
- Pinkhos Churgin
- Morris Raphael Cohen
- David Dubinsky
- Simon Dubnow
- Avrohom Elyashiv
- Yakov Gamarnik
- Boris Gelfand
- Chaim Ozer Grodzinski
- Abraham Harkavy
- Hesya Helfman
- History of the Jews in Belarus
- Dawid Janowski
- Yaakov Yisrael Kanievsky
- Avraham Yeshayahu Karelitz
- Berl Katznelson
- Jakob Klatzkin
- Lakhva
- Mir yeshiva
- Shmuel Plavnik
- Lev Polugaevsky
- Mendele Mocher Sforim
- Yitzhak Shamir
- Refael Shapiro
- Shimon Shkop
- Chaim Shmuelevitz
- Chaim Soloveitchik
- Joseph Soloveitchik
- Moshe Soloveichik
- Yitzchak Zev Soloveitchik
- Chaïm Soutine
- Chaim Volozhin
- Lev Vygotsky
- Elchonon Wasserman
- Chaim Weizmann
- Ossip Zadkine

=== People of Belarusian descent ===
==== Belarusian Americans ====
- Bernhard Baron
- Morris Raphael Cohen
- Kirk Douglas
- Michael Douglas
- David Dubinsky
- Leon Kobrin
- Louis B. Mayer
- Natalia Mishkutenok
- David Sarnoff
- Simeon Strunsky
- Mikałaj Sudziłoŭski
- Jan Zaprudnik
- Oscar Zariski

==== Belarusian Australians ====
- Dmitri Markov
- Sidney Myer

==== Belarusian Russians ====
- Zhores Ivanovich Alferov
- Sergei Gorlukovich
- Andrey Makarevich
- Valeria Novodvorskaya
- Dmitri Shostakovich
- Georgy Shpak

==== Belarusian Ukrainians ====
- Artem Milevskyi
- Viktor Yanukovych

==== Belarusian Canadians ====
- Valery Fabrikant
- Albert Gretzky
- Walter Gretzky
- Wayne Gretzky
- Ivonka Survilla

==== Belarusian Polish people ====
- Włodzimierz Cimoszewicz
- Eugeniusz Czykwin

==== Belarusian Uruguayans ====
- Carlos Sherman

=== Belarusian nobility ===
- Szlachta
- Butigeidis
- Butvydas
- Jan Karol Chodkiewicz
- Dymitr Korybut
- Felix Edmundovich Dzerzhinsky
- Erdywil
- Gediminas of Lithuania
- Gimbut
- Ginwill
- Jaunutis
- Jewna
- Kiernus
- Knyaz
- Tadeusz Kościuszko
- Kukowoyt
- Lubart
- Manvydas
- Mindaugas
- Mingayl
- Montwił
- Narymunt
- Julian Ursyn Niemcewicz
- Algirdas
- Konstanty Ostrogski
- Palemon
- Palemonids
- Pukuwer
- Franciszka Urszula Radziwiłłowa
- Michał Kazimierz "Rybeńko" Radziwiłł
- Radziwiłł
- Princess Eugénie of Greece and Denmark
- Sanguszko
- Sapieha
- Lew Sapieha
- Kazimierz Siemienowicz
- Skirgaila
- Traidenis
- Treniota
- Fiodor Trubecki
- Wigund-Jeronym Trubecki
- Vaišvilkas
- Vytenis

==== Chodkiewicz ====
- Anna Eufrozyna Chodkiewicz
- Jan Karol Chodkiewicz
- Jan Kazimierz Chodkiewicz
- Krzysztof Chodkiewicz
- Teresa Chodkiewicz

==== Kuncewicz ====
- Kuncewicz

==== Ostrogski ====
- Ostrogski
- Aleksander Ostrogski
- Anna Alojza Ostrogska
- Coat of arms of Ostrogski
- Janusz Ostrogski
- Katarzyna Ostrogska (1560–1579)
- Katarzyna Ostrogska (1602–1642)
- Konstanty Ostrogski
- Konstanty Wasyl Ostrogski
- Zofia Ostrogska

==== Radzivil ====
- Radzivil
- Albrycht Stanislav Radzivil
- Albrycht Vladyslav Radzivil
- Aleksander Ludwig Radzivil
- Anna Christina Radzivil
- Anna Radzivil
- Anna Radzivil (1476–1522)
- Anthony Radzivil
- Antoni Radzivil
- Barbara Radzivil
- Boguslav Radzivil
- Carole Radzivil
- Cecylia Maria Radzivil
- Dominik Hieronim Radzivil
- Dominik Nikolaj Radzivil
- Princess Eugénie of Greece and Denmark
- Gregori IV Radzivil
- Hieronim Florian Radzivil
- Hieronim Wincenty Radziwiłł
- Janush Radzivil (1579–1620)
- Janush Radzivil (1612–1655)
- Jezhy Radzivil
- Jezhy Radzivil (1556–1600)
- Joanna Katerina Radzivil
- Józef Nikolaj Radzivil
- Kniaz' Stanislav "Kniaginia Kochanku" Radzivil
- Kniaz' Stanislav Radzivil (1669–1719)
- Karolina Teresa Radzivil
- Katerina Barbara Radzivil
- Katerina Karolina Radzivil
- Kristina Radzivil
- Kristof Nikolaj "the Lightning" Radzivil
- Kristof Nikolaj Radzivil
- Kristof Radzivil
- Lee Radzivil
- Matvej Radzivil
- Michail Gedeon Radzivill
- Michail Hieronim Radzivil
- Michail Kazimir "Rybeńko" Radzivil
- Michail Kazimir Radzivil
- Nikolaj "the Black" Radzivil
- Nikolaj "the Red" Radzivil
- Nikolaj Kristof "the Orphan" Radzivil
- Nikolaj Kristof Radzivil
- Nikolaj VII Radzivil
- Mir Castle Complex
- Niasvizh Castle
- Franciska Ursula Radzivilova
- Radzivill Chronicle
- Stanislav Albrecht Radzivil
- Tekla Róza Radzivil
- Zigmund Karol Radzivil

==== Trubetskoy ====
- Trubetskoy
- Aleksey Trubetskoy
- Ivan Betskoy
- Coat of arms of Druck
- Coat of arms of Pogoń Litewska
- Coat of arms of Trubetsky
- Demetrius I Starszij
- Dmitry Troubetskoy
- Fiodor Trubetsky
- Grigory Troubetzkoy
- Igor Troubetzkoy
- Ivan Trubetskoy
- Iwan Trubetsky
- Michał Trubetsky
- Nestor Troubetzkoy
- Nikita Trubetskoy
- Nikita Kosoj Trubetsky
- Nikolai Trubetzkoy
- Nikolay Troubetzkoy
- Paolo Troubetzkoy
- Pawel Troubetzkoy
- Peter Troubetzkoy
- Pierre Troubetzkoy
- Piotr Nikolaievich Troubetzkoy
- Piotr Trubecki
- Roman Trubetsky
- Sergei Petrovich Troubetzkoy
- Symeon Perski Trubetsky
- Symeon Trubetsky
- Fiodor Trubecki
- Wigund-Jeronym Trubecki
- Tõnu Trubetsky
- Vladimir Petrovich Trubetskoy
- Vladimir Waloc Trubetsky
- Yuri Troubetzkoy
- Yuriy Trubetskoy

=== Belarusian saints ===
- Cyril of Turaw
- Euphrosyne of Polatsk
- Jozafat Kuncewicz

=== Belarusian people stubs ===
- Alaksandar Dubko
- Alaksandar Kazulin
- Aldona Ona of Lithuania
- Alyaksandr Sulima
- Alexander Medved
- Andrei Dapkiunas
- Andrei Mikhnevich
- Andrei Rybakou
- Anthony Sawoniuk
- Anton Prylepau
- Artem Kontsevoy (footballer, born 1983)
- Artem Kontsevoy (footballer, born 1999)
- Bernhard Baron
- Boris Gelfand
- Butaw
- Butvydas
- Coloman of Lodomeria
- Demetrius I Starshiy
- Dmitri Dashinski
- Dmitry Debelka
- Dmitry Zavadsky
- Eduard Malofeev
- Elena Korosteleva
- Ellina Zvereva
- Erdywil
- Franciszka Urszula Radziwiłłowa
- Frants Kostyukevich
- Gennadiy Moroz
- Gennady Grushevoy
- George I of Halych
- Hanna Batsiushka
- Ihar Hermianchuk
- Inna Zhukova
- Irina Yatchenko
- Ivonka Survilla
- Jaunutis
- Jewna
- Katsia Damankova
- Koriat
- Larissa Loukianenko
- Lubart
- Magomed Aripgadjiev
- Manvydas
- Maxim Tank
- Michael Boleslaw
- Michaił Karčmit
- Mihas' Klimovich
- Mikalay Husowski
- Mikhail Grabovski
- Mikhail Marynich
- Mingayl
- Myechyslaw Ivanavich Hryb
- Nadzeya Astapchuk
- Narymont
- Narymunt
- Natallia Mikhnevich
- Natallia Sazanovich
- Natallia Solohub
- Natallia Tryfanava
- Natalya Baranovskaya
- Natalya Shikolenko
- Niescier Sakałoŭski
- Olga Kardopoltseva
- Pavel Kastusik
- Pavieł Maryjaŭ
- Polina Smolova
- Pyotr Mstislavets
- Roman Danylovich
- Rostislav II of Kiev
- Rostislav Yankovsky
- Ruslan Alekhno
- Ryhor Reles
- Ryta Turava
- Sergei Aleinikov
- Sergei Gaidukevich
- Sergei Liakhovich
- Sergey Sidorsky
- Shlomo Heiman
- Sigismund Kestutaitis
- Sigismund Korybut
- Skirmunt
- Svarn
- Symon Budny
- Tatsiana Stukalava
- Template:Belarus-bio-stub
- Towtiwil
- Uladzimir Karyzna
- Uladzimir Navumau
- Uładzimir Hančaryk
- Uładzimir Karvat
- Vadim Devyatovskiy
- Vaidotas
- Vaišvilkas
- Valentin Belkevich
- Valentina Tsybulskaya
- Viktor Reneysky
- Vintsent Dunin-Martsinkyevich
- Vital Kramko
- Vladimir Goncharik
- Vladimir Vasilkovich
- Vladimir Veremeenko
- Vladimir Voltchkov
- Vyacheslav Hleb
- Vyacheslav Yanovskiy
- Vytenis
- Yakub Kolas
- Yanka Kupala
- Yechezkel Levenstein
- Yevgeniy Misyulya
- Yulia Raskina
- Yuriy of Ruthenia

== Politics of Belarus ==
- Politics of Belarus
- A Day of Solidarity with Belarus
- Belarusian Helsinki Committee
- Freedom Day (Belarus)
- Human rights in Belarus
  - Censorship in Belarus
- Jeans Revolution
- Ministry of Internal Affairs of Belarus
- Water féerie
- Zubr (political organization)

=== Foreign relations of Belarus ===
- Foreign relations of Belarus
- Belarusian-American relations
- Belarusian-European Union relations
- Belarus Democracy Act of 2004
- Eastern Vilnius region
- George A. Krol
- List of Ambassadors from the United Kingdom to Belarus
- List of ambassadors of the United States to Belarus
- Territorial changes of the Baltic States
- Union of Russia and Belarus

==== Belarusian diplomats ====
- Andrei Dapkiunas
- Mikhail Khvostov

=== Political parties in Belarus ===
- List of political parties in Belarus
- Agrarian Party of Belarus
- Beer Lovers Party (Belarus)
- Belarusian Labour Party
- Belarusian People's Front
- Belarusian Social Democratic Party (Assembly)
- Belarusian Social Democratic Party (People's Assembly)
- Belarusian Socialist Sporting Party
- Belarusian Women's Party "Nadzieja"
- Communist Party of Belarus
- Conservative Christian Party
- Democratic Centrist Coalition
- European Coalition Free Belarus
- Liberal Democratic Party of Belarus
- Party of Communists of Belarus
- People's Coalition 5 Plus
- Republic (Belarus)
- Republican Party of Labor and Justice
- Social Democratic Party of Popular Accord
- United Civil Party of Belarus
- United Democratic Forces of Belarus
- Young Belarus

=== Belarusian politicians ===
- Radasłaŭ Astroŭski
- Alaksandar Dubko
- Yakov Gamarnik
- Ihar Hermianchuk
- Myechyslaw Ivanavich Hryb
- Alaksandar Kazulin
- Anatoly Lebedko
- List of Belarusian Prime Ministers
- Alexander Lukashenko
- Pavieł Maryjaŭ
- Mikhail Marynich
- Pyotr Masherov
- Alaksandar Milinkievič
- Uladzimir Naumau
- Zianon Pazniak
- Lew Sapieha
- Stanislav Shushkevich
- Mikałaj Sudziłoŭski
- Ivonka Survilla
- Vincuk Viačorka
- Vladimir Goncharik
- Jury Zacharanka

==== Belarusian revolutionaries ====
- Gesya Gelfman
- Ignacy Hryniewiecki
- Konstanty Kalinowski

==== Presidents of Belarus ====
- Alexander Lukashenko

==== Prime Ministers of Belarus ====
- Sergey Sidorsky

=== Belarusian politics stubs ===
- 2004 Belarus Referendum
- All Belarusian People's Assembly
- Belarusian Helsinki Committee
- Belarusian Labour Party
- Belarusian Social Democratic Party (Assembly)
- Belarusian Social Democratic Party (People's Assembly)
- Charter 97
- Conservative Christian Party
- European Coalition Free Belarus
- The Free Belarus Initiative
- Freedom Day (Belarus)
- Party of Communists of Belarus
- People's Coalition 5 Plus
- Republic (Belarus)
- Republican Party of Labor and Justice
- Social Democratic Party of Popular Accord
- Template:Belarus-politics-stub
- United Civil Party of Belarus
- United Democratic Forces of Belarus
- Water féerie
- Zubr (political organization)

== Religion in Belarus ==
- Belarusian Autocephalous Orthodox Church
- Belarusian Greek Catholic Church
- Hinduism in Belarus
- Roman Catholicism in Belarus

=== Cemeteries in Belarus ===
- Kalvaryja

== Science and technology in Belarus ==
- BelKA
- Belarus (tractor)
- Bellesrad
- ES EVM
- ES PEVM
- Minsk (motorcycle)
- Minsk family of computers
- National Academy of Sciences of Belarus

=== Belarusian scientists ===
- Yury Bandazhevsky
- Fiodar Fiodaraŭ
- Gennady Grushevoy
- Yefim Karskiy
- Zianon Pazniak
- Vladimir Platonov
- Stanislav Shushkevich
- Kazimierz Siemienowicz
- Mikałaj Sudziłoŭski
- Lev Vygotsky
- Oscar Zariski

==== Belarusian historians ====
- Mikałaj Ułaščyk
- Jan Zaprudnik

== Belarusian society ==
- Chernobyl Children's Project International
- Demographics of Belarus
- Freedom Day (Belarus)
- Gay rights in Belarus
- Human rights in Belarus
  - Censorship in Belarus
- Miss Belarus
- Poleszuk
- Public holidays in Belarus

=== Awards and decorations of Belarus ===
- Awards and decorations of Belarus
- Hero of Belarus

== Sport in Belarus ==
- Belarus national bandy team
- Belarus at the 2006 Winter Paralympics
- Belarus at the Olympics
- Belarusian national men's ice hockey team

=== Athletics in Belarus ===
==== Belarus at the European Championships in Athletics ====
- Belarus at the 2006 European Championships in Athletics

=== Sports festivals hosted in Belarus ===
- 1998 European Amateur Boxing Championships

=== Football in Belarus ===
- Belarus national football team
- Belarus women's national football team
- Football Federation of Belarus

==== Belarusian football competitions ====
- Belarusian Cup
- Belarusian Premier League
- Belarusian First League

==== Belarusian football managers ====
- Eduard Malofeev
- Yuri Puntus

==== Belarusian footballers ====
- Sergei Aleinikov
- Valentin Belkevich
- Sergei Gorlukovich
- Sasha Gotsmanov
- Sergei Gurenko
- Alexander Hleb
- Vyacheslav Hleb
- Timofei Kalachev
- Vasily Khomutovsky
- Artem Kontsevoy
- Vitali Kutuzov
- Eduard Malofeev
- Yuri Puntus
- Maxim Romaschenko
- Alyaksandr Sulima

==== Belarusian football clubs ====
- List of football clubs in Belarus
- BATE Borisov
- FC Dinamo Minsk
- FC Dnepr Mogilev
- FC Belshina Bobruisk
- FC Darida Minsk District
- FC Dinamo Brest
- FC SKVICH Minsk
- FC Vitebsk
- FC Naftan Novopolotsk
- FC Slavia Mozyr
- FC Torpedo Zhodino
- FC Transmash Mogilev
- FC Gomel
- FC Partizan Minsk
- FC Molodechno
- FC Neman Grodno
- FC Shakhtyor Soligorsk
- FC Zvezda-BGU Minsk

===== Defunct Belarusian football clubs =====
- FC Dinamo-93 Minsk
- FC Traktor Minsk

===== FC MTZ-RIPO =====
- FC Partizan Minsk
- Vladimir Romanov
- Traktor Stadium

FC MTZ-RIPO managers

- Alexandr Piskarev
- Yuri Puntus

==== Football venues in Belarus ====
- Atlant Stadium
- Central Stadium (Gomel)
- Dinamo-Yuni Stadium, Minsk, also named Darida Stadium
- Dinamo Stadium (Minsk)
- Football Manege (Minsk)
- Haradski Stadium, Barysaw
- Haradzki Stadium (Maladzechna)
- Luch Stadium
- Neman Stadium
- Dinamo Stadium (Brest)
- Spartak Stadium (Mogilev)
- Spartak Stadium (Babruysk)
- Stroitel Stadium, Soligorsk
- Tarpeda Stadium, Minsk
- Torpedo Stadium (Mahilyow)
- Torpedo Stadium (Zhodino)
- Traktor Stadium
- Transmash Stadium
- Vitebsky Central Sport Complex
- Yunost Stadium (Mozyr)
- Yunost Stadium (Smorgon)

==== Footballers in Belarus by club ====
===== FC MTZ-RIPO players =====
- Vyacheslav Hleb
- Artem Kontsevoy
- Hamlet Mkhitaryan
- Alyaksandr Sulima

=== Handball in Belarus ===
==== Belarusian handball clubs ====
- SKA Minsk

=== Ice hockey in Belarus ===
- Belarus Ice Hockey Federation
- Belarusian Hockey League

==== Belarusian ice hockey players ====
- Alexey Dmitriev
- Mikhail Grabovski
- Konstantin Koltsov
- Andrei Kostitsyn
- Sergei Kostitsyn
- Ruslan Salei

=== Belarus at the Olympics ===
- Belarus at the Olympics
- Belarus Olympic Committee
- Belarus at the 1994 Winter Olympics
- Belarus at the 1996 Summer Olympics
- Belarus at the 1998 Winter Olympics
- Belarus at the 2000 Summer Olympics
- Belarus at the 2004 Summer Olympics
- Belarus at the 2006 Winter Olympics

==== Olympic competitors for Belarus ====
- Magomed Aripgadjiev
- Nadzeya Astapchuk
- Igor Astapkovich
- Hanna Batsiushka
- Dmitry Debelka
- Lyudmila Gubkina
- Eduard Hämäläinen
- Dzimitry Hancharuk
- Konstantin Koltsov
- Yanina Karolchyk-Pravalinskaya
- Sergei Liakhovich
- Sergey Lishtvan
- Larissa Loukianenko
- Kanstantsin Lukashyk
- Vadzim Makhneu
- Sergei Martynov (sport shooter)
- Andrei Mikhnevich
- Natallia Mikhnevich
- Max Mirnyi
- Raman Piatrushenka
- Alena Popchanka
- Natallia Sazanovich
- Maryia Smaliachkova
- Sviatlana Sudak
- Ivan Tikhon
- Volha Tsander
- Valeriy Tsilent
- Ryta Turava
- Ilona Usovich
- Vladimir Voltchkov
- Irina Yatchenko
- Igor Zhelezovski
- Aliaksandr Zhukouski
- Viktar Zuyev

===== Olympic tennis players of Belarus =====
- Victoria Azarenka
- Max Mirnyi
- Natasha Zvereva

===== Olympic weightlifters of Belarus =====
- Leonid Taranenko

=== Belarusian sportspeople ===
==== Belarusian sportspeople in doping cases ====
- Vadim Devyatovskiy
- Ellina Zvereva

==== Belarusian archers ====
- Hanna Karasiova
- Anton Prylepau

==== Belarusian athletes ====
- Nadzeya Astapchuk
- Igor Astapkovich
- Svetlana Buraga
- Vadim Devyatovskiy
- Oksana Dragun
- Vladimir Dubrovshchik
- Natalya Dukhnova
- Lyudmila Gubkina
- Eduard Hämäläinen
- Dzimitry Hancharuk
- Vasiliy Kaptyukh
- Olga Kardopoltseva
- Yanina Karolchyk-Pravalinskaya
- Frants Kostyukevich
- Anna Kozak
- Dmitri Markov
- Andrei Mikhnevich
- Natallia Mikhnevich
- Yevgeniy Misyulya
- Gennadiy Moroz
- Yulia Nesterenko
- Alena Nevmerzhitskaya
- Aleksandr Potashov
- Natalya Safronnikova
- Natallia Sazanovich
- Natalya Shikolenko
- Tatyana Shikolenko
- Maryia Smaliachkova
- Natallia Solohub
- Sviatlana Sudak
- Ivan Tikhon
- Volha Tsander
- Valentina Tsybulskaya
- Alesia Turava
- Ryta Turava
- Ilona Usovich
- Irina Yatchenko
- Ellina Zvereva

==== Belarusian basketball players ====
- Ivan Edeshko
- Vladimir Veremeenko

==== Belarusian boxers ====
- Magomed Aripgadjiev
- Yuri Foreman
- Sergei Liakhovich

==== Belarusian canoers ====
- Aliaksei Abalmasau
- Aliaksandr Kurliandchyk
- Vadzim Makhneu
- Uladzimir Parfianovich
- Raman Piatrushenka
- Dzmitry Rabchanka
- Viktor Reneysky
- Dziamyan Turchyn
- Dzmitry Vaitsishkin
- Aliaksandr Zhukouski

==== Belarusian chess players ====
- Boris Gelfand
- Dawid Janowski
- Ratmir Kholmov
- Lev Polugaevsky

==== Belarusian figure skaters ====
- Tatiana Navka
- Julia Soldatova

==== Belarusian freestyle skiers ====
- Dmitri Dashinski

==== Belarusian gymnasts ====
- Svetlana Boginskaya
- Olga Korbut
- Marina Lobatch
- Larissa Loukianenko
- Yulia Raskina
- Vitaly Scherbo
- Inna Zhukova

==== Belarusian handball players ====
- Siarhei Rutenka

==== Belarusian martial artists ====
- Andrei Arlovski

===== Belarusian judoka =====
- Anatoly Laryukov

===== Belarusian kickboxers =====
- Alexey Ignashov

===== Belarusian mixed martial artists =====
- Andrei Arlovski
- Vladimir Matyushenko

==== Belarusian rowers ====
- Ekaterina Karsten

==== Belarusian sport shooters ====
- Kanstantsin Lukashyk
- Sergei Martynov (sport shooter)

==== Belarusian speed skaters ====
- Igor Zhelezovski

==== Belarusian sport wrestlers ====
- Dmitry Debelka
- Sergey Lishtvan
- Alexander Medved
- Aleksandr Pavlov
- Valeriy Tsilent

==== Belarusian swimmers ====
- Natalya Baranovskaya
- Alena Popchanka

==== Belarusian tennis players ====
- Victoria Azarenka
- Max Mirnyi
- Vladimir Voltchkov
- Anastasiya Yakimova
- Natasha Zvereva

==== Belarusian volleyball coaches ====
- Yuri Sapega

==== Belarusian weightlifters ====
- Hanna Batsiushka
- Andrei Rybakou
- Tatsiana Stukalava
- Leonid Taranenko

== Transport in Belarus ==
- Transport in Belarus
- Dnieper-Bug Canal
- Marshrutka
- State Committee of Aviation

=== Airlines of Belarus ===
- Belavia
- Template:Airlines of Belarus

=== Airports in Belarus ===
- Gomel Airport
- Minsk International Airport
- Minsk-1 Airport

=== Rail transport in Belarus ===
- Rail transport in Belarus
- Children's Railroad (Minsk)

==== Minsk Metro ====
- Minsk Metro
- Avtozavodskaya Line
- Borisovskiy Trakt
- Maskoŭskaja line
- Uruchie
- Vostok (Minsk Metro)

==== Railway stations in Belarus ====
- Minsk Terminal

=== Roads in Belarus ===
- European route E28
- European route E30

== Belarus stubs ==
- 1996 Belarus Referendum
- Academy of Public Administration under the aegis of the President of the Republic of Belarus
- Agriculture in Belarus
- Aleksandra and Konstantin
- Basovišča
- Batory Square
- BelAZ
- Belarus Ice Hockey Federation
- Belarus at the 1994 Winter Olympics
- Belarus at the 1996 Summer Olympics
- Belarus at the 1998 Winter Olympics
- Belarus at the 2006 Winter Paralympics
- Belarusfilm
- Belarusian Association of Journalists
- Belarusian Autocephalous Orthodox Church
- Belarusian Hockey League
- Belarusian State University
- Belarusian heraldry
- Belarusian resistance movement
- Belarusian rock
- Belarusian-American relations
- Boys and Girls (Angelica Agurbash song)
- Children's Railroad (Minsk)
- Committee for Standardization, Metrology and Certification of Belarus
- Communications in Belarus
- Dinamo Stadium (Minsk)
- Drazdy conflict
- Dreamlin
- Drobna drabnitsa (song)
- Electrokids
- Dinamo Minsk
- Belshina Bobruisk
- FC Darida Minsk District
- FC Dinamo Brest
- FC Dnepr Mogilev
- FC Gomel
- FC SKVICH Minsk
- FC Vitebsk
- FC Partizan Minsk
- FC Molodechno
- FC Naftan Novopolotsk
- FC Shakhtyor Soligorsk
- FC Slavia Mozyr
- FC Torpedo Zhodino
- FC Traktor Minsk
- FC Transmash Mogilev
- FC Zvezda-BGU Minsk
- Football Federation of Belarus
- Gomelavia
- Hinduism in Belarus
- House of Representatives of the Republic of Belarus
- State Security Agency of the Republic of Belarus
- KRIWI
- Khorovod
- Kirov Bridge
- Krama (band)
- List of museums in Belarus
- List of national parks of Belarus
- Meleshkovichi
- Ministry of Internal Affairs of Belarus
- Minsk Automobile Plant
- Minsk Terminal
- Minsk Tractor Works
- Miss Belarus
- Mum (Eurovision song)
- My Galileo
- National Assembly of the Republic of Belarus
- Our Lady of the Gate of Dawn
- Parason
- Presidential Guard (Belarus)
- Radio Stil (Belarus)
- Randomajestiq
- Republican Institute for Vocational Education
- Russian Colonialism
- SKA Minsk
- Shlomo Heiman
- Stadion Darida
- Supreme Court of Belarus
- Template:Belarus-stub
- The Wall (short stories)
- TransAVIAexport Airlines
- Ufocom
- Union of Poles in Belarus
- Volozhin yeshiva
- Zdrawneva

== See also ==
- Lists of country-related topics - similar lists for other countries
