= Music of Belarus =

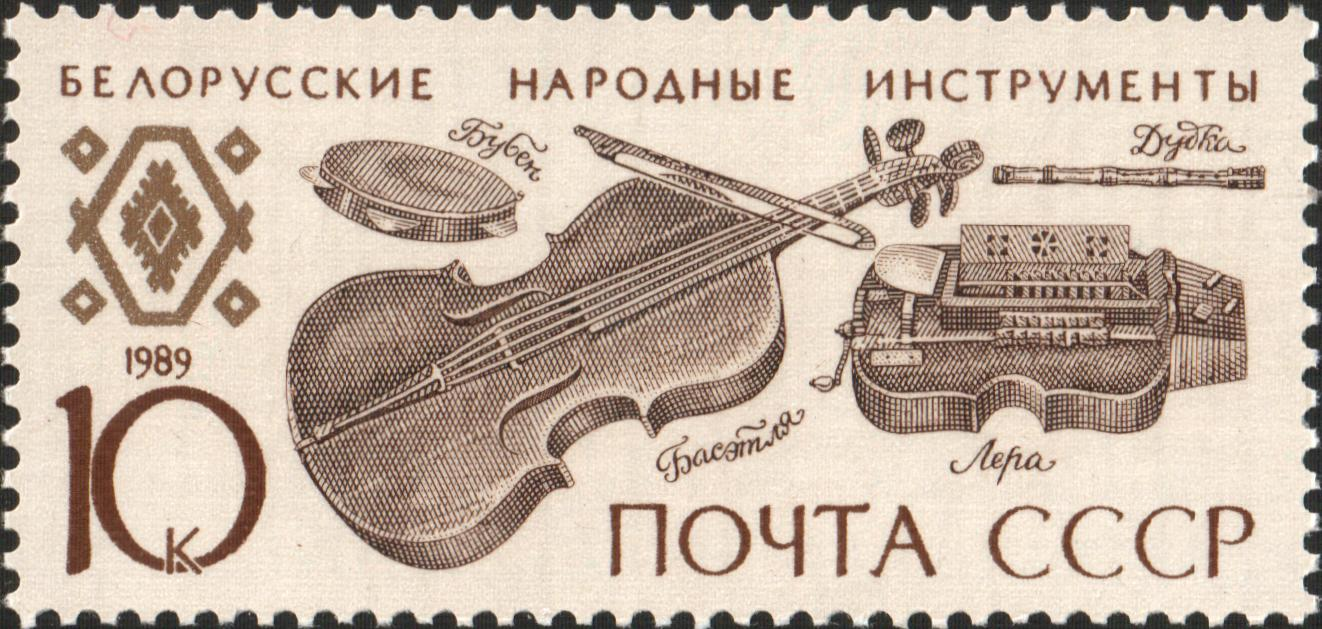
Soviet postage stamp depicting traditional musical instruments of Belarus

Belarus is an Eastern European country with a rich tradition of folk and religious music. The country's folk music traditions can be traced back to the times of the Grand Duchy of Lithuania. The country's musical traditions spread with its people to countries like Russia, Canada, United States, Kazakhstan and Latvia. The people of Belarus were exposed mostly to Russian pop music during this period and also after independence in 1991. In 2002, however, President Alexander Lukashenko has signed a decree requiring 50% of all FM broadcast music to be Belarusian in origin, and since 1 January 2005 the rule has been even stricter (75% of music broadcast each day must be Belarusian). However, it does not regulate the language of the songs, so most of the music which is broadcast is still in Russian.

Documentation of its music stretches back to at least the 15th century. Prior to that, skomorokhs were the major profession for musicians. A neumatic chant, called znamenny, from the word 'znamia', meaning sign or neume, used until the 16th century in Orthodox church music, followed by two hundreds of stylistic innovation that drew on the Renaissance and Protestant Reformation. In the 17th century, Partesnoe penie, part singing, became common for choruses, followed by private theaters established in cities like Minsk and Vitebsk.

== Music of Soviet Belarus ==
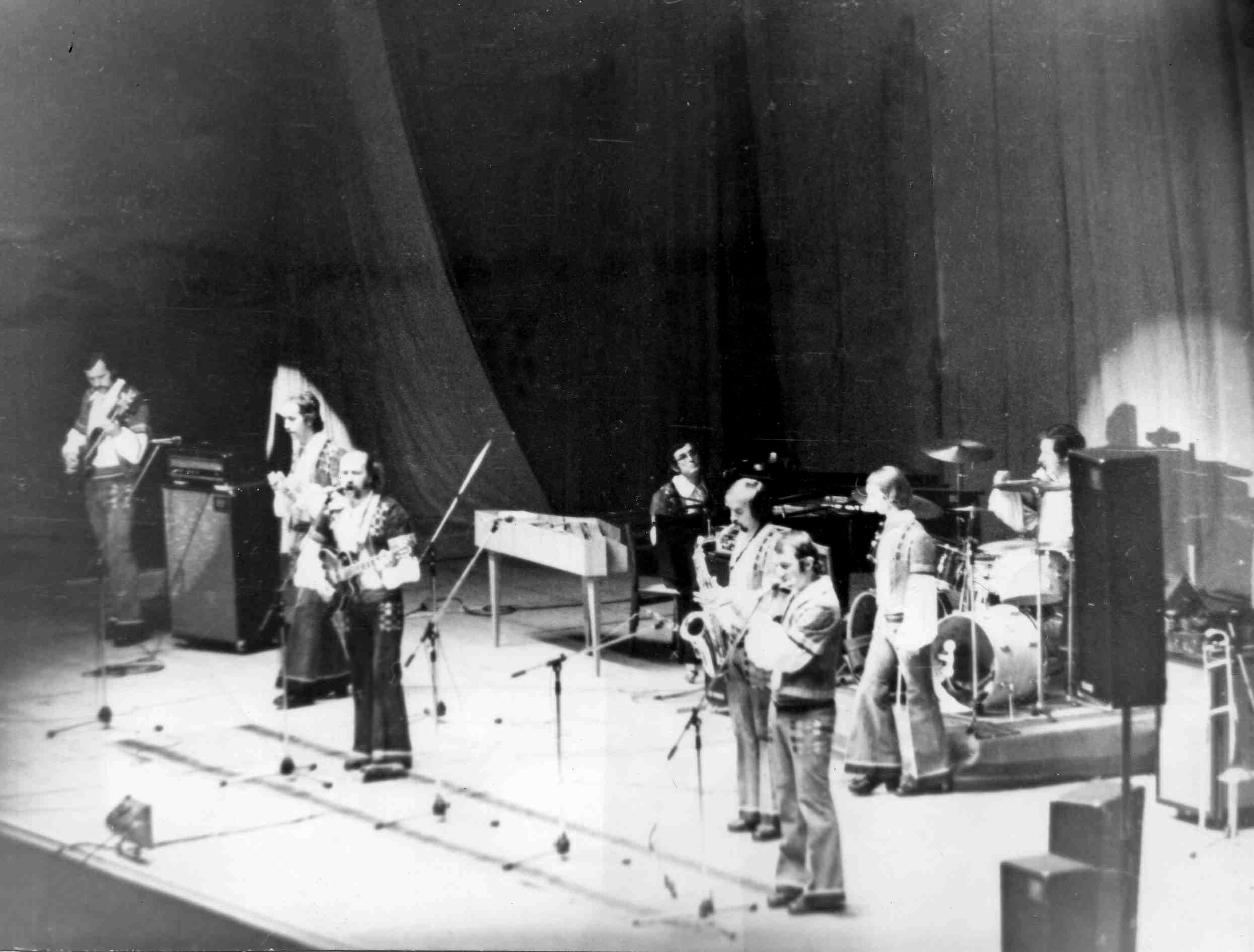
Soviet folk rock VIA Pesniary was one of the most popular Belarusian bands

In the 20th century, the first secondary education institute in Belarus was founded (1924) and the first operas. Popular Soviet Belarusian music was composed by several bands, many of whom performed Belarusian folk music. Folk rock act Pesniary, formed in 1969 by guitarist Vladimir Mulyavin, toured over Europe.

== Modern Belarus ==
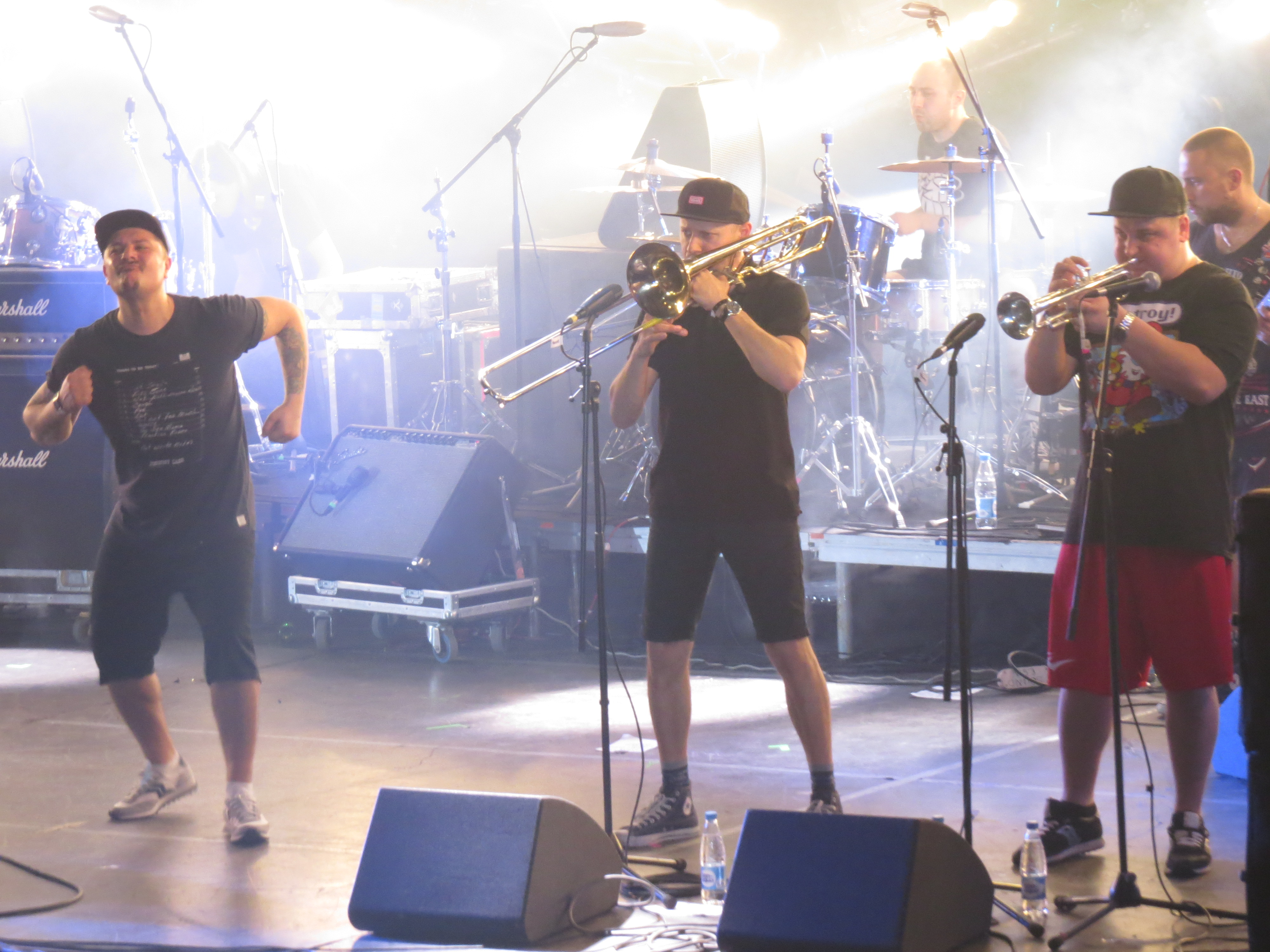
Ska punk band Lyapis Trubetskoy

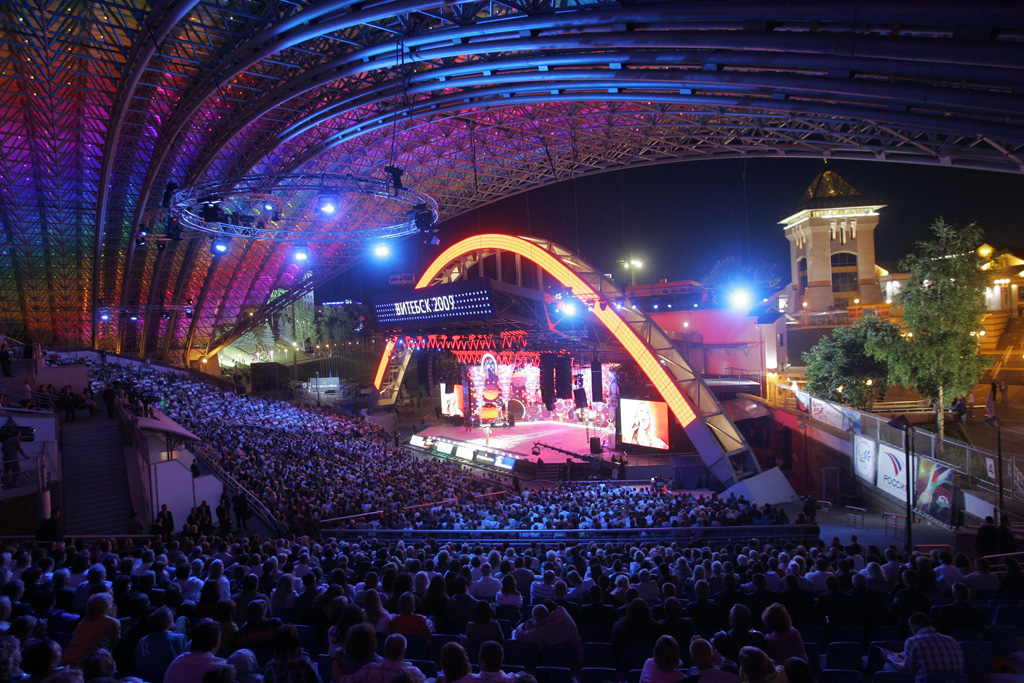
Opening ceremony of Slaviansky Bazar, largest pop music festival of Belarus, in 2009

Belarus gained independence after the fall of the Soviet Union and new bands appeared, including N.R.M. Modern pop stars include Boris Moiseev and Lyapis Trubetskoy (though they tend to orient themselves toward Russia and Russian speakers). Around 2002 a new generation of electronic bands appeared, including the groups like Randomajestiq, Dreamlin.

Rock music of Belarus arose in Perestroika times. Bands like Bi-2 (currently living in Russia), Lyapis Trubetskoy, were founded in the late 1980s or early 1990s. The Belarusian government has attempted to limit the amount of popular music aired on the radio, in favour of traditional music of Belarus. These restrictions have encouraged some Belarusian bands to sign up to Russian labels and to tour more in neighbouring countries.

The tradition of Belarus as a centre of folk and folk rock music is continued today by Stary Olsa, Bristeil and Kriwi, among others.

In 2003, Belarus took part in the Junior Eurovision Song Contest for the first time. Their participant, Volha Satsiuk, came in 4th place. In 2004 Belarus made it to the semifinals of the regular Eurovision Song Contest. The country was represented by a duo Aleksandra and Konstantin, who failed to reach the final. They won the Junior Eurovision Song Contest 2005 the following year, with Ksenia Sitnik's song, 'My Vmeste'.

The Belarusian authorities promote folk or "Slavic" music at the country's top musical event—the state-sponsored Slavianski Bazaar in Vitebsk, an annual pop and folk music festival in Vitebsk. The biggest festival of Belarusian rock music takes place outside of Belarus, in Gródek, northeastern Poland, a small town some 40 kilometers east of Białystok—the center of Podlaskie Voivodeship, which is inhabited by a 200,000-strong Belarusian minority. The festival, held in July every year since 1990, is organized by the Belarusian Union of Students (BAS) in Poland. The official name of the event is the Music Festival of Young Belarus or Basovišča.

== Patriotic songs and hymns ==
- Vajacki marš
- Mahutny Boža
- Pahonia (song)
