= Pukhavichy =

Pukhavichy (Puchavičy, Pukhovichi) may refer to:

- Pukhavichy, Minsk Region, an agrotown in Belarus
- Pukhavichy, Gomel Region, a village in Belarus
