= Doroshevich =

Doroshevich (Belarusian: Дарашэвіч; Russian: Дороше́вич) is the surname of:

- Mikhail Doroshevich
- Vlas Mikhailovich Doroshevich
