= Google.by =

Localised site for Google Search in Belarus

- Website type: Search engine
- Available in: Belarusian
- Owner: Google
- Creator: Google
- Website: www.google.by
- Commercial: yes
- Registration: no
- Launched: 2009
- Current status: active

Google.by is a localised site for Google Search in Belarus.

Prior to that, from 2003 to 2009, it was a domain/website owned by Belarusian web-development company ActiveMedia. The website looked almost exactly like Google homepage but had contextual advertisements on its right, one which always advertised the official website of ActiveMedia.

The website came up originally in 2003. Initially it had its own interface, totally different from Google, and its own search database which listed only a few thousand Belarusian sites. Later, the actual Google interface and logo were implemented. The fake interface has Russian and Belarusian versions, with Belarusian version having spelling errors ("У інтернэце" instead of "У інтэрнэце"). The search form then posted the search queries to an actual search application on google.com.

Despite the complex legal situation in Belarus, the Supreme Court of Belarus ruled in December 2008 the registration of the domain be cancelled. As a result, Google registered the domain in January 2009.

== See also ==
- .by
- Cybersquatting
