= Lyudmila Sukhnat =

Soviet-Belarusian communist politician

Lyudmila Konstantinovna Sukhnat (bel. Людміла Канстанцінаўна Сухнат, born July 22nd, 1938) was a Soviet–Belarusian teacher, member of communist party. Education Minister of BSSR (1985–1988). Honored Teacher of the Republic of Belarus.

== Biography ==
Graduated in 1960 from Minsk pedagogical university named after A.M.Gorky.
