= List of cities in the Grand Duchy of Lithuania =

Radziwiłł map from 1613. Also known as the Magni Ducatus Lithuaniae map, is a highly detailed and historically significant cartographic work featuring around 1020 settlements. These include cities, towns, villages, castles, and religious sites, depicted with varying iconography to indicate their size or importance.

There were many major cities in the Grand Duchy of Lithuania.

== Capitals (chronologically) ==
- Voruta (Hypothetical)
- Kernavė
- Trakai
- Vilnius

== Centers of voivodeships (since administrational reform) ==
- Lietuvos Brasta
- Minskas
- Mstislavlis
- Naugardukas
- Polockas
- Raseiniai
- Trakai
- Vilnius
- Vitebskas

== Other cities and towns ==
- Akmenė
- Alytus
- Anykščiai
- Birštonas
- Biržai
- Druskininkai
- Jonava
- Joniškis
- Jurbarkas
- Kaišiadorys
- Kaunas
- Kėdainiai
- Kelmė
- Klaipėda
- Kretinga
- Kupiškis
- Lazdijai
- Marijampolė
- Molėtai
- Pakruojis
- Palanga
- Panevėžys
- Pasvalys
- Plungė
- Prienai
- Radviliškis
- Raseiniai
- Rokiškis
- Skuodas
- Švenčionys
- Šakiai
- Šalčininkai
- Šiauliai
- Šilalė
- Šilutė
- Širvintos
- Tauragė
- Telšiai
- Trakai
- Ukmergė
- Utena
- Varėna
- Vilkaviškis
- Zarasai
- Gomelis
- Kijevas
- Černigovas
- Drogičinas
- Ivanava
- Kamianecas
- Kobrynas
- Luninecas
- Malaryta
- Pinskas
- Pružanai
- Ružanai
- Stolinas
- Brahinas
- Buda Kašaliova
- Čačerskas
- Choinikai
- Dobrušas
- Jelskas
- Lojevas
- Mozyrius
- Naroulia
- Petrykavas
- Rahačovas
- Rečyca
- Žlobinas
- Ašmena
- Astravas
- Yvija
- Lyda
- Mastai
- Ščiutinas
- Slanimas
- Smurgainys
- Svisločius
- Valkaviskas
- Zelva
- Mscislavas
- Bobruiskas
- Baltnyčia
- Bychavas
- Čavusai
- Čerykavas
- Chocimskas
- Drybinas
- Gorkai
- Gluskas
- Kostiukovičiai
- Kličavas
- Klimovičiai
- Krasnapolis
- Kruglajė
- Kričevas
- Šklovas
- Slauharadas
- Barysavas
- Berezinas
- Červenė
- Kaidanava
- Kapylius
- Kleckas
- Krupkos
- Logoiskas
- Molodečnas
- Medilas
- Nesvyžius
- Sluckas
- Smaliavičai
- Stolpcai
- Uzda
- Valažinas
- Vileika
- Bešenkovičai
- Breslauja
- Čašnikai
- Dokšica
- Dubrouna
- Gorodokas
- Glubokas
- Lepelis
- Liozna
- Mėrai
- Pastovys
- Rasonys
- Siena
- Talačynas
- Ušačai
- Drisa
- Orša
- David Gorodokas
- Pūkavičiai
- Pūkavičiai
- Turava
- Iziaslavas
- Žodinas

== See also ==
- Grand Duchy of Lithuania
- Subdivisions of Lithuania
