= Telecommunications in Belarus =

Telecommunications in Belarus involves the availability and use of electronic devices and services, such as the telephone, television, radio or computer, for the purpose of communication.

== Telephone system ==
- Telephone lines in use: 3,9741 million (2011).
- Mobile/cellular: 11,559,473 subscribers (Q1 2019).
- The phone calling code for Belarus is +375.

The Ministry of Telecommunications controls all telecommunications originating within the country through its carrier unitary enterprise, Beltelecom.

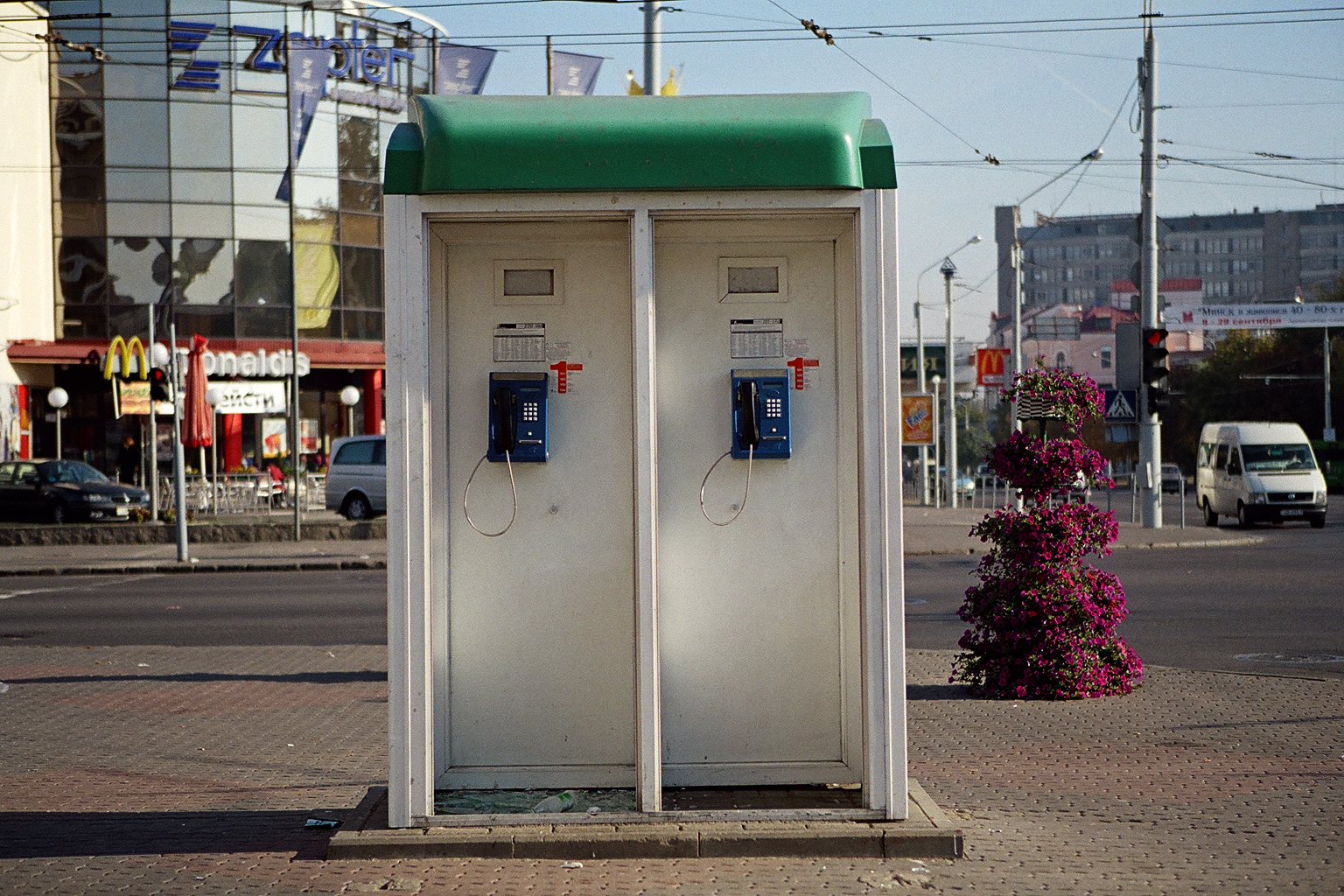
Telephone booths in Minsk, September 2007

Minsk has a digital metropolitan network; waiting lists for telephones are long; fixed line penetration is improving although rural areas continue to be underserved; intercity – Belarus has developed a fibre-optic backbone system presently serving at least 13 major cities (1998). Belarus's fibre optics form synchronous digital hierarchy rings through other countries' systems.

=== International connection ===
Belarus is a member of the Trans-European Line (TEL), Trans-Asia-Europe Fibre-Optic Line (TAE) and has access to the Trans-Siberia Line (TSL); three fibre-optic segments provide connectivity to Latvia, Poland, Russia, and Ukraine; worldwide service is available to Belarus through this infrastructure; Intelsat, Eutelsat, and Intersputnik earth stations.

In 2006 it was announced that Belarus and Russia completed the second broadband link between the two countries, the Yartsevo-Vitebsk cable. The capacity of this high speed terrestrial link which based on DWDM and STM technology is 400 Gbit/s with the ability to upgrade in the future.

=== Cellular communications ===
Belarus has 3 GSM/UMTS operators – A1, MTS, life:). For 4G data operators use the infrastructure managed by state operator beCloud, VoLTE service currently is offered only with A1.

== Radio and television ==
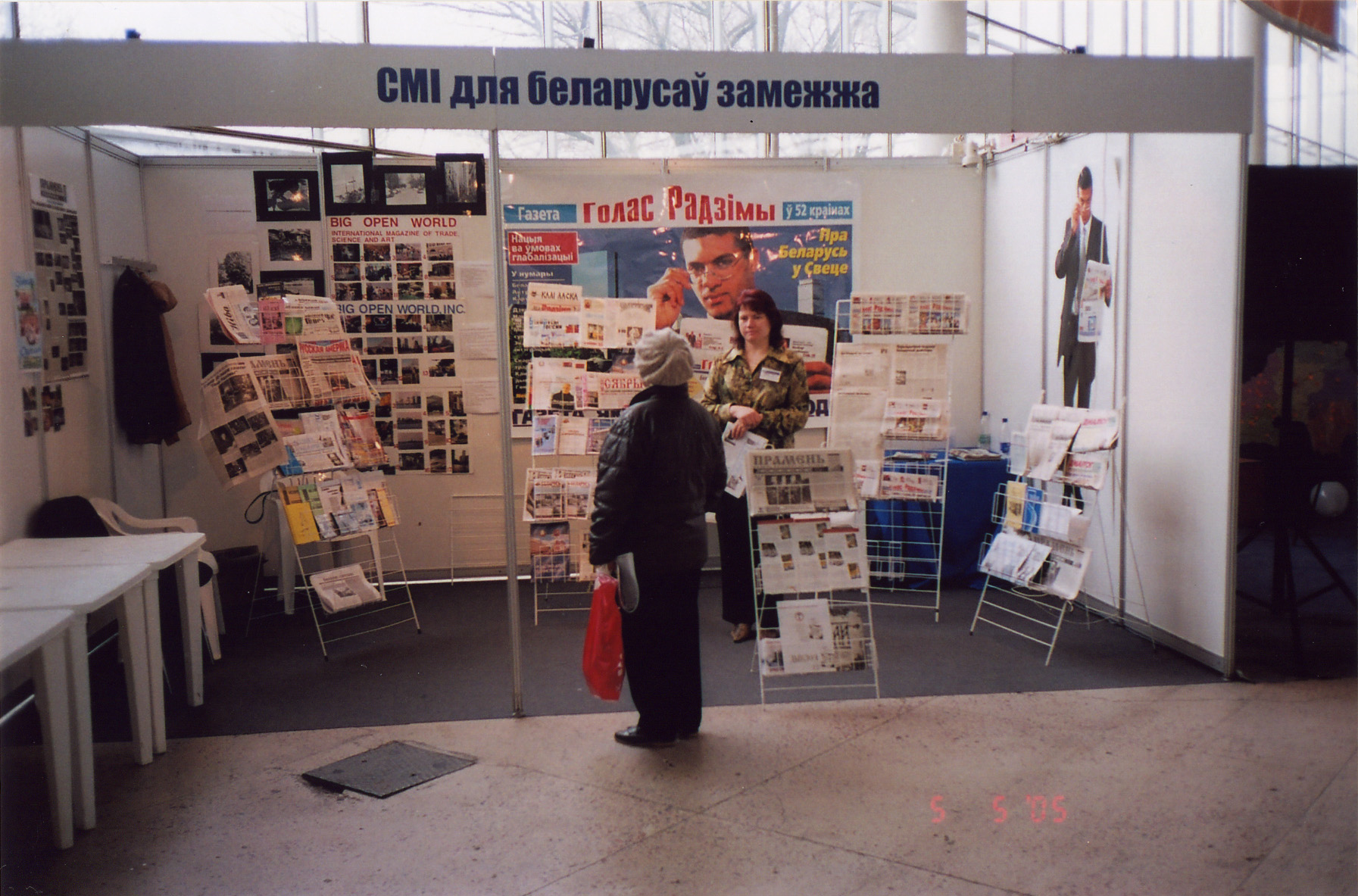
"Mass Media in Belarus" exhibition. "Mass Media for Diaspora" booth. 5 May 2005

- Television broadcast stations: 100 of which 59 are privately owned.

Belarus has switched from an analog to digital broadcast television. The process finished in May 2015. Belarus broadcasts according to the DVB-T2 standard with MPEG-4 compression.

- Radio broadcast stations: 173 with 24 privately owned, including 30 FM stations.
- Radios: 3.02 million (1997).

== Internet ==
- Country code: .by

The state telecom monopoly, Beltelecom, holds the exclusive interconnection with Internet providers outside of Belarus. Beltelecom owns all the backbone channels that linked to the Lattelecom, TEO LT, Tata Communications (former Teleglobe), Synterra, Rostelecom, Transtelekom and MTS ISP's. Beltelecom is the only operator licensed to provide commercial VoIP services in Belarus.

Until 2005–2006 broadband access (mostly using ADSL) was available only in a few major cities in Belarus. In Minsk there were a dozen privately owned ISP's and in some larger cities Beltelecom's broadband was available. Outside these cities the only options for Internet access were dial-up from Beltelecom or GPRS/cdma2000 from mobile operators. In 2006 Beltelecom introduced a new trademark, Byfly, for its ADSL access. As of 2008 Byfly was available in all administrative centres of Belarus. Other ISPs are expanding their broadband networks beyond Minsk as well.

Internet use:

- According to a 2006 survey of 1,500 adults by Satio, a third of Belarusians use the Internet—38% of the urban population and 16% of the rural population.
- A 2006 study by the United Nations Conference on Trade and Development indicates 56.5% of Belarus' population were internet-users.
- The International Telecommunication Union showed Internet penetration (Internet users per 100 population) in 2009 at 27% for Belarus, 42% for Serbia, 37% for Romania, 29% for Russia, and 17% for Ukraine.
- According to Internet World Stats, Internet penetration in June 2010 was 47.5%. For comparison, Internet penetration in Ukraine was 33.7%, in Romania 35.5%, Russia 42.8%, and Serbia 55.9%.

The most active Internet users in Belarus belong to the 17–22 age group (38 percent), followed by users in the 23–29 age group. Internet access in Belarus is predominantly urban, with 60 percent of users living in the capital Minsk. The profile of the average Internet user is male, university educated, living in the capital, and working in a state enterprise. The Ministry for Statistics and Analysis estimates that one in four families in Belarus owns a computer at home. The popularity of Internet cafés has fallen in recent years, as most users prefer to access the Internet from home or work. Russian is the most widely used language by Belarusians on the Internet, followed by Belarusian, English, and Polish.

In mid-2009 there were more than 22,300 Belarusian Web sites, of which roughly 13,500 domain names were registered with the top-level domain name ".by".

In June 2011 E-Belarus.org listed:

- 2 ISPs in the Brest region, 4 in the Gomel region, 1 in the Grodno region, 26 in the Minsk region, 1 in the Mogilev region, and 1 in the Vitebsk region
- 4 ADSL providers
- 3 technology parks
- 2 educational networks
- more than 30 Internet cafes and Wi-Fi Hotspots

== Censorship and media freedom ==
Many western human rights groups state that civil rights and free expression are severely limited in Belarus, though there are some individuals and groups that refuse to be controlled and some journalists have disappeared.

Because the Belarus government limits freedom of expression, several opposition media outlets are broadcast from nearby countries to help provide Belarusians an alternative points of view. This includes the Polish state-owned Belsat TV station and European Radio for Belarus (Eŭrapéjskaje Rádyjo dla Biełarúsi)

Reporters Without Borders ranked Belarus 157th out of 178 countries in its 2014 Press Freedom Index. By comparison, the same index ranked neighbor Ukraine, 126th and Russia, 148th.

In the 2011 Freedom House Freedom of the Press report, Belarus scored 92 on a scale from 10 (most free) to 99 (least free), because the government allegedly systematically curtails press freedom. This score placed Belarus 9th from the bottom of the 196 countries included in the report and earned the country a "Not Free" status.
