= Brest Airport =

Airport in Belarus

Brest International Airport Аэрапорт Брэст (Belarusian)
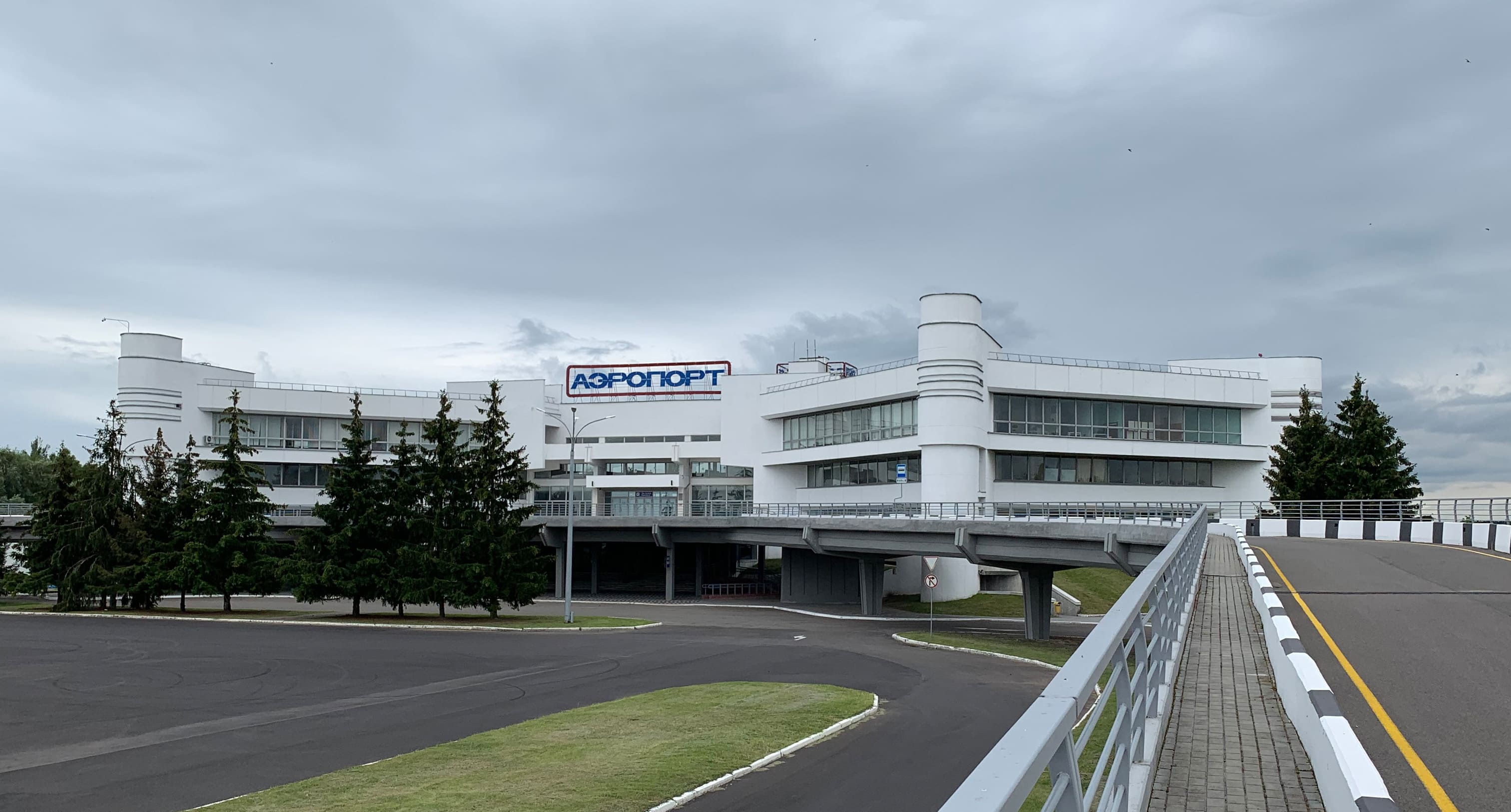
- IATA: BQT; ICAO: UMBB

Summary
- Airport type: Public
- Owner: Brest branch of the state enterprise Belaeronavigatsiya
- Operator: Government
- Serves: Brest
- Location: Brest, Brest Region , Belarus
- Opened: 1976
- Focus city for: Belavia
- Elevation AMSL: 468 ft (143 m)
- Coordinates: 52°06′30″N 023°53′53″E
- Website: https://www.ban.by/filialy/brest

Map
- Location of airport in Belarus

Runways
Direction	Length		Surface
Direction	m	ft	Surface
11/29	2,620	8,596	Asphalt
- Source: DAFIF

Brest International Airport (Belarusian: Аэрапорт Брэст, romanized: Aeraport Brest; Russian: Аэропорт Брест) is an international airport serving Brest, a city in Belarus. The airport is located 15 km east of the city center of Brest, situated between the village of Shebrin (to the south) and the M1 highway (to the north), part of the European route E30.

== Description ==
Currently, the airport in Brest is open for scheduled, charter, and cargo flights. Brest Airport is the largest airport in the Brest Region. Brest Airport is one of the seven international airports in Belarus.

Near the city of Brest lies the border of the European Union, and the city is one of the most important commercial hubs in Belarus.

Brest also serves as a gateway to the nearby city of Grodno, Belarus. Additionally, Brest marks the starting point of the Russian railway corridor connecting Western Europe with Asia.

The distance from the border crossings is as follows:

- Warsaw Bridge (automobile, passenger) – 20 km
- Kozlovichi (cargo) – 28 km

== History ==
The history of Brest Airport dates back to September 1945. By 1968, the old airport operated eleven scheduled flights daily. However, in the jet age, the old Brest Airport could only accommodate turboprop aircraft.

The construction of a new airport near Brest was decided in the early 1970s, with plans to build one of the most modern airport complexes in the USSR. Before 1976, the airport was located on the Kamieniec Highway.

The first phase of the airport was constructed in 1976. On July 30, 1976, the first jet-powered passenger aircraft, a Tupolev Tu-134A, landed at the new airport.

In 1985, over 100,000 passengers were dispatched from the airport, along with more than 700 tons of cargo and mail.

On 15 October 1986, the airport terminal complex was officially commissioned. Architects: V. Arsenyev, A. Lyashuk, V. Keskevich, R. Shilay and V. Gapyienko. The airport complex was designed to handle 400 passengers per hour and was equipped with a shop, restaurant, bar, and a canteen. This architectural achievement earned the prestigious State Prize of the Belarusian SSR in 1988. A new 3 km-long runway was built, along with the main infrastructure. For transit passengers and Aeroflot staff, there was the Mechta Hotel at the airport.

On July 3, 1987, the aircraft brand new Tu-154, landed in Brest, bringing 120 passengers from Moscow.

The peak of the airport's traffic came in 1990, when 340,000 passengers used its services. In 1991, Aeroflot opened its longest route: Brest-Chelyabinsk-Novosibirsk-Chita-Vladivostok.

During the time of the Soviet Union, air routes connected Brest with 15 cities across the USSR, including Moscow, Kyiv, Chișinău, Mineralnye Vody, Minsk, and Mogilev. Flights were operated by aircraft such as the AN-2, AN-24, Yak-40, and Tu-134.

=== Belarus ===
The first international flight on the Bangkok–Brest route, operated by a cargo Ilyushin Il-76, was carried out on December 21, 1990.

On May 19, 1993, Brest Airport was granted international status. In 1993, due to low profitability, eight passenger routes were discontinued, and the frequency of flights on the remaining routes was significantly reduced. The runway was reconstructed and is now capable of accommodating heavy-class aircraft such as the Boeing 737 and Ilyushin Il-86.

Despite a slight increase in passenger traffic, Brest Airport reported only 8,400 passengers in 2013.

In May 2017, the planned reconstruction of the runway (first phase) began, and it was completed in July 2018. During the reconstruction, the turnaround pockets at the ends of the runway were modified, increasing their size and changing their shape (from semicircular to trapezoidal). The asphalt-concrete surface was replaced, and its strength was increased. Additionally, the perimeter fence around the airport was completely replaced, and new lighting and signaling equipment from Siemens was installed (along the runway 290° course).

The second phase of reconstruction started in July 2018 and included the replacement of the asphalt-concrete surface at aircraft parking areas, the application of new runway and apron markings, partial reconstruction of the terminal complex, and the construction of new parking spaces for passengers and visitors. New ramps, a fuel tanker, and de-icing equipment for aircraft were also put into operation.

Brest Airport has not been accepting regular flights since 2019-2024, and there has been no charter tourist program since 2021-2024.

In 2024, Belavia launched a regular flight from Brest to Moscow (Russia), and in 2025, it started a service to Saint Petersburg (Russia).

From 2024 Belavia resumes seasonal charter flights to Antalya and in 2025 to Sharm El Sheikh.

== Facilities ==
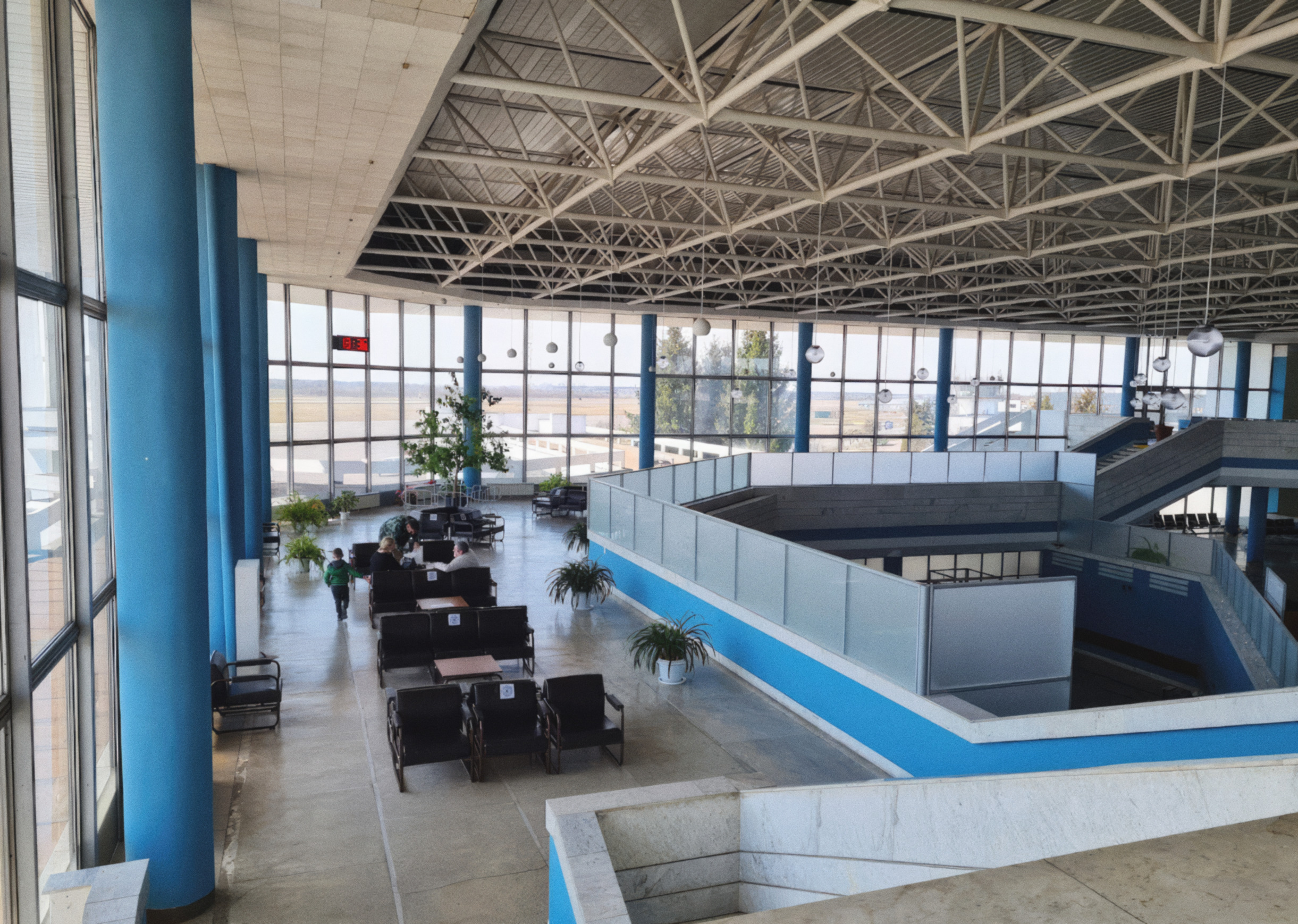
Terminal interior

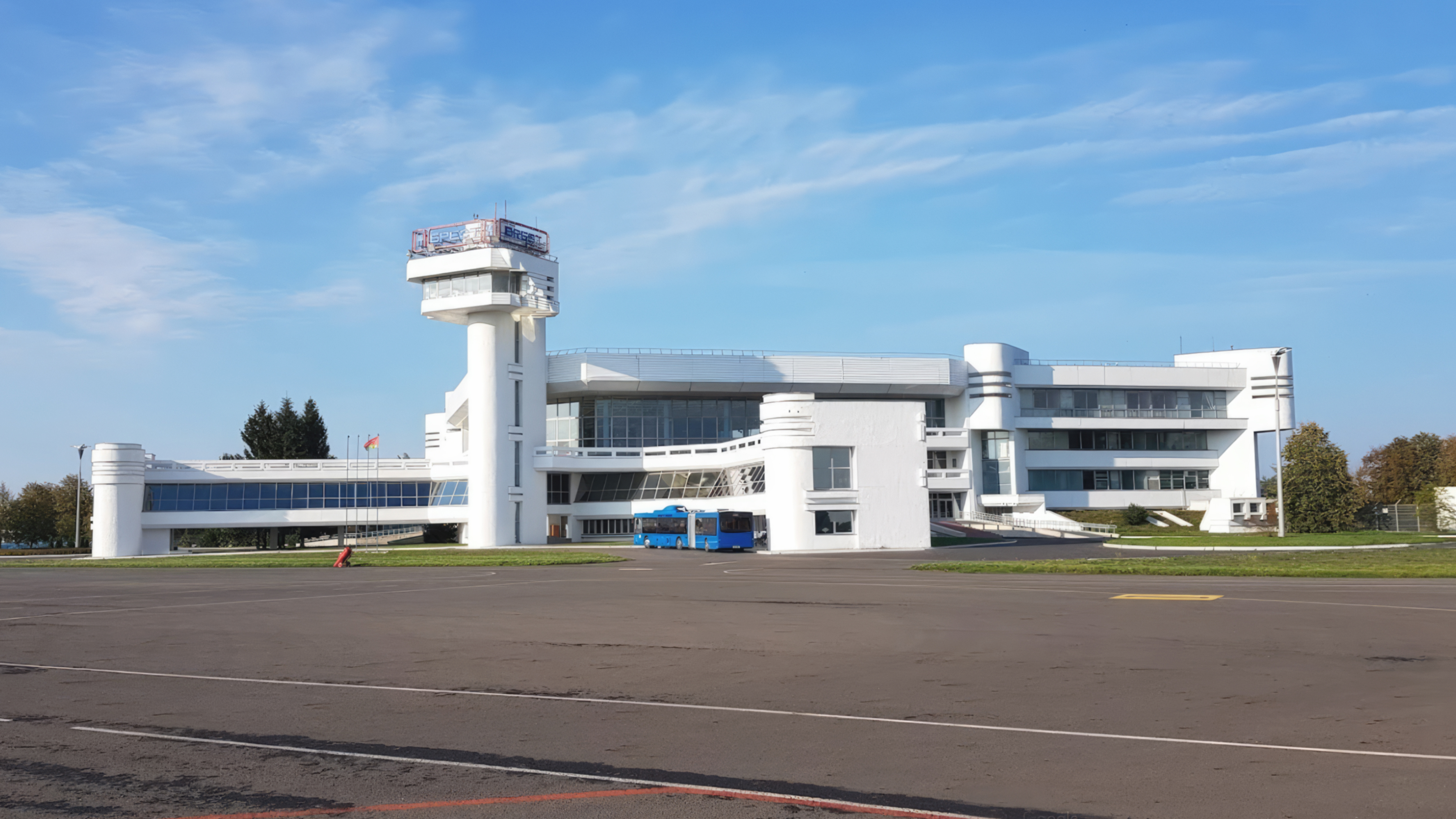
Terminal

The passenger terminal at the airport has a capacity of 400 passengers per hour. It consists of three square-shaped volumes connected to each other. The central volume houses the operating hall, covered by a metal structure, the second accommodates a restaurant and dining area, while the third includes administrative offices, a baggage department, a post office. The terminal also houses the border police, a health checkpoint, and customs. The building’s façades are distinguished by their pronounced plasticity and unique architectural and artistic composition.

Inside the terminal, there is a hotel for airline staff with 50 beds, currently available.

The terminal is part of the Belarusian free-trade zone Brest FEZ.

=== Runway ===
Brest Airport is currently equipped with an active Class B runway meeting ICAO Category I standards. The runway measures 2,620 m x 42 m and is equipped with a PAPI system.

The airport operates 24 hours a day and is equipped for the servicing, landing, and takeoff of various aircraft, including the Airbus A310-200/300, Antonov An-12, Antonov An-24, Antonov An-72, Antonov An-124, Boeing 737, Boeing 757-200, Boeing 767-200, Tupolev Tu-134, Tupolev Tu-154B/M, Ilyushin Il-76, Ilyushin Il-86, Ilyushin Il-96, Yakovlev Yak-40, and Yakovlev Yak-42.

The airport also features 10 parking stands covering a total area of 55,900 square meters. The airport has a temporary storage customs warehouse.

== Airlines and destinations ==
Airlines	Destinations
Belavia	Moscow–Sheremetyevo, Saint Petersburg; Seasonal charter: Antalya, El Alamein, Sharm El Sheikh

== Statistics ==
Passenger numbers
Year	Passengers
2013	8,400
2017	553
2018	4,197

== Media appearances ==
With very little and then no airline service, and with many empty spaces inside its terminal, Brest Airport was the setting of several movies for many years. In 2010, the airport's interiors caught the attention of Russian filmmakers, who shot several scenes of the movie Vysotsky. Thank You For Being Alive. Principal photography of the film A Dog Named Palma (2021) took place in Brest Airport. The local airport, which retained its Soviet interiors and was not very busy, was best suited to reproduce the atmosphere of the 1970s.

== See also ==
- List of the busiest airports in Europe
- List of the busiest airports in the former USSR
