= Committee for Standardization, Metrology and Certification of Belarus =

The Committee for Standardization, Metrology and Certification of Belarus (also known as Gosstandart) is the International Organization for Standardization (ISO) member body for Belarus.

The head of Gosstandart is the chairman, who is appointed by the President of Belarus. Since 1992, the post of chairman has been held by Valery Kareshkou.

Gosstandart's head office is located at 93 Starovilensky Tract 220053, Minsk.
