= Zdrawneva =

Village in Belarus

Coordinates: 55°19′12″N 30°20′14″E

Zdrawneva (Belarusian: Здраўнева; Russian: Здравнёво) was a manor house and estate in Belarus. It is located in the municipality of Ruba (Руба).

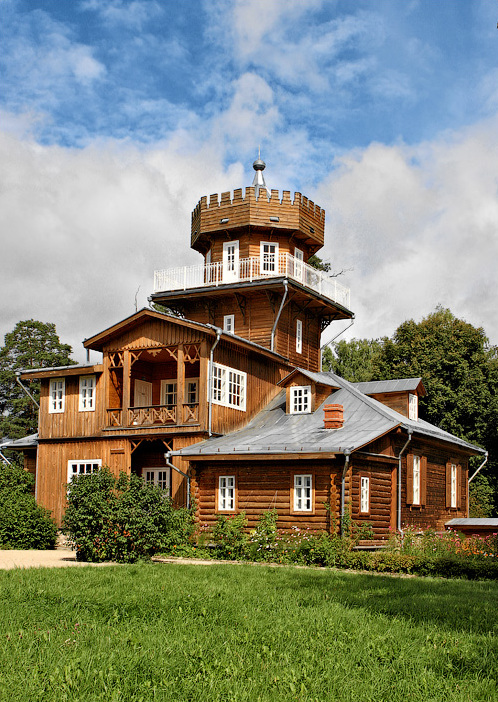
Repin's country house, "Zdrawneva", in Ruba, Belarus.

The Ilya Yefimovich Repin museum at the Zdravniovo estate was set up in 1988. It is situated in the mansion that used to belong to the 19th-century Ukrainian and Russian artist, Ilya Repin (16 km from Vitebsk, 2 km from the Minsk — St Petersburg Highway).

The father of the artist, Efim Repin, was buried in the nearby village of Sloboda. The museum contains numerous sketches, aquarelles, icons painted for Sloboda church, as well as photos, letters and books that used to belong to the artist.
