= Bellesrad =

Belarusian government agency

Bellesrad (Belarusian: Беллесрад), or the State Institution for Radiation Monitoring and Radiation Safety (Belarusian: Государственное учреждение радиационного контроля и радиационной безопасности «Беллесрад») is a Belarusian government agency. It is subordinated to the State Forestry Committee of the Council of Ministers of Republic of Belarus. It was created to address the impact of the Chernobyl disaster on Belarus. The agency combined with the State Institution for Forest Protection and Monitoring in 2014.

The institution monitors and investigates radioactive contamination, usage and rehabilitation of vegetation resources. It also controls radioactive contamination of food products.

In particular, Bellesrad posts warning signs and gives safety recommendations about wild plants and animals, such as mushrooms. It also oversees the breeding and monitoring of cattle and other agricultural practices in the Polesie State Radioecological Reserve.

== See also ==
- Chernobyl disaster effects
- List of Chernobyl-related articles
