= Ihar Hermianchuk =

Belarusian journalist and pro-democracy activist

Ihar Hermianchuk (other spellings: Hermyanchuk, Hiermianchuk; Ігар Гермянчук in Belarusian; January 1, 1961 – April 29, 2002) was a famous Belarusian journalist and political activist.

He was a chief editor of Belarus' most popular opposition newspaper in 1990s ("Svaboda", founded again as "Naviny" after being banned by Alexander Lukashenko, and again closed), served as a member of Belarus parliament (12th adjourning of the Supreme Soviet of BSSR), was a vehement supporter of Belarus' independence, a member of Belarusian Popular Front, a founder and an editor-in-chief of the "Kurjer" magazine.

He died from cancer in 2002.
