= Article 181 of the Criminal Code of Belarus =

Article 181 is an article of the criminal code of Belarus which forbids trafficking in people. Passed in 2001, the specific wording in Article 181 states that performing actions to "turning over or obtaining a dependent person" is considered human trafficking and deemed illegal. Article 181 is part of the Chapter of Belarusian law that list crimes against persons, freedom, honor and dignity.

== Punishments ==
If a person is found guilty of a "general offense" related to this article could be sentenced from a period of three months prison term and up to three years of probation or up to six years in prison with the option of the state seizing the property of the convicted.

If the persons that are being trafficked are considered minors under the law and/or involve a group of people to be sold as prostitutes or sex slaves, the punishment is increased to a prison term of five to ten years. People who are sold for their organs also face the five- to ten-year prison terms. Organized crime circles are also affected by this section, since the law targets both individuals and groups who deal with human trafficking.

If the person being trafficked suffers a physical injury that leads to serious health problems or death, the prison term is extended to eight or fifteen years.

== Text of the Law ==
1. Actions intended to sell or purchase or undertake other types of activities regarding turning over or obtaining a dependent person (trafficking of people), shall be subject to the arrest-up to three months; or to restriction of freedom-up to three years; or to imprisonment with the seizure of property or without-up to six years.
2. The same actions committed:
  - knowingly against a juvenile;
  - against two or more persons;
  - with the goal of sexploitation or other type of exploitation;
  - with the goal of using the victim's organs or tissue for purposes of transplantation;
  - by a group of people based on foregoing planning, or by an organized group;
  - by public official at the hand of power abuse shall be penalized by imprisonment for the term from 5 to 10 years with the seizure of property or without.
3. Aforementioned actions that carelessly caused the death or heavy bodily injury of a victim shall be subject to imprisonment for a term from 8 to 15 years with the seizure of property or without.
