= Logoisk crater =

- Location within Belarus
- Location: Lahojsk, Belarus; 54°12′N 27°48′E

Impact crater structure
- Confidence: Confirmed
- Diameter: 15 kilometres (9 mi)
- Age: Middle Eocene; 42.3 ± 1.1 Ma
- Exposed: No
- Drilled: Yes

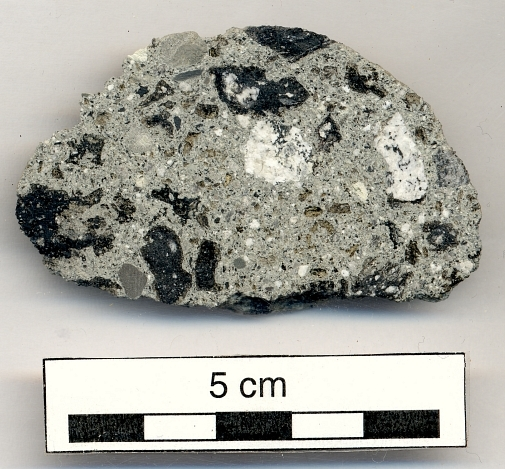
A suevite from the impact crater at Lahojsk, Belarus

Logoisk crater (Note: also Logoysk crater, Logoysk astrobleme, Logoisk impact structure, etc.) or Logoisk astrobleme is a meteorite impact crater in Belarus near the city of Lahoysk.

It is 15 kilometers (9.3 mi) in diameter and is estimated to be 42.3 ± 1.1 million years old (Eocene). The crater is not exposed at the surface.

The crater was discovered by an accident during a routine exploration drilling near the village of Kuzevichi in 1970s. A section was discovered with atypical materials in an unusual sequence: Quaternary deposits up to depth of 160m followed by a 230 meter thick layer of layered clays and lacustrine sediments followed by 240 meters of breccias, rocks previously unseen in the geology of Belarus. Three more drills made in 1976-1977 provided a clear evidence of the meteorite origin of the anomaly. Subsequent drillings mapped the crater. During the period of intensive research it was suggested that the crater may contain diamonds formed due high temperature and pressure of the impact, but this has not been confirmed.
