= Myalyeshkavichy =

Agrotown in Gomel Region, Belarus

Myalyeshkavichy Мялешкавічы (Belarusian)
- Agrotown
- Location within Belarus
- Coordinates: 51°55′02″N 28°59′03″E
- Country: Belarus
- Region: Gomel Region
- District: Mazyr District
- Time zone: UTC+3 (MSK)

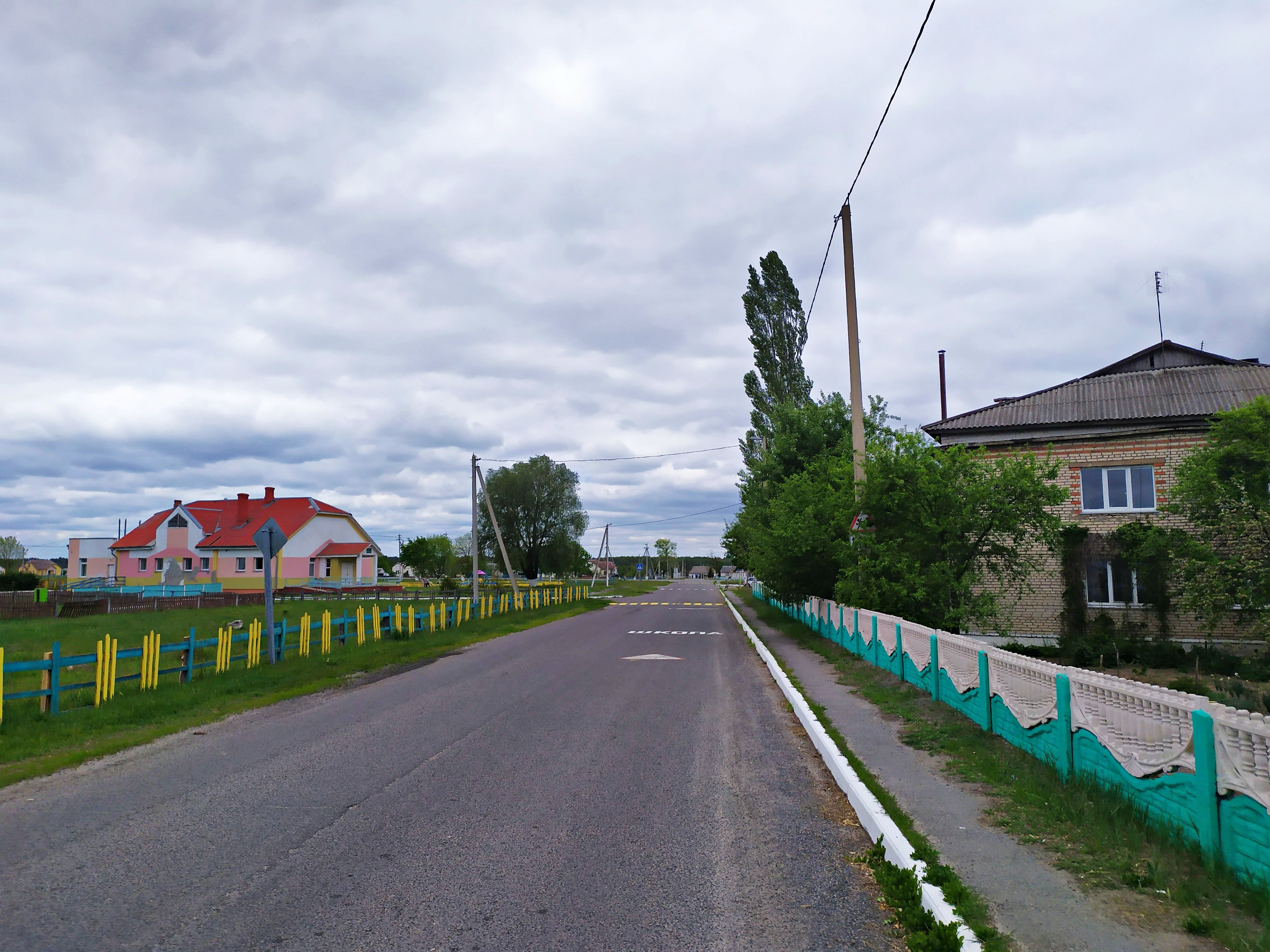
Meleshkavichy, Belarus

Myalyeshkavichy (Belarusian: Мялешкавічы, romanized: Mialieškavičy; Russian: Мелешковичи, romanized: Meleshkovichi) is an agrotown in Mazyr District, Gomel Region, Belarus. It is located 16 kilometres (10 mi) south-west of Mazyr. It is part of Kamyenka selsoviet.

As of the Russian Empire census of 1897, the population of Myalyeshkavichy was 1,329 people, of whom 127 were Jews.
