= Vladimir Yarets =

Belarusian motorcycle rider (1941–2021)

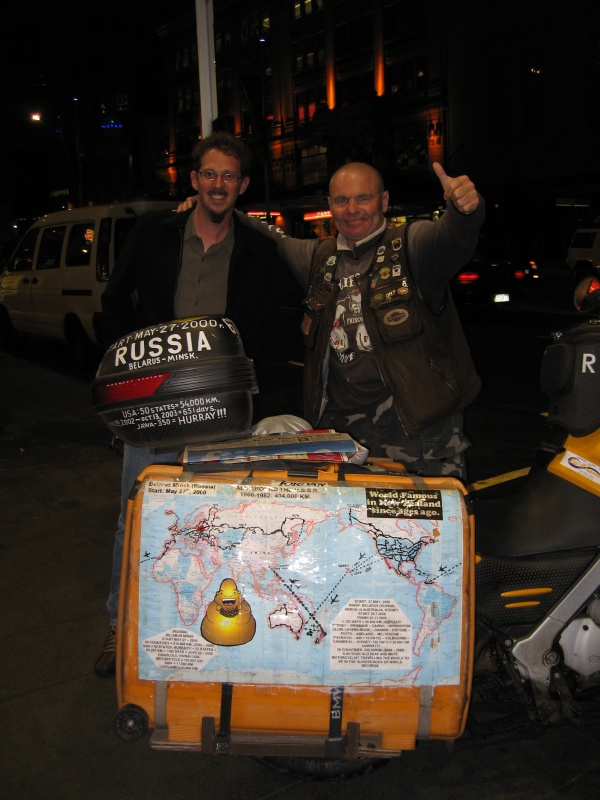
Vladimir Yarets (right) and David McNett (left) in Auckland, New Zealand 2007

Vladimir Yarets (Владимир Алексеевич Ярец; born May 5, 1941 – December 9, 2021) was round-the-world traveler from Belarus.

He was born in the then-Soviet republic of Belarus. In early childhood he became deaf from a blast during World War II. From childhood he had great aspiration for traveling. As a teenager he crossed the Soviet Union from Minsk to Magadan, covering about 36,000 kilometres (22,000 mi) in 148 days on a Jawa 50. Later he made many other trips around the Soviet Union on motorbike.

On May 27, 2000, he began his current round-the-world trip in Minsk, Belarus. He traveled around Europe, into north-west Africa to Western Sahara region to Morocco. Then he crossed the Atlantic Ocean from Spanish Canary Islands into Venezuela. He traveled many Latin America countries until he reached United States. By late 2005 he had visited every state of United States of America including Hawaii and Alaska and every Canadian province.

In the city Peoria in Illinois he was hit by a truck while stopping at the side of a road in October 2003. He had 29 fractures and spent two months in hospital and several more months recovering at the place of local friends. His 1990 Jawa 350 motorcycle was a write-off, the US biker community banded together to help him, and the local BMW dealership gave him a new BMW F650GS motorcycle as a gift to continue his travels.

At end of 2006, he was in Sydney, Australia, after circumnavigating the Australian continent as well as a 3000 km detour to the Red Centre and touring Tasmania. Vladimir was met by members of the RMOA Australia and presented a custom silver "Round the World" ring.

He then shipped to New Zealand and then to Hong Kong. He also indicated he wishes to travel to Japan and mainland China.

Yarets enjoys meeting people, "talking" to everyone he meets and showing them pictures of his travels, and he is especially proud of his X-rays.

In 2009 it was reported he had covered more than 100,000 miles (160,000 km); in 2010 it was reported that he had covered 740,000 kilometres (460,000 mi) on his travels through 138 countries.

Yarets arrived in the southernmost city of Japan, Ishigaki (located on Ishigaki Island), on November 6, 2010.

Vladimir Yarets died on December 9, 2021, at the age of 80.
