= Hinduism in Belarus =

Hinduism in Belarus has a very small following. There are three main Hindu groups in the country: ISKCON, Brahmakumaris and The Light of Kailasa. ISKCON is under severe pressure from Alexander Lukashenko's government, and The Light of Kailasa is banned altogether.

== Indians in Belarus ==
There are more than 1000 Indians in Belarus.

== Hare Krishnas in Belarus ==
"Hare Krishnas" are followers of the Hindu religion, members of Vaishnavism. ISKCON has six registered communities in Belarus in the cities of Gomel, Grodno, Minsk and Vitebsk.

In 2003, activists of Belarusian branch of ISKCON issued a statement against defamation of their religion in Belarusian school textbook on Humanities (textbooks are approved and published by the government). ISKCON were accused of fooling the believers (an offensive word "making-blockhead" was used in the textbook), and it was stated that Krishnaite believers need a psychiatrist assistance to return to "real life".

The Belarus government continued to use textbooks that promote religious intolerance towards Hare Krishna. The Ministry of Education continued to use the textbook Man, Society, and State, which labels Protestants and Hare Krishnas as sects, despite protests by religious groups.

== The Light of Kailasa ==
"Light of Kailasa" are followers of the Hindu religion, members of the Shaivism. It is not registered in Belarus.

== Brahma Kumaris in Belarus ==
Brahma Kumaris have two centres in Belarus.

- Main Centre: Centre Brahma Kumaris, 56 Vostochnaya street, Flat No. 176, Minsk 220113
- Centre 2: Centre Brahma Kumaris, 10 Shevchenko boulevard, Flat No. 1, Brest 224013

== Atrocities and persecution ==
=== Against ISKCON members ===
The 1000-member Minsk Community of Krishna Consciousness (the Hare Krishnas) faced closure for meeting at, and attempting to register, a property it owned. Local authorities refused to register the Hare Krishnas at a building they purchased in 1990 and had used as a place of worship, claiming the building was zoned only for residential use.

Since 2004 the Hare Krishnas had received six warnings from local authorities for meeting at a building where it was not registered. The Minsk community appealed to the UN Commission on Human Rights (UNCHR), thus hindering the local government's ability to close the community. In August 2005 UNCHR recommended that the authorities "restore rights" to the community within 90 days. At the end of the period covered by this report, the authorities had not complied with UNCHR's recommendation. The Minsk Community of Krishna Consciousness found several legal addresses to rent, but the landlords rescinded their offers after they were pressured by authorities. The community found another legal address and submitted the registration documents, but the authorities denied registration.

Authorities harassed, fined, and detained Hare Krishnas for illegally distributing religious literature. Since Minsk city authorities repeatedly denied requests by Hare Krishnas for permission to distribute religious materials in the city, the group decided to stop distribution.

In 2016, ISKCON activist in Homiel was fined for outdoor religious activity. According to Human Rights Watch, arbitrary arrests of ISKCON activists and other Hinduists are regular.

In July 2021, Belarusian authorities launched an attack on non-governmental organizations, and among NGOs forcibly closed by Ministry of justice was "Vedanta vada" (Russian: Веданта вада) Hinduist cultural and educational organization. "Vedanta Vada — Hare Krishna in Mahilioŭ" group was active in promoting Indian culture and religion.

=== Against "Light of Kailasha" ===
On July 13, 2002, police detained in one of the Minsk parks 17 members of the Belarusian spiritual community "Light of Kailasa", accusing them of holding an unsanctioned procession and meeting. The seven men and five women were among 17 arrested Saturday evening while singing Hindu songs and hymns in a Belarusian park.

The 12 Hindus, all citizens of Belarus, began their hunger strike while waiting in a police processing facility, where they were being held until their appearance in court. Officials at the processing center confirmed that the group had begun a hunger strike and said that a court hearing would be held soon.

Hindus oppose a bill passed by the lower house of parliament prohibiting religious groups with less than 20 years' presence in Belarus from publishing literature or establishing missions and banning organized prayer by denominations with less than 20 Belarusian citizens.

The group unsuccessfully tried to register before the new more restrictive religion law came into force in November 2002.

On 1 June 2003 four armed police officers broke up an evening ritual and meditation held at a private flat in the capital Minsk by approximately six members of the Light of Kaylasa Hindu community, the group's leader Natalya Solovyova told Forum 18 News Service on 7 June. The raid came exactly a week after a similar Hindu meditation meeting was broken up elsewhere in the city. Forum 18 tried to find out why these Hindu meetings have been raided by police, but on 9 June the telephone of Alla Ryabitseva, the head of Minsk City Council's Department for Religious and Ethnic Affairs, went unanswered. Contacted by Forum 18 the same day, Aleksandr Kalinov at the Belarusian State Committee for Religious and Ethnic Affairs said that his department had no documents on the Minsk Hindu community.
