= Republic (Belarus) =

Republic (Respublika) is a parliamentary group in Belarus which opposes the administration of President Alexander Lukashenko. In legislative elections held between October 13–17, 2004, the group did not secure any seats. They have been largely inactive since.
