= Pavel Kastusik =

Belarusian artist (born 1976)

Pavel Kastusik (Belarusian: Павел Кастусік, born in Minsk, 1976) is a Belarusian artist, whose works range from oil paintings to graphic arts.
