= Skirmunt =

Skirmunt is a surname derived from the Polish language given name of the Lithuanian given name Skirmantas. It belongs to two noble Skirmunt families. Notable people with the surname include:

- Helena Skirmunt (1827–1874), Polish painter
- Konstanty Skirmunt (1866–1949), Polish politician
- Raman Skirmunt (1868–1939), Belarusian and Polesian statesman
