= Brest FEZ =

Free economic zone in Brest, Belarus

The Brest Free Economic Zone was created in Brest, the gateway city at the border of Belarus and Poland in 1996. It has been a crossroads for trade and transit for centuries. Now it is a primary transit hub in Belarus. The Brest Free Economic Zone covers the total area of 71 km^{2}, comprising 3 big sites. The biggest site is located in a northern suburb of Brest, bordered by Poland to the west. The site is intersected by a motorway with heavy freight traffic from Europe to Russia. Here the border crossing “Kozlovichi-Kukuryki”, the biggest crossing point at the border of the EU and the CIS, is handling exclusively freight traffic day and night. An international airport handles and services even heavy aircraft.

Trains are transferred to the European gauge rails in Brest. There is a river port in Brest, and the cargoes reloaded here onto river vessels can travel further on along the waterway that includes the Dnieper-Bug Canal, as far as the Black Sea ports.
