= Republican Institute for Vocational Education =

University in Minsk, Belarus

Coordinates: 53°53′54″N 27°32′22″E

Republican Institute for Vocational Education
Motto
Established	1992
Location	Minsk, Belarus
Students	2250 total
Homepage	http://ripo.unibel.by/

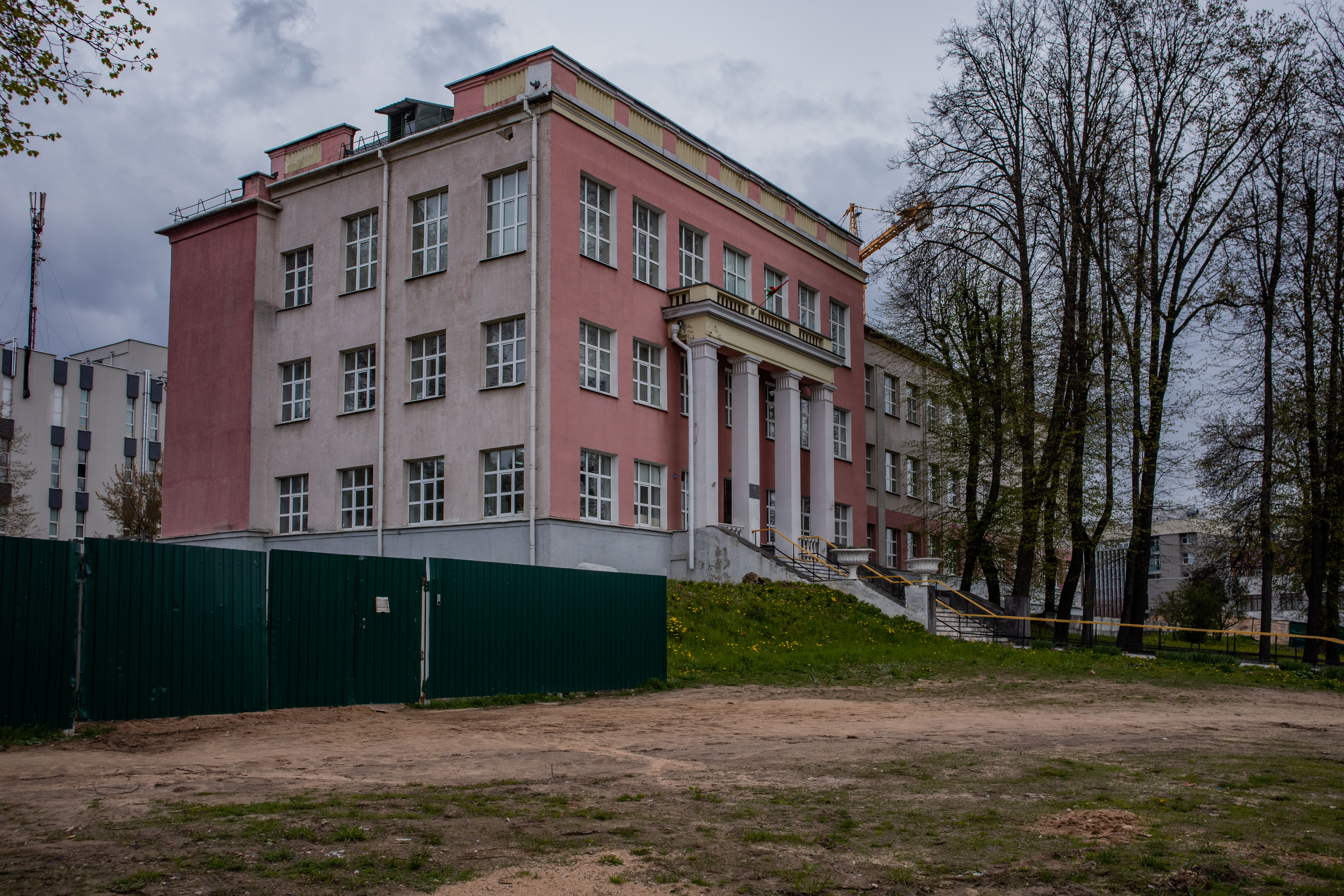
Main building in Minsk

The Republican Institute for Vocational Education (Belarusian: Рэспубліканскі інстытут прафесійнай адукацыі, romanized: Respublikanski instytut prafiesijnaj adukacyi, RIPA or RIPO, Russian: Республиканский институт профессионального образования) is a higher education institution in Minsk, Belarus. Founded in December 1992, it is managed by the Ministry of Education of the Republic of Belarus.

== Structure ==
More than 200 employees work in this institute.

- 3 science-methodological centres
- 8 departments in the Faculty of Improvement of Skills
- centre for economic education, created with support of Germany.
