= Niamiha =

Niamiha or Nemiga may refer to:

- Niamiha River, Minsk, Belarus
- Niamiha Street, Minsk, Belarus
- Nemiga (Minsk Metro)
