= Kozlovichi Mental Asylum =

Mental asylum in Belarus

Kozlovichi Mental Asylum was an institution for the mentally ill in Randilovshchina, near Kozlovichi, Grodno Province, Belarus. The wooden construction housing the building was built in 1905 and destroyed by fire on October 12, 2003. The fire killed thirty patients.

== Fire ==
Although President Alexander Lukashenko's spokeswoman, Natalya Petkevich, said that a patient (among those who died in the fire), described as a pyromaniac who had twice previously tried to set fire to the building, was responsible for the blaze, government investigators were also looking into staff carelessness as a possible cause. Staff members, some of whom had been sleeping in a separate building on the campus, apparently tried to put the fire out and rescue patients themselves, waiting to call the fire department.
