= Śvisłač (disambiguation) =

Svislach or Śvislač, is the administrative center of Svislach Raion, Grodno Region, Belarus.

Svislach or Śvislač, may also refer to the following places in Belarus:

- Svislach, Pukhavichy District, an urban-type settlement in Minsk Region, Belarus
- Svislach, Mogilev Region, an agrotown in Mogilev Region, Belarus
- Svislach (Berezina), a river in central Belarus, a tributary of Berezina
- Svislach (Neman), a river in western Belarus, a tributary of Neman
