= List of places in Belarus =

This is a list of places in Belarus. At the higher administrative level, Belarus is divided into 6 voblastsi (usually translated as regions or provinces) and one municipality (horad, i.e., "city"); the latter one is a special status of the capital of Belarus.

- Minsk, the municipality
- Brest Region (Brest)
- Gomel Region (Gomel)
- Grodno Region (Grodno)
- Mogilev Region (Mogilev)
- Minsk Region (Minsk)
- Vitebsk Region (Vitebsk)
- List of cities in Belarus
