= Randomajestiq =

- Origin: Belarus
- Genres: Electronic; Techno; House; Chillout; Alternative dance
- Years active: 1993-2025
- Labels: Gizmo Lab, Collaps
- Members: Vladimir Hropov
- Website: Official Website

Randomajestiq was a music project of musician Vladimir Hropov (Russian: Владимир Хропов) (1976 - 9.19.2025) from Gomel City, Belarus.

Hropov, was born 1976, he is a sound designer, composer and producer. In 1993 he started composing chiptunes on the AY-3-8910 fm-synth chip. With this experience with the Tracker software, he then moved to more advanced PC and current production technologies to experiment with recorded sounds and synthesis. Today Randomajestiq produces music in almost all genres of electronic music.

Vladimir died of liver disease on September 19, 2025.
