= Kriwi (band) =

Belarusian folk rock band

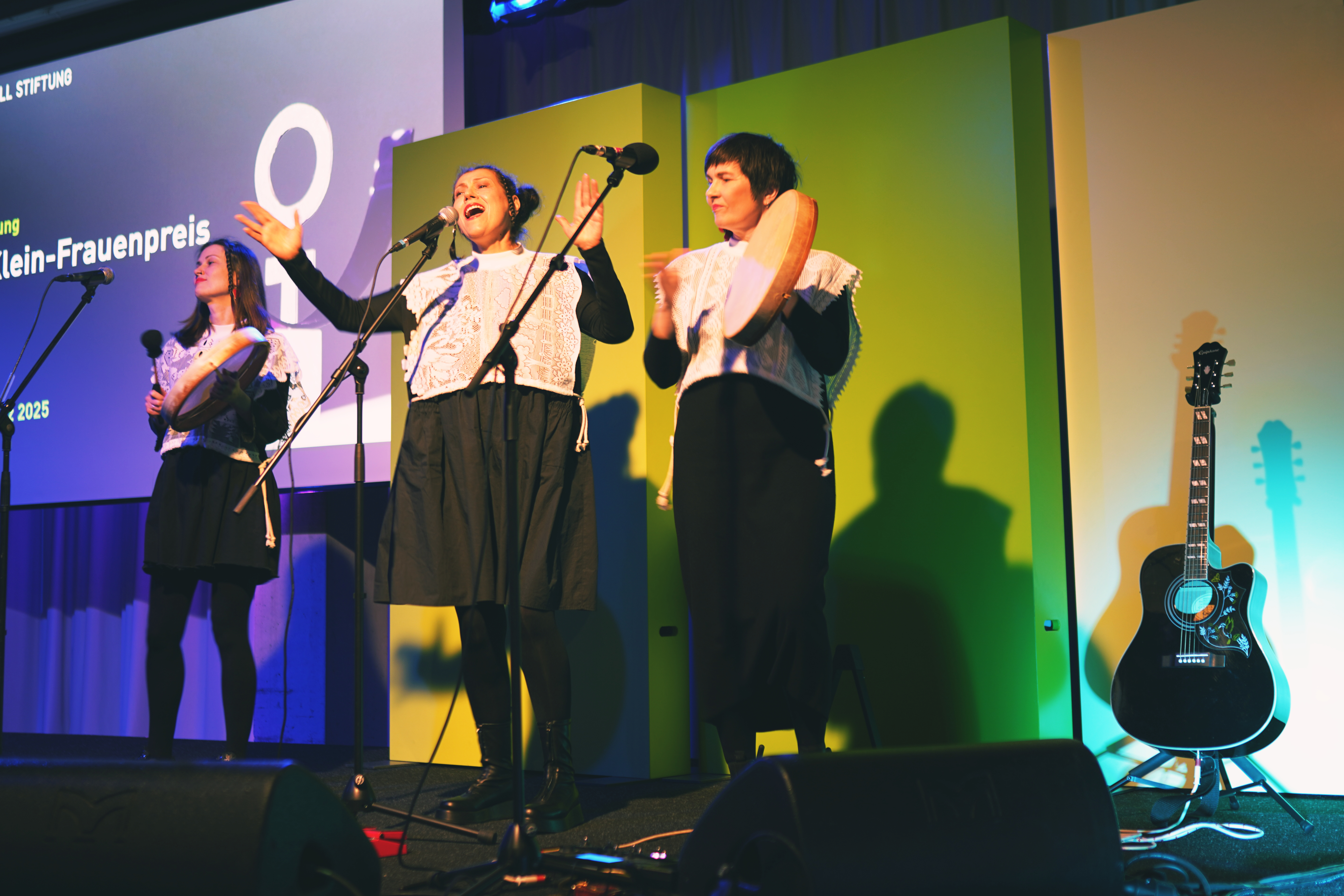
Kriwi in 2025

Kriwi is a Belarusian newFolk and clubEthno band. The band name means "a person belonging to the East Slavic tribe of Kryvians". Kriwi uses a variety of European folk instruments (zurna, balalaika, hurdy-gurdy, bagpipes, cimbalom, flutes, reeds, and percussion) and blending these with modern technology of synthesizer and samples, video-WJ InterFilmWostok and with vocals of Veranika Kruhlova.Since 1996- producing: Waléra Kanischtscheff (machno) Berlin, X-Berg

== Discography ==
=== Studio albums ===
- Kriwi made in Belpunkt (1996)
- Hej-Loli (1997)
- Musica Vitale Di Grine Kuzine-Kriwi-Zollitsc (2000)
- Minsk-Berlin (2002)
- Live in Berlin (2004)
- KRIWI Live — homevideo (2005)
- InterFilmWostok fest — KRIWIvideo concert minsk (2006)
- Traukamurauka (2013)
- Pojdsem (2020)
- Kriwi-InterFilmWostok compilation (2022)

=== Singles ===
- KRIWI (2000)
- KRIWI (2008)

=== Soundtrack ===
- Fresh with Fireworks (2001)

== Literature ==
- Dmitry Podberezsky. Encyclopedia of Belarusian Popular Music (2008). pp. 152–153. ISBN 978-985-6783-42-8
