= Pukhavichy, Gomel region =

Village in Belarus

Coordinates: 52°23′N 27°58′E

Pukhavichy is a village in Zhytkavichy district, Gomel Region, Belarus, part of Chyrvonensky Selsoviet (Chyrvonensky Rural District).
