= Honored Teacher of the Republic of Belarus =

Honored Teacher of the Republic of Belarus (Russian: Заслуженный учитель Республики Беларусь) is one of many official titles presented by the Government of Belarus. The purpose of the award is to honor teachers at all educational levels for their work in educating the youth of Belarus. The title was created by decree in 1995 and is awarded with a badge and a diploma.

== History ==
The title was a carry over from the Soviet era, where citizens of various professions were honored by the national and subnational governments for their long contributions to a specific field or to the nation. When it was part of the Soviet Union as Byelorussia SSR, had titles of their own to award their citizens. One those titles was "Honored Educator of the Byelorussia SSR" (Russian: Заслуженный учитель БССР). When Belarus left the Soviet Union in 1991, the awarding of the title was scrapped. The return of the title, with its present name, occurred with the passage of Resolution N 3726-XII, titled "System of State Awards for the Republic of Belarus," on April 13, 1995.

== Criteria ==
To qualify for the award, a Belarusian teacher must have been teachering for fifteen or more years and the quality of the education must be above the normal standards required by the state. The teacher can be from any level of schooling and from any type of school, regardless if it is owned by the state or by private institutions. Home school teachers can also qualify for the award.

== Badge ==
The medallion at the bottom of the badge consists of an oak wreath and a shield. On the shield, the rank of "Honored Teacher" is written in Russian. At the top part of the badge, a metal plate is inscribed with the name of the country in Russian. The a red ribbon is placed about the plate. The top plate is 20x18 millimeters and the bottom medallion is 24 mm in diameter.
