= Mikhail Doroshevich =

Belarusian blogger and human rights activist

Mikhail Doroshevich (Belarusian language: Міхаіл Дарашэвіч) is a founder of e-belarus.ORG, a Minsk-based news and analytical site covering developments in ICT in Belarus and Information Policy Blog, which provides daily news about information policy. DoWire.org Democracies Online features him as one of the most notable human rights bloggers on the Internet. Mr. Doroshevich is a frequent contributor to Internet periodicals about technology and freedom in Eastern Europe.

Doroshevich influenced the 2005 Belarus government policy change allowing Wi-Fi access. He advocates for communications technology freedom and related human rights issues in Belarus and neighboring countries.
