= .by =

Top-level Internet domain for Belarus

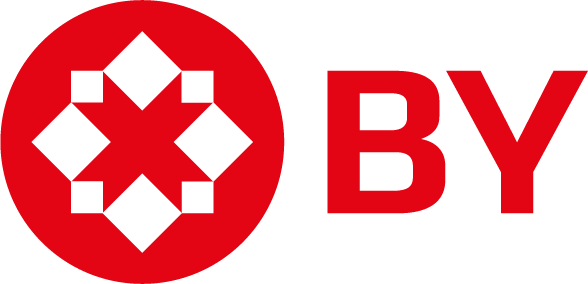
- Introduced: 10 May 1994
- TLD type: Country code top-level domain
- Status: Active
- Registry: Reliable Software Inc.
- Sponsor: Operations and Analysis Centre under the President of the Republic of Belarus
- Intended use: Entities connected with Belarus
- Actual use: Popular in Belarus and the German state of Bavaria
- Registered domains: 143,412 (2022-08-19)
- Registration restrictions: No restrictions; third-level subdomains have specific restrictions
- Structure: Second-level registrations are available, as well as third-level names beneath some second-level labels
- Documents: Registration procedure
- DNSSEC: yes
- Registry website: cctld.by

.by is the Internet country code top-level domain (ccTLD) for Belarus. It is administered by the Operations and Analysis Centre under the President of the Republic of Belarus (Оперативно-аналитический центр при Президенте Республики Беларусь). The BY code originates from the ISO code for Byelorussia, the former name of the country. The ccTLD was created for Belarus on 10 May 1994.

== Eligibility ==
The Operations and Analysis Centre under the President of the Republic of Belarus allows for anyone (not only for those who reside in Belarus) to register a second level domain such as something.by. However, third-level domains .gov.by and .mil.by are reserved for government use only. The names chosen for second-level domains must not conflict with those already registered or with well-known brand names. The names also must have two or more Latin characters and they cannot either start or finish with a hyphen (-). Second-level names that might have words or phrases that are deemed to be vulgar or illegal can also be rejected by the Administrator of ccTLD BY.

== History ==
At the very beginning there was only one company in Belarus which carried out the registration of domains .by – Open Contact Ltd. In October 2006 two other Belarusian companies got the licence to provide technical protection of information, including its execution by cryptographic means, and comprising the usage of a digital signature. Those were Reliable Software Inc. and Business Network JV. The former one has started to receive inquiries and carry out domain registration since 27 March 2007. On 3 September 2007 the licence was granted also to Extmedia and on 29 June to Active Technologies. At present each of the five companies carries out domain registration officially. Since 1994 the only Technical Administrator of the .by domain has been Open Contact Ltd.

According to the results of the competition conducted in September 2010 by the Operations and Analysis Centre (OAC), the authorised government body for the purposes of security of the Internet, the .by domain was redelegated to Reliable Software Inc. (hoster.by). On 7 February 2012 ICANN approved the candidacy of the company unequivocally.

In 2007 while Open Contact Ltd. was the Technical Administrator of the .by domain it announced the reduction of price on national domains from 190,000 Belarusian rubles (US$88) to Br 130,000 ($60). This measure triggered the process of transmission of Belarusian web-sites from generic top-level domains to the national one.

Since 2012, when Reliable Software Inc. (hoster.by) became the Technical Administrator of the .by domain, several changes have been adopted: the assessment of inquiries in the Operations and Analysis Centre (OAC) and a free 30-day reservation of a domain name have been eliminated and WHOIS-service has started to work.

== Fees ==
Since 2011 due to changes in currency exchange rate the price has decreased. The costs to use a .by domain is a US$12 fee for the first year and second payment of $12 to maintain the domain. The renewal of the domain occurs yearly. The maximum upfront payment is 1 years. The payment of the fees occur by bank transfer, WebMoney, credit card or cash depending on the registrar.

== Internationalized country code top-level domain ==
Belarus applied for the Cyrillic top-level domain .бел, intended to be used with subdomains in the same script, which was approved by the ICANN in 2015.
