= Christian cross variants =

Variations on the religious symbol through Christian history

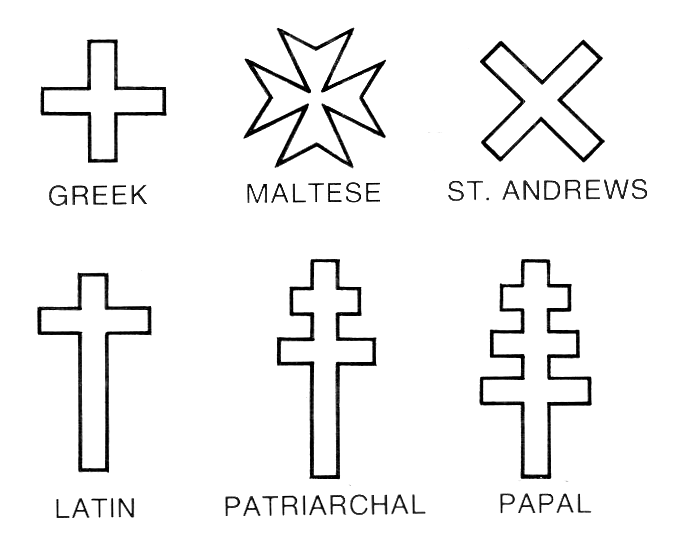
Christian cross variants

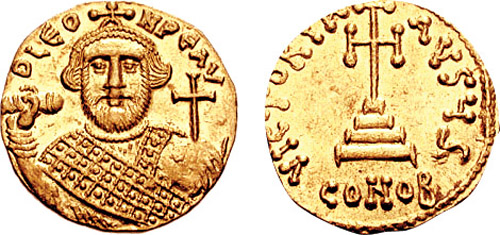
7th-century Byzantine solidus, showing Leontius holding a globus cruciger, with a stepped cross on the reverse side

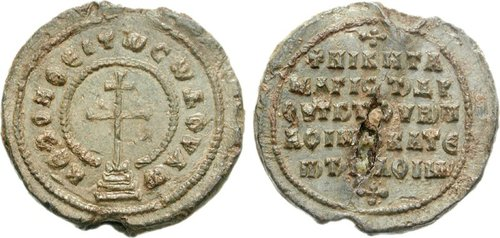
Double-barred cross symbol as used in a 9th-century Byzantine seal

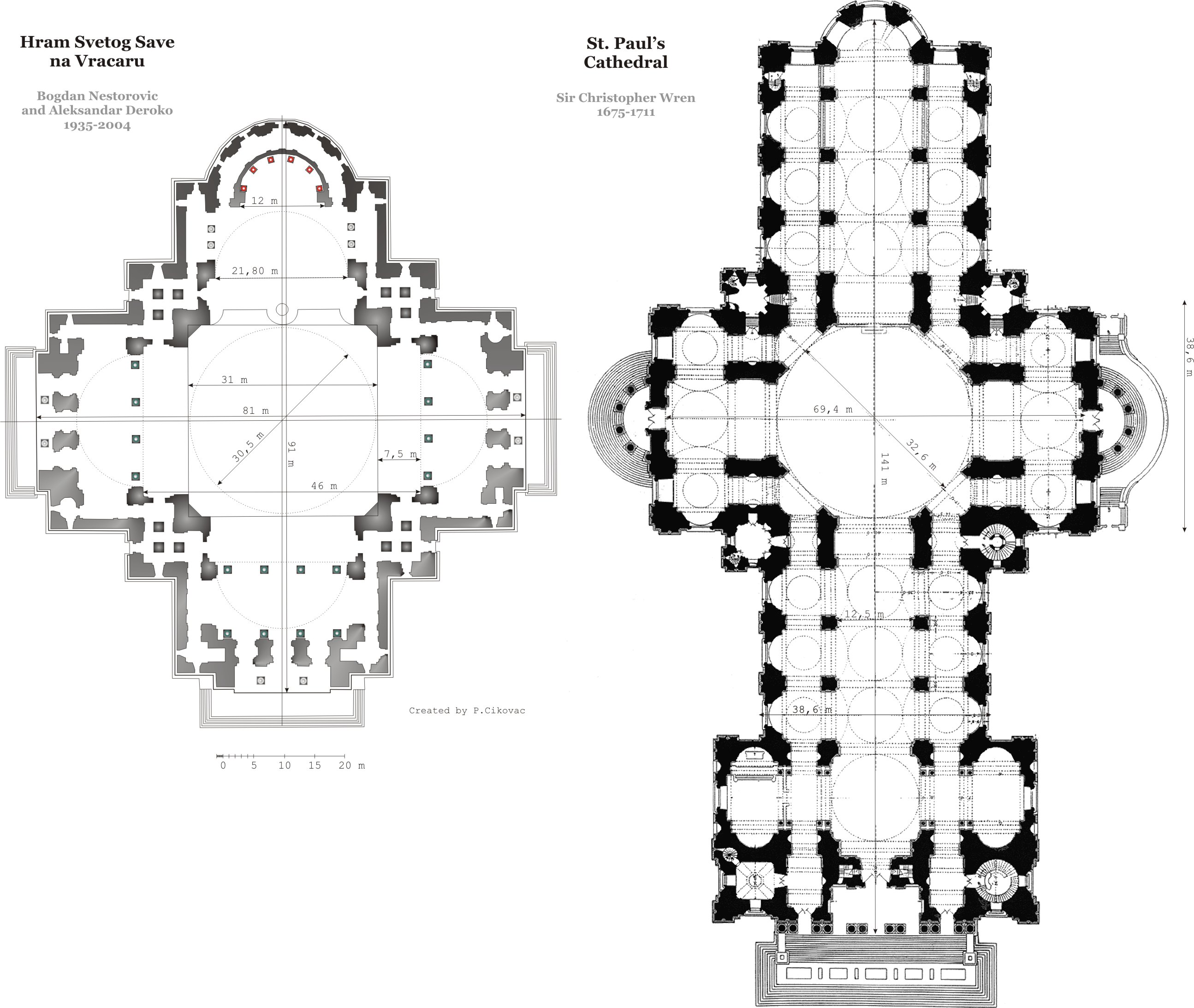
Greek cross (Church of Saint Sava) and extended Greek cross (St Paul's Cathedral) in church floorplans

The Christian cross, with or without a figure of Christ included, is the main religious symbol of Christianity. A cross with a figure of Christ affixed to it is termed a crucifix and the figure is often referred to as the corpus (Latin for "body").

The term Greek cross designates a cross with arms of equal length, as in a plus sign, while the Latin cross designates a cross with an elongated descending arm. Numerous other variants were developed during the medieval period.

Christian crosses are used widely in churches, on top of church buildings, on bibles, in heraldry, in personal jewelry, on hilltops, and elsewhere as an attestation or other symbol of Christianity. Crosses are a prominent feature of Christian cemeteries, either carved on gravestones or as sculpted stelae. Because of this, planting small crosses is sometimes used in countries of Christian culture to mark the site of fatal accidents, or, such as the Zugspitze or Mount Royal, so as to be visible over the entire surrounding area. Catholic, Anglican and Lutheran depictions of the cross are often crucifixes, in order to emphasize that it is Jesus that is important, rather than the cross in isolation. Large crucifixes are a prominent feature of some Lutheran churches, e.g. as a rood. However, some other Protestant traditions depict the cross without the corpus, interpreting this form as an indication of belief in the resurrection rather than as representing the interval between the death and the resurrection of Jesus.

Several Christian cross variants are available in computer-displayed text. A Latin cross ("†") is included in the extended ASCII character set, and several variants have been added to Unicode, starting with the Latin cross in version 1.1. For others, see Religious and political symbols in Unicode.

== Basic forms ==
Basic variants, or early variants widespread since antiquity. A total number of 15 variants.

Image	Name	Description	Refs.
	Latin (or Roman) cross	Cross with a longer descending arm, whereby the top of the upright shaft extends above the transverse beam. It represents the cross of Jesus's crucifixion. In Latin, it was referred to as crux immissa or crux capitata.	
	Greek cross	A type of cross with arms of equal length, used as a national symbol of Greece, Switzerland, and Tonga. Along with the Latin cross, it is one of the most common Christian forms, in common use by the 4th century.	
	Byzantine cross	Upright cross with outwardly widening ends. It is often seen in relics from the late antique and early medieval Byzantine Empire (until c. 800) and was adopted by other Christian cultures of the time, such as the Franks and Goths.	
	Patriarchal cross (two-bar cross)	Also called an archiepiscopal cross or a crux gemina. A double-cross, with the two crossbars near the top. The upper one is shorter, representing the plaque nailed to Jesus's cross. Similar to the Cross of Lorraine, though in the original version of the latter, the bottom arm is lower. The Eastern Orthodox (Slavic) cross adds a slanted bar near the foot.	
	Double cross	The Cross of the eight-point cross-stone ceremony.	
	Cross of Lorraine (two-barred cross)	The Cross of Lorraine consists of one vertical and two horizontal bars. The two-barred cross consists of a vertical line crossed by two shorter horizontal bars. In most renditions, the horizontal bars are "graded" with the upper bar being the shorter, though variations with the bars of equal length are also seen.	
	Papal cross	A cross with three bars near the top. The bars are of unequal length, each one shorter than the one below.	
	Sacred Heart	A depiction of the Sacred Heart of Jesus, featuring flames, a crown of thorns, and a Latin Cross.	
	Cross of Salem	Also known as a pontifical cross, it is similar to a patriarchal cross, but with an additional crossbar below the main crossbar, equal in length to the upper crossbar.	
	Staurogram	The earlier visual image of the cross, already present in New Testament manuscripts as P66, P45 and P75.	
	Chi Rho	The Chi Rho (/ˈkaɪ ˈroʊ/; also known as chrismon) is one of the earliest forms of christogram, formed by superimposing the first two (capital) letters—chi and rho (ΧΡ)—of the Greek word ΧΡΙΣΤΟΣ (Christos) in such a way that the vertical stroke of the rho intersects the center of the chi.	
	Stepped cross	A cross resting on a base with several steps (usually three), also called a graded or a Calvary cross. This symbol first appears on coinage from the time of Byzantine Emperor Heraclius (r. 610–641). The three steps represent Faith, Hope and Charity, and are sometimes marked Fides (top), Spes (middle) and Caritas (bottom), the Latin forms of these words.	
	Jerusalem cross	Also known as the Crusader's Cross. A large cross with a smaller cross in each of its angles. It was used as a symbol of the Kingdom of Jerusalem.	
	Ringed cross	A cross featuring a ring or nimbus. This type has several variants, including the cruciform halo and the Celtic cross. A cruciform halo is used to represent the persons of the Holy Trinity, especially Jesus, and it was used especially in medieval art.	
	Forked cross	A cross in the form of the letter Y that gained popularity in the late 13th or early 14th century in the German Rhineland. Also known as a crucifixus dolorosus, furca, ypsilon cross, Y-cross, thief's cross or robber's cross.	

== Saints' crosses ==
Image	Name	Description	Refs.
	Cross of Saint Peter	A cross with the crossbeam placed near the foot, that is associated with Saint Peter because of the tradition that he was crucified head down. In modern culture, the cross is often also associated with Satanism or anti-Christian sentiment.	
	Tau cross	A T-shaped cross. Also called the Saint Anthony's cross, the Saint Francis' cross and crux commissa.	
	Saltire or crux decussata (Saint Andrew's cross)	An X-shaped cross associated with St. Andrew, patron of Scotland, and so a national symbol of that country. The shape is that of the cross on which Saint Andrew is said to have been martyred. Also known as St. Andrew's Cross or Andrew Cross.	
	Brigid's cross	Bride's cross, also known as Brigid's cross or Brighid's cross, these are usually woven of rushes or wheat stalks. They can be Christian or pagan symbols depending on context. They may have three or four arms.	
Cross of Saint George	Saint George's Cross	Sometimes associated with Saint George, the military saint, often depicted as a crusader from the Late Middle Ages, the cross has appeared on many flags, emblems, standards, and coats of arms. Some notable uses are on the Flag of England and the Georgian flag.	
	Anchored cross	A stylized cross in the shape of an anchor. A varied symbol, the mariner's cross is also referred to as the cross of Saint Clement in reference to the way he was martyred, or the cross of Hope, as a reference to Hebrews 6:19. It traditionally symbolizes security, hope, steadfastness, and composure.	
	Pectoral cross of Cuthbert	A relic associated with Cuthbert.	
Portate cross	Cross of Saint Gilbert (Portate cross)	A cross is usually shown erect, as it would be when used for crucifixion. The Portate Cross differs in that it is borne diagonally, as it would be when the victim bears the cross-bar over his shoulder as he drags it along the ground to the crucifixion site.	
	Cross of Saint James (sword cross)	A red Cross of Saint James with flourished arms, surmounted with an escallop, was the emblem of the twelfth-century Galician and Castilian military Order of Santiago, named after Saint James the Greater.	
	Saint Julian Cross	A Cross Crosslet tilted at 45 degrees. It is sometimes referred to as the Missionary Cross.	
	Grapevine cross (Saint Nino's cross)	Also known as the cross of Saint Nino of Cappadocia, who Christianised Georgia.	
Nasrani cross	Saint Thomas cross	The ancient cross used by Saint Thomas Christians (also known as Syrian Christians or Nasrani) in Kerala, India.	
Phillip cross	Cross of Saint Philip	A sideways cross associated with Philip the Apostle due to a story of him being crucified sideways.	
Cross of Saint Florian	Cross of Saint Florian	A four-petaled flower arranged similar to a Maltese Cross.	
Catherine wheel	Catherine wheel	Seven Catherines have been granted sainthood. This cross is composed of wagon wheels and is attributed to (at least) three saints: Saint Catherine of Alexandria, Saint Jarlath and Saint Quentin.	
Cross of Saint John	Cross of Saint John	A Latin cross with the crossing point, starting initially as wide permanent and widening only at its end to the outside arms. It is not to be confused with the Maltese cross, also known as the St. John's cross. In heraldry, it is a common figure in coat of arms.	
Cross of Saint Chad	Cross of Saint Chad	The cross is a combination of a Potent Cross and Quadrate Cross, which appears in the arms of the episcopal see of Lichfield & Coventry.	
Cross of Saint Jeremiah	Cross of Jeremiah	The cross of the prophet Jeremiah, also known as the "Weeping Prophet".	
Lazarus cross	Cross of Lazarus	A green Maltese cross associated with St. Lazarus.	
Cross of Saint Maurice	Cross of Saint Maurice	A white cross bottony associated with Saint Maurice.	
Cross of Saints Maurice and Lazarus	Cross of Saints Lazarus and Maurice	A combined cross of Saints Lazarus and Maurice	

== Denominational or regional variants ==
Image	Name	Description	Refs.
	Cross of Alcoraz	A red cross surrounded by four moor's heads, used in the coat of arms of Aragon and the flag of Sardinia.	
	Cross of the Angels	Symbol of the city of Oviedo and the Roman Catholic Archdiocese of Oviedo. Donated by king Alfonso II of Asturias in 808.	
	Armenian cross	Symbol of the Armenian Apostolic Church, and a typical feature of khachkars. Also known as the "Blooming Cross" owing to the trefoil emblems at the ends of each branch. A khachkar (cross-stone) is a popular symbol of Armenian Christianity.	
	Bolnisi cross	Ancient Georgian cross and national symbol from the 5th century AD.	
	Caucasian Albanian cross	Ancient Caucasian Albanian cross and national symbol from the 4th century AD.	
	Cross of Burgundy	A saw toothed form of the St. Andrews cross, symbolizing the rough branches he was crucified on. A historic symbol of the Burgundy region, dating back to the 15th century when supporters of the Duke of Burgundy adopted the badge to show allegiance in the Armagnac–Burgundian Civil War.	
	Byzantine cross-crosslet	A Byzantine cross variant seen on several coins and artifacts of the Late Macedonian, Doukas, and Early Komnenos dynasties of the Byzantine Empire (c.950–1092). Combines aspects of the Patriarchal cross, Greek cross, and Calvary cross into a unique variation that may have inspired the later Jerusalem cross.	
	Canterbury cross	A cross with four arms of equal length which widen to a hammer shape at the outside ends. Each arm has a triangular panel inscribed in a triquetra (three-cornered knot) pattern. There is a small square panel in the center of the cross. A symbol of the Anglican and Episcopal Churches.	
	"Carolingian cross"	Cross of triquetras, called "Carolingian" by Rudolf Koch for its appearance in Carolingian-era art.	
	Celtic cross	Essentially a Greek or Latin cross, with a circle enclosing the intersection of the upright and crossbar, as in the standing High crosses.	
	Crux Ansata	Shaped like the letter T usually surmounted by a circle. Not to be confused with an Ankh which is usually surmounted by a drop shape. Adopted from the Egyptian Ankh by the Copts (Egyptian Christians) and Ethiopian Orthodox Christians.	
	Coptic cross	The original Coptic cross has its origin in the Coptic ankh. Many Coptic Christians have the cross tattooed as a sign of faith.	
	New Coptic cross	This new Coptic cross is the cross currently used by the Coptic Catholic Church and the Coptic Orthodox Church of Alexandria.	
	Lalibela cross	This is one of many variations of Ethiopian crosses and generally made up of latticework, used by Ethiopian Christians and associated with the churches of Lalibela.	
	Cossack cross	A type of cross used by Zaporozhian Cossacks and the Armed Forces of Ukraine. Frequently used in Ukraine as a memorial sign to fallen soldiers and in military awards.	
	East Syrian cross	Church of the East cross.	
	Huguenot cross	The cross represents not only the death of Christ but also victory over death and impiety. This is represented also in the Maltese cross. It is boutonné, the eight points symbolising the eight Beatitudes (Matthew 5:3–12) Between the arms of the cross is the stylised fleur-de-lys (on the French Coat of Arms), each has 3 petals; the total of twelve petals of the fleur-de-lys signify the twelve apostles. Between each fleur-de-lys and the arms of the Maltese cross with which it is joined, an open space in the form of a heart, the symbol of loyalty, suggests the seal of the French Reformer, John Calvin. The pendant dove symbolises the Holy Spirit (Romans 8:16). In times of persecution a pearl, symbolizing a teardrop, replaced the dove.	
	Maltese cross	An eight-pointed cross having the form of four V-shaped elements, each joining the others at its vertex, leaving the other two tips spread outward symmetrically. It is the cross symbol associated with the Order of St. John since the Middle Ages, shared with the traditional Knights Hospitaller and the Sovereign Military Order of Malta, and by extension with the island of Malta.	
	Maronite cross	Cross of the Syriac Maronite Church. Reminiscent of the Papal cross and cross of Lazarus.	
	Nestorian cross	In Eastern Christian art found on tombs in China, these crosses are sometimes simplified and depicted as resting on a lotus flower or on a stylized cloud.	
	Occitan cross	Based on the counts of Toulouse's traditional coat of arms, it soon became the symbol of Occitania as a whole.	
	Cross of Peñalba	Symbol of the region of El Bierzo. Donated by king Ramiro II of Leon in 10th century.	
	Rose Cross	A cross with a rose blooming at the center. The central symbol to all groups embracing the philosophy of the Rosicrucians.	
	Serbian cross	A Greek cross with a C (Cyrillic S) in each of its angles, inspired by the imperial motto of the Palaiologos dynasty, but with the meaning of "Only unity saves the Serbs" (Само Слога Србина Спасава), generally attributed to Serbian patron saint, St. Sava. A national symbol of Serbia and symbol of the Serbian Orthodox Church. The cross is used on the coat of arms of Serbia and the flag of Serbia.	
	Orthodox cross	Also known as the Russian cross, Slavic, Slavonic cross, or Eastern Orthodox, Russian Orthodox cross. A three-barred cross in which the short top bar represents the inscription over Jesus' head, and the lowest (usually slanting) short bar, placed near the foot, represents his footrest (in Latin, suppedaneum). This cross existed in a slightly different form (with the bottom crossbeam pointing upwards) in Byzantium, and it was changed and adopted by the Russian Orthodox Church and especially popularized in the East Slavic countries.	
	Russian cross	Six-pointed variant of Russian Orthodox cross. Also called the suppedaneum cross, meaning under-foot cross, referring to the bar where Jesus put his feet while crucified.	
	Macedonian Cross, also known as Veljusa Cross.	Macedonian Christian symbol.	
	Anuradhapura cross	A symbol of Christianity in Sri Lanka.	
	Nordic cross/Scandinavian cross	A sideways cross typically used on flags of Scandinavian countries, originally derived from the flag of Denmark.	
	West Syrian cross	Syriac Orthodox cross.	
	Gion-mamori mon	The mon of the Gion Shrine, depicting two crossed amulets and a horn, adopted by Kakure Kirishitans persecuted under the Tokugawa Shogunate.	
	Troll cross	A Christian cross engraved on objects in Scandinavia to ward off evil spirits such as trolls.	
	Victory Cross	Symbol of the Principality of Asturias. Donated by king Alfonso III of Asturias in early 10th-century.	

== Non-denominational symbols ==
Image	Name	Description	Refs.
	Cross and Crown	A Christian symbol used by various Christian denominations, particularly the Bible Student movement and the Church of Christ, Scientist. It has also been used in heraldry. The emblem is often interpreted as symbolizing the reward in heaven (the crown) coming after the trials in this life (the cross) (James 1:12).	
	Gamma cross	A Greek cross. Each gamma represents one of the four Evangelists, radiating from the central Greek Cross, which represents Christ. The term "Gamma cross" can refer to either a voided cross or a swastika.	
	Cross of passion	The Passion Cross has sharpened points at the end of one or more of the cross members. It is also referred to as the Cross of Suffering representing the nails that Christ suffered at his Crucifixion. In heraldry, it is known as the Cross aiguisée.	

== Modern innovations ==
Image	Name	Description	Refs.
	Marian Cross	A term invented to refer to Pope John Paul II's combination of a Latin cross and the letter M, representing Mary being present on Calvary.	
	Off Center Cross of Christian Universalism.	The off-center cross was invented in late April 1946, in a hotel room in Akron, Ohio, during the Universalist General Assembly, where a number of Universalist ministers pooled their ideas.	
	Ordnance Survey cross symbols	Used on Ordnance Survey maps to represent churches and chapels. A cross on a filled square represents a church with a tower; and a cross on a filled circle represents a church with a spire. Churches without towers or spires are represented by plain Greek crosses. These symbols also now refer to non-Christian places of worship, and the cross on a filled circle also represents a place of worship with a minaret or dome.	
	Cross of Camargue	Symbol for the French region of Camargue, created in 1926 by the painter Hermann-Paul at the request of Folco de Baroncelli-Javon to represent the "Camargue nation" of herdsmen and fishermen. It embodies the three theological virtues of Christianity: faith (represented by tridents of gardians on a Christian cross), hope (represented by the anchor of sinners), and charity (represented by the heart of The Three Marys).	
	Ecumenical cross	Symbol of ecumenism, the concept that all church denominations should work together to promote Christian unity. Adopted in 1948, symbolizing the message of the ecumenical movement and tracing its origins to the gospel story of the calling of the disciples by Jesus and the stilling of the storm on Lake Galilee.	

== Crosses of orders ==
Image	Name	Description	Refs.
	Iron Cross	A German military cross originating as a military decoration in Prussia. Later used in various military and security force decorations in the unified German Empire, Weimar Republic, Nazi Germany and the modern Federal Republic, particularly as a symbol of the German Air Force (Luftwaffe).	
	Order of Christ Cross	A red Greek cross starting initially as wide permanent and widening only at its end to the outside arms, with a white inner simple Greek cross. Not to be confused with the Cross of Saint John nor the Maltese cross. It's the insignia of the Military Order of Christ (Portuguese: Ordem Militar de Cristo), former Knights Templar order as it was reconstituted in Portugal after the Templars were abolished on 22 March 1312, being the Grand Master the current President of Portugal. It's an honorific symbol of the Portuguese Navy, and current symbol of the Portuguese Air Force.	
	Supreme Order of Christ Cross	A red Latin cross starting initially as wide permanent and widening only at its end to the outside arms, with a white inner simple Latin cross. Not to be confused with the Cross of Saint John nor the Maltese cross. It's the symbol of the Papal Supreme Order of Christ (Italian: Ordine Supremo del Cristo), the highest order of chivalry awarded by the Pope, and it's the Papal parallel to the Order of Christ in both Portugal and Brazil.	

== Types of artifacts ==
Image	Name	Description	Refs.
	Crucifix	A cross with a representation of Jesus' body hanging from it. It is primarily used in Catholic, Anglican, Lutheran, and Eastern Orthodox churches (where the figure is painted), and it emphasizes Christ's sacrifice—his death by crucifixion. It is also used on most rosaries, a Catholic tool for prayer.	
	Altar cross	A cross on a flat base to rest upon the altar of a church. The earliest known representation of an altar cross appears in a miniature in a 9th-century manuscript. By the 10th century such crosses were in common use, but the earliest extant altar cross is a 12th-century one in the Great Lavra on Mount Athos. Mass in the Roman Rite requires the presence of a cross (more exactly, a crucifix) "on or close to" the altar. Accordingly, the required cross may rest on the reredos rather than on the altar, or it may be on the wall behind the altar or be suspended above the altar.	
	Blessing cross	Used by priests of the Eastern Catholic, Eastern Orthodox and Oriental Orthodox Churches to bestow blessings upon the faithful.	
	Cross necklace	A small cross or crucifix worn as a pendant on a necklace.	
	High cross	A large stone cross that is richly decorated. From the 19th century, many large modern versions have been erected for various functions, and smaller Celtic crosses have become popular for individual grave monuments, usually featuring only abstract ornament, usually interlace.	
	Processional cross	Used to lead religious processions; sometimes, after the procession it is placed behind the altar to serve as an altar cross.	
	Crux gemmata	A cross inlaid with gems with the Greek letters Alpha and Omega suspended from the arms.	
	Pectoral cross	A large cross worn in front of the chest (in Latin, pectus) by some clergy.	
	Rood	Large crucifix high in a church; most medieval Western churches had one, often with figures of the Virgin Mary and John the Evangelist alongside, and often mounted on a rood screen	
	Globus cruciger	An artifact consisting of a golden orb (representing the world) surmounted by a cross, used in Imperial imagery since the Late Roman Empire. The globus cruciger made its way into the Imperial regalia of the Byzantine Empire, and was later adopted by the Papacy, Holy Roman Empire, and many other countries of the Late Medieval and Early Modern era to signify Imperial authority over Christendom.	
	Conciliation cross	A type of cross erected where murders or accidents have occurred, typically in Central Europe.	
	Wayside cross	A cross erected near a path near the edge of a field or forest serve as waymarks for walkers or pilgrims.	
	Battlefield cross	A cross made to commemorate a military serviceperson killed in action, made from their rifle, boots, and helmet. It is a military tradition in the United States.	
	Wolf cross	A silver pendant from the Viking period (c. 11th century) found in Foss, Iceland, sometimes described as "wolf cross" (vargkors). It could be interpreted both as a Christian cross and as a Heathen Thor's hammer (Mjolnir or Mjöllnir).	

== Unicode ==
For use in documents made using a computer, there are Unicode code-points for multiple types of Christian crosses.

- U+16ED ᛭ RUNIC CROSS PUNCTUATION
- U+205C ⁜ DOTTED CROSS
- U+2626 ☦ ORTHODOX CROSS
- U+2627 ☧ CHI RHO
- U+2628 ☨ CROSS OF LORRAINE
- U+2629 ☩ CROSS OF JERUSALEM
- U+2670 ♰ WEST SYRIAC CROSS
- U+2671 ♱ EAST SYRIAC CROSS
- U+2719 ✙ OUTLINED GREEK CROSS
- U+271A ✚ HEAVY GREEK CROSS
- U+271B ✛ OPEN CENTRE CROSS
- U+271C ✜ HEAVY OPEN CENTRE CROSS
- U+271D ✝ LATIN CROSS
- U+271E ✞ SHADOWED WHITE LATIN CROSS
- U+271F ✟ OUTLINED LATIN CROSS
- U+2720 ✠ MALTESE CROSS
- U+1F548 🕈 CELTIC CROSS

There are code points for other crosses in the block Miscellaneous Symbols and Pictographs, mainly variants of the Greek cross, but their usage may be limited by availability of a computer font that can display them.

== See also ==
- Christian Cross
- Crosses in heraldry
- Christian symbolism
- Saint symbolism
- Nordic cross flag
- Crucifixion in the arts
- Cultural, political, and religious symbols in Unicode
- Cross
