= Russian Orthodox cross =

Variation of the Christian cross

Orthodox cross

Russian cross

Greek cross

Serbian cross

The Russian Orthodox Cross (or just the Orthodox Cross by some Russian Orthodox traditions) is a variation of the Christian cross used since the 16th century in Russia, although it bears some similarity to a cross with a bottom crossbeam slanted the other way (upwards) found since the 6th century in the Byzantine Empire. The Russian Orthodox cross has three horizontal crossbeams, with the lowest one slanted downwards. Today it is a symbol of the Russian Orthodox Church and a distinctive feature of the cultural landscape of Russia. Other names for the symbol include the Russian cross, and Slavonic or Suppedaneum cross.

The earliest cross with a slanted footstool (pointing upwards, unlike the Russian cross) was introduced in the 6th century before the break between Catholic and Orthodox churches, and was used in Byzantine frescoes, arts, and crafts. In 1551 during the canonical isolation of the Russian Orthodox Church, Ivan the Terrible, Grand Prince of Moscow, first used this cross, with the footstool tilted the other way, on the domes of churches. From this time, it started to be depicted on the Russian state coat of arms and military banners. In the second half of the 19th century, this cross was promoted by the Russian Empire in the former Grand Duchy of Lithuania as a symbol of its Russification policy.

One variant known as the Russian cross has only two horizontal crossbeams with the lower one slanted; another is the cross over crescent variant. Some Russian sources distinguish the Russian Orthodox cross from the Orthodox cross. In Unicode the symbol (☦) is denoted as Orthodox cross. The same USVA headstone emblem is called Russian Orthodox cross.

== Name ==
According to many sources the name of the three beam slanted cross is the Russian (Orthodox) cross (Russian: русский православный крест).

Sometimes it is also called the Byzantine cross. Alternatively, "Byzantine cross" is also the name for a Latin cross with outwardly spreading ends, as it was the most common cruciform in the Byzantine Empire. Other crosses (patriarchal cross, Russian Orthodox cross, etc.) are sometimes denominated as Byzantine crosses, as they also were used in Byzantine culture.

Sometimes it is also called just the Orthodox cross. At the same time the various Orthodox churches use different crosses, and any of them may be called an "Orthodox cross". Moreover, there are no crosses universally acknowledged as "Orthodox" or "Catholic": each type is a product of tradition and varied motivations in the history of a particular church or regions.

The cross has also been referred to as the Eastern cross, which "has a special place in Ukrainian religious life" and has been used by the Ukrainian Orthodox and Byzantine Catholic churches. Variants of the three-bar cross have been used as far back as the time of the Kievan Rus' (from 988 AD), and is still used by Ukrainian Catholics and Ukrainian Orthodox Christians.

== Meaning ==
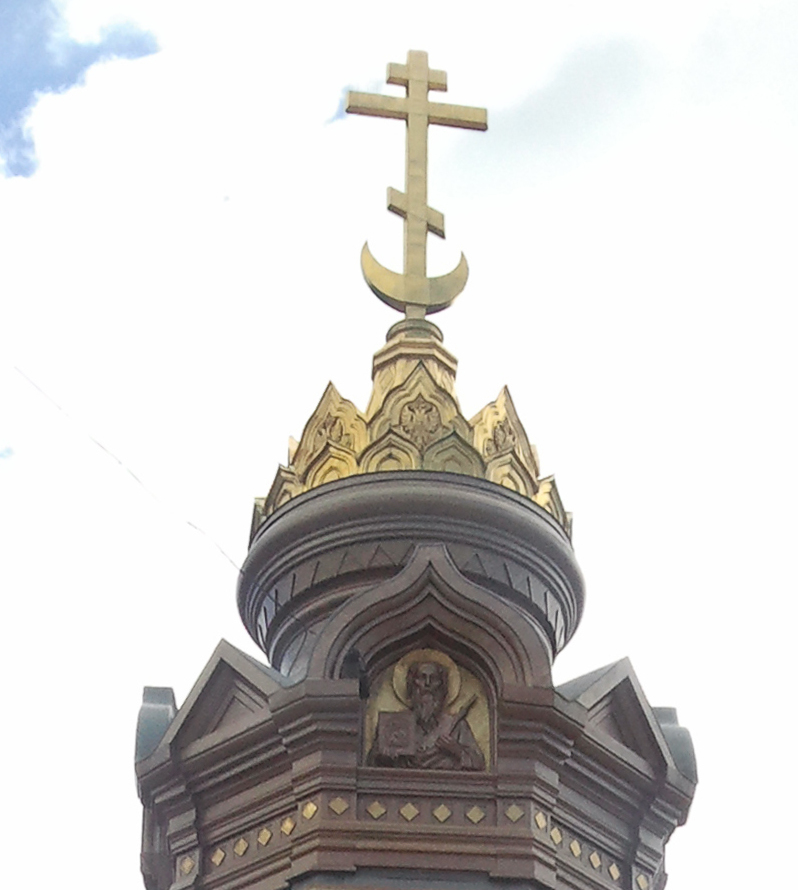
Cross-over-Crescent variation of the Orthodox Cross at the Plevna Chapel in Moscow

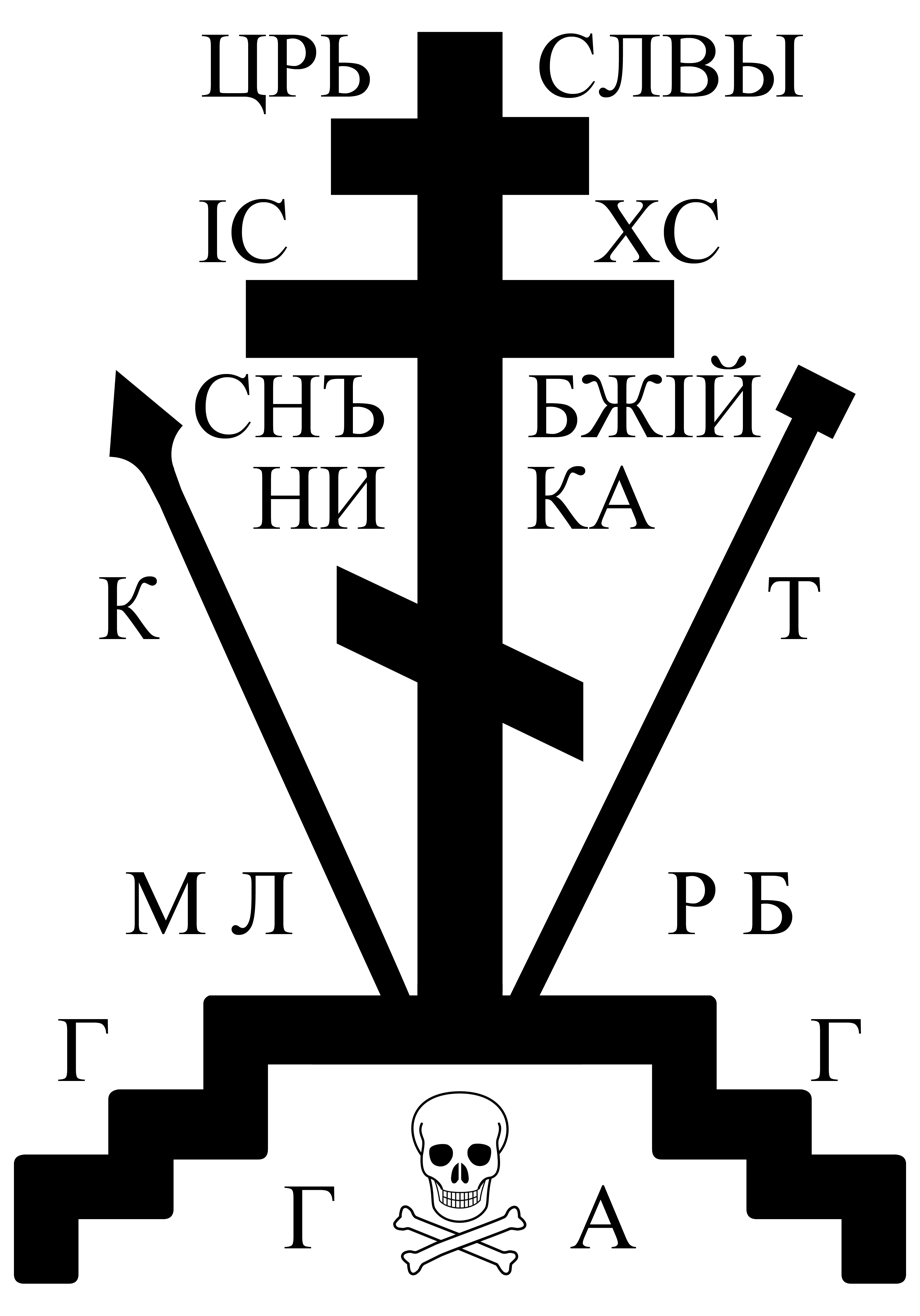
Calvary variant of Russian Orthodox Cross

The topmost of the three crossbeams represents Pilate's inscription (titulus), which in the older Greek tradition read "The King of Glory"; but in later images, based on John's Gospel, it reads INRI. The middle crossbeam is the main bar to which the victim's hands are fixed in crucifixion, while the bottom (sloping) crossbeam represents the footrest which prolongs the torture. In many depictions, the side of the footrest to Christ's right is higher, slanting upward toward the penitent thief St. Dismas, who was crucified on Jesus' right, but downward toward impenitent thief Gestas, who mocked Christ on the cross. (Their names are preserved not in the Gospels, but in the apocryphal tradition.) Popular lore explains that the footrest points up, toward Heaven, on Christ's right hand-side, and downward, to Hell, on Christ's left. The cross is often depicted in icons "of the crucifixion in historic Byzantine style".

One variation of the Russian Cross is the 'Cross over Crescent', which is sometimes accompanied by "Gabriel perched on the top of the Cross blowing his trumpet". Didier Chaudet, in the academic journal China and Eurasia Forum Quarterly, writes that an "emblem of the Orthodox Church is a cross on top on a crescent. It is said that this symbol was devised by Ivan the Terrible, after the conquest of the city of Kazan, as a symbol of the victory of Christianity over Islam through his soldiers".

Another variation is the monastic Calvary Cross, in which the cross stands atop the hill of Calvary, its slopes symbolized by steps. To the viewer's left is the Holy Lance, with which a Roman soldier pierced Jesus in his side, and to the right, the pole topped by a hyssop sponge with which he was given vinegar. Under Calvary are depicted Adam's skull and bones; the right-arm bone is usually above the left one, and believers fold their arms across their chests in this way during Orthodox communion. Around the cross are abbreviations in Church Slavonic: ЦР҃Ь СЛ҃ВЫ — «Царь Славы», Lord of Glory; ІС҃ ХС҃ - Иисус Христос, Jesus Christ; СН҃Ъ БЖ҃ІЙ — «Сын Божий» Son of God; НИКА - Victor; К - копьё, spear; Т - трость, pole (with a sponge); М Л Р Б — «место лобное рай бысть» "place of execution is paradise", Г Г — «гора Голгофа» "Mount Golgotha" (Calvary), Г А — «глава Адамова» "Adam's head". This type of cross is usually embroidered on a schema-monk's robe.

== Current usage ==
The Russian (Orthodox) cross is widely used by the Russian Orthodox Church, and has been widely adopted in the Polish Orthodox and the Czech and Slovak Orthodox Churches, which received their autonomous status from the Patriarch of Moscow in 1948 and 1951 respectively. It is also sometimes used by the Ecumenical Patriarchate of Constantinople (e.g. in the American Carpatho-Russian Orthodox Diocese). "Though commonly associated with the Russian Orthodox Church, this [cross] is found also in the Greek and Serbian Orthodox churches" and is also used by Eastern Rite Catholic Churches.

This cross is also found in Byzantine frescoes in churches now belonging to the Greek and Serbian Orthodox churches.

== History ==
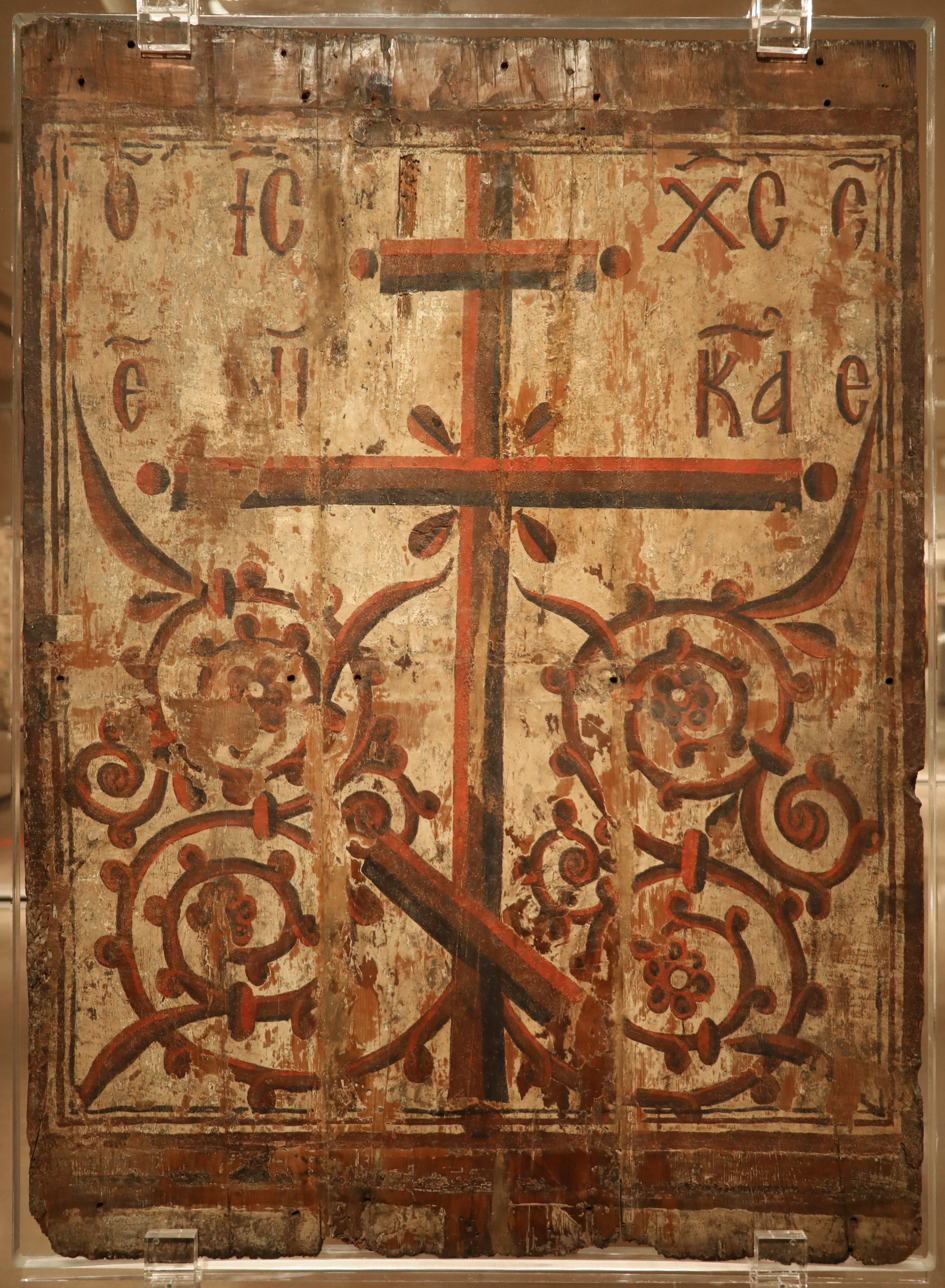
Double-sided icon with Christ Pantocrator and an Orthodox cross, Constantinople, 15th century

The slanted cross with three horizontal crossbeams existed already in the 6th century, long before the Great Schism. However, it was used only in church paintings, arts and crafts, and never on church domes. There are old frescoes depicting this type of cross in the regions of modern Greece and Serbia. One Byzantine icon featuring the three-bar cross, with the slanted crossbeam for the feet of Christ, is an 11th century mosaic of the resurrection. The three-bar cross "existed very early in Byzantium, but was adopted by the Russian Orthodox Church and especially popularized in Slavic countries."

At the end of the 15th century this cross started to be widely used in Russian Tsardom when its rulers declared themselves the "Third Rome", successors of Byzantium and defenders of Orthodoxy. In 1551 at the council of the canonically isolated Russian Orthodox Church, the Grand Prince of Moscow Ivan the Terrible decided to standardize the cross on Russian church domes to distinguish Russian Tsardom from the "Lithuanian, Polack cross". This was the first time the Russian Orthodox Cross was used on church domes. During 1577–1625, the Russian Orthodox cross was depicted between the heads of a double-headed eagle in the coat of arms of Russia. It was drawn on military banners until the end of the 17th century.

In 1654, the Moscow council, erasing the vestiges of the canonical isolation of 1448–1589, coordinated Russian Orthodox liturgy with that of other Orthodox churches. At this council, Patriarch Nikon ordered the use of the Greek cross instead of Russian Orthodox cross. These reforms provoked the Raskol schism. Replacement of the Russian Orthodox cross by Greek cross was caused by Russian disrespect for the second one. Soon, however, the Russian Orthodox Church began to use the Russian Orthodox cross again. According to the Metropolitan of Ryazan and Murom Stefan, the Russian Orthodox cross was worn by Czar Peter I (1672–1725), who transformed the Moscow Patriarchate into the Most Holy Synod.

In the 19th and 20th centuries, the Russian Orthodox cross was promoted by the Russian Empire and USSR in Belarus, Poland and Ukraine as a part of Russification policies. At the end of the 20th century and the beginning of the 21st century, the Russian Orthodox Church replaced many traditional Greek Orthodox crosses in Belarus with Russian Orthodox crosses. This suggests that it was understood as a nationalist Russian symbol rather than a religious Orthodox one.

The Russian Orthodox cross is depicted on emblems of several Russian ultra-nationalist organizations such as Brotherhood of Russian Truth and Russian National Unity.

== Gallery ==
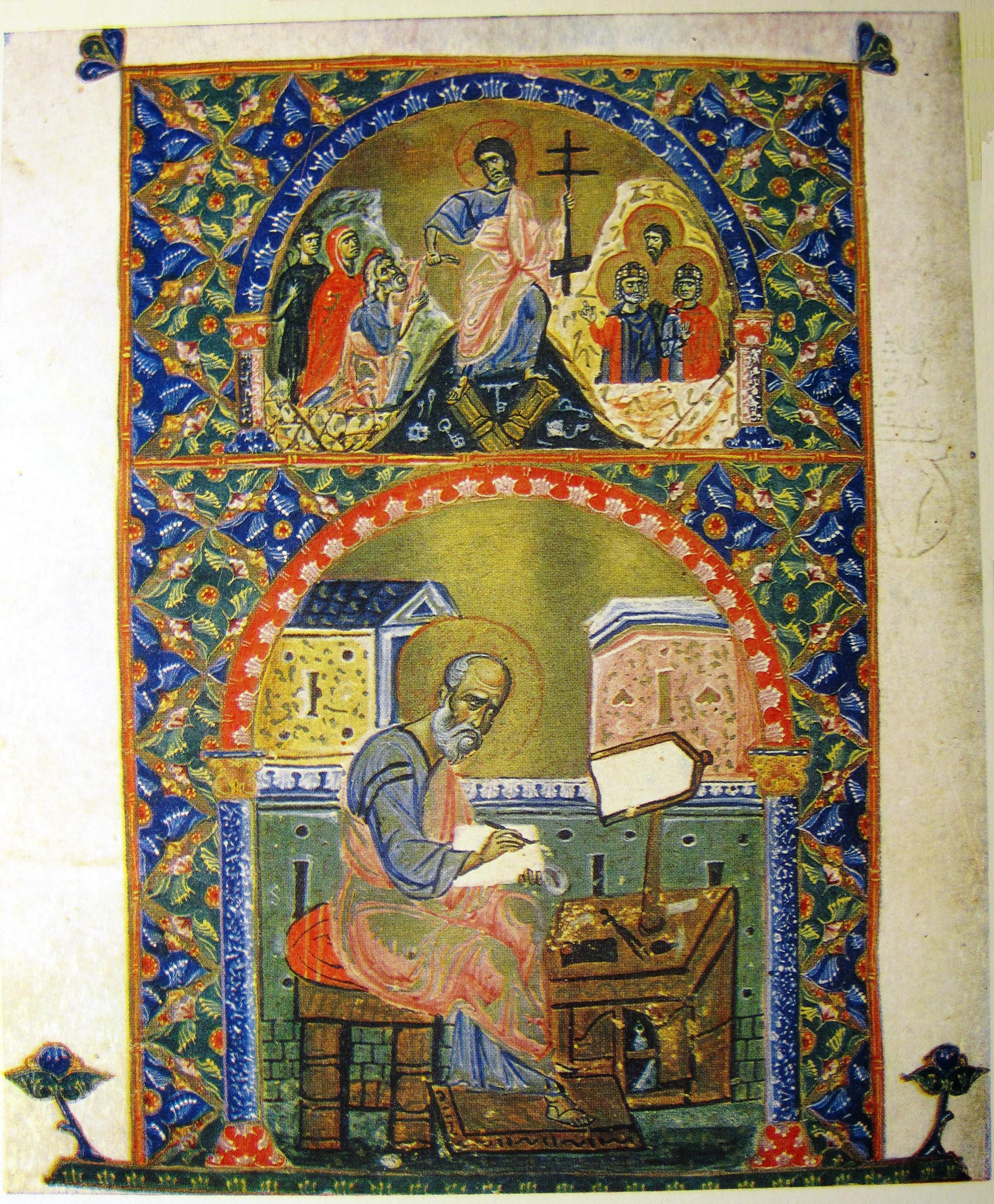
A folio from the Vani Gospels manuscript, copied at the behest of Queen Tamar.

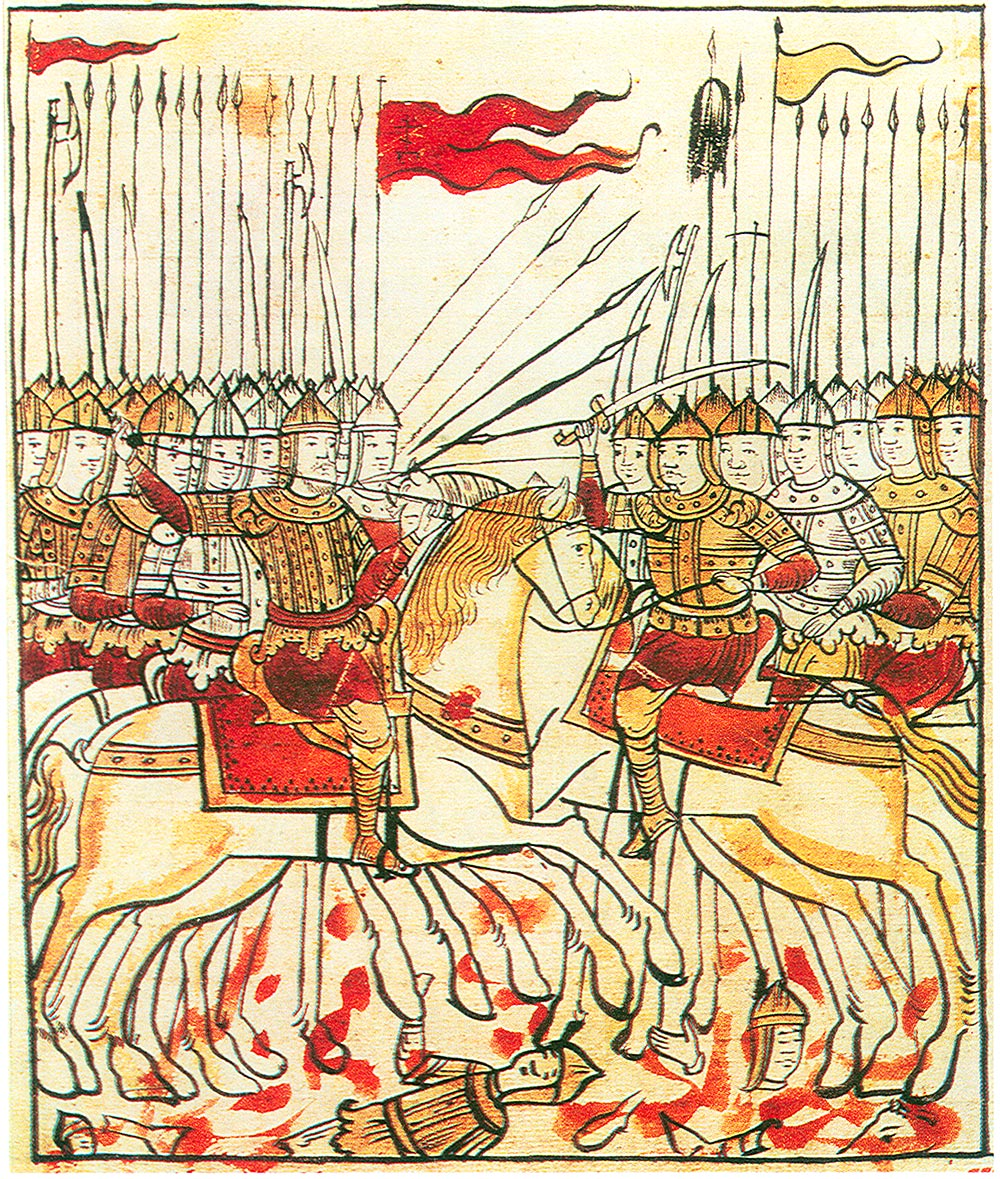
A 17th-century miniature of the Battle of Kulikovo (1380). A warrior bears a red banner with a cross.

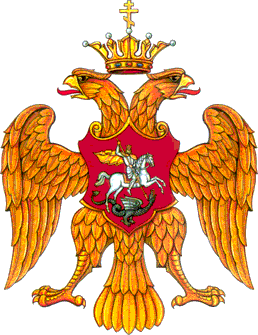
Coat of arms of Russia from the seal of Ivan IV (the Terrible), 1577

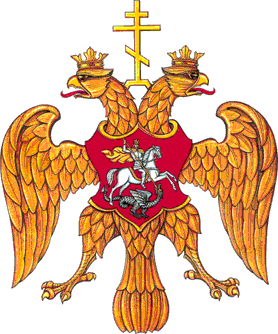
Coat of arms of Russia from the seal of Fyodor I, 1589

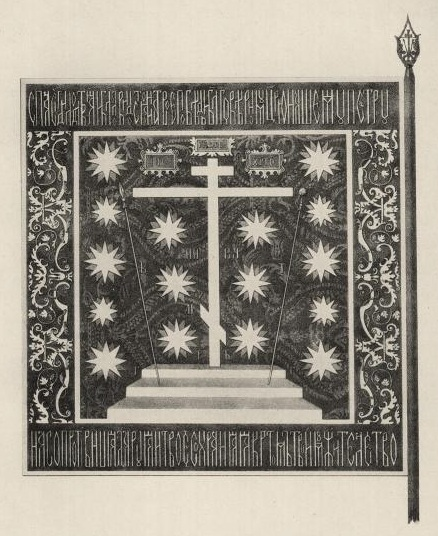
Russian military flag, 1696–1699

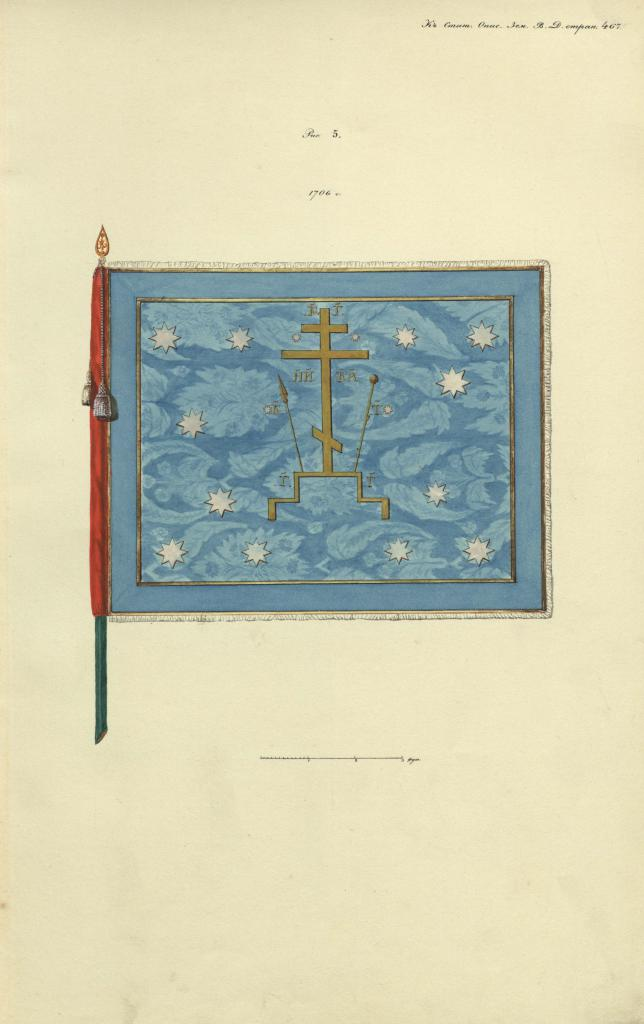
Russian military flag, 1706

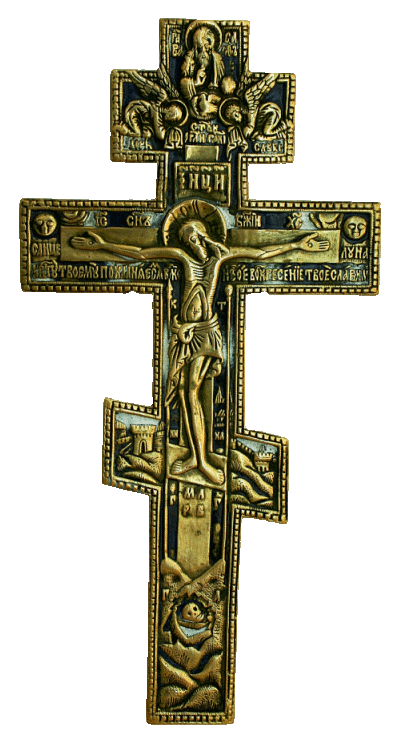
A copper cross typical for Old believers

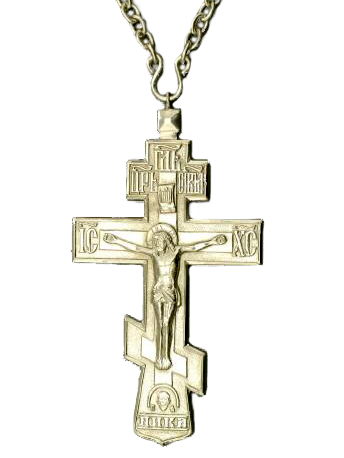
A cross of a Russian Orthodox priest

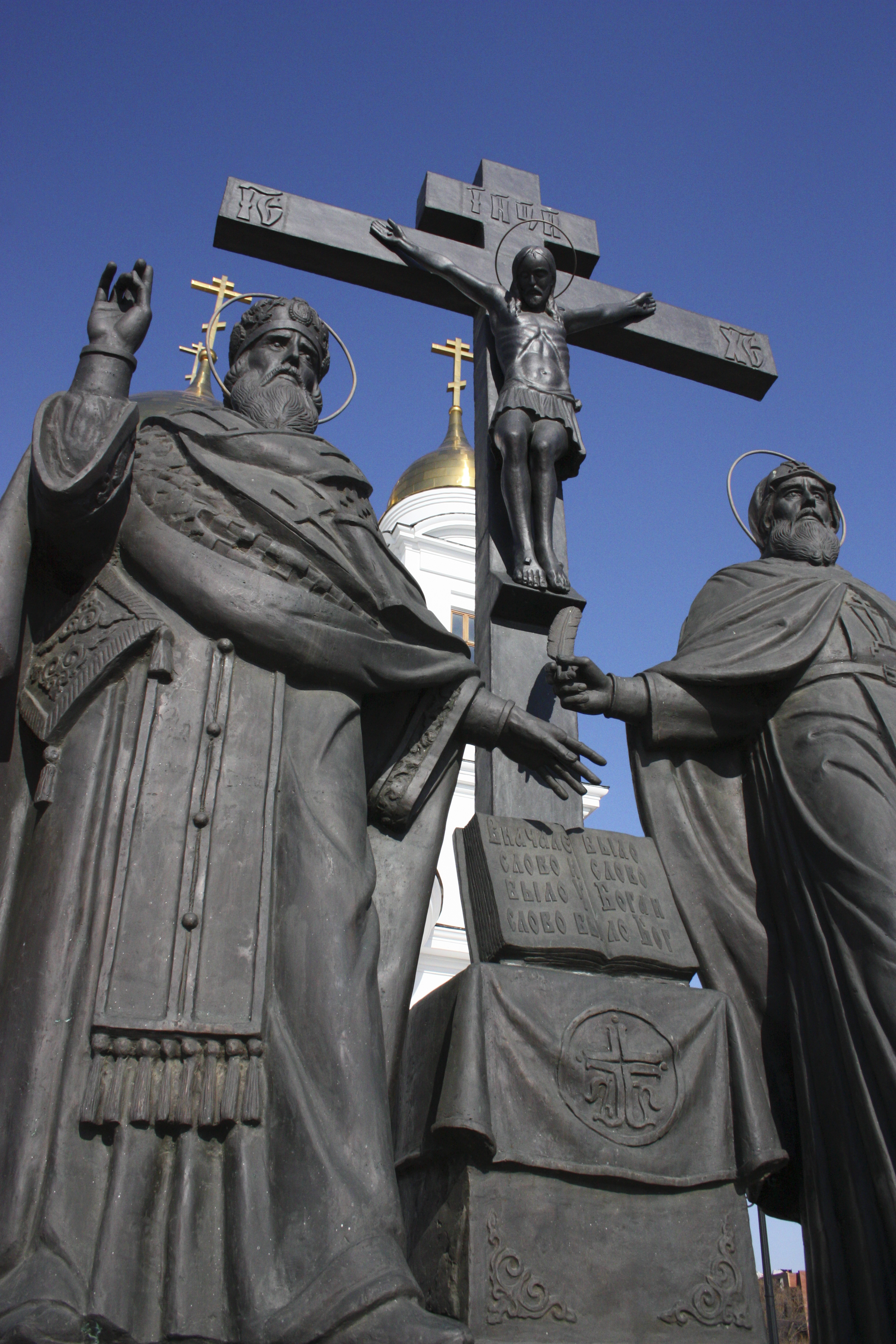
A modern memorial to Ss. Cyril and Methodius in Khanty-Mansiysk, Russia

Coat of arms of Moscow Oblast, 2005

Coat of arms of Perm Krai, 2007

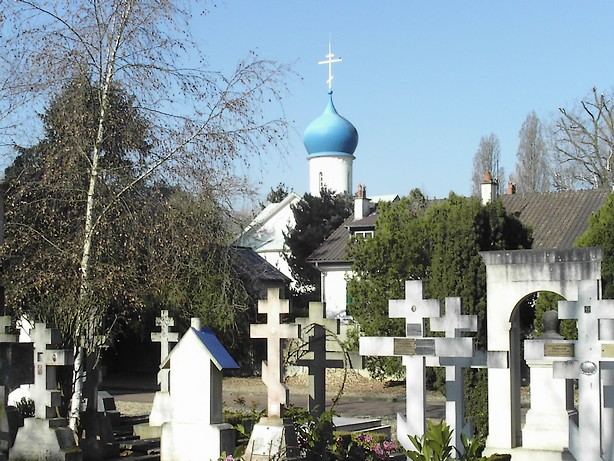
Sainte-Geneviève-des-Bois Russian Cemetery, the resting place of many eminent Russian émigrés

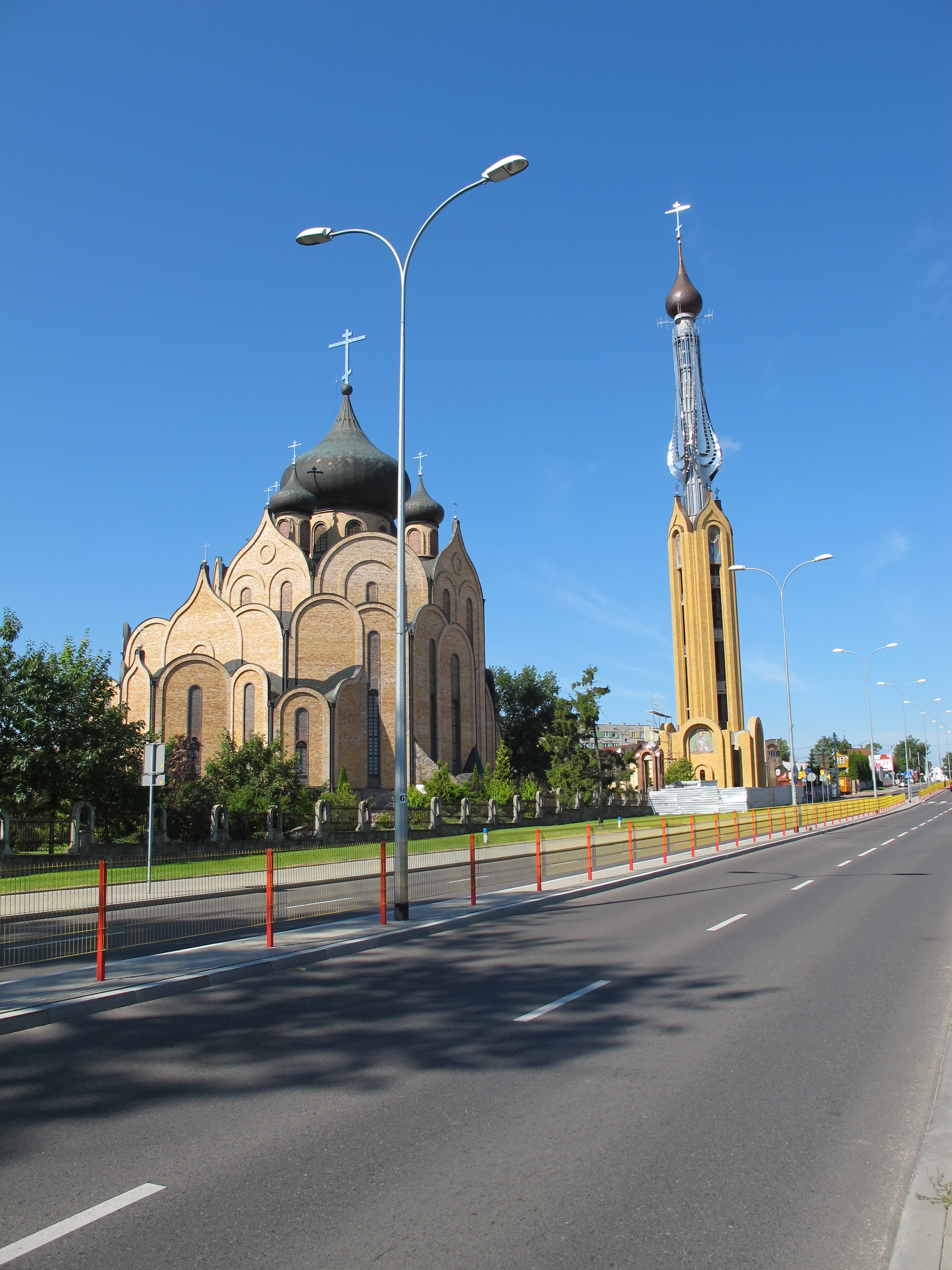
Białystok (Poland): Crosses on the domes of the Church of the Holy Spirit

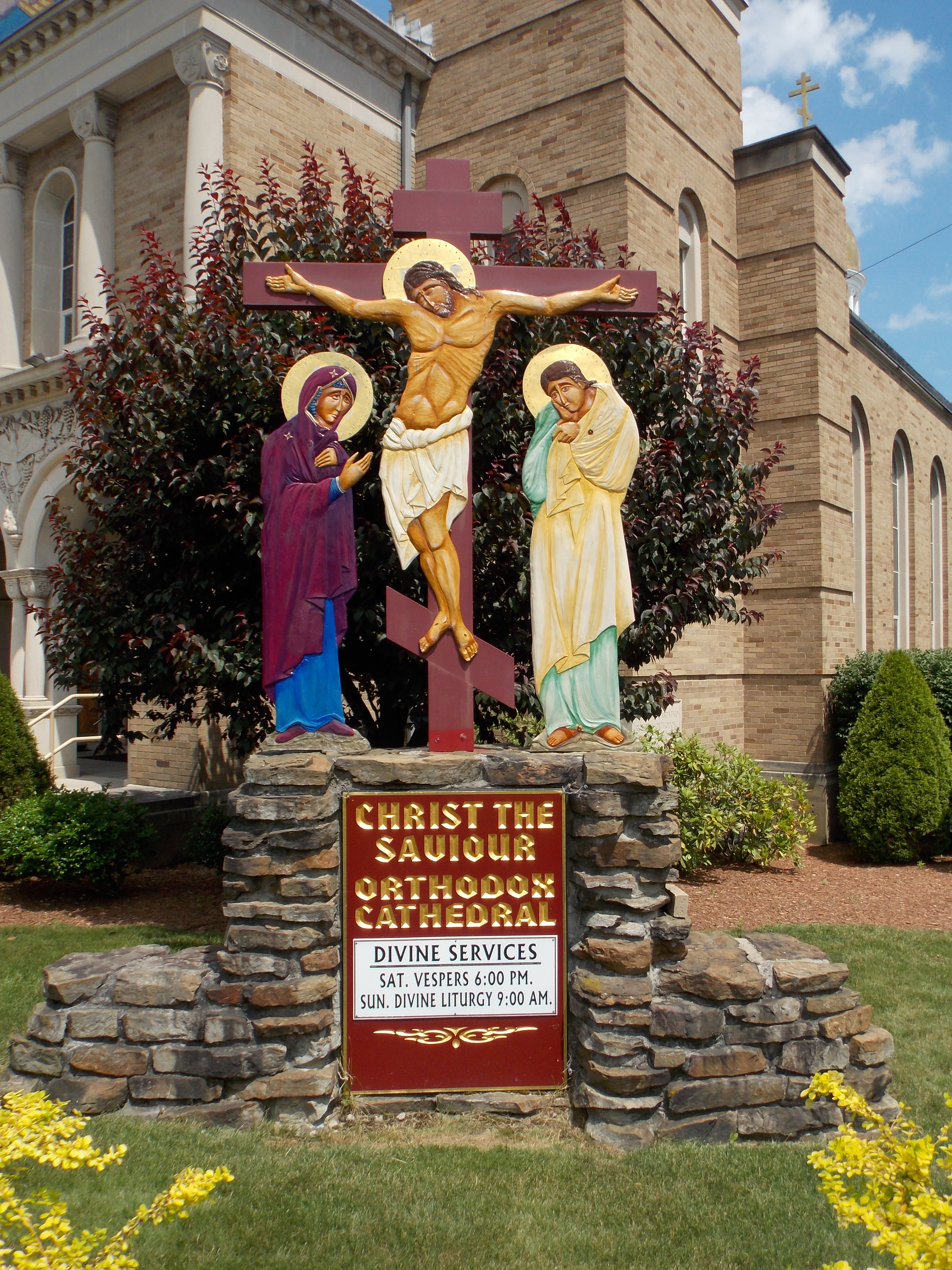
Johnstown, Pennsylvania: Christ the Saviour Cathedral of the American Carpatho-Russian Orthodox Diocese (under the Ecumenical Patriarchate of Constantinople)

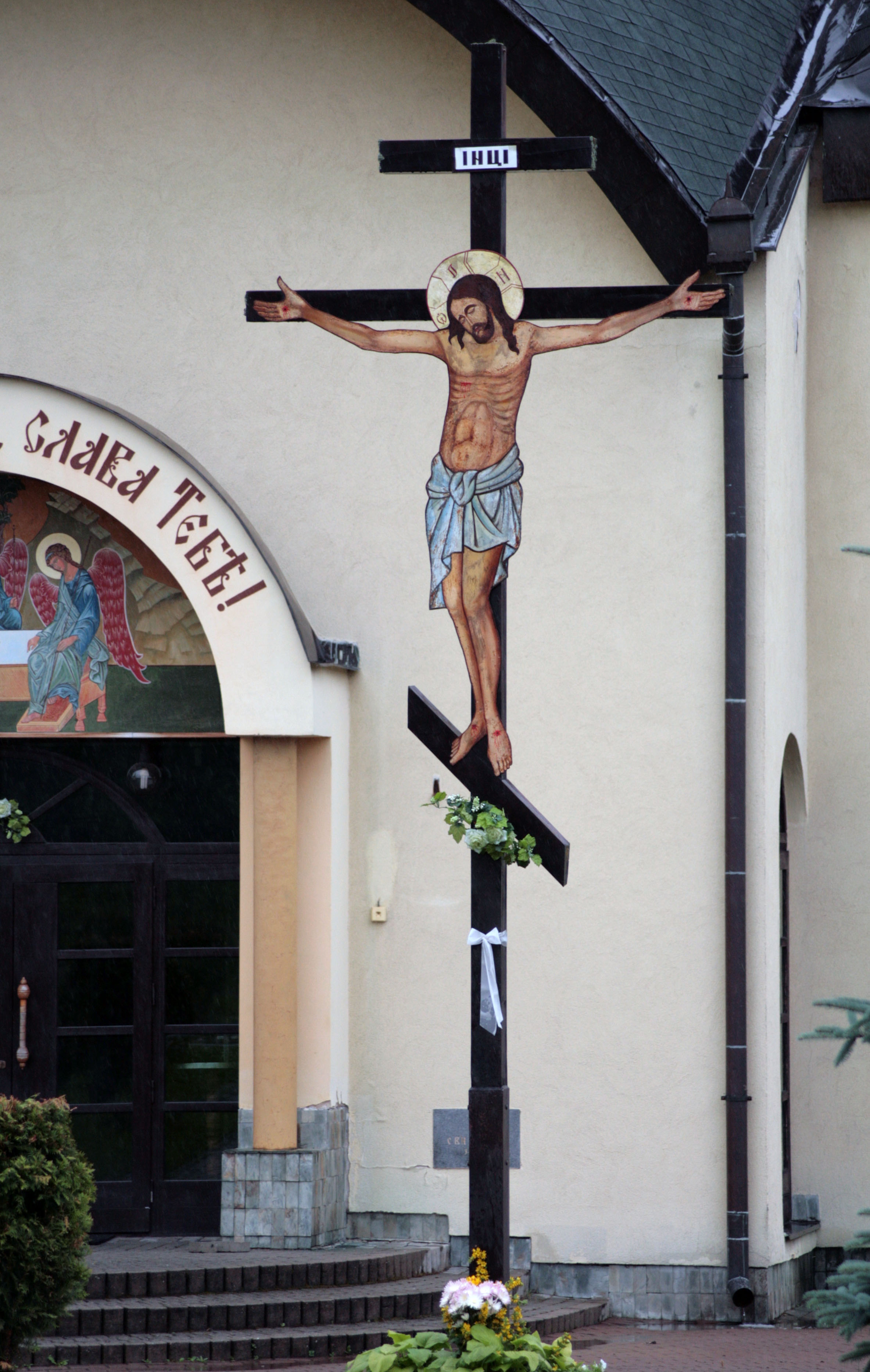
Svidník (Slovakia): Cross in front of a church

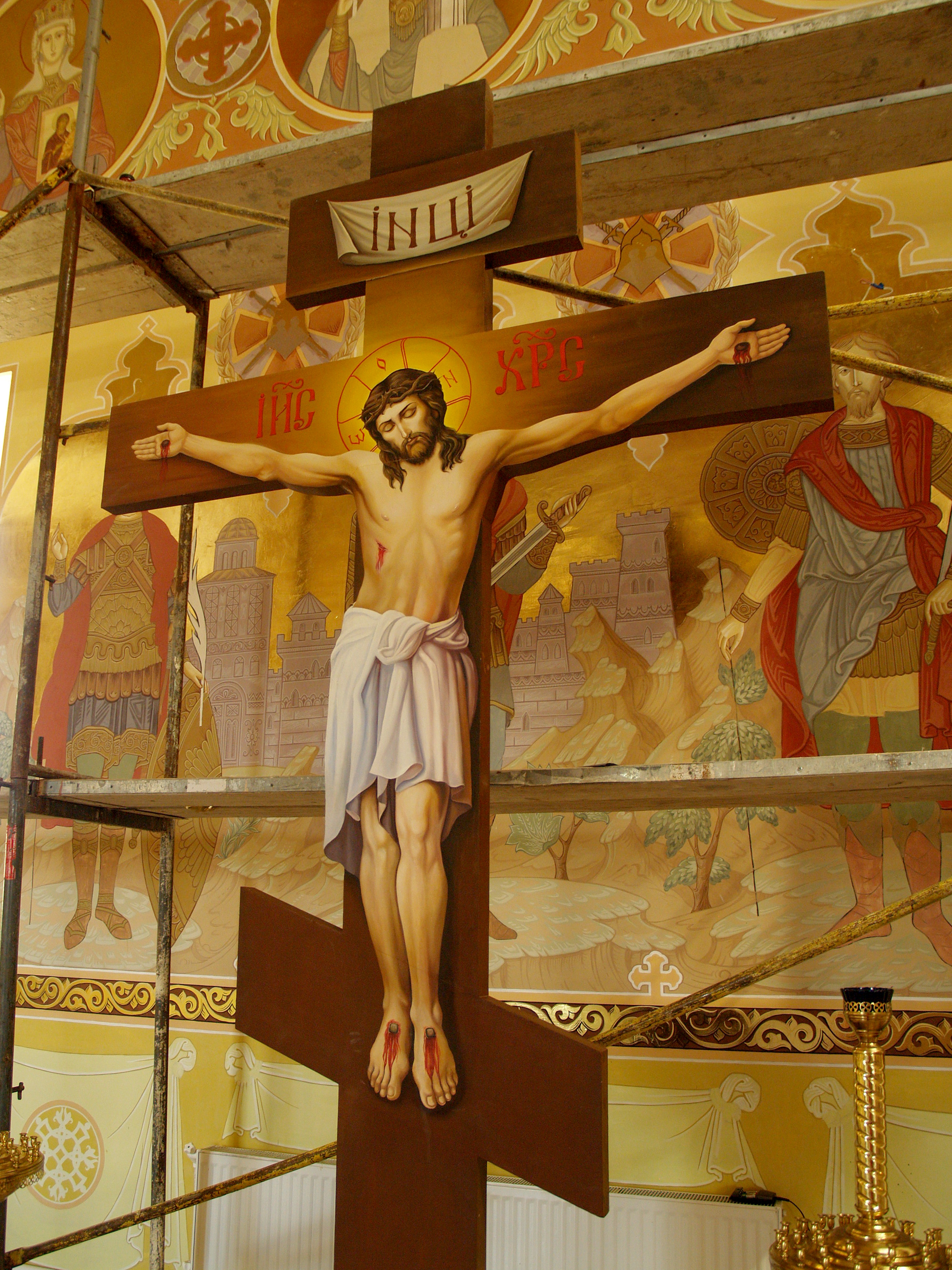
Saint Alexander Nevsky church in Bender

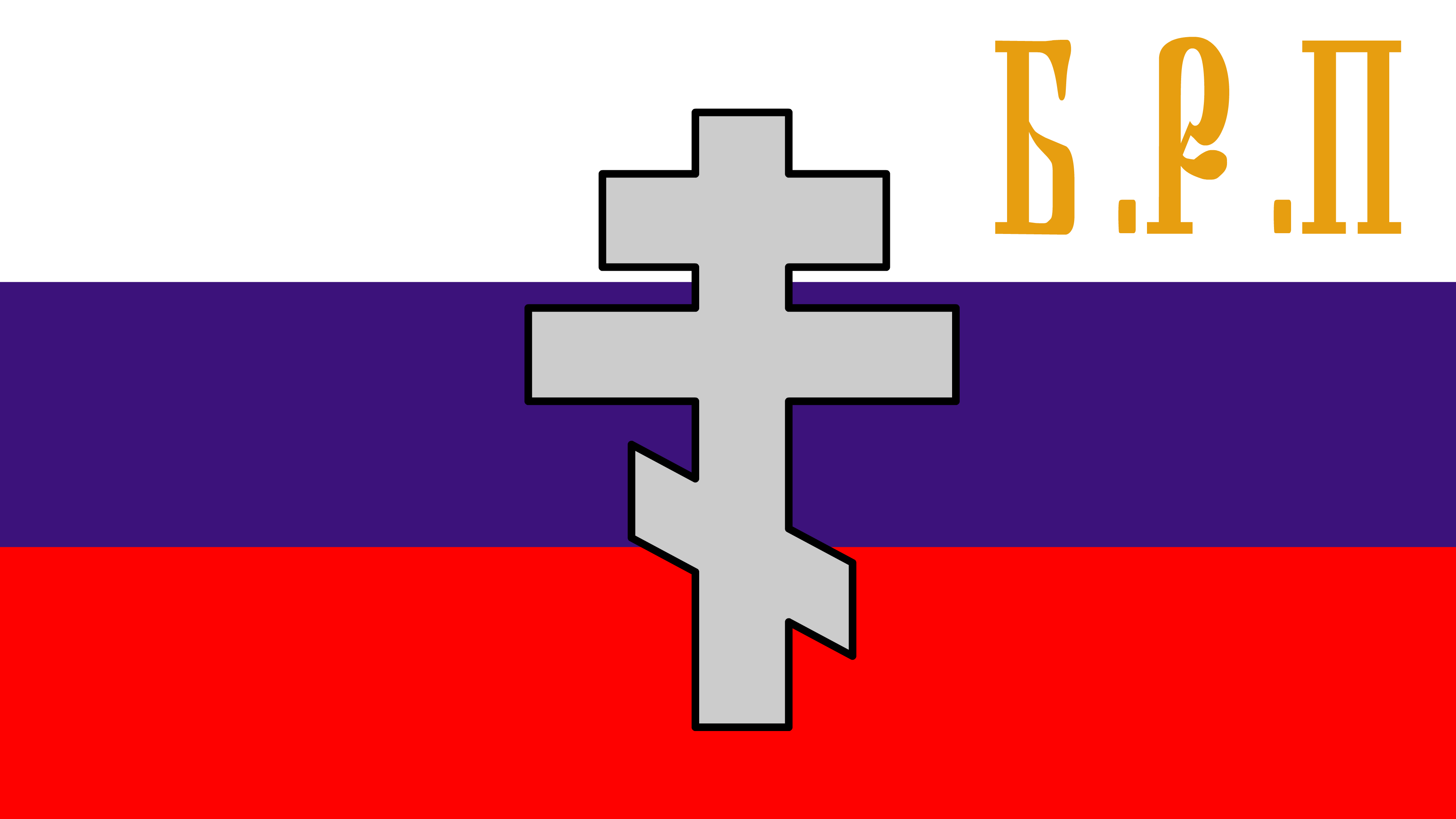
Flag of the Brotherhood of Russian Truth

USVA Headstone Emblem 5 "Russian Orthodox cross"

== See also ==
- Cross of Lorraine
