= Troll cross =

Marked cross purported to ward off malevolent magic

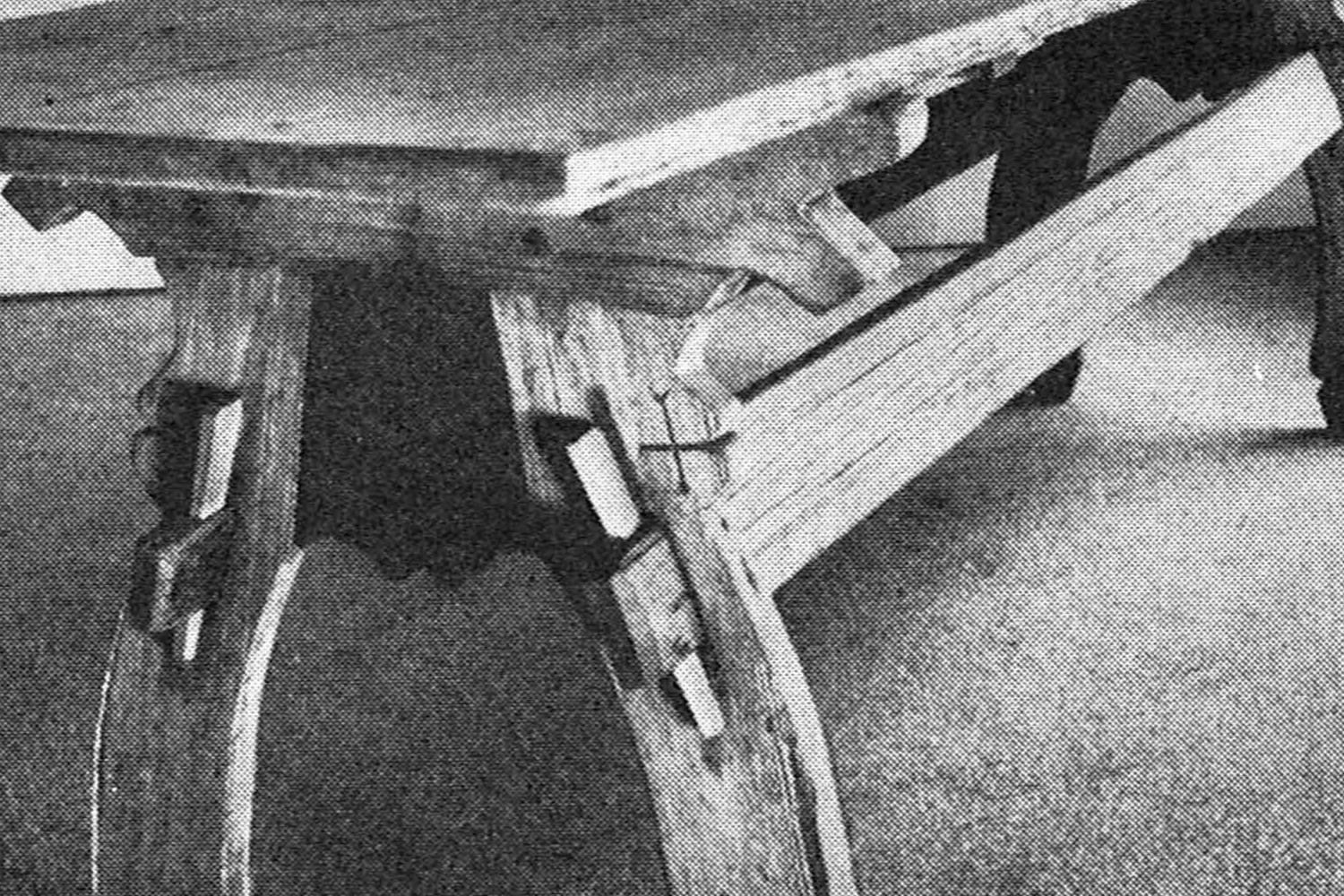
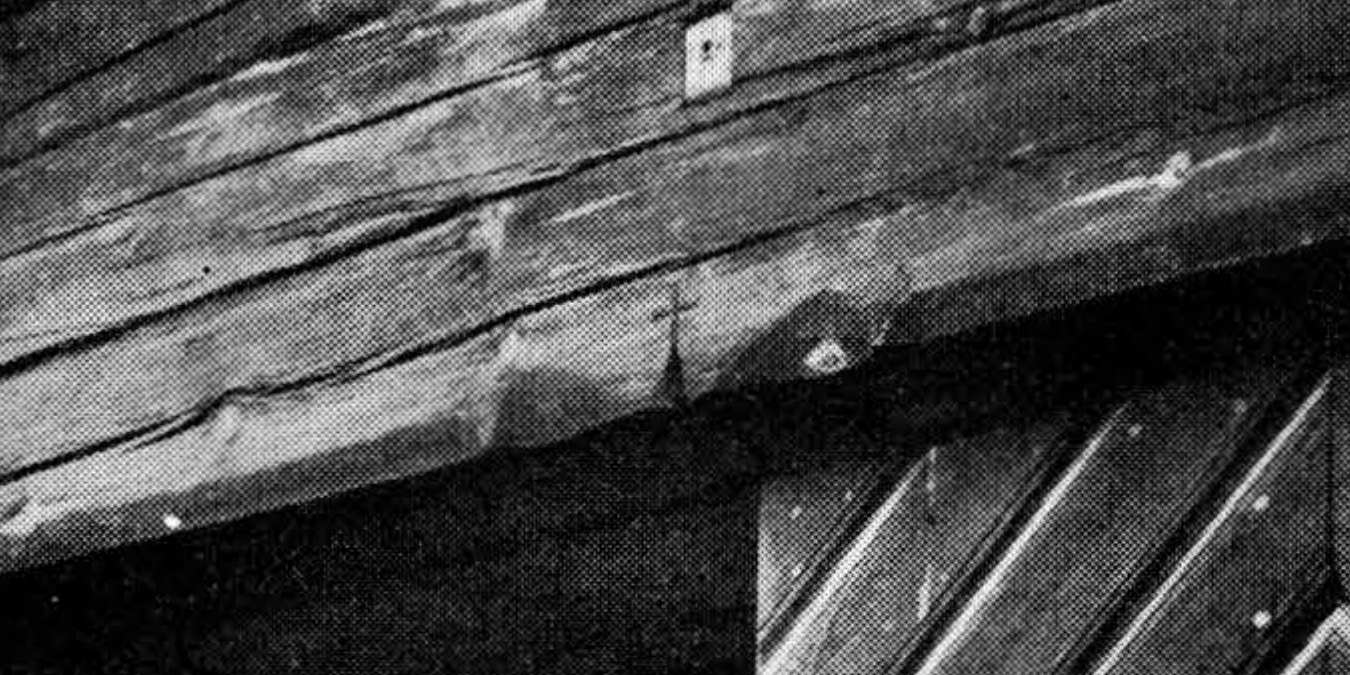
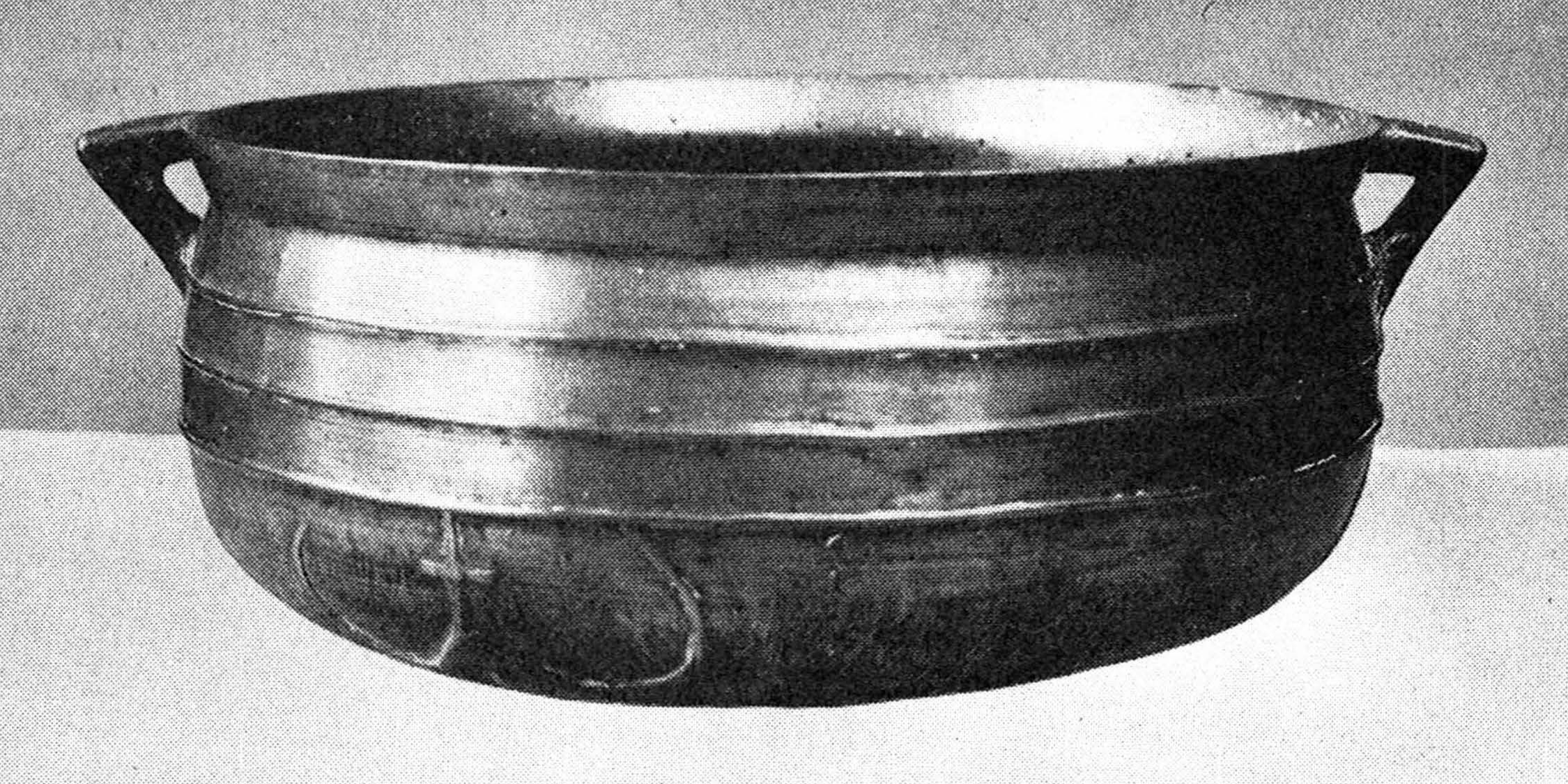
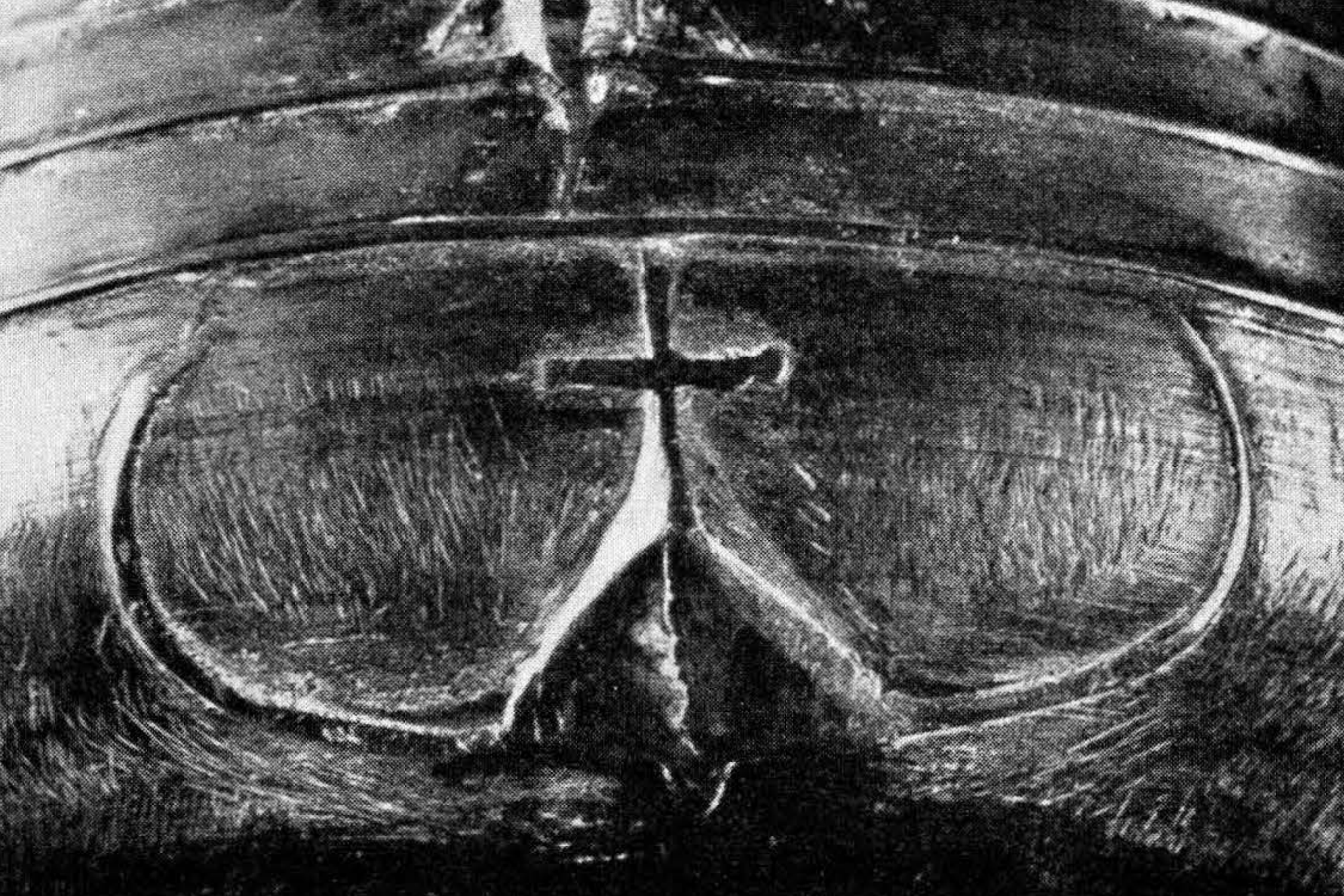
- Top left: Troll cross on a table
- Top right: Troll cross on a portal
- Lower left: Troll cross on a pot
- Lower right: Troll cross flanked by horns

In Sweden (and potentially Norway), a troll cross (Norwegian & Swedish: trollkors) is an old superstitious protection sigil to ward off evil or malevolent supernatural powers and creatures, etc, from entering households to harm people or their belongings. It consists of a cross carved into or by other means decorated onto an object, sometimes featuring further magical ornamentation, such as being flanked by two giant horns.

== Name ==
The lead "troll" in the name does not inherently refer to trolls in their modern sense, but rather esoteric or black magic. Compare Swedish: trollkarl (lit. 'troll man', "magician"), trolleri, trolldom, trollkonst, etc (lit. 'trollery', 'troll art', "magic, sorcery, witchcraft"), trolla ("to execute magic").

If the name is old, it could stem from the older sense of troll, meaning something akin to "supernatural malevolent creature", which was used to describe anything fitting the description, including giants, ghosts and devils.

== Use ==
Troll crosses mainly stem from middle Sweden, primarily Uppland, being used up until the early 20th century. They belong to an old superstitious belief system and folklore, common in rural parts of the country before modern times.

While the cross-symbol is likely Christian in nature, the practice of decorating objects with symbols for supernatural protection purposes and thereof likely stems from pagan roots, based on various other similar finds and surviving practices which can be linked with descriptions found in Icelandic Sagas, such as horse heads.

Similar practices are also known from medieval buildings in Norway.

== Practices ==
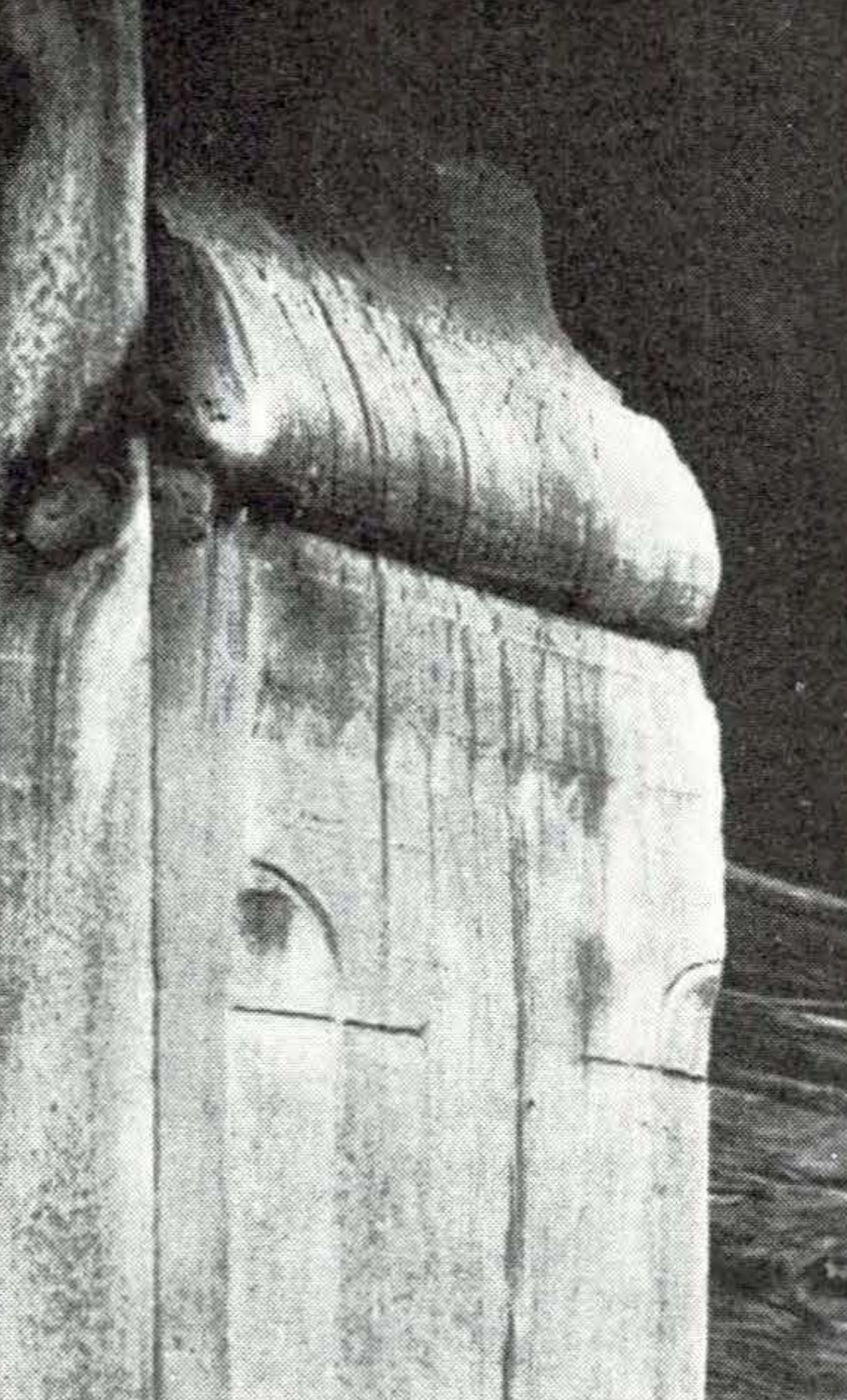
Troll crosses on a carriage house gate post.

Troll crosses were often put onto entrances, such as above a door or a window etc, or on posts and the like by an entrance. Decorated objects, like tables, have featured up to 9–10 crosses.

A common theme has also been to protect food. Troll crosses have been seen applied to cast metal cookware, probably via the mold. Crosses could also be cut onto loafs of bread when baking and some home mills even let the grain pour through a hole garnished with crosses.

Beyond symbols, phrases and practices were also used among food. When breaking a cookie, one was supposed to say Gud signe ("God bless"). Protecting milk products was seen as important. Before selling milk, a burning match was put into the milk to protect it.

== Kari Erlands' troll cross ==
In modern times, a new take on the troll cross has been popularised, especially in neopagan circles, taking the form of a looped piece of iron bent so that the ends "cross" each other, with inward going curls decorating the ends, worn as an amulet around the neck or as a bracelet. Beyond making up a superficial cross where the looped pieces meet, the material of iron is relevant to Nordic folklore, where trolls are said to be afraid or allergic to iron.

It was first created as an item of jewellery by the smith Kari Erlands from western Dalarna, Sweden, sometime in the late 1990s. It was claimed to have been a copy of a protective rune found at her grandparents' farm, but this has not been verified. While it does bear some resemblance to the othala rune ᛟ found in Elder and Anglo-Saxon futhark, it is more likely that Erlands mistook a house mark for a protective symbol.

Erlands' troll cross symbol

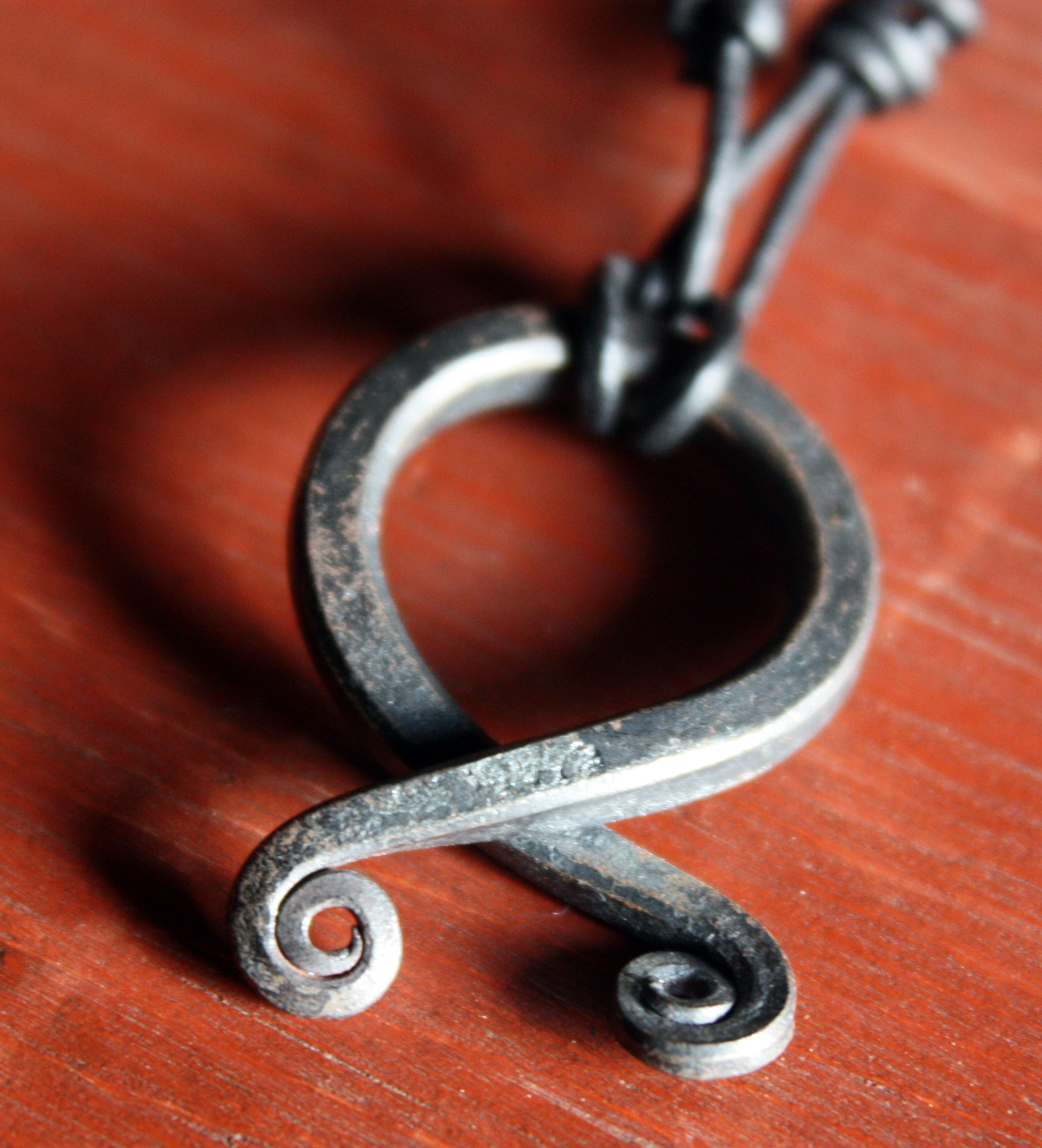
Erlands' troll cross as an amulet
