= Russian cross (religion) =

Cross with 2 horizontal crossbeams, with the lower one slanted

Russian cross

The Russian cross is a variation of the Christian cross with two crossbeams, of which the higher one is horizontal and longer, and the lower one is diagonal.

At the Moscow church council in 1654 the patriarch Nikon of Moscow promoted the decision to replace the eight-pointed Orthodox cross (☦) with the six-pointed Russian cross, but that move combined with some other changes resulted in the raskol (schism) of the Russian Orthodox Church. In the 19th century the Russian cross was used on the coat of arms of the Kherson Governorate in the Russian empire, where it was named the "Russian cross". In the Russian Orthodox Church, the inclination of the lower crossbar of the Russian Orthodox cross is viewed as the crossbar of the balance, one point of which is raised as a sign of the penitent thief. The other crucified thief, who blasphemed at Jesus Christ, is indicated by the lower point of the crossbar, tilted downward.

== Gallery ==
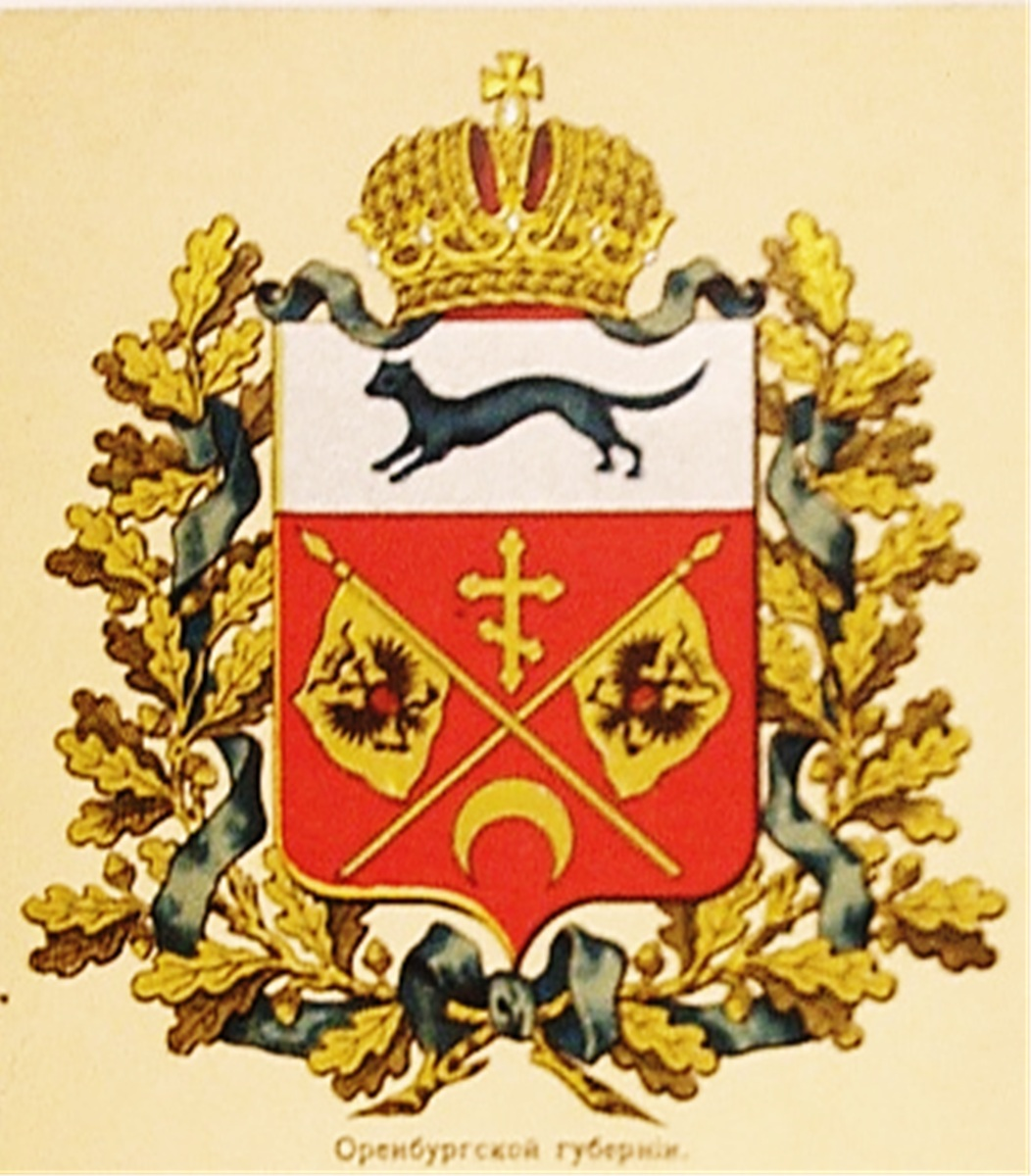
On the coat of arms of the Orenburg Governorate (1856)

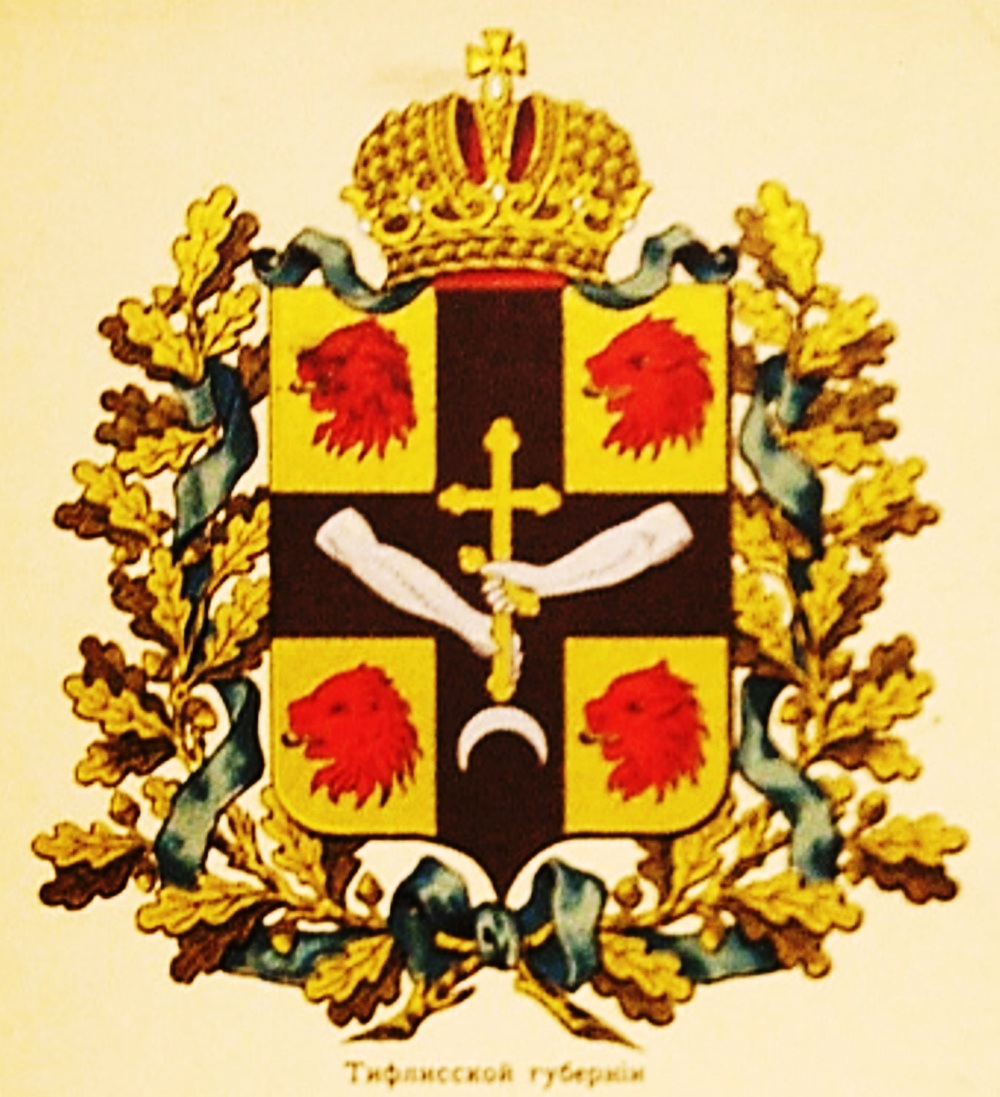
Coat of arms of the Tiflis Governorate (1878, Russian empire)

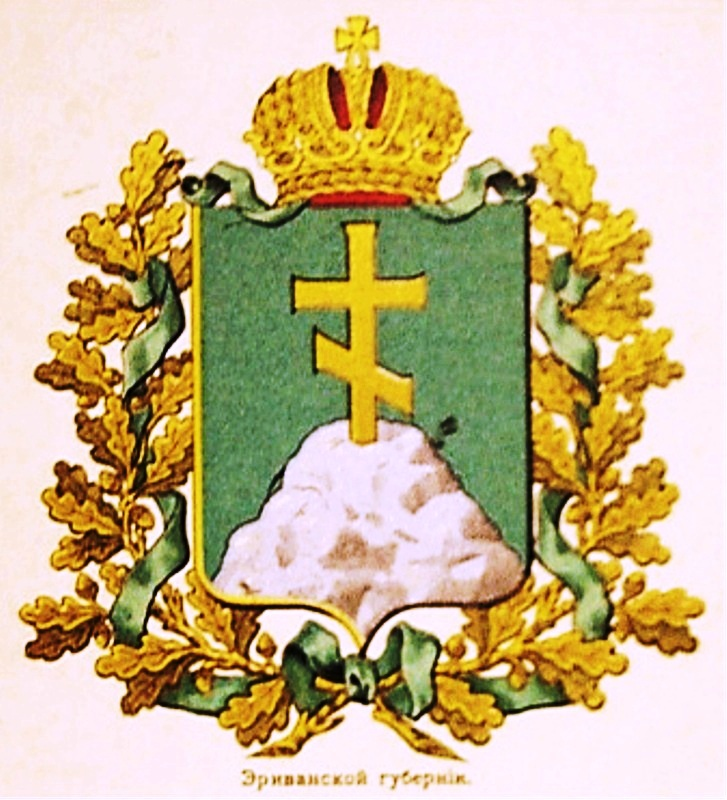
Coat of arms of the Erivan Governorate (1878)

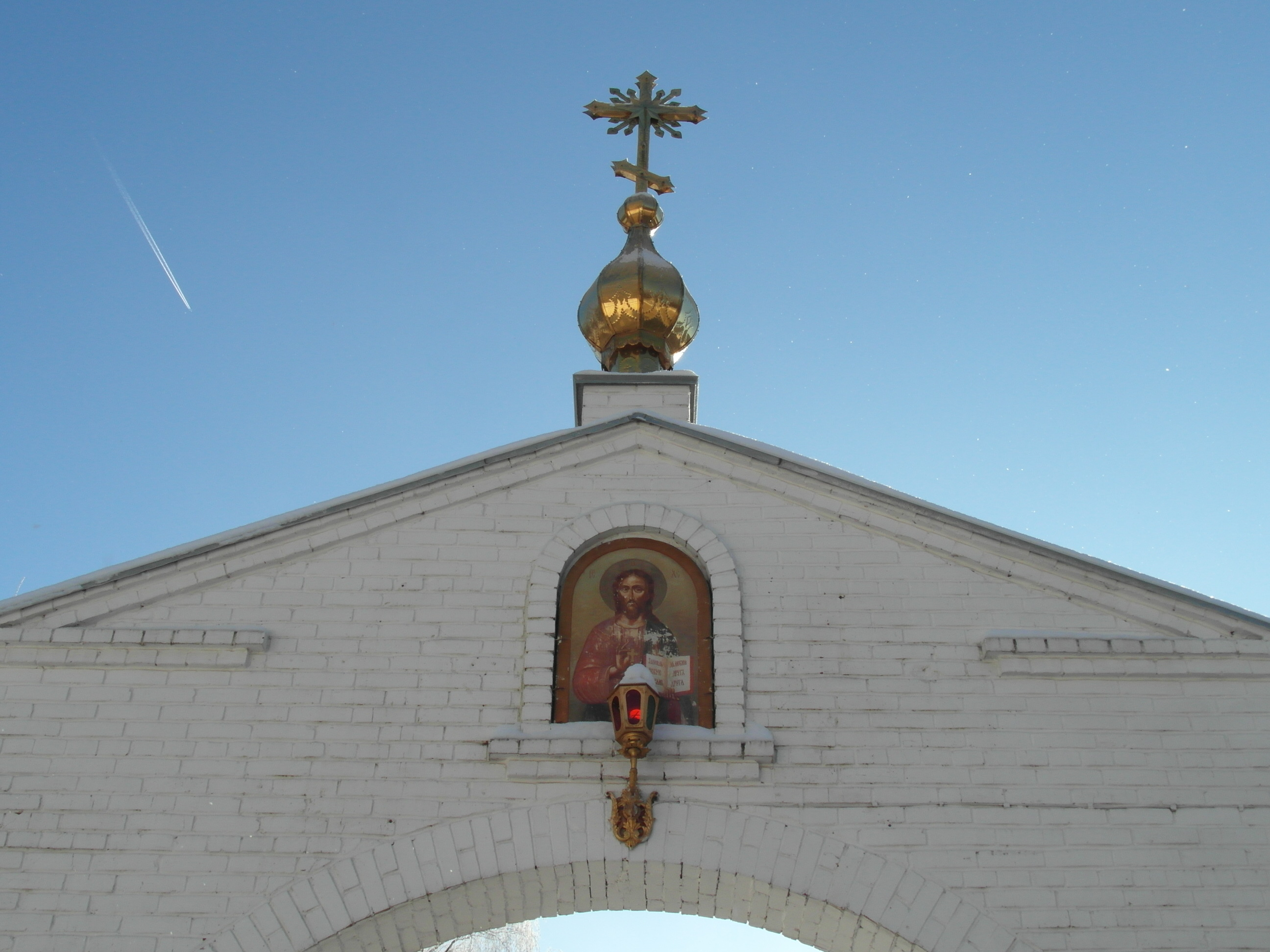
At the entrance of the monastery in Novomoskovsk, Russia (2014)

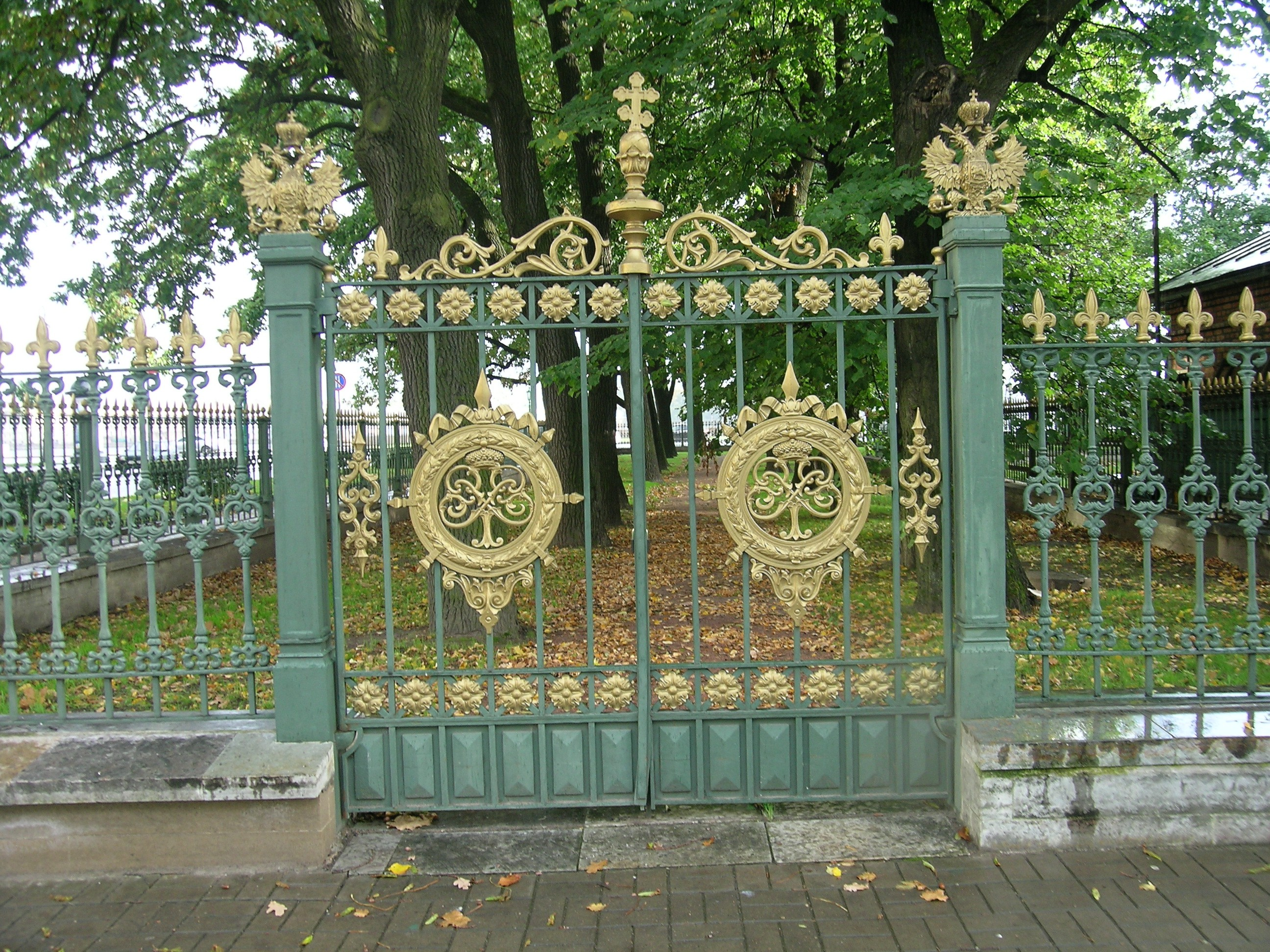
In Saint Petersburg (2010)

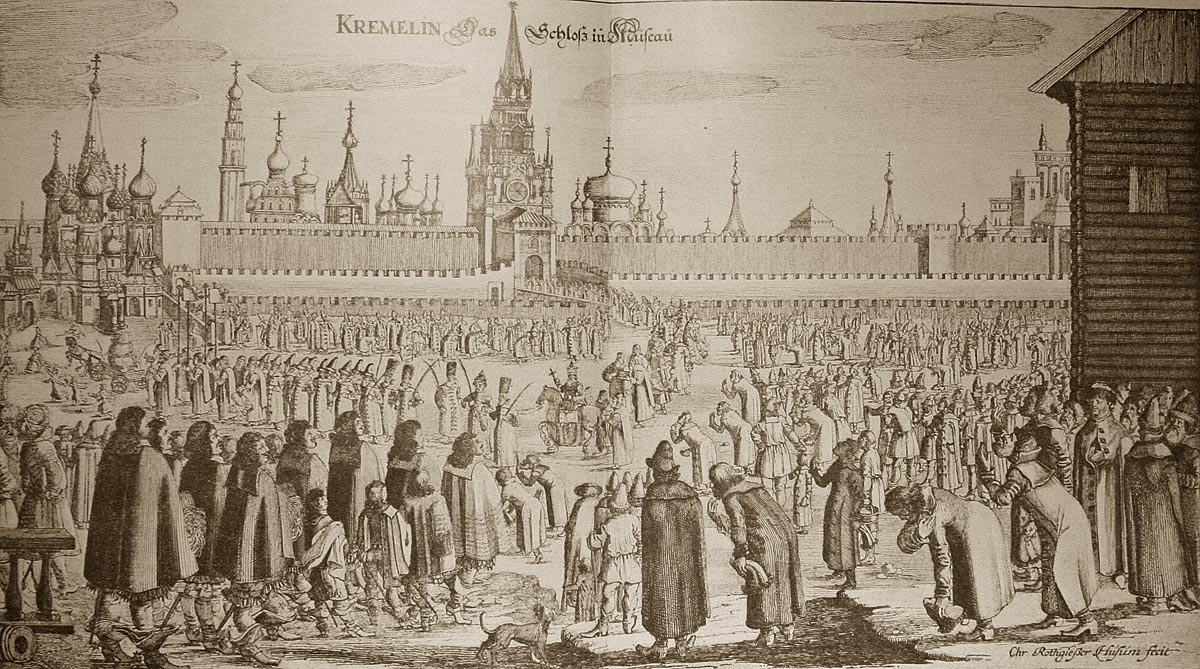
The 17th century Moscow's Kremlin by Adam Olearius
