= Macedonian Cross =

Macedonian Christian cross variant

The Macedonian Cross

The Macedonian Cross (Macedonian: Македонски крст, Makedonski krst), also known as Veljusa Cross (Вељушки крст, Veljuški krst; or Cross from Veljusa (Крстот од Вељуса, Krstot od Veljusa)) and Strumica Cross (Струмички крст, Strumički krst), is a variation of the Christian cross which is mainly connected with the Christianity in North Macedonia. The cross is a symbol of the Macedonian Orthodox Church. The cross can be found on many churches in North Macedonia, it is displayed on the coat of arms of the Macedonian Orthodox Church, and the cross is the main element of the "Holy Macedonian Cross Table Medal" of the Macedonian Orthodox Church.

== History ==
The cross was first displayed in the "Holy Mother of God" church in Veljusa Monastery near Strumica. It is known that the church was built in 1085 AD. The cross has been painted on the facade of the church. At the beginning, this cross was associated with the monastery and Strumica Region, but later it became a well known symbol of the Church of Macedonia.

== Gallery ==
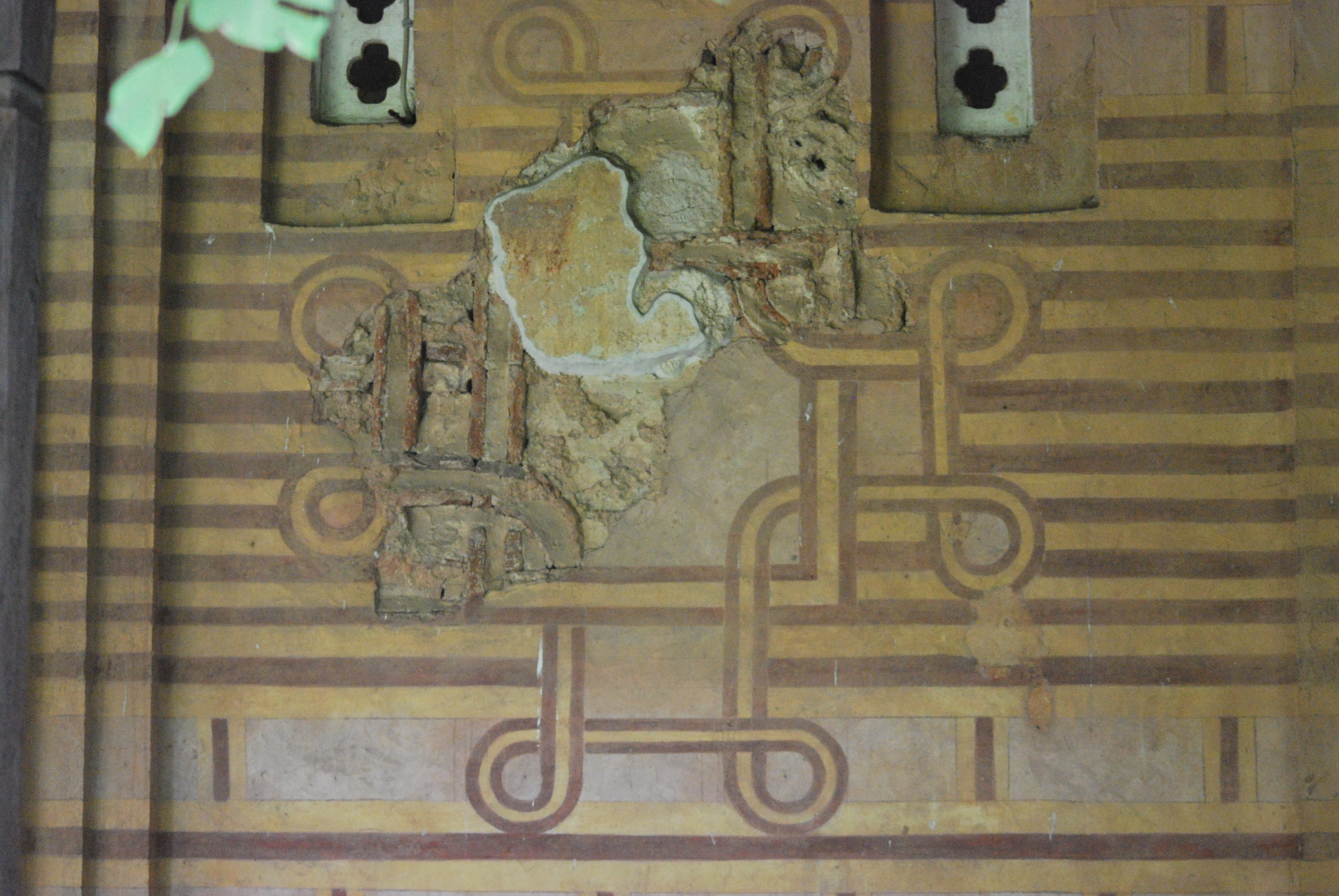
The cross on the facade of the church in Veljusa Monastery

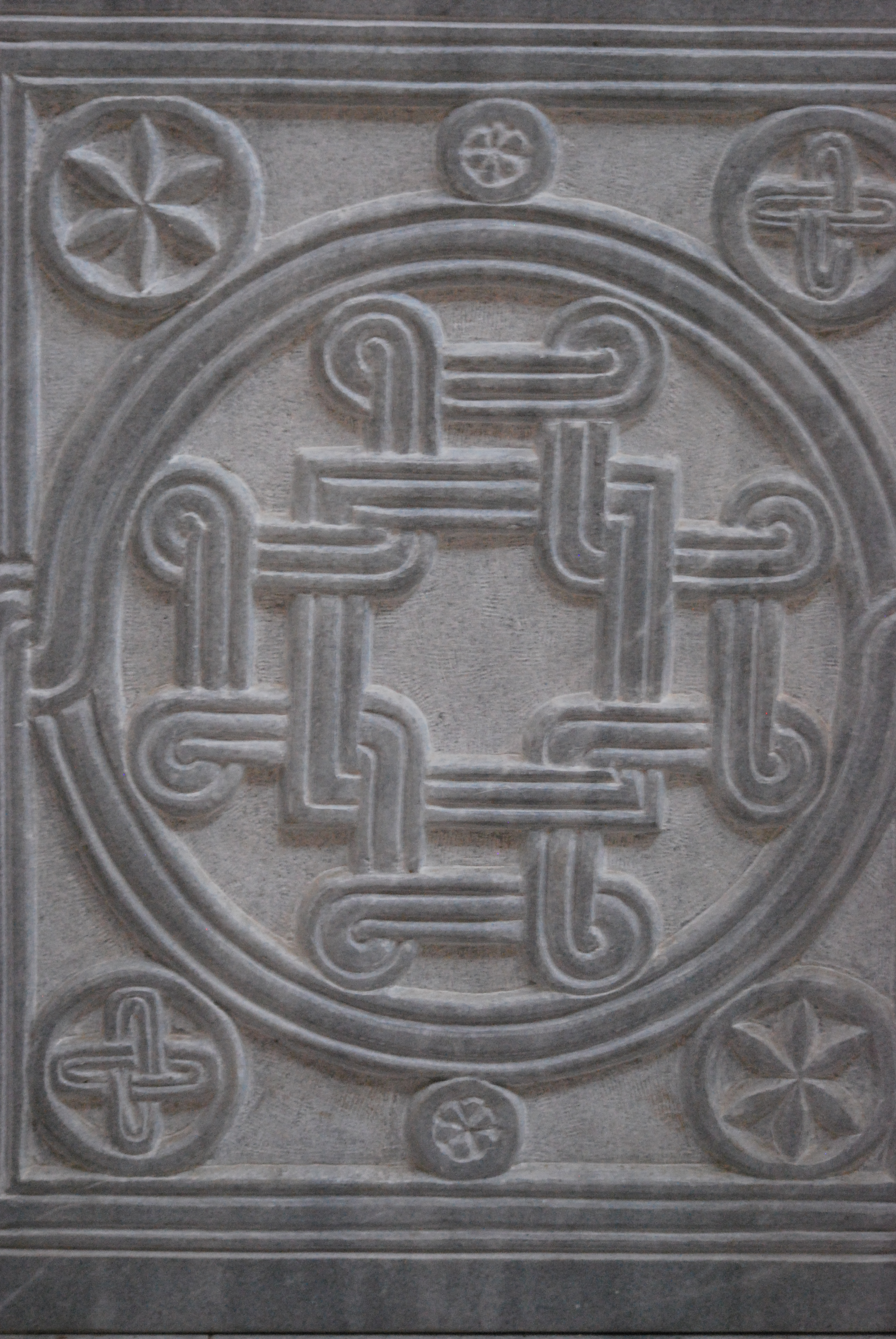
The cross in Vodoča Monastery.

Macedonian cross alternate

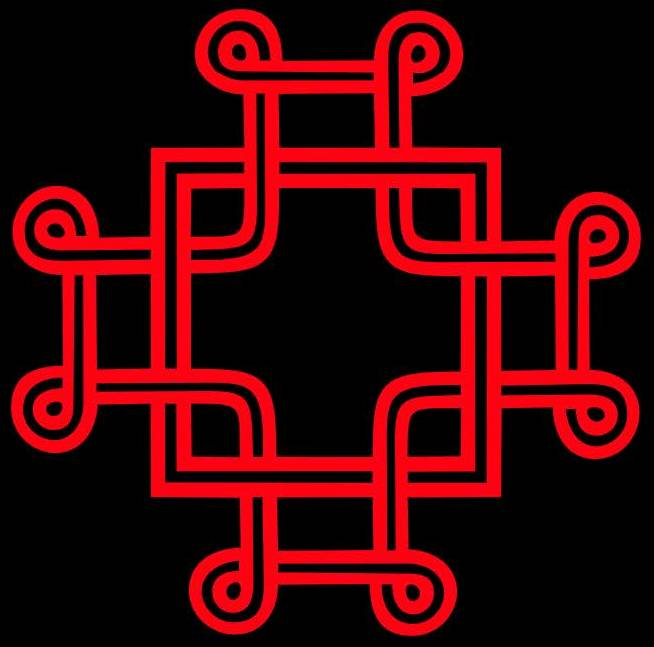
Other variants

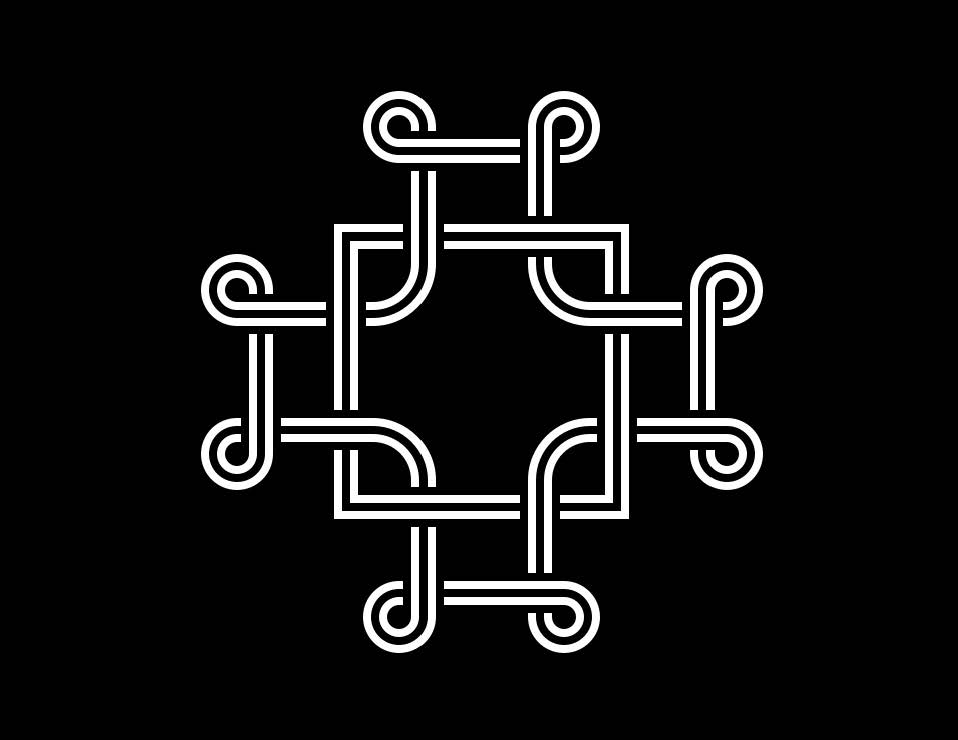
Macedonian Cross, white, black background
