= Trubetsky coat of arms =

Ruthenian-Polish-Russian coat of arms

Trubetsky
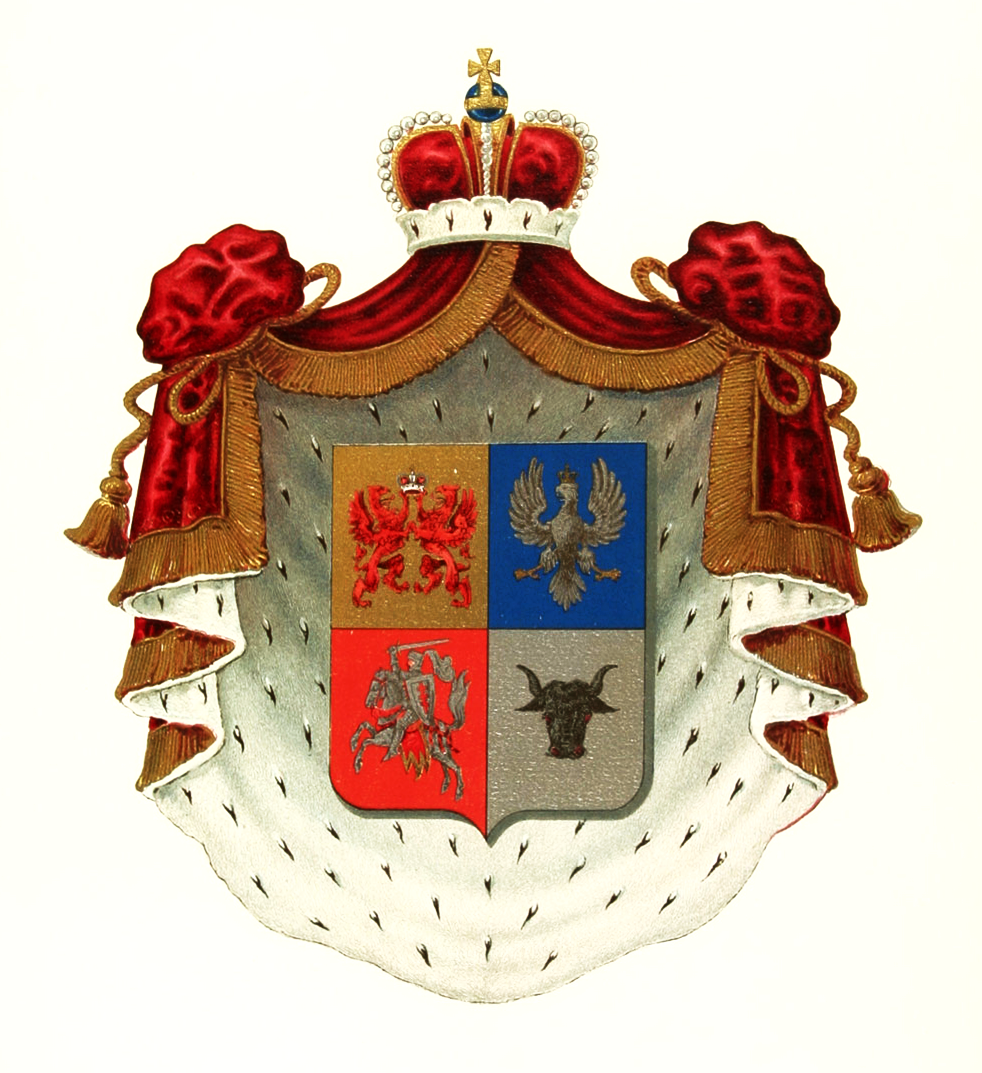
- Alternative names: Troubetzkoy, Trubecki, Trubic, Трубецкой
- Earliest mention: 1357
- Towns: Trubetsk
- Families: Trubetsky

Trubetsky is a Ruthenian-Polish-Russian coat of arms. It has been used by the Trubetsky family.

== History ==
The Trubetsky coat of arms consist of four parts:

Coats of arms of Latgale and Inflanty which become the Coat of arms of Latvia.

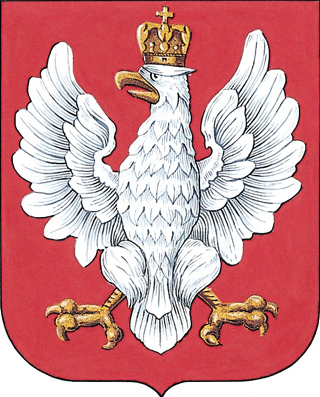
Coat of arms of the Kingdom of Poland.

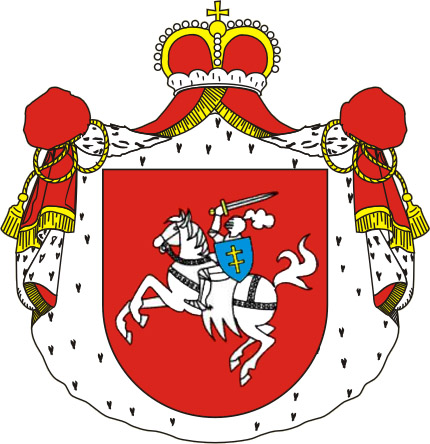
Coat of arms of the Grand Duchy of Lithuania.

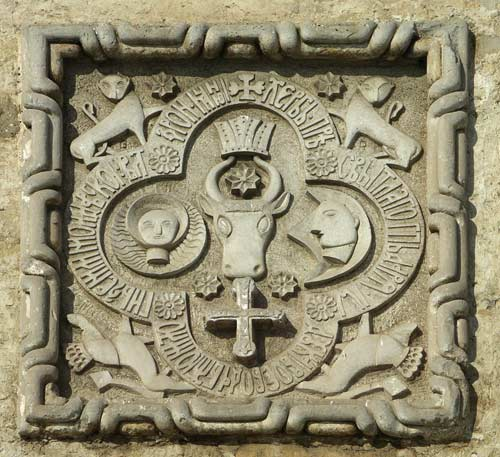
Coat of arms of the Principality of Moldavia, at the Cetăţuia Monastery in Iaşi.

== Notable bearers ==
Notable bearers of this coat of arms include:

- Demetriusz I Starszy
- Wigund-Jeronym Trubecki
- Piotr Trubecki
- Ivan Bolshoy Troubetzkoy
- Nikita Trubetskoy
- Sergei Petrovich Troubetzkoy
- Nester Trubecki
- Pierre Troubetzkoy
- Paolo Troubetzkoy
- Yury Nolden
- Tõnu Trubetsky
- Wladimir Troubetzkoy

== See also ==
- Pogoń Litewska
- Belarusian heraldry
- Polish heraldry
- Coat of arms
