= Wigund-Jeronym Trubecki =

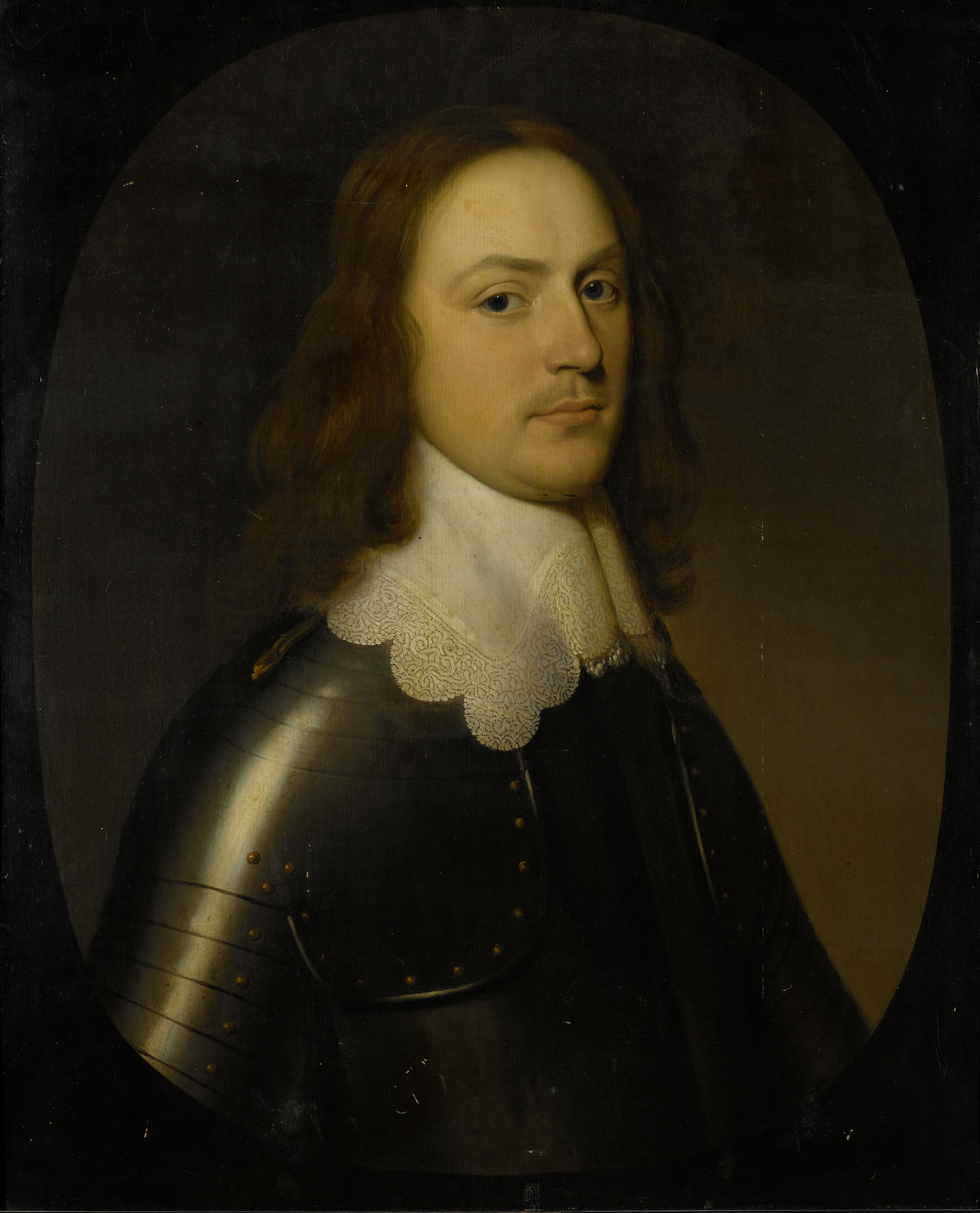

Prince of Trubetsk
- Reign: 1611–1634
- Predecessor: Symeon Iwanowicz Perski Trubecki
- Successor: Piotr Trubecki & Aleksander Trubecki
- Born: c. 1572
- Died: 1634; Smolensk??
- Burial: Church of the Transfiguration in Trubetsk
- Spouse: N Michałowna Sołtykowa
- Issue: Piotr Trubecki, Aleksander Trubecki
- Religion: Roman Catholic

Wigund-Jeronym Trubecki or Yuri Nikitich Trubetsky as he was called earlier in Muscovy (Russian: Юрий Никитич Трубецкой; c. 1572 – 1634) was the Prince of Trubetsk from 1611 to 1634, preceded by Symeon Iwanowicz Perski Trubecki, succeeded by Piotr Trubecki, and Aleksander Trubecki. Yuri Nikitich Trubetsky was also a boyar and equestrian of False Dmitry II. After emigrating to Poland, and restoring The Principality of Trubetsk, he converted to Catholicism, and took the name Wigund-Jeronym Trubecki.

== Biography ==
He was the eldest son of the governor and boyar Prince Ioann Nikita Romanovich Kosoj Trubetsky, who died in January 1608, and his wife Jevdokia Mikhailovna Trubetskaya, who died in 1629. In the male line – a 10th generation descendant of Gediminas of Lithuania, the King of Lithuania. His brothers were Feodor Nikitich Trubetsky, and Afanasy Alexey Nikitich Trubetsky, Sovereign of Trubetsk from 1660 to 1672. Prince Yuri Nikitich Trubetsky, as he was called in the earlier life, began his service at the tsarist court of Feodor I of Russia in the rank of rynda and stolnik. It was first mentioned in October 1592, when he was deputy to Prince Andrei Ivanovich Nogtyov-Suzdalsky, and his son Daniil Andreyevich Nogtyov-Suzdalsky, with his father boyar Prince Nikita Romanovich Trubetsky. In 1595 the stolnik Prince Trubetsky attended in a dinner with Tsar Feodor Ioannovich in honor of the German ambassadors.

In October 1596, Prince Trubetsky was "the first rynda in the white coat" during the reception of the Lithuanian ambassador Jan Radziwiłłowicz Gołubicki at Tsar Feodor Ioannovich. In May 1597, Prince Trubetsky was "the first rynda in the white coat" with Tsar Feodor Ioannovich in the Palace of Facets. Prince Ivan Semyonovich Kurakin was appointed as the second rynda. The Tsar supported Prince Trubetsky in the parochial dispute, and he dismissed Prince I. S. Kurakin.

In July 1597, during the reception of the Austrian ambassador Burgrave Abraham Donawski with Tsar Feodor Ioannovich, Prince Trubetsky was the first rynda again. In August 1597 Prince Trubetsky was again the first rynda with the Tsarist person. In 1598 Prince Trubetsky was a rynda "at the Big Saadak" during the campaign of the new Tsar Boris Godunov to Serpukhov against the Crimean Tatars. His father, boyar Nikita Romanovich, was left in the boyar commission in Moscow under the young Tsarevich Feodor Borisovich. In August 1599, Prince Trubetsky was "the first rynda in the white coat" under the Tsar Boris Godunov during the reception of Prince Gustav of Sweden (1568–1607). Then, on the Tsar's instructions, the stolnik Trubetsky "went with a drink from The Sovereign, after the table" to the Swedish Prince. In October 1601, Prince Trubetsky was the first rynda to the Tsar Boris Godunov during the reception of the Danish embassy.

In September 1602, Prince Trubetsky was appointed to the second rynda with the Tsar during the ceremonial reception of the Danish Prince Johann of Schleswig-Holstein (1583–1602), the groom of the Princess Xenia Borisovna. Prince Ivan Mikhailovich Katyrev-Rostovsky was appointed the first rynda there. And Trubetsky’s uncle boyar Prince Timofey Romanovich Trubetsky had said before the Sovereign: "It is good for my nephew to be with Prince Ivan Katyrev". Prince Trubetsky, together with Prince Vasily Ivanovich Kurlyatev attended a dinner in honor the Danish Prince in the Palace of Facets. In February 1604, Trubetsky attended the tsarist dinner in the front hut. Also in 1604, Trubetsky and Roman Fedorovich Troyekurov attended the tsarist dinner in honor of the British ambassador.

After Boris Godunov's death in 1605, False Dmitry I made a triumphal entrance into Moscow and was crowned tsar on 21 July. He consolidated power by visiting the tomb of Ivan the Terrible and the convent of Ivan's widow, Maria Nagaya, who accepted Dimitry as her son and confirmed his story. In May 1606, Prince Trubetsky was "the first rynda in the white coat" to False Dmitry I during the receptions of the Sandomierz voivode Jerzy Mniszech and the Polish embassy under the leadership of Mikołaj Oleśnicki, and Aleksander Korwin Gosiewski.

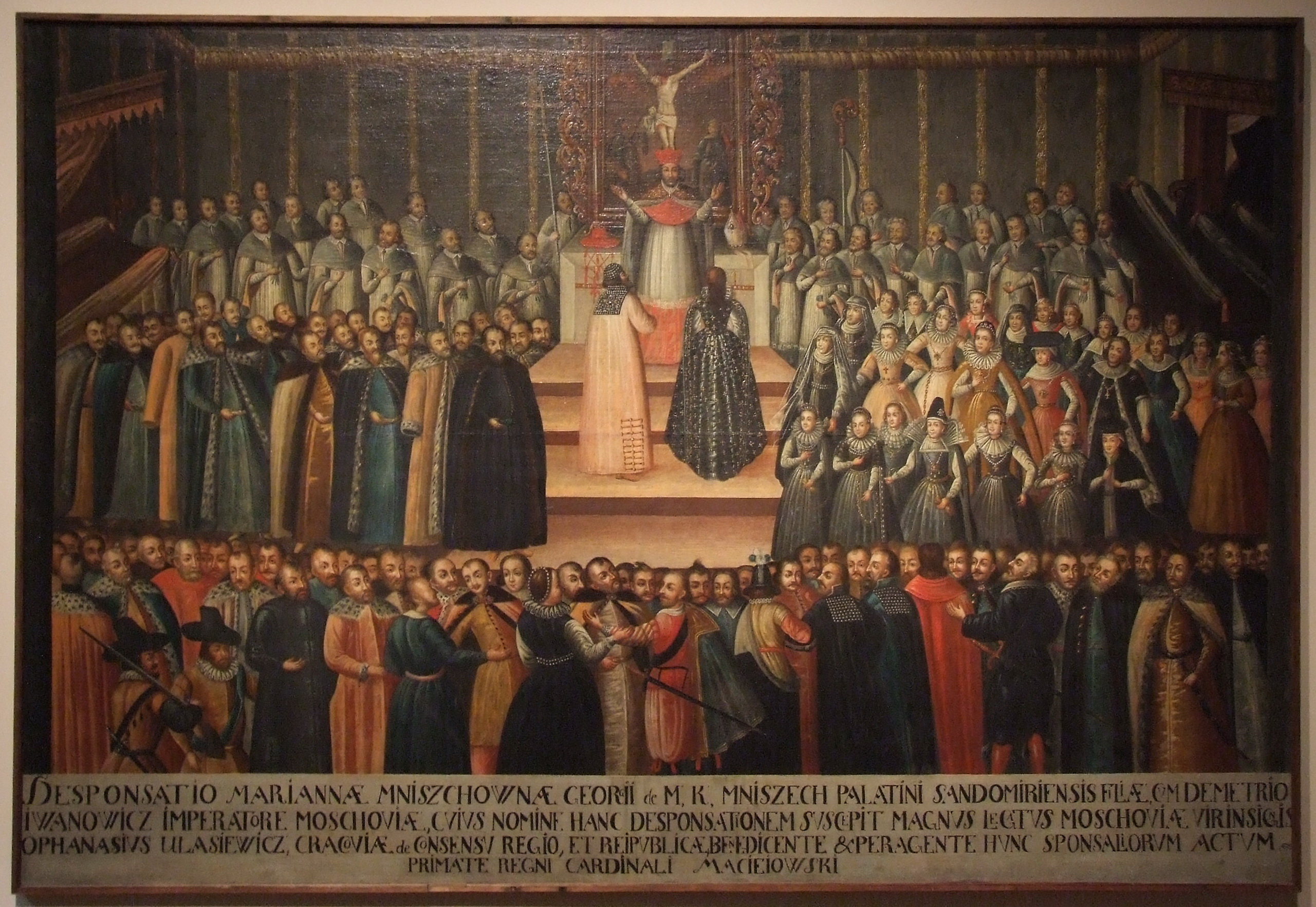
The betrothal in absentia of Marina Mniszech and False Dmitry I in Kraków on 12 November 1605.

On 8 May 1606, during the wedding of the Tsar False Dmitry I with a Polish szlachta lady Marina Mniszech, Prince Trubetsky was "the first rynda in the white coat".

On 17 May 1606, ten days after the marriage, Dmitry was murdered by armed mobs in Moscow after he was ousted from the Kremlin. Many of his advisors were also murdered or imprisoned. From 1606 to 1608 on the side of the Tsar Vasily Shuisky he took part of the battles against Bolotnikovites, Polish-Lithuanian invaders and supporters of False Dmitry II. In 1606 Prince Trubetsky was the first voivode of the guard regiment in the tsarist army under the command of the Princes Fyodor Ivanovich Mstislavsky and Mikhail Fyodorovich Kashin-Obolensky under Serpukhov. In autumn of the same 1606 the Tsar Vasily Shuisky sent an army of three regiments to the punitive campaign against the rebellious Severia. The big regiment was led by Prince Trubetsky, and boyar Mikhail Alexandrovich Nagoy, forward regiment by the Princes Boris Mikhailovich Lykov-Obolensky and Yakov Petrovich Baryatinsky, the guard regiment by the Princes Grigory Petrovich Romodanovsky and Roman Ivanovich Gagarin. In the Battle of Kromy the tsarist army was defeated by the rebel army under the command of Ivan Isaevich Bolotnikov and Yuri Bezzubtsev. The chief governors, Trubetsky and boyar Mikhail Alexandrovich Nagoy, with the remnants of the regiments retreated to Oryol, and from there to Moscow.

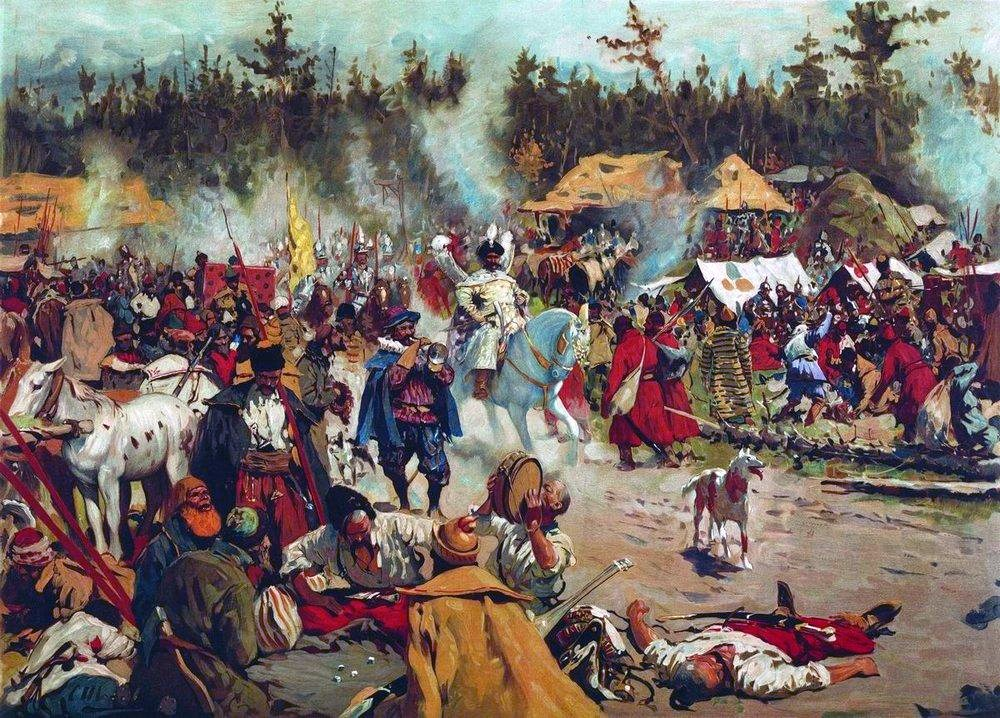
At the Time of Troubles by Sergey Vasilyevich Ivanov (1908).

In the summer of 1608, and after the unsuccessful battles near Moscow, the Princes Trubetsky, Ivan Mikhailovich Katyrev-Rostovsky and Ivan Fedorovich Troekurov tried to go over to the side of False Dmitry II, but were captured and sent to exile. Trubetsky was exiled to Totma, from where he soon escaped to the Tushino camp. False Dmitry II appointed Prince Trubetsky to boyar and Master of the Horse, that was the head of The Конюшенный приказ (Stable order). On 28 February 1609, Vasily Shuisky signed the Treaty of Vyborg with the King Charles IX of Sweden, establishing the military alliance with the Polish-Lithuanian Commonwealth's main rival. Russia agreed to cede Korela Fortress and Kexholm County to Sweden in exchange of military assistance in fighting False Dmitry II and the Polish. The Swedish launched the De la Gardie Campaign commanded by Jacob De la Gardie and Evert Horn, consisting of a 5,000 man force to assist the Russians under Mikhail Skopin-Shuisky. In response, King Sigismund formally declared war on Russia, hoping to gain territorial concessions and to weaken the ally of Sweden, and Polish troops crossed the Russian borders to Siege of Smolensk (1609–11). In January 1610, after the end of the Tushino camp and the escape of False Dmitry II to Kaluga, the Tushino boyars sent an embassy under the leadership of boyar Mikhail Glebovich Saltykov and Prince Trubetsky to Sigismund III Vaza, the King of Poland, who situated under Smolensk. In February of the same year, the Tushino embassy signed an agreement with the King of Poland to elect his eldest son Władysław IV Vasa to the tsarist throne of Russia. Sigismund III Vaza approved the Tushino boyars behind Prince Trubetsky. Under Smolensk Mikhail Glebovich Saltykov and Trubetsky took an oath of allegiance to Władysław IV Vasa, as the new Tsar of Russia. Then they returned to Moscow and began to cooperate with the boyar government of Seven Boyars. The Swedish-Russian alliance’ failure against the Polish saw their defeat at the Battle of Klushino on 4 July 1610, ending the campaign. Vasily Shuysky was forced to abdicate by the Seven Boyars after the Battle of Klushino, but before False Dmitri II could gain the throne, the Polish commander Stanisław Żółkiewski put forward a rival candidate: Sigismund's son, Prince Władysław, who was popular with the pro-Polish faction of the Russian boyars. The people of Moscow swore allegiance to him on condition of maintaining Orthodoxy and granting certain privileges to them.

On this compromise, the Muscovites allowed Polish troops enter the city and occupy the Kremlin, and the Seven Boyars accepted Władysław as the Tsar of Russia in September 1610. False Dmitry II campaign ended when he was killed on 11 December 1610. In January 1611, after the death of False Dmitry II, who was killed in December 1610 by a serving Tatar murza Pyotr Arslanovich Urusov in Kaluga, the boyar government sent the delegation to Kaluga under the leadership of Prince Trubetsky, appointed as the new voivode of Kaluga. He had to convince the former Tushino people to kiss the cross of allegiance to Prince Władysław Vasa. According to official documents, the majority of Tushinians recognized the authority of Prince Władysław. However, in the «Книга глаголемая Новый летописец», it was asserted that the former residents of Tushino agreed to take the oath to Prince Władysław only then he will arrive to Moscow. The chronicle claims the Kaluga residents took Prince Trubetsky to prison, from where he did escape. Władysław's reign was interrupted when Sigismund opposed the compromise, deciding to take the throne for himself and to convert Russia to Roman Catholic. Sigismund's actions aroused anti-Catholic and anti-Polish sentiment in Russia, and infuriated the pro-Polish boyars who supported him. Sweden strongly disapproved of the move as they were fighting the Polish–Swedish wars on the Baltic Coast, ending their military alliance and declaring the war on Russia. The Swedes started the Ingrian War and began supporting the False Dmitry III, who came from the Duchy of Estonia (1561–1721) to Ivangorod. By this time Russia was effectively a failed state: the throne was vacant, the nobility quarrelled among themselves, the Orthodox Patriarch Hermogenes was imprisoned, the Catholic Poles occupied the Moscow Kremlin, Smolensk was still being besieged, and the Protestant Swedes occupied Novgorod. Tens of thousands died in battles and riots as enormous bands of brigands swarmed everywhere, and continuing Tatar raids left the southern borderlands of Russia completely depopulated and devastated. From 17 to 19 March 1611, the Polish garrison in Kremlin was besieged by the First Volunteer Army led by Prokopy Lyapunov, the governor of Ryazan, but the poorly armed militia failed to take the fortress. The militia soon fell into disorder and the Cossack leader Ivan Zarutsky murdered Lyapunov.

== Struggle for independence ==
In October 1611, the Prince Yuri, together with his father-in-law, boyar Mikhail Glebovich Saltykov, headed the embassy from the provisional government of Semboyarshchina to the Rzeczpospolita. The ambassadors should ask Sigismund III Vaza to send the new troops and let the Prince Władysław to Moscow. Prince Yuri moved to Poland. In 1611, the King of the Polish-Lithuanian Commonwealth, Sigismund III Vasa, granted Prince Trubetsky a specific possession of his ancient ancestral patrimony – the city of Trubetsk with surrounding lands. He never returned to Russia and stayed in the restored Principality of Trubetsk with his family. Prince Yuri went to union with Sigismund III Vasa, the King of Poland, and converted to Roman Catholic under the name of Wigund-Jeronym Trubecki. In Poland his descendants were given enviable positions at the Royal court, and married to other princely families of Poland. In January 1612, part of the Polish army mutinied due to unpaid wages and retreated from Russia towards the Commonwealth. The Second Volunteer Army joined the other anti-Polish Russian forces in Moscow by besieging the remaining Polish garrison in the Kremlin. Well armed and organised, the Second Volunteer Army took Yaroslavl in March 1612 and set up a provisional government of Russia, getting support and provisions from many cities. In August 1612 the 9,000-strong Polish army under hetman Jan Karol Chodkiewicz was on the way to lift the siege. On 1 September, the Battle of Moscow (1612) began when Chodkiewicz's forces reached the city, using cavalry attacks in the open field and exercising tactics that were new to them such as escorting a mobile tabor fortress through the city. After early Polish successes, they were dispersed by Russian-aligned Don Cossack reinforcements, and Chodkiewicz's forces retreated from Moscow. On 3 September, Chodkiewicz launched another attack that managed to reach the walls of the Kremlin, but the narrow streets halted the movement of his troops and after the Russian counter-attack he ordered them to retreat from Moscow. Russian victory in the Battle of Moscow secured the city but the Polish garrison in the Kremlin remained until capitulating on 7 November after running out of supplies, and news of the capitulation reached Sigismund on 8 December 1612 at Volokolamsk, less than 30 kilometre away. Upon finding out about this, Sigismund, who was on his way to help the garrison, decided to halt the march and head back to Poland.

In May 1614, Marina Mniszech, Tsarevich Ivan Dmitriyevich, and Cossack leader Ivan Zarutsky, after failing to gather support for the Cossack uprising, they were captured by the Cossacks near the Yaik River and handed over to the government. Marina was imprisoned in the Kolomna Kremlin tower and Ivan and Zarutsky were brought to Moscow. Zarutsky was impaled. Three-year-old Ivan was publicly hanged on 16 July [O.S. 6 July] 1614 in Moscow, near the Serpukhov Gate. According to one account, he was too light for the drop to break his neck and died slowly of strangulation. Five months after the deaths of her son and husband, Marina died in prison on Christmas Eve, 24 December 1614. Prince Trubecki was a member of the court of Vladislav Zhigimontovich (Władysław IV Vasa), the Tsar of Russia. From 1617 to 1618, Prince Trubecki accompanied Vladislav Zhigimontovich during the Siege of Moscow (1618). In 1621, Sigismund III, the King of the Commonwealth, recognized the independence of The Principality of Trubetsk, and guaranteed Prince Wigund his country, and the private possession in his old patrimony, including the city of Trubetsk. In 1634, after death of Prince Trubecki, The Principality of Trubetsk was divided among his sons Piotr and Aleksander Trubecki.

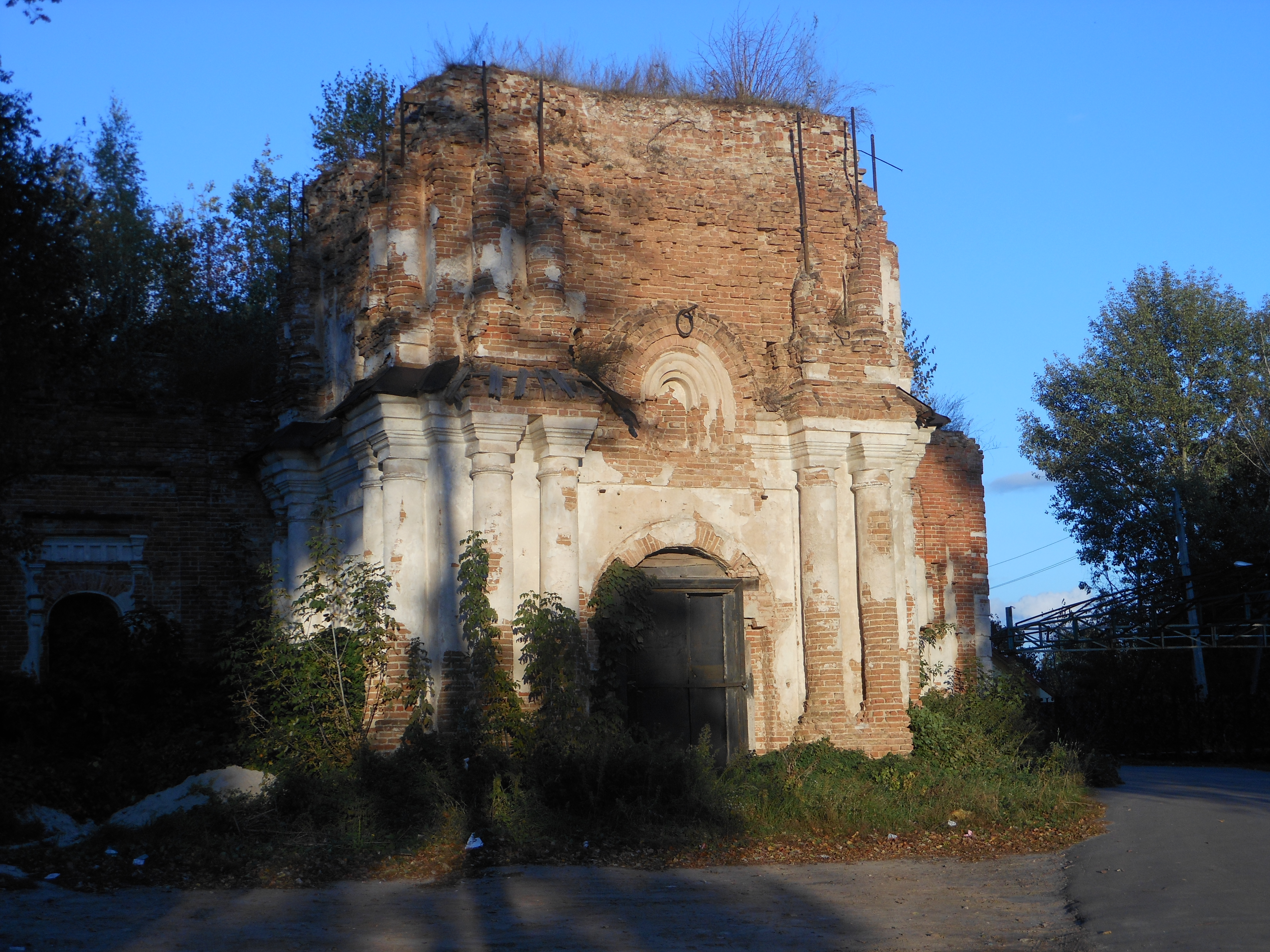
The Church of the Transfiguration in Trubetsk.

== Family ==
Prince Wigund-Jeronym Trubecki was married to N Michałovna Sołtykowa, the daughter of the governor and boyar Mikhail Glebovich Saltykov. From the marriage he had two sons: Piotr Trubecki (d. 1644), the Prince of Trubetsk from 1634 to 1644; earlier podkomorzy and marshal of Starodub, chamberlain of the Royal court of Wladislaus IV of Poland. Piotr was married to Princess Elżbieta Drucka-Sokolińska, who died in 1663. From the marriage Piotr had a son, Jerzy Trubecki (d. 1679).

And Aleksander Trubecki, the Prince of Trubetsk from 1634 to 1657.

== Offspring ==
With the death of Aleksy Nikiticz Trubecki in 1680, the family of Princes Trubecki ceased to exist in Russia, and the name Trubecki remained only in Lithuania and Poland thanks to Prince Wigund-Jeronym Trubecki. Wigund-Jeronym had two male children from his wife, née Sołtyk: Prince Piotr (chamberlain of the Polish court and marshal of Starodub, married to Princess Elżbieta Sokolińska), and Prince Aleksander. The latter died maybe without leaving the offspring, and thus the family of the Princes Trubecki continued only through Piotr Trubecki, from whom all the Trubeckis, that exist today, originated.

== See also ==
- List of szlachta
- Palemonowicze
- Szlachta
- Trubecki

== Literature ==
- Boguslavsky V.V. Slavic encyclopedia. Kievan Rus - Muscovy: in 2 volumes. Olma-Press, 2005.
- Dunning, Chester S.L. Russia's First Civil War: The Time of Troubles and the Founding of the Romanov Dynasty, Penn State Press, 2001 ISBN 0-271-02074-1
- Morozova L.E. Russia on the way from the Troubles. Science (publishing), 2005. – ISBN 5-02-033508-8
- Morozova L. E. History of Russia. Time of Troubles. AST, 2011. - ISBN 978-5-17-075574-5
- Shubin, Daniel H. Tsars, Pseudo-Tsars and the Era of Russia's Upheavals, ISBN 978-1365414176

Regnal titles
Preceded by Aleksander Symeon-Bogdanowicz Trubecki	Prince of Trubetsk; 1611–1634	Succeeded by Piotr Trubecki & Aleksander Trubecki
