= Peter Troubetzkoy =

Russian diplomat and general (1822–1892)

Prince Peter Troubetzkoy
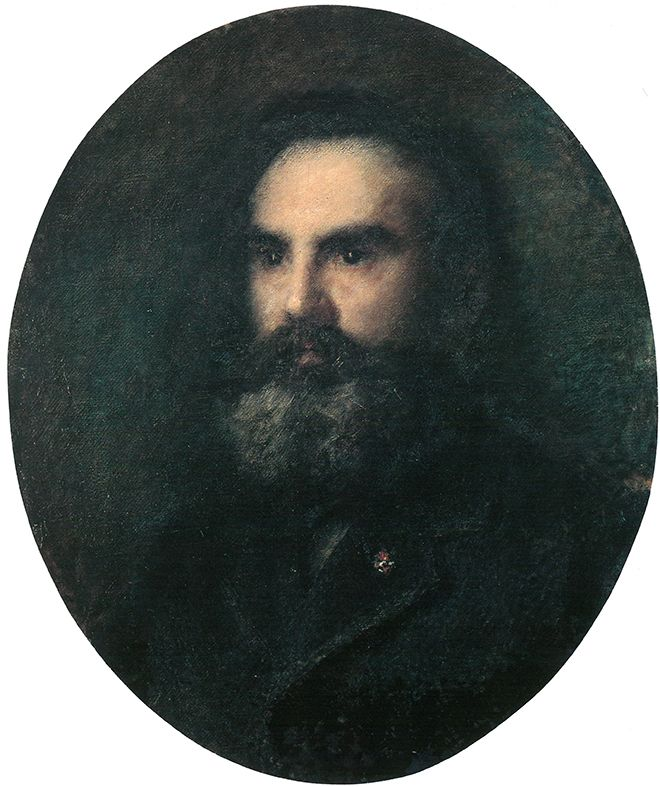
- Born: June 25, 1881; Tulchyn, Russian Empire
- Died: 1892 (aged 69–70); Menton, France
- Occupations: Diplomat; administrator; general
- Children: seven, including Paolo Troubetzkoy

Prince Pyotr Petrovich Troubetzkoy (1822 – 1892) was a Russian diplomat, administrator, and general.

== Biography ==
Trubetzkoy was in 1822, the son of Pyotr Ivanovich Trubetskoy and Emilia Petrovna Trubetskoy.

His first wife was his cousin, Princess Varvara Yourievna Trubetskoy.

In 1844 he was appointed governor of Smolensk, and Orel.

In 1865 he went to Florence, Italy on a diplomatic mission which included the supervision of the Russian church there. In Florence he met Ada Winans, an American lyric singer, and with her moved to Ghiffa on Lake Maggiore.

Troubetzkoy divorced Varvara in 1870 and married Ada. He could then recognize his three sons born from Ada : Pierre (husband of American novelist Amélie Louise Rives), famous sculptor Paolo and Luigi.

Keen on botany, Piotr found in Ghiffa the best place to develop an important botanic garden and build his residential villa.

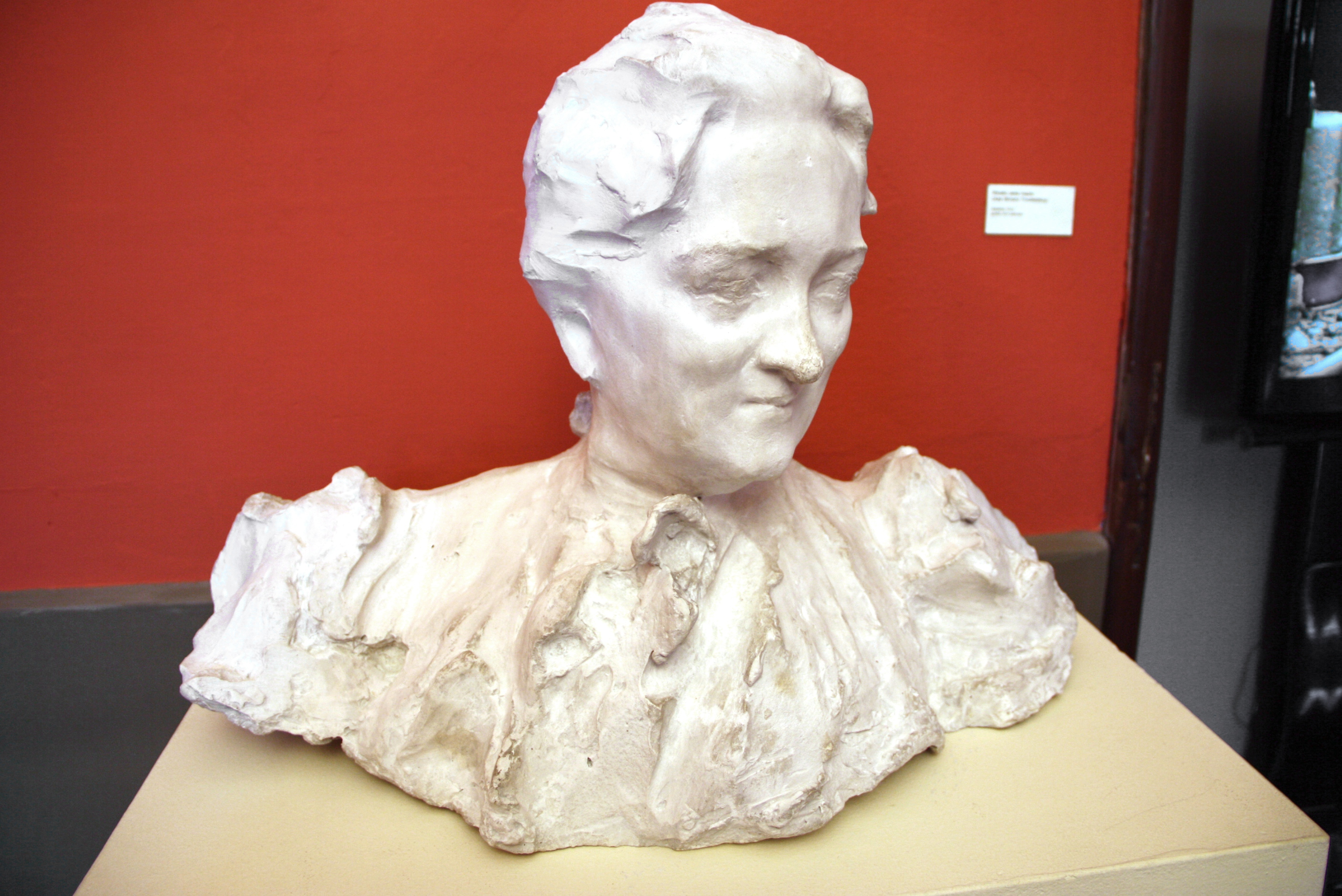
Paolo Troubetzkoy. Portrait of mother (Ada Winans)

In 1884, owing to the financial disaster of the Panama Canal construction he was forced to sell the villa in Ghiffa and, separated from Ada, he retired with Marianna Hahn first in Milan where was born their natural son Pietro Troubetzkoy Hahn 1886, and finally to Menton (France) where he died in 1892.

== See also ==
- Trubetskoy family
