= Ivan Trubetskoy =

Russian field marshal

- Иван Трубецкой
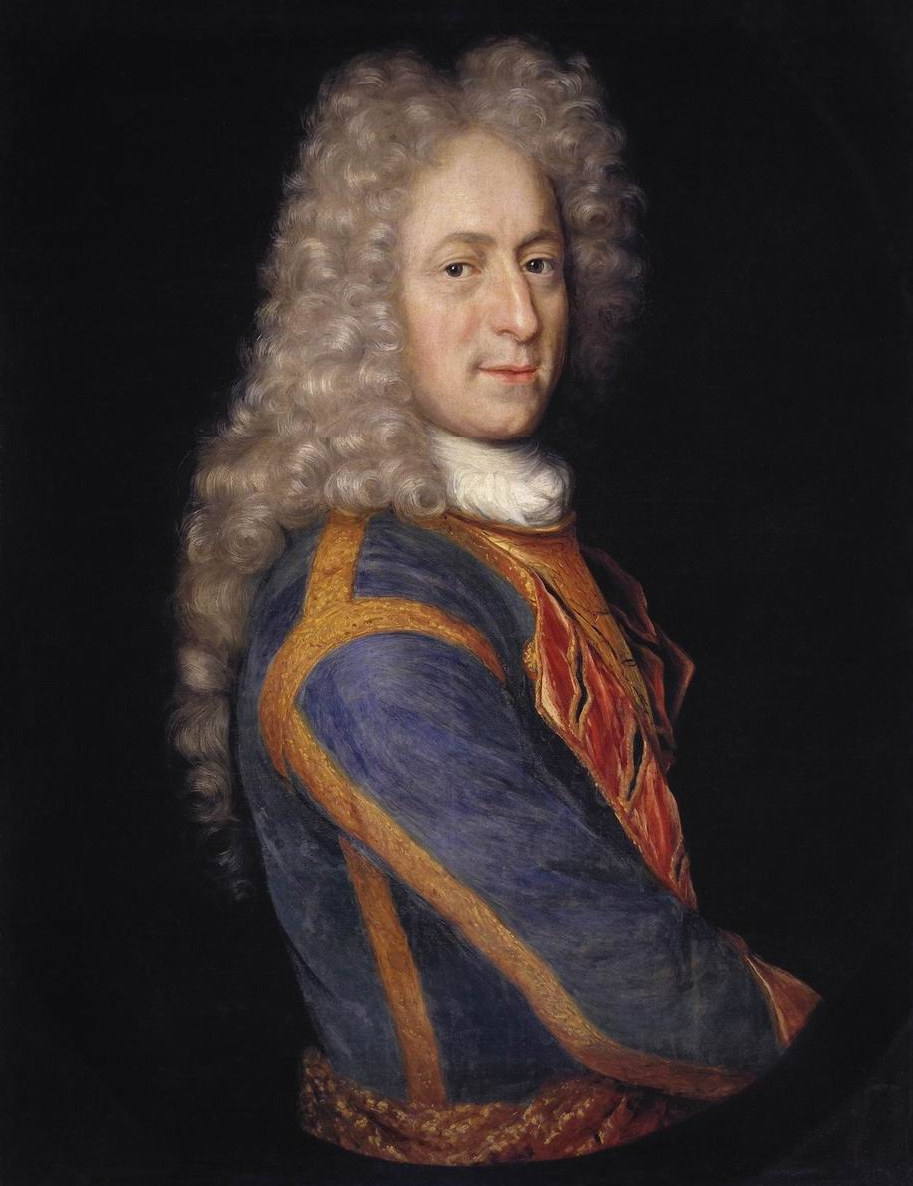

Governor of Moscow
- In office 23 May 1739 – 23 April 1739
- Preceded by: Ivan Baryatinsky
- Succeeded by: Karl Biron

Personal details
- Born: 28 July 1667 Moscow, Russia
- Died: 27 January 1750 (aged 82) Saint Petersburg, Russia
- Resting place: Alexander Nevsky Lavra
- Parent: Yuriy Trubetskoy
- Awards: Order of St. Andrew; Order of Saint Alexander Nevsky

Military service
- Allegiance: Russia
- Years of service: 1680–1700
- Rank: Field Marshal

Prince Ivan Yurievich Trubetskoy (Russian: Иван Юрьевич Трубецкой; 28 June 1667 – 27 January 1750) was a Russian field marshal, promoted in 1728. The son of Yuriy Trubetskoy, as a member of the House of Trubetskoy, he was a member of the inner circle of Tsar Peter I of Russia of the House of Romanov. Made a boyar in 1692, Trubetskoy commanded part of the Russian fleet during the Azov campaigns in 1696. In 1699, he was named governor of Novgorod. Trubetskoy ordered surrender during the Battle of Narva in 1700. He was captured and held prisoner in Sweden until exchanged in 1718. At the moment of death he was the last living boyar in Russia. Elisabeth made him a member of the renewed Senate.
