= Yuriy Trubetskoy =

Ruthenian prince during the 17th century

- Юрий Трубецкой
- Born: c. 1643; Starodub, Polish–Lithuanian Commonwealth
- Died: 12 July 1679 (aged 36)
- Burial place: Trinity Lavra of St. Sergius
- Spouse: Iryną Golicyną
- Children: 2
- Relatives: Yuri Nikita Trubecki (grandfather); Aleksey Trubetskoy (great-uncle); Ivan Trubetskoy (son); Nikita Trubetskoy (grandson)
- Family: Trubetsky family

Prince Yuriy Petrovich Trubetskoy (Russian: Юрий Петрович Трубецкой; c. 1643 – 12 July 1679) was a Ruthenian boyar from the Trubetsky family.

== Biography ==
During the 16th century, the Trubetsky family split between brothers Alexei, who elected to stay under Russian tsarship, and Yuri Nikita, Yuriy's grandfather, who favored the Kingdom of Poland. Yuriy was born circa 1643 in Starodub, Poland to Piotr Trubecki and Elżbieta Iwanowna Trubecka née Drucka-Sokolińska. Trubetskoy was serving as a boyar in 1656 when his great-uncle Alexei began trying to convince him to come to Moscow but he refused. His maternal grandparents issued him ownership of Czarnorucz, Podrecz, and Sokolnia, all of which were in the Kingdom of Poland. In 1657, Alexei began making threats against Poland; Trubetskoy quickly conceded.

He named his step-father Krzysztof Wołodkiewicz his heir to the boyarship in Poland, made it clear in his writings that he was being forced to go to Russia and would later return to his homeland, and left. Alexei had no children so Trubetskoy became boyar under Peter the Great as Alexei's heir. In 1660, Trubetskoy was made a boyar by Tsar Alexei of Russia and a voivode of Kyiv, then in the Tsardom of Russia, in 1673.

He died in 1679.

== Personal life ==
Trubetskoy married Iryną Golicyną, daughter of Vasily Vasilyevich Golitsyn, after accepting the village of Bogorodskoye-Kraskovo as dowry. They had two sons, Ivan and Yuri. Nikita Trubetskoy was his grandson via Ivan.
