= Paolo Troubetzkoy =

Russian sculptor (1866–1938)

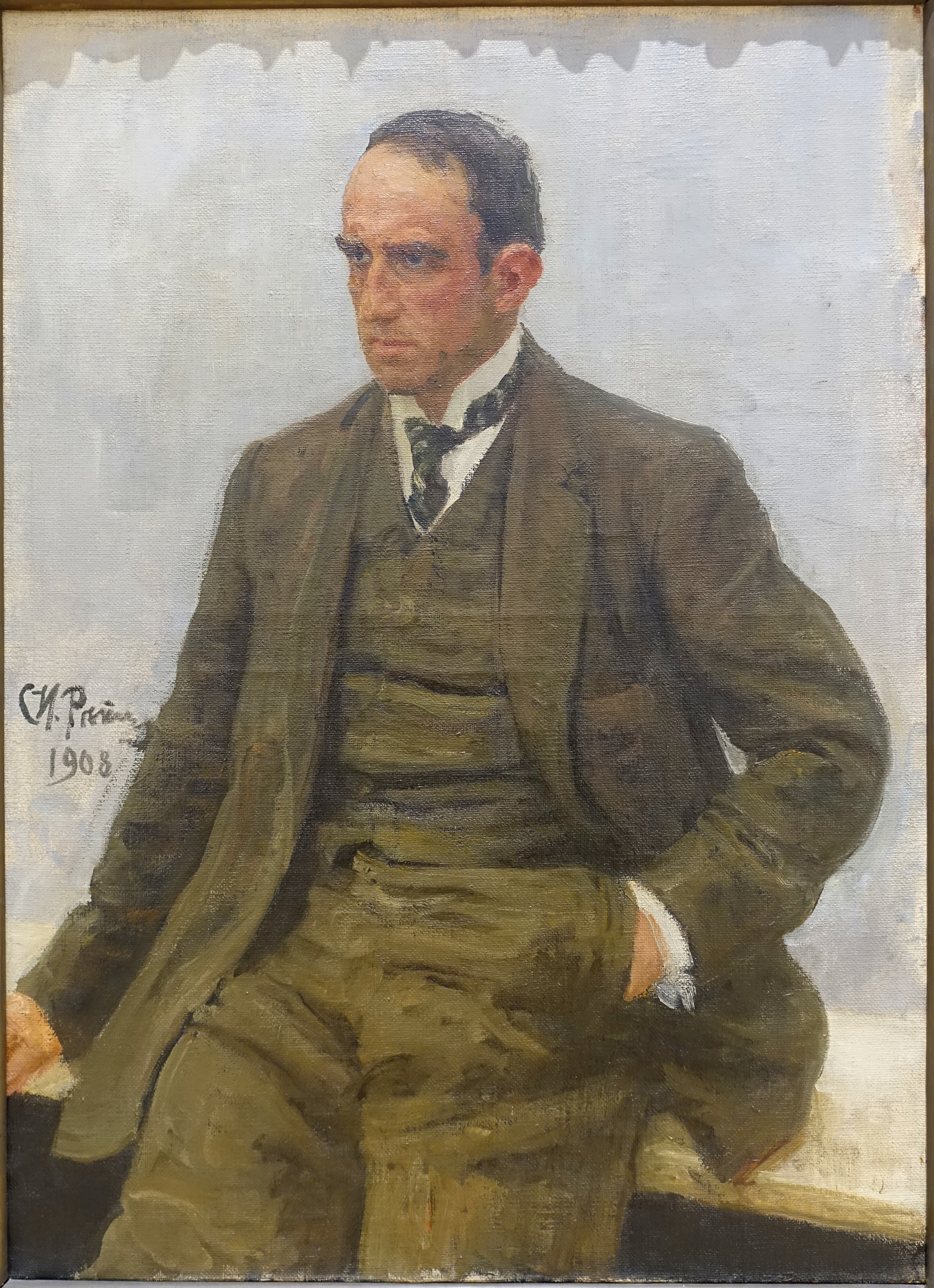
- Portrait by Ilya Repin, 1908, oils; La Galleria Nazionale, Rome.
- Born: Paolo Stahl; February 15, 1866; Intra, Verbania
- Died: February 12, 1938 (aged 71); Pallanza, Verbania
- Known for: Sculpture
- Movement: Impressionism

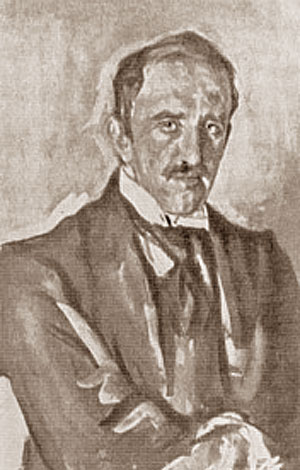
Portrait of Paolo Troubetzkoy by Valentin Serov

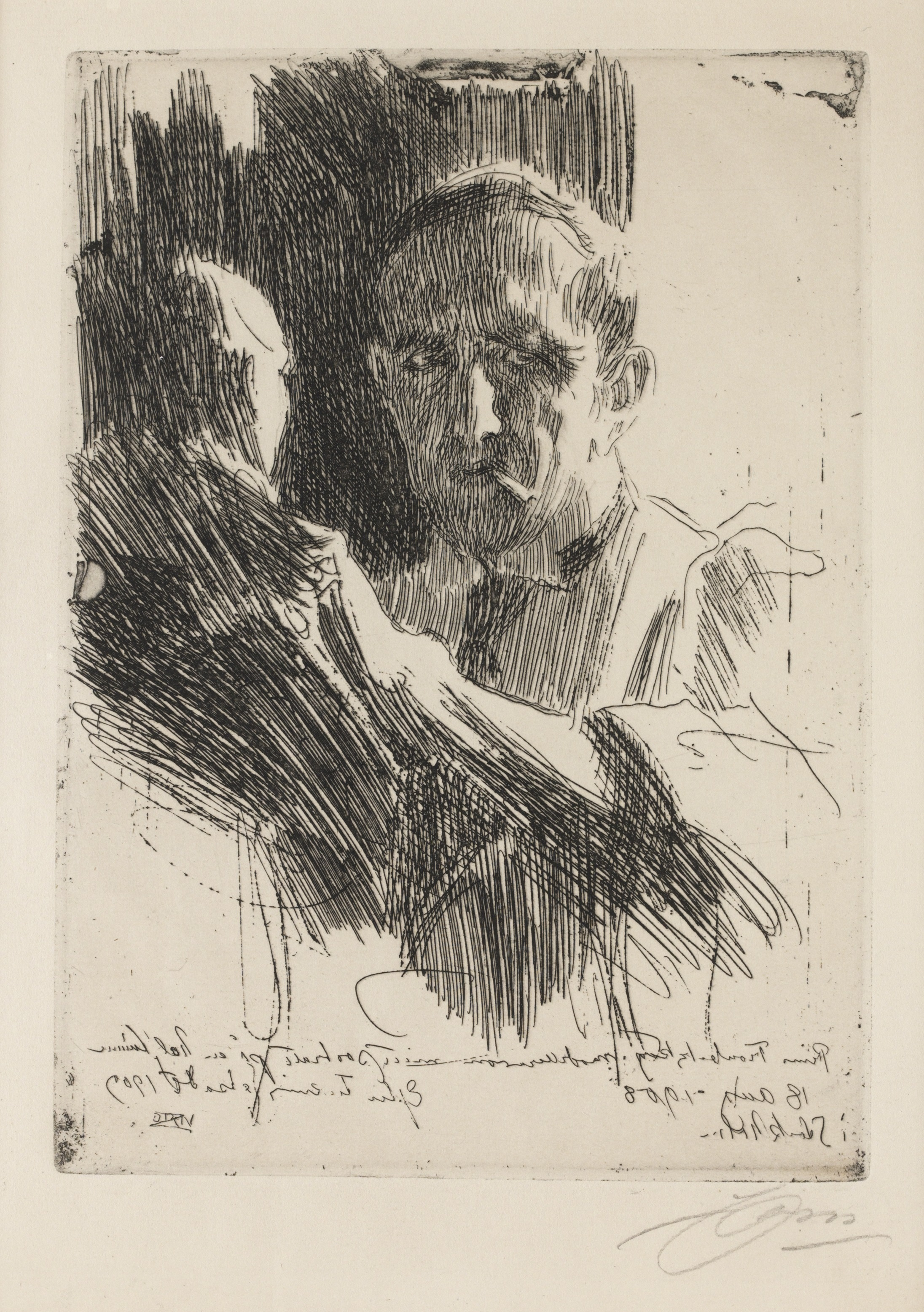
Portrait of Troubetzkoy, etching, by Anders Zorn, 1909

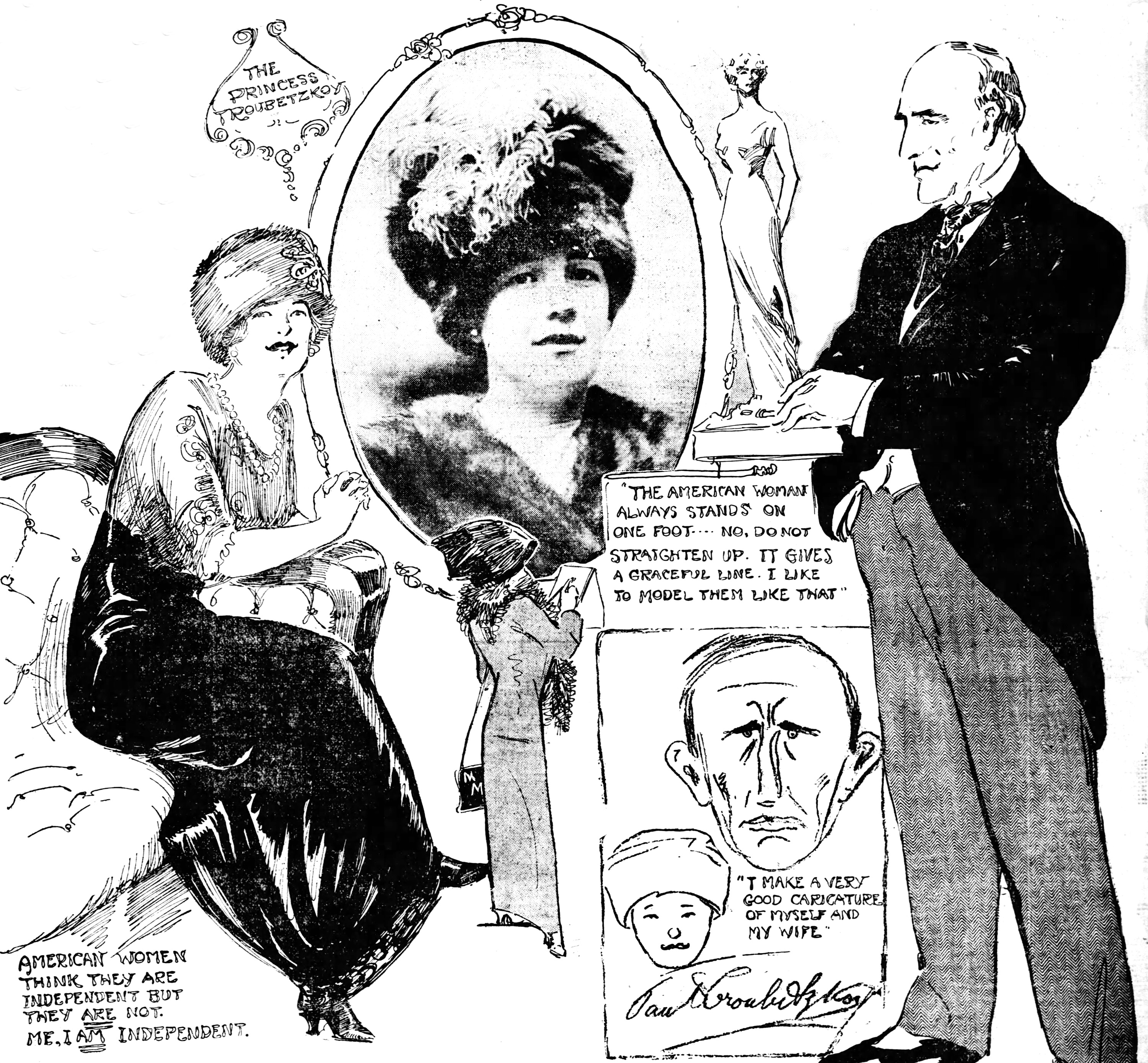
Portion of St. Louis Post-Dispatch page of March 17, 1912, shows reporter Marguerite Martyn, in the center, making sketches for her article on Troubetzkoy and his wife, Elin Sundström (drawing right and photo center). The layout also includes a caricature that Troubetzkoy did of Sundström and himself, as well as Troubetzkoy quotations that Martyn noted.

Prince Paolo Petrovich Troubetzkoy (also known as Pavel or Paul; Russian: Павел Петрович Трубецкой, romanized: Pavel Petrovich Trubetskoy; 15 February 1866 — 12 February 1938) was an Italian sculptor of Russian origin who was described by George Bernard Shaw as "the most astonishing sculptor of modern times". By birth, he was a member of the Trubetskoy family.

== Life ==
He was the son of Russian diplomat, Prince Peter Petrovich Troubetzkoy (1822–1892) and his second wife, lyric singer Ada Winans (1831–1917). His paternal grandmother was Princess Emilie zu Sayn-Wittgenstein-Sayn (1801–1869), which makes him great-grandson of famous Marshal Prince Peter zu Sayn-Wittgenstein-Berleburg-Ludwigsburg. He worked in Italy, Russia, the United States, England and France.

Troubetzkoy grew up in a family open to the influence of the Milanese Scapigliatura. Among the visitors to the family villa was the Scapigliato painter Daniele Ranzoni, whose portraits included Gigi, Piero and Paolo Troubetzkoy. He was a self-taught artist, although he learned painture from Daniele Ranzoni during his childhood and sculpture from Giuseppe Grandi. He is associated with impressionism, due to his ability to grasp sketchy movements in his bronze works. He was heavily influenced by the work of Auguste Rodin and Medardo Rosso. He depicted the society of the Belle Époque. Few of his bronzes are still available in the market. Quite famous is the 35 cm high portrait of Constance Stewart-Richardson called The Dancer. His work was also part of the sculpture event in the art competition at the 1912 Summer Olympics.

The largest and best known of his works is the monumental equestrian statue of the Russian Tsar Alexander III in St. Petersburg, Russia. The monument was opened in 1909 on the Nevsky Prospekt near the Moskovsky Vokzal terminal. After the Russian revolution of 1917, the Soviet government removed the monument from the main street to the rear of the Russian Museum in St. Petersburg. After the dissolution of the Soviet Union, in 1994, the monument to Alexander was placed in front of the Marble Palace near the embankment of the Neva river, at the former site of the armoured car that transported Lenin from Finland Station.

After his death, all the plaster works preserved in his ateliers in Neuilly-sur-Seine and Verbania Pallanza were donated by his heirs to Museo del Paesaggio in Verbania Pallanza. Currently the Museum preserves more than 300 of Troubetzkoy's sculptures.

== Vegetarianism ==
Troubetzkoy was a vegetarian. His vegetarian friend George Bernard Shaw remarked: “Troubetzkoy is a gigantic and terrifying humanitarian who can do anything with an animal except eat it”.

Alexandra Tolstoy, daughter of the great novelist Leo Tolstoy wrote in her father's biography: "From time to time he posed – a tiring obligation – for painters and sculptors: for Repin, Pasternak who did a study of the family, Aronson, and Paolo Troubetzkoy. Troubetzkoy, a Russian educated in Italy, did some splendid little statues of Tolstoy – one of him on horseback. Father was very fond of him. A sweet and childlike person in addition to his great gifts, he read practically nothing, spoke little, all his life was wrapped up in sculpture. As a convinced vegetarian he would not eat meat but cried: "Je ne mange pas de cadavre!" if anyone offered him some. In his studio in St. Petersburg there was a whole zoo: a bear, a fox, a horse, and a vegetarian wolf.

Troubetzkoy once said “As I cannot kill I cannot authorize others to kill. Do you see? If you are buying from a butcher you are authorizing him to kill — kill helpless, dumb creatures, which neither I nor you could kill ourselves.”

== Personal life ==
Troubetzkoy was married twice. His first marriage was to a Swedish woman, Elin Sundström (1883–1927) and his second marriage was to a British woman named Muriel Marie Boddam. His son Pierre died at the age of 2 1/2 years - he sculpted in the same year the sculpture "Maternity".

== Gallery ==
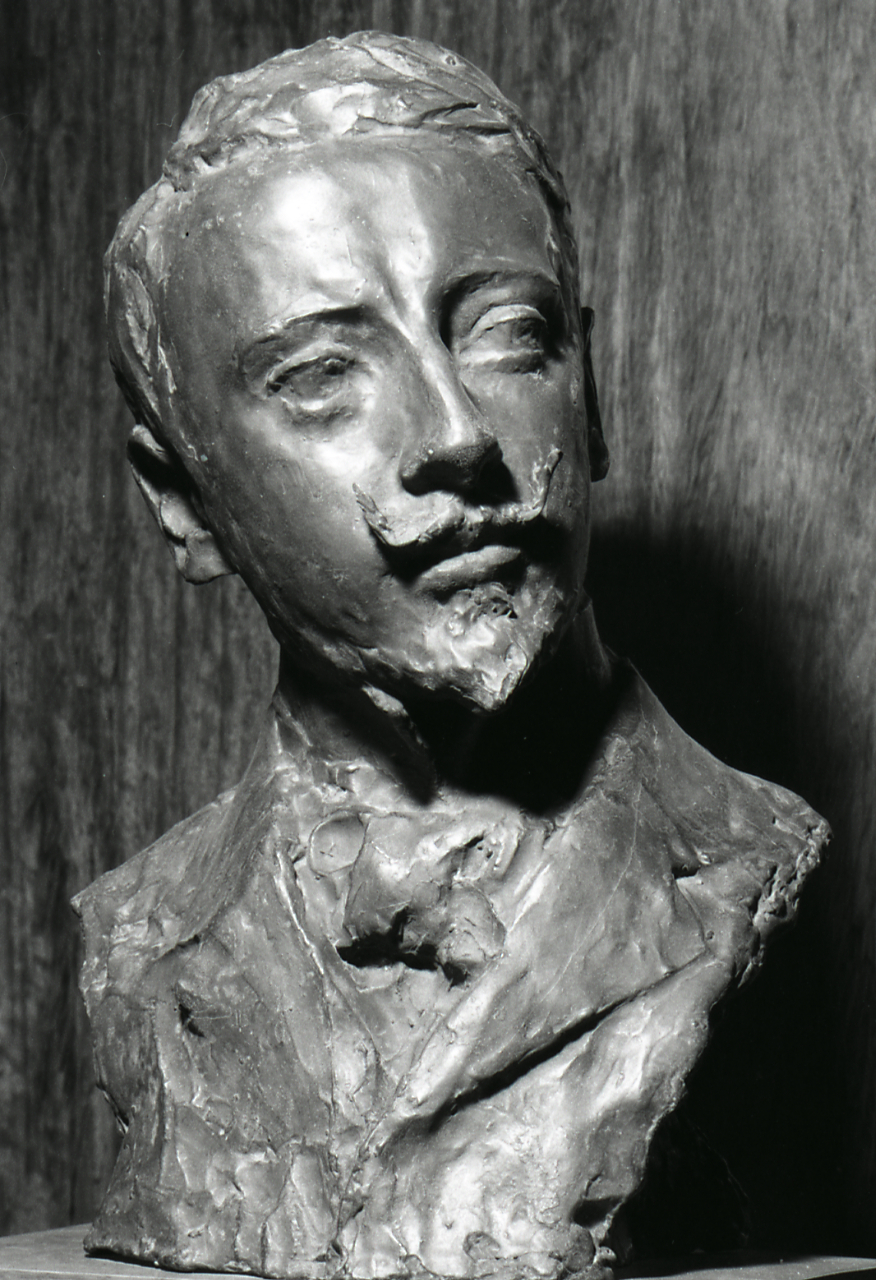
Bust of Gabriele D'Annunzio, 1892. Vittoriale degli Italiani, Gardone Riviera. Photo by Paolo Monti, 1969.

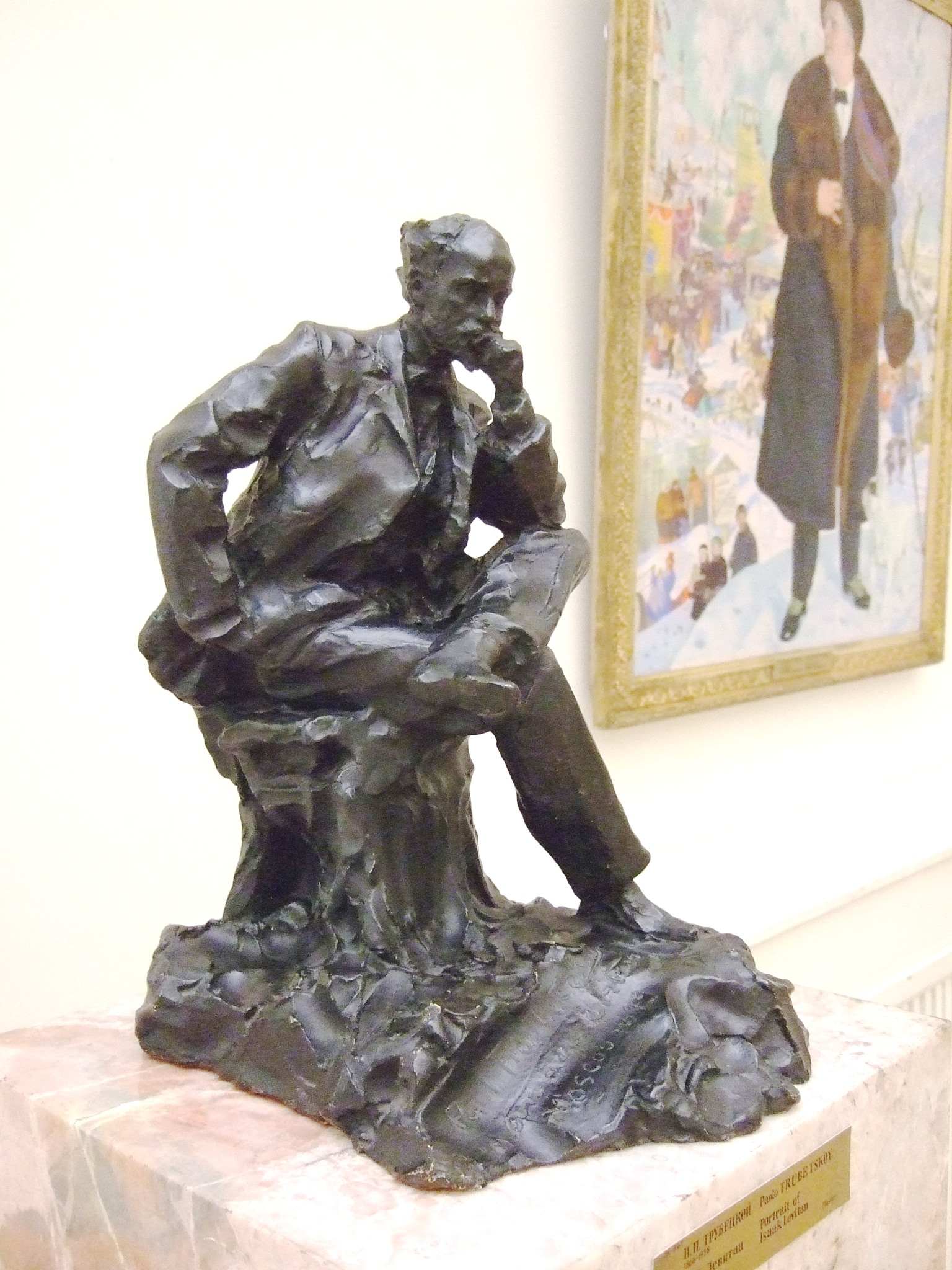
Isaac Levitan, 1899

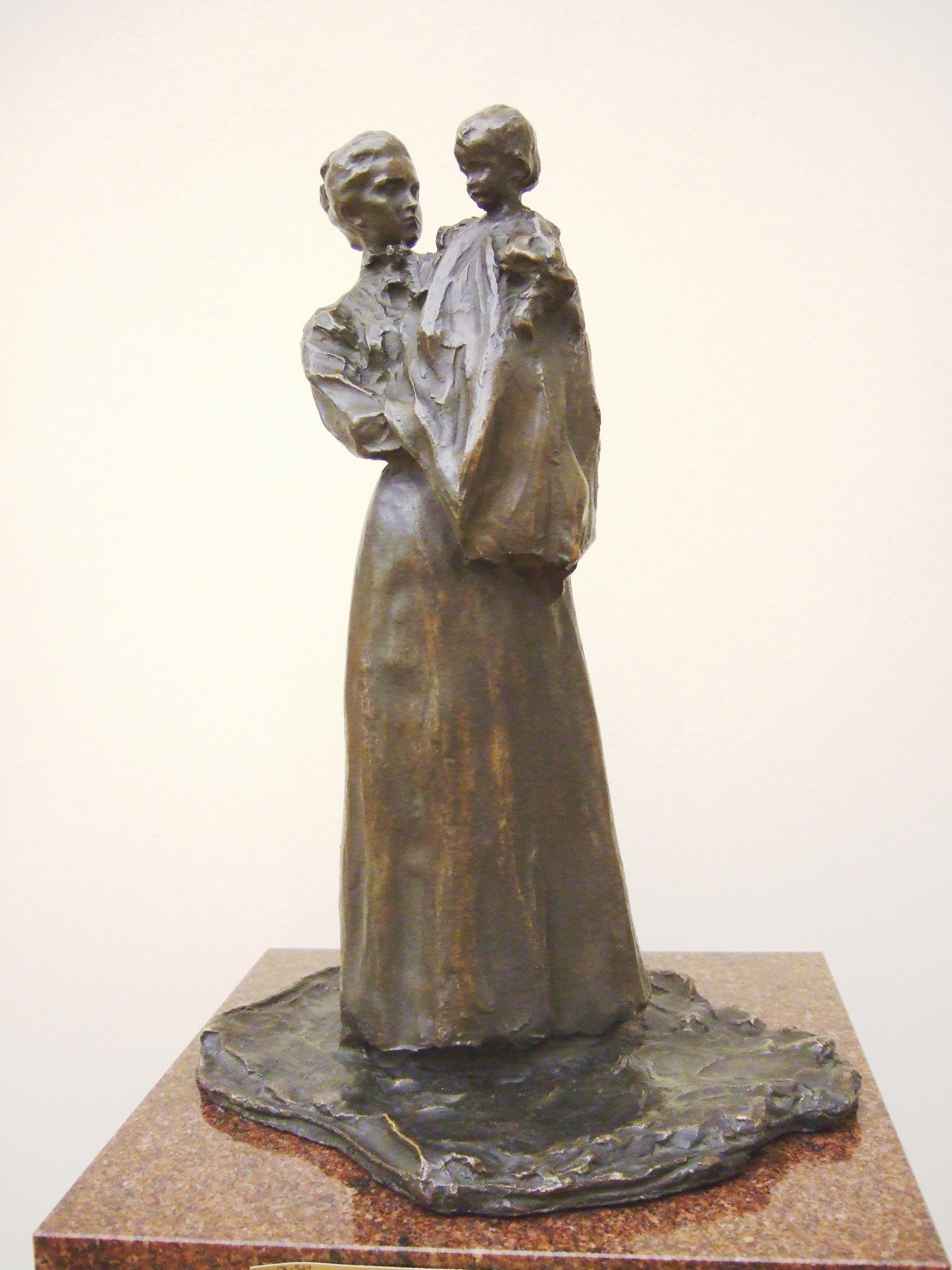
Princess M.N. Gagarina with her daughter, Marina, 1898

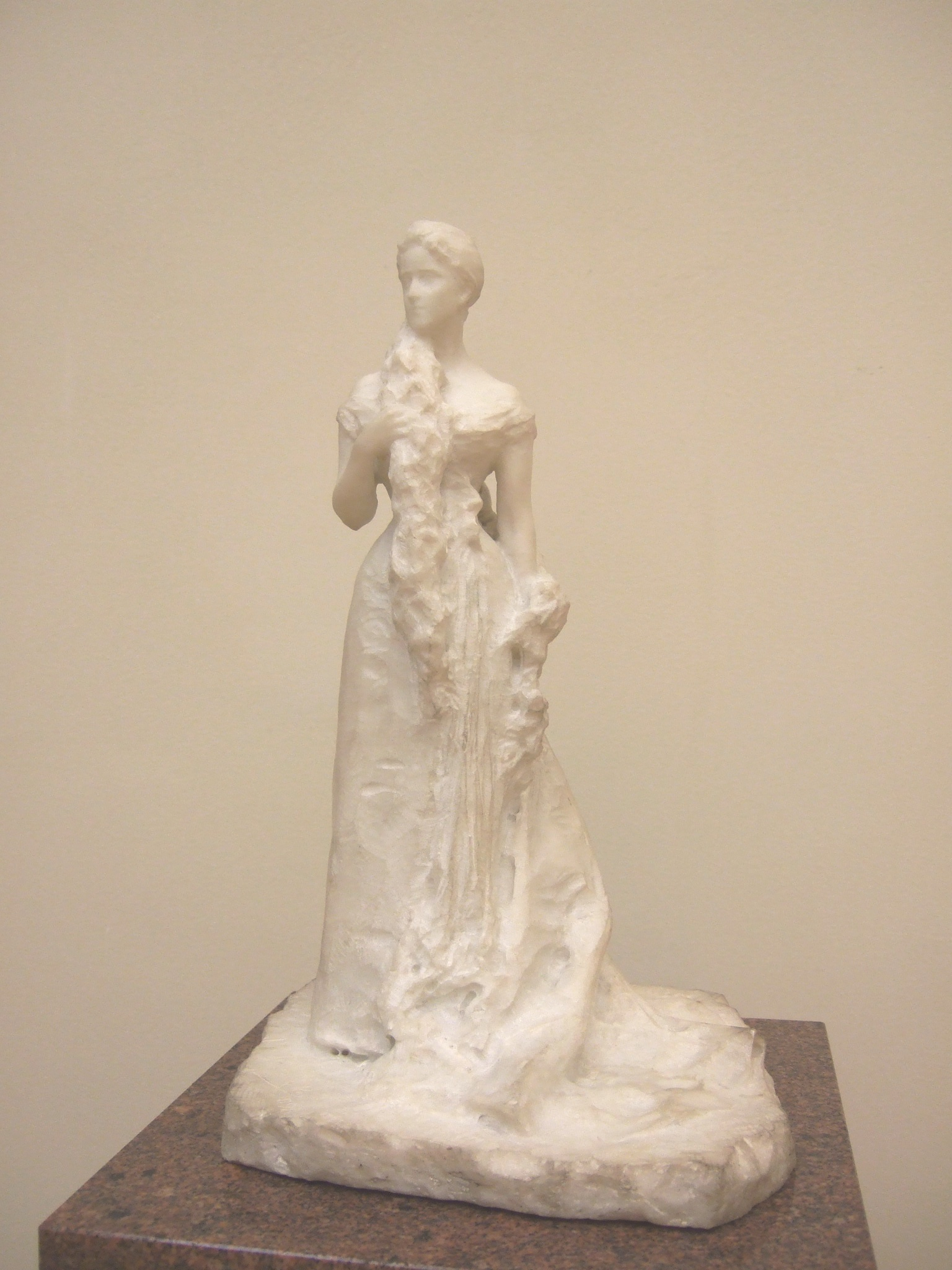
Grand Duchess Elizabeth Feodorovna, 1899

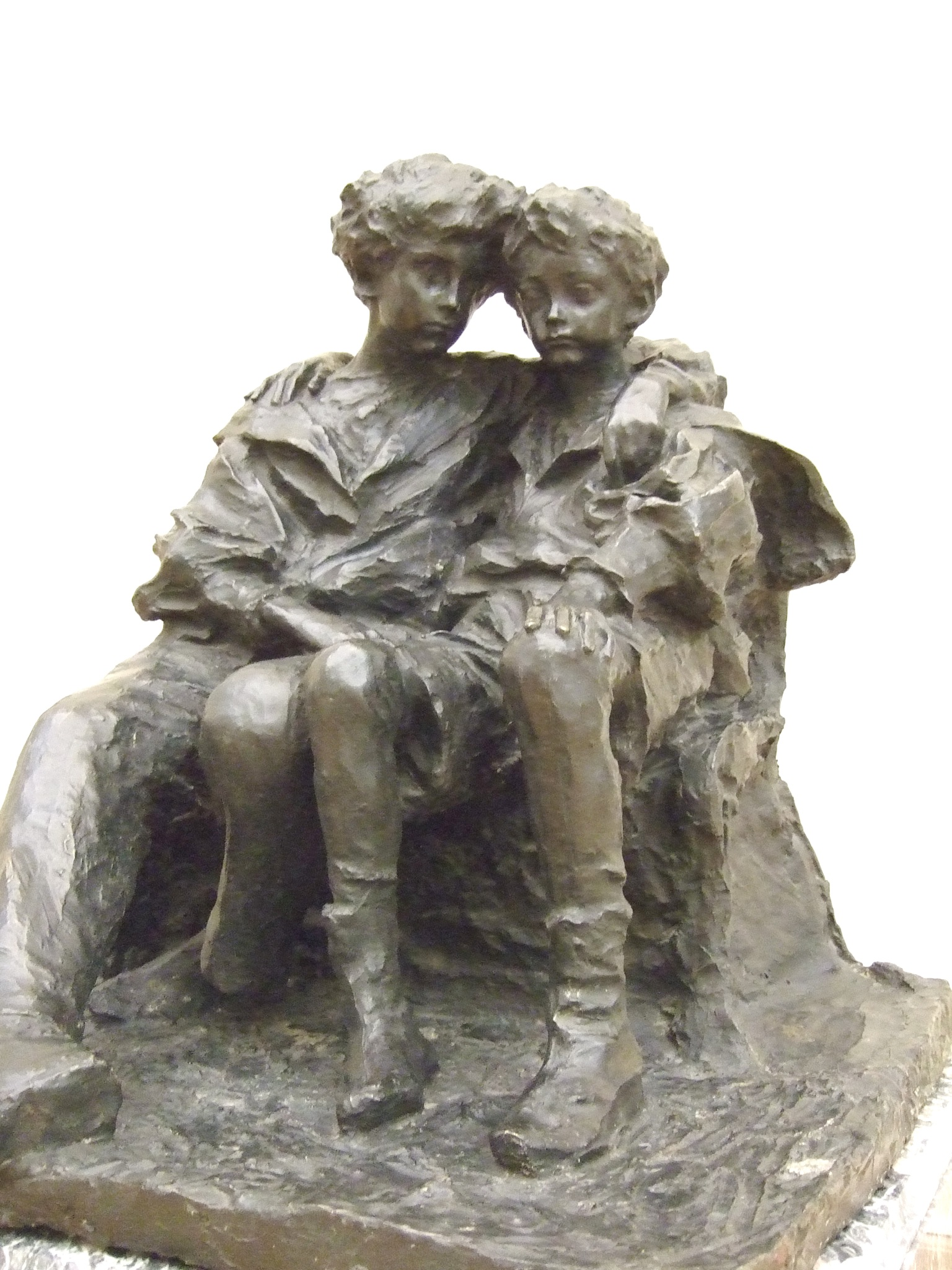
Children (N.S and V.S Troubetzkoy), 1900

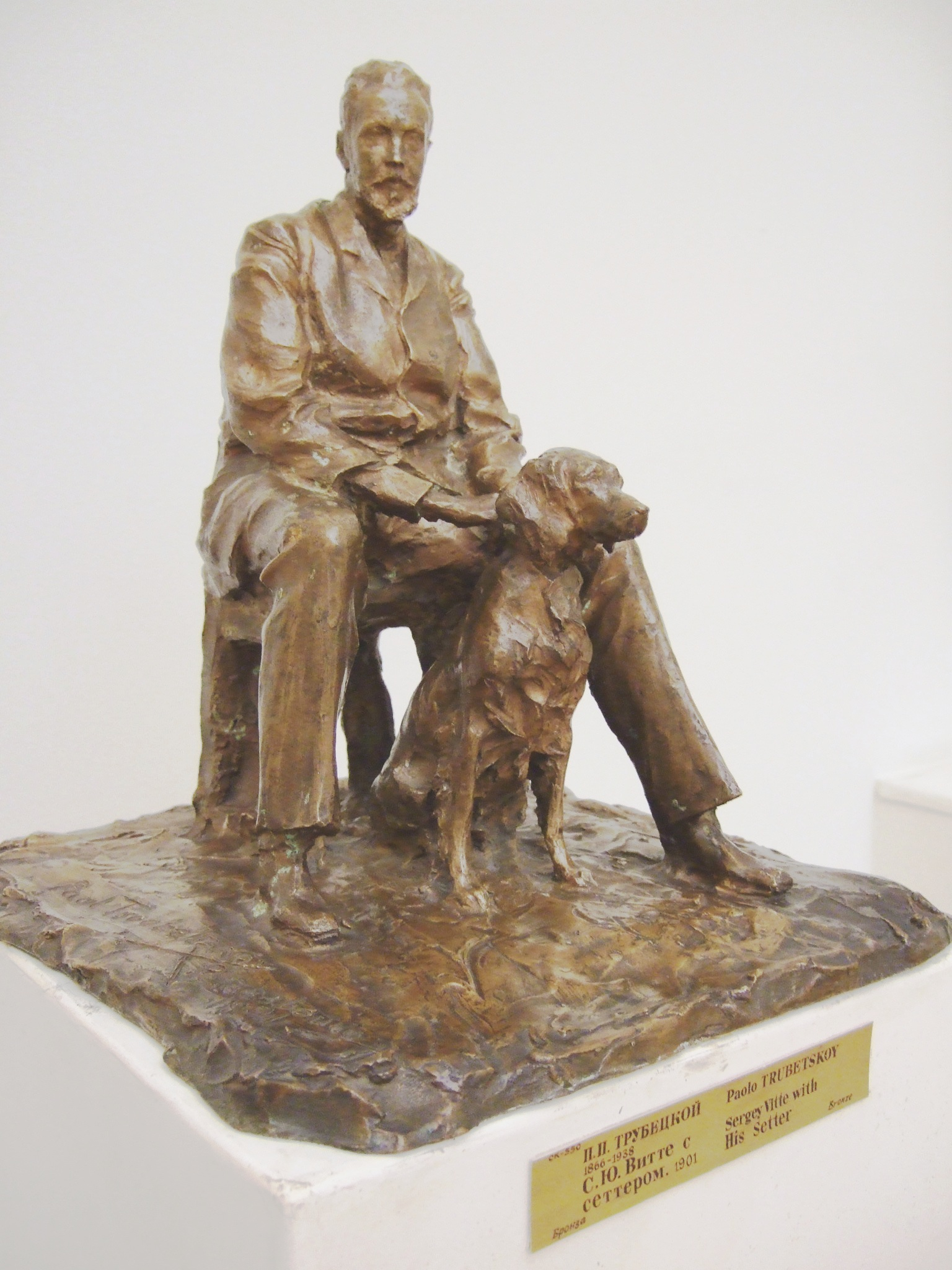
Sergei Witte with his setter, 1901

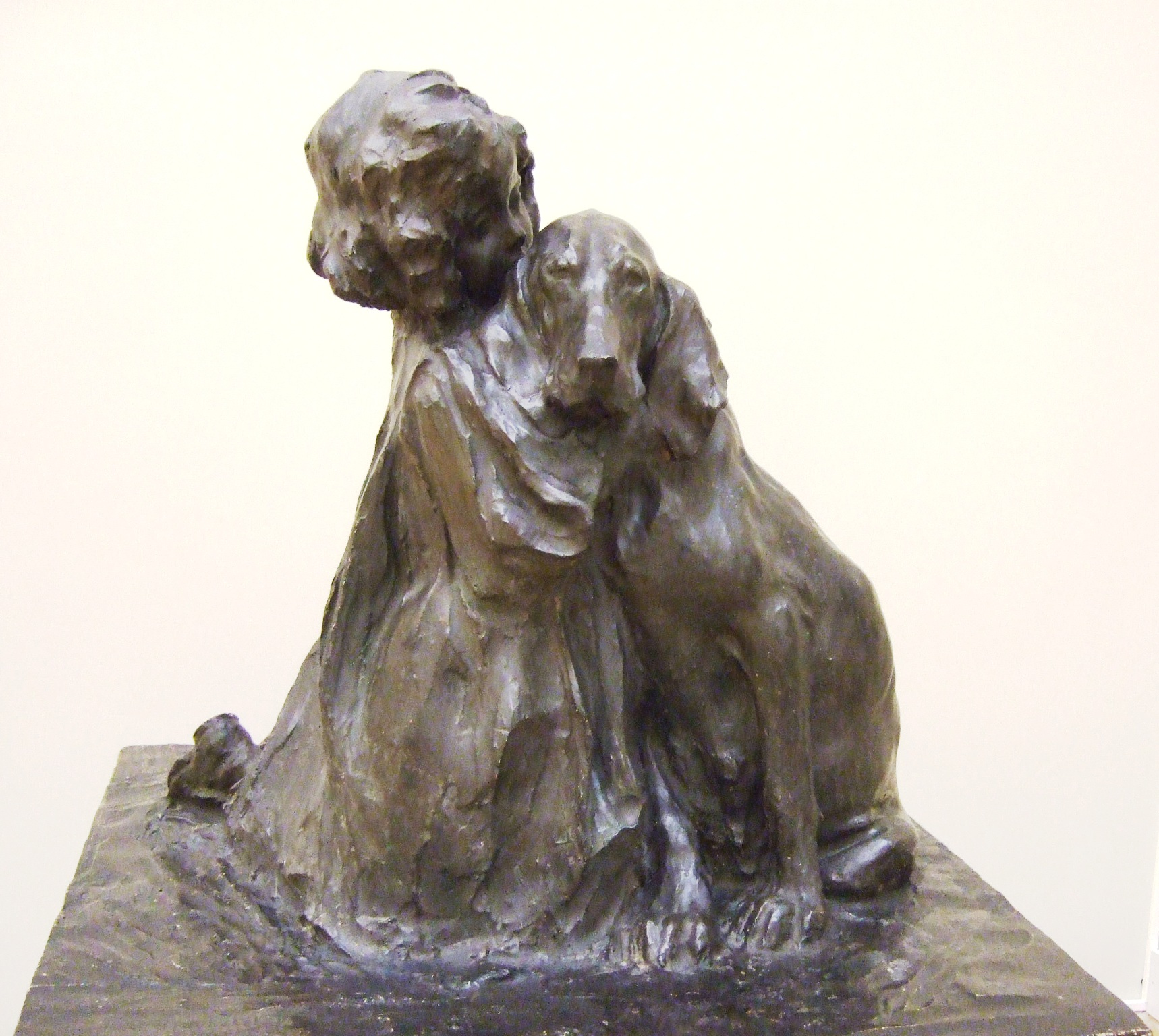
Friends, 1901

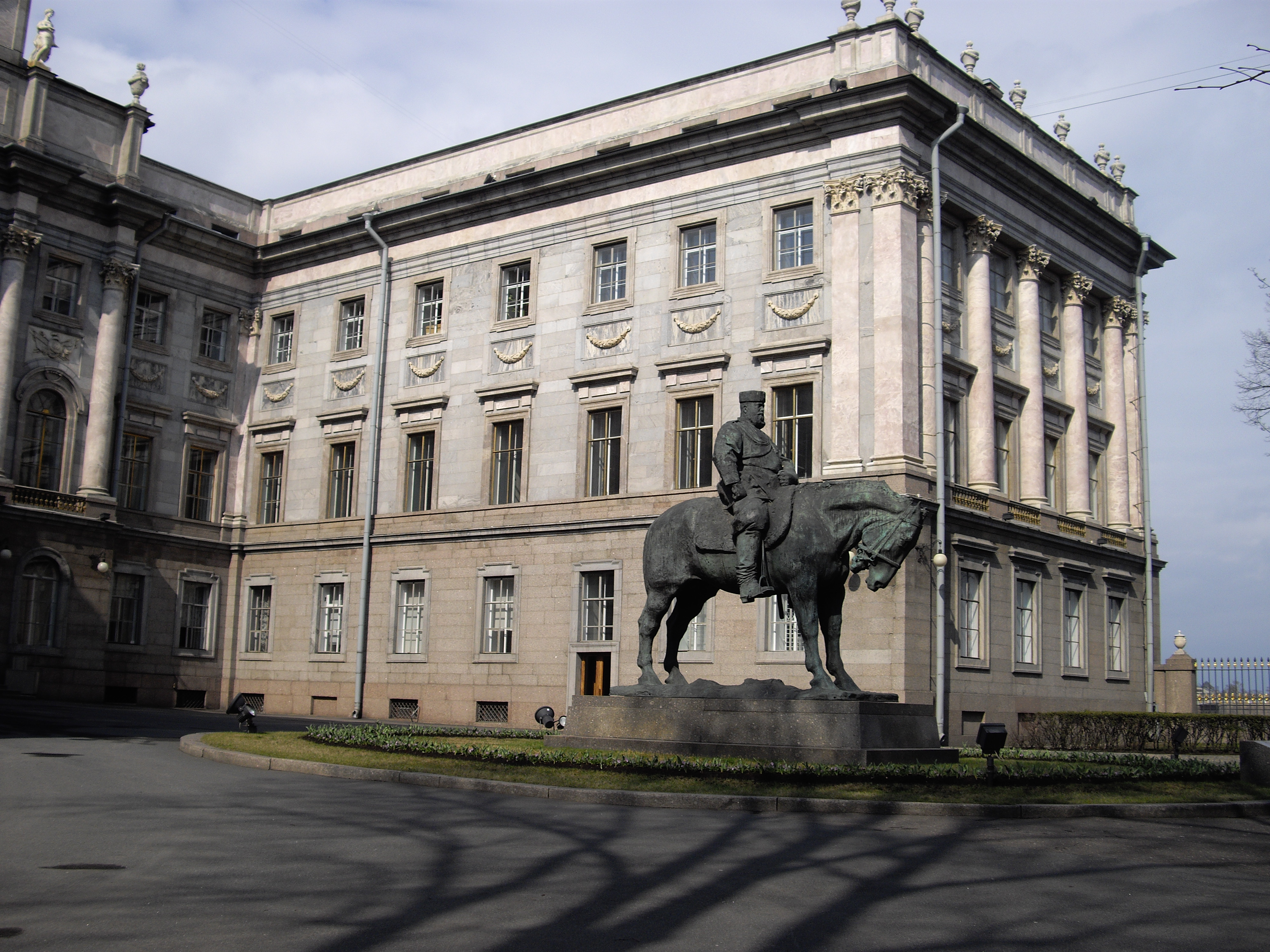
Monument to Alexander III of Russia in front of the Marble Palace

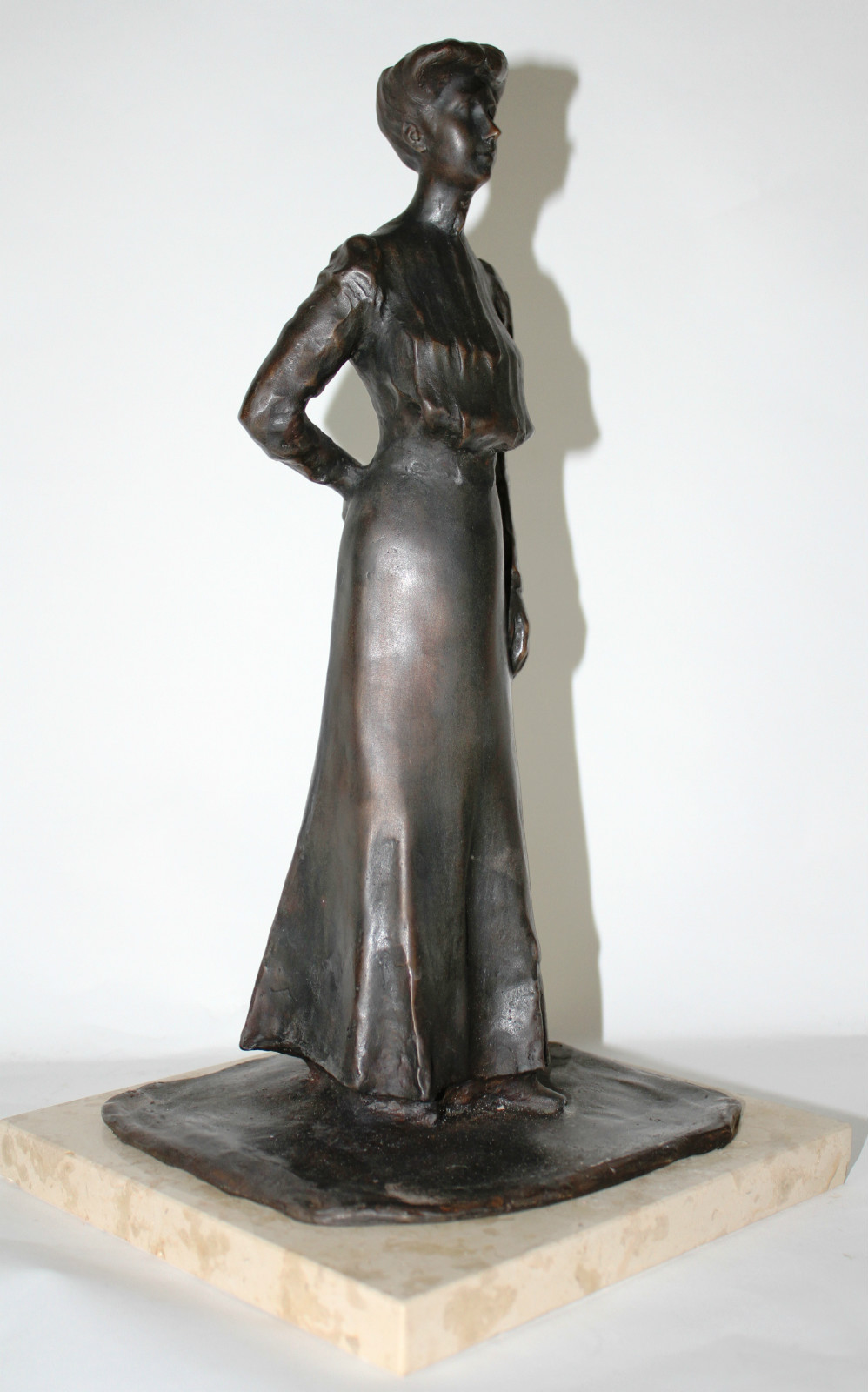
Lady Standing, 1927, Bass-Dwyer Collection

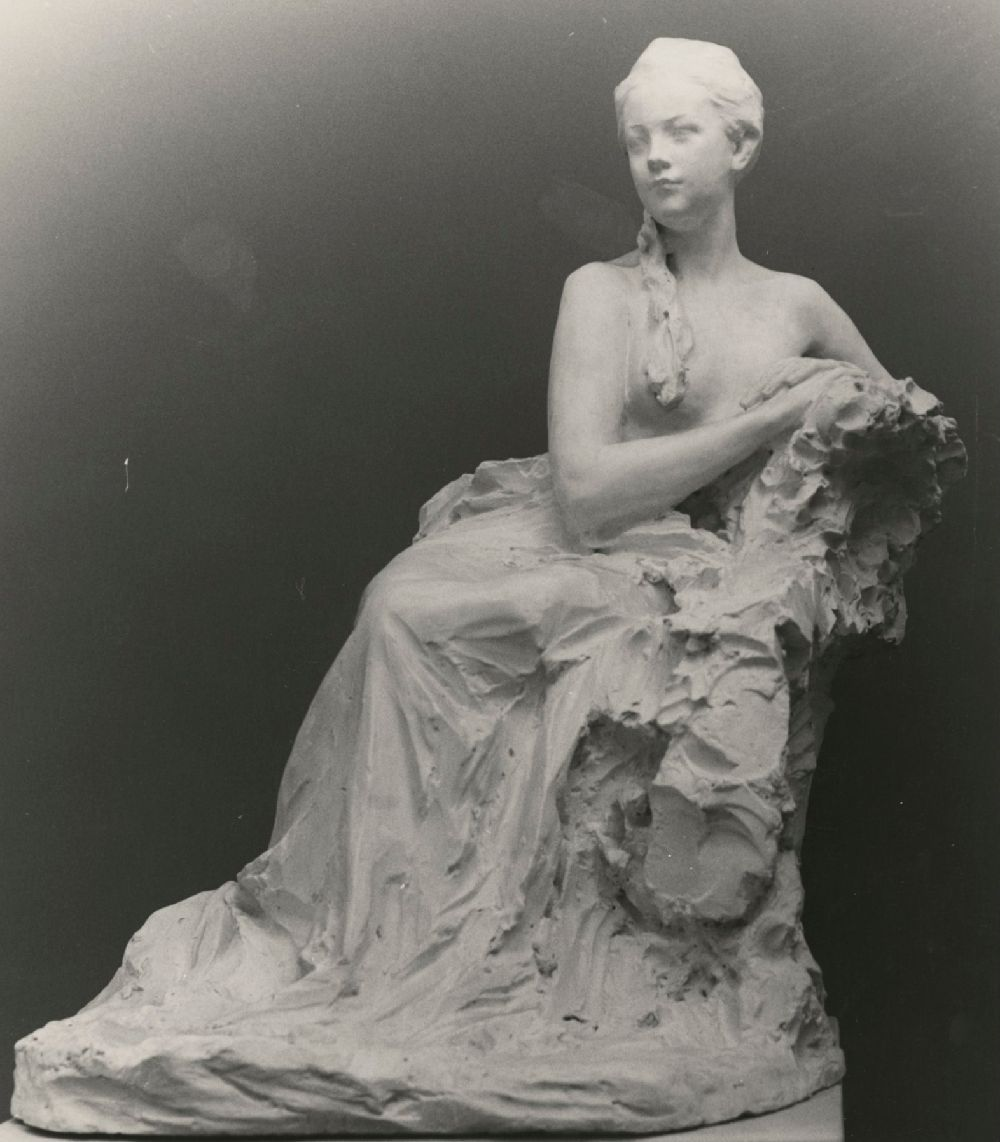
Paolo Troubetzkoy, Portrait of Mrs. Troubetzkoy, photo by David Finn, David Finn Archive, Department of Image Collections, National Gallery of Art Library, Washington, DC

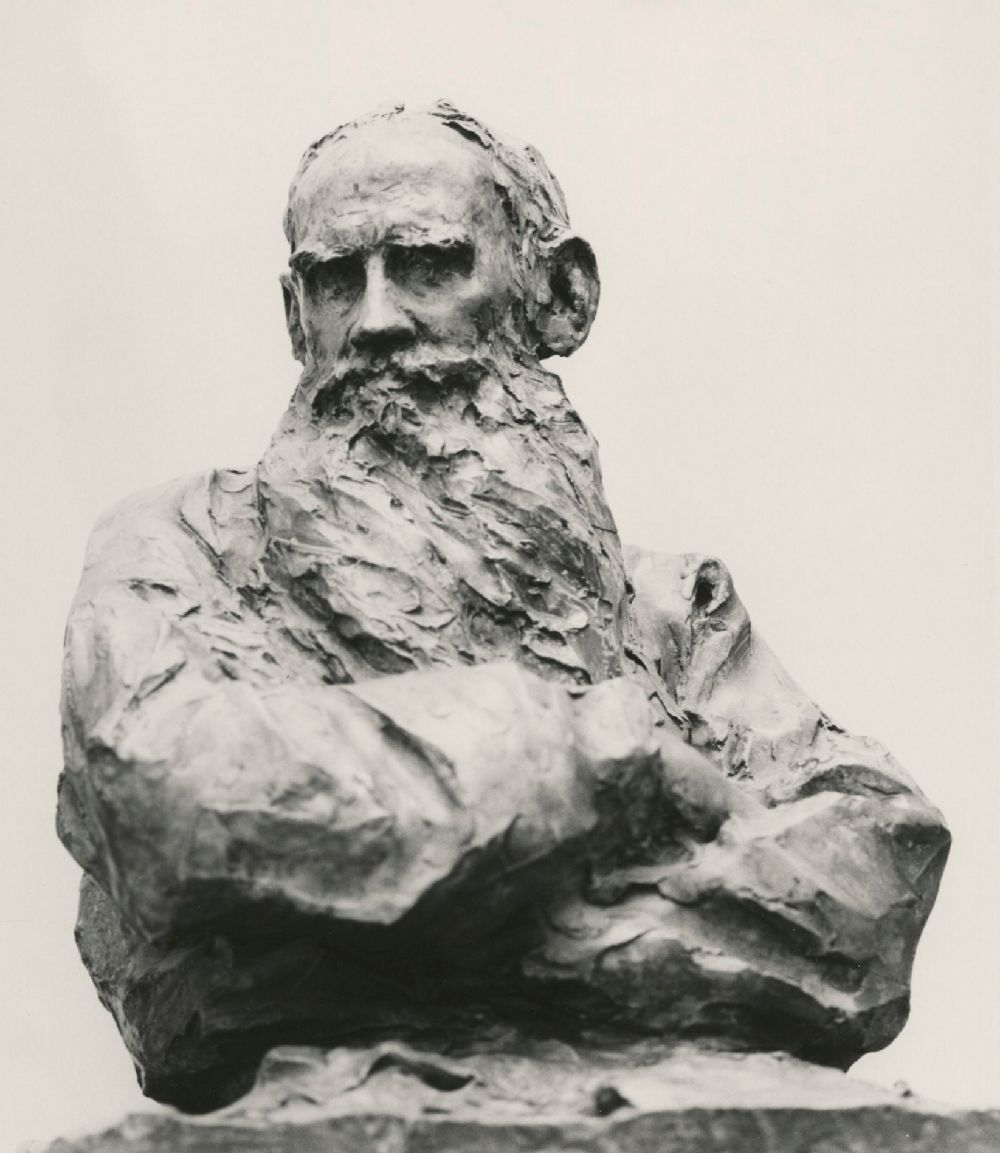
Paolo Troubetzkoy, Portrait of Leo Tolstoy, 1890, photo by David Finn, David Finn Archive, Department of Image Collections, National Gallery of Art Library, Washington, DC

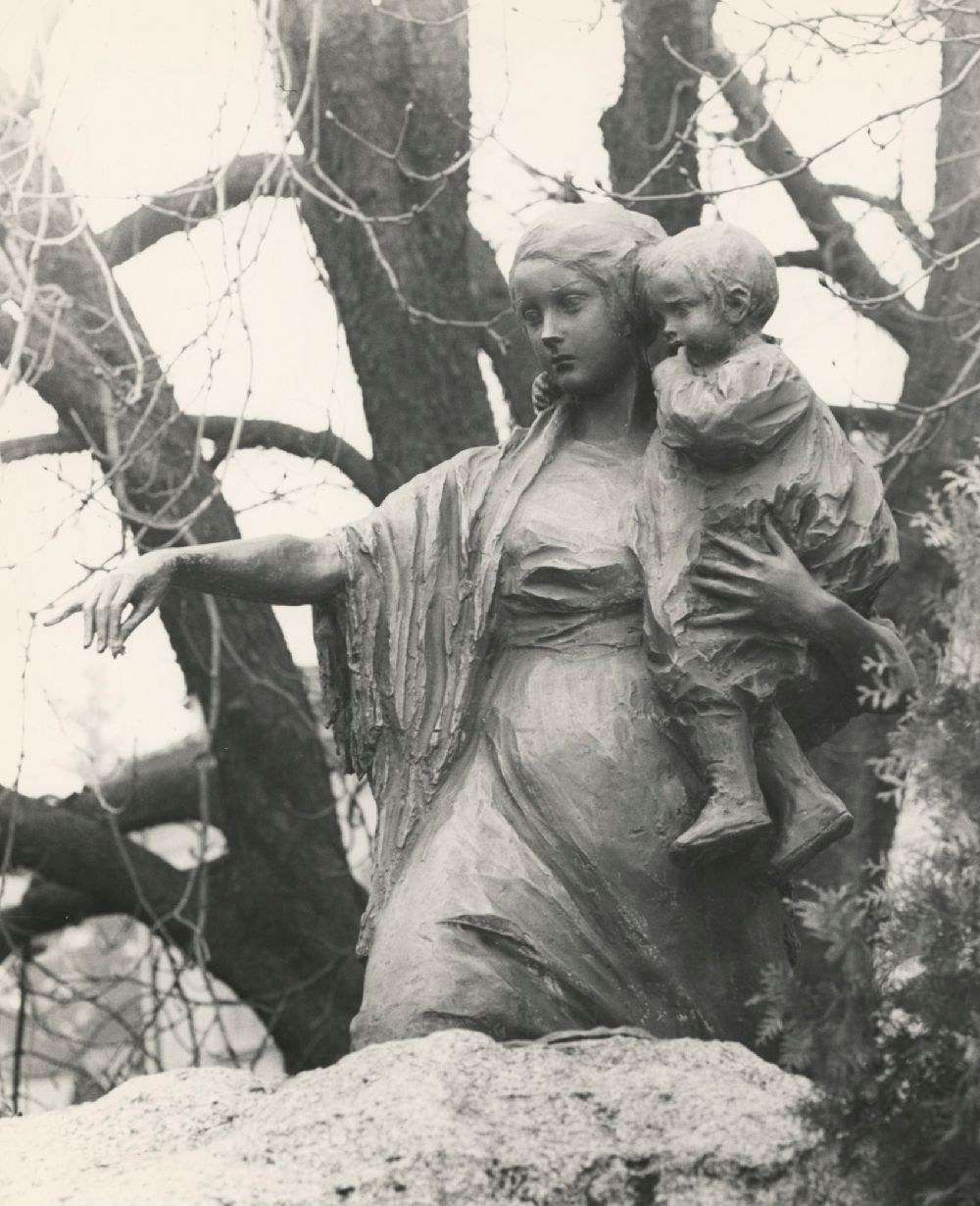
Paolo Troubetzkoy, Memorial to Italian Soldiers of WWI, 1923, photo by David Finn, David Finn Archive, Department of Image Collections, National Gallery of Art Library, Washington, DC

== Expositions ==
- Paris Expo 1900 (gran premio). In: AIC
- De Young Museum (bust of Michael de Young)
- Biennale di Venezia 1922. (37 works).
- Galleria Nazionale (Rome)
- WWAA 1938

== Exhibitions ==
The American Numismatic Society displayed Sculpture by Prince Paul Troubetzkoy at the Hispanic Society of America from 12 February to 12 March 1911. Catalog. The introduction to the catalog was written by Christian Brinton. The show was later displayed at the Albright Art Gallery, Buffalo, 27 March to 27 April 1911.

The Art Institute of Chicago exhibited Sculpture and Portraits by Prince Paul Troubetzkoy from 1 February – 28 February 1912. Catalog.

The Knoedler Gallery exhibited Portraits in bronze and marble by Paul Troubetzkoy from 16 – 28 February 1914.

From 30 September 2025 to 11 January 2026, the Musée d'Orsay exhibited a retrospective of his work in Paul Troubetzkoy Sculpteur (1866-1938). The exhibit was organized by the Musée d'Orsay and Galleria d'Arte Moderna Milano where it will be titled Paul Troubetzkoy: The Sculptor of the Belle Époque and on display 27 February – 28 June 2026. The catalog (in French) was edited by Édouard Papet, Anne-Lise Desmas, Cécilie Champy-Vinas, and Omar Cucciniello (ISBN 978-8-833-67332-5).

== The Troubetzkoy Archive Project ==
The Troubetzkoy Archive Project provides a central database for the works of Paul Troubetzkoy. It was created by James Drake on behalf of the Museo del Paesaggio in Verbania, where more than 300 Troubetzkoy's plaster works are preserved.

== See also ==
- Trubetskoy family
