= Principality of Trubetsk =

Former country in Eastern Europe

- 1164–1657
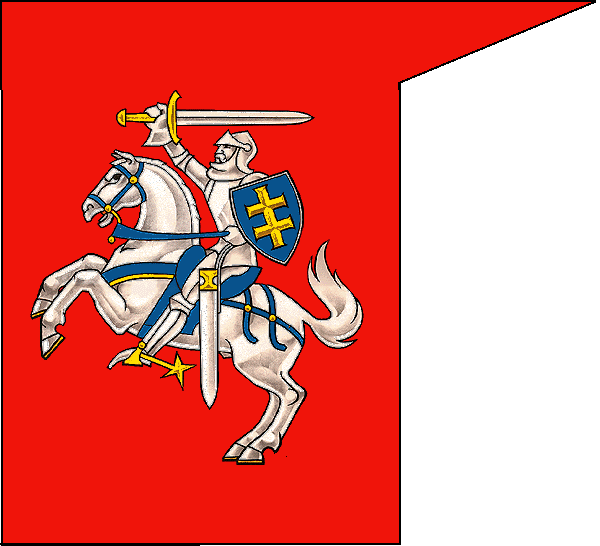
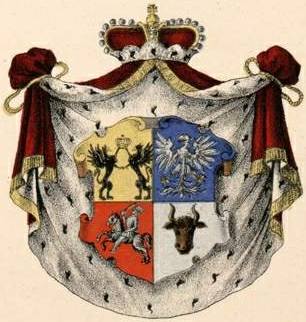
- Flag Coat of arms

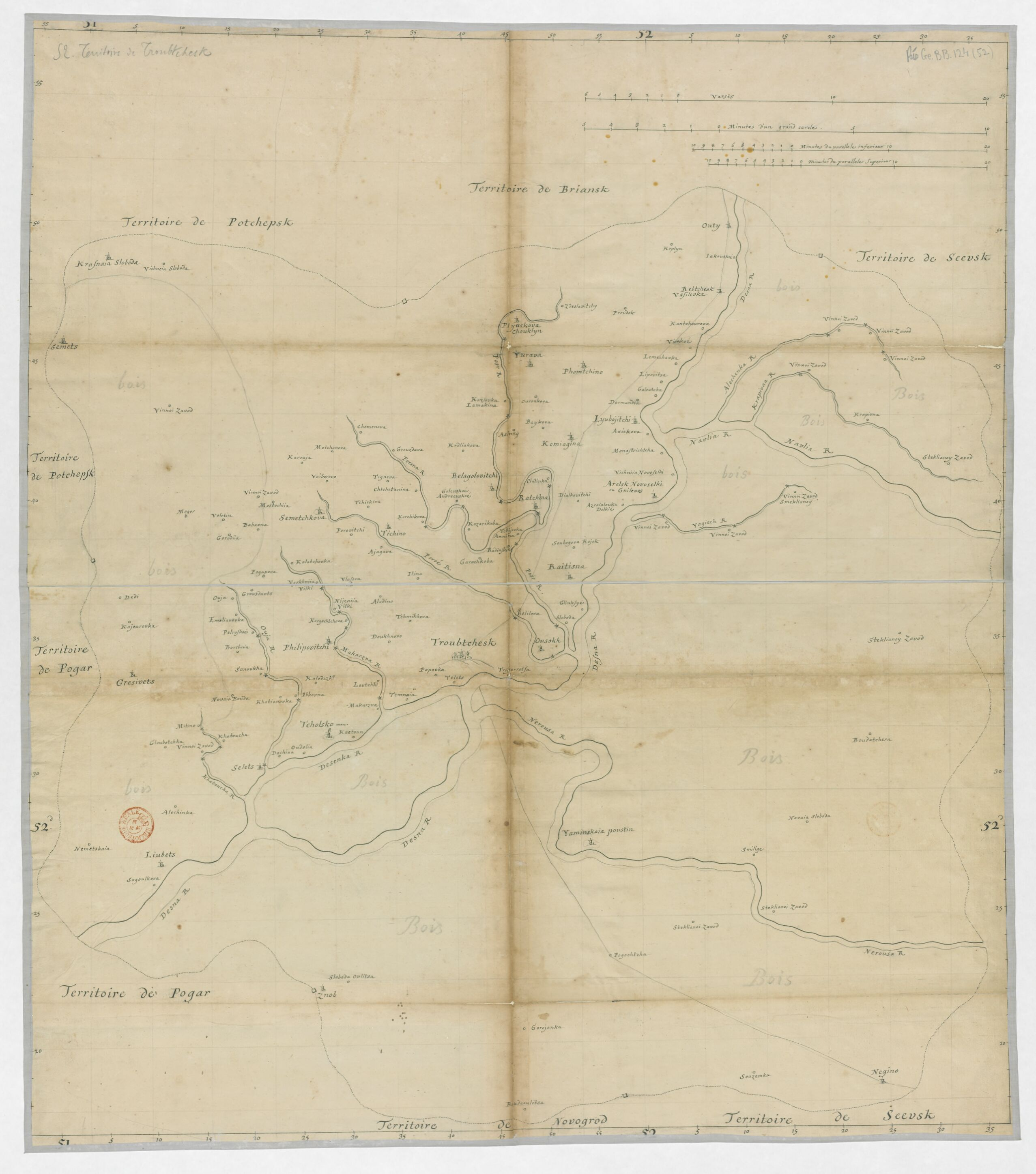
- The Principality of Trubetsk was located on the later territory of Smoleńsk Voivodeship.
- Capital: Trubetsk
- Common languages: Ruthenian
- Religion: Eastern Orthodox
- Government: Principality
- Prince of Trubetsk
  - 1164-1196: Vsevolod Svyatoslavich (first)
  - 1657–1657: Jerzy Wigunt Trubecki (last)
- History
  - Established: 1164
  - Disestablished: 1657
- Currency: Denar, Grosz, Zloty
Preceded by	Succeeded by
Novgorod-Seversk	Tsardom of Russia

The Principality of Trubetsk (Russian: Трубецкое княжество) was a small, landlocked country in Eastern Europe. Its capital Trubetsk (Trubchevsk) is situated about 50 miles (80 kilometres) southwest of Bryansk.

== Middle Ages ==
The Trubetsk (Trubchevsk) town was referred to in the Old East Slavic poem The Tale of Igor's Campaign where, among others, Vsevolod Svyatoslavich, the Prince of Trubetsk and of Kursk, was glorified. In 1185 the Trubetsk army fought against Cumans.

In 1239, after the Mongol invasion of Rus, the Principality of Trubetsk passed to the Princes of Bryansk, and then to the Princes of Trubetsk. In the later Middle Ages it was bordered by the Grand Duchy of Lithuania to its west and by Muscovy to its east.

== Modern history ==
In 1566 Ivan IV the Terrible took the principality during the Livonian War.

In 1609 Vasili IV of Russia relinquished it to the Polish–Lithuanian Commonwealth during the Polish–Muscovite War (1605–1618).

In 1654 Prince Aleksey Trubetskoy on the side of Alexis I of Russia led the southern flank of the Muscovian army from Bryansk to Ukraine. The territory between the Dniepr and Berezyna was overrun, with Aleksey Trubetskoy taking Mstsislaw (Mstislavl) and Roslavl.

In 1654 the Principality of Trubetsk was finally conquered by Aleksey Trubetskoy, Prince of Trubetsk himself, as a result of the Russo-Polish War (1654-1667).

== See also ==
- Bibliography of Russian history
