= Trubetskoy family =

Ruthenian Gediminid noble family

The Princes Trubetskoy Князья Трубецкие
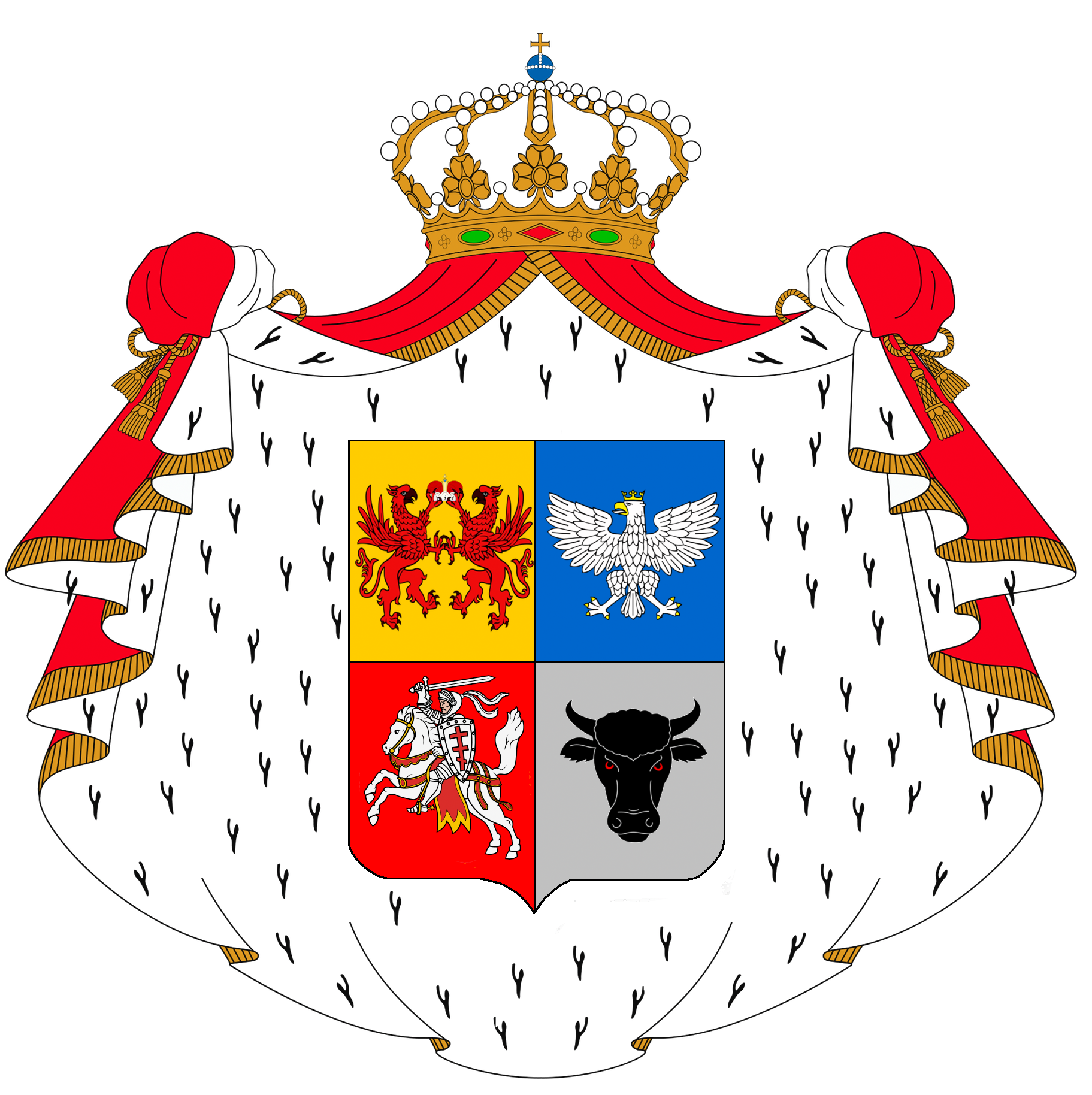
- The Trubetskoy coat of arms
- Parent house: Gediminids
- Country: Russia
- Current region: Russia, France, United States, Germany, Switzerland
- Earlier spellings: Trubchevsky
- Origin: Grand Duchy of Lithuania
- Members: Prince Dmitrii Troubetzkoy, d. 1625; Prince Sergei Petrovich Troubetzkoy, August 29, 1790 – November 22, 1860; Prince Paolo Troubetzkoy (Intra, Italy, 15 February 1866 — Pallanza, 12 February 1938); Prince Nikolai Troubetzkoy (Moscow, 16 April 1890 – Vienna, 25 June 1938)

The House of Trubetskoy (Note: Russian: Трубецкие, romanized: Trubetskiye; Belarusian: Трубяцкі, romanized: Trubiacki; Polish: Trubecki; Ruthenian: Trubetsky; Ukrainian: Трубецький, romanized: Trubets'kyy; French: Troubetzkoy; Croatian: Trubić; Estonian: Trubetski; German: Trubezkoi; Swedish: Trubetskoj) is a Russian noble family of Ruthenian stock and Lithuanian origin, like many other princely houses of Grand Duchy of Lithuania, later prominent in Russian history, science, and arts. They are descended from Algirdas's son Demetrius I Starshy (1327 – 12 August 1399). They used the Pogoń Litewska coat of arms and the Trubetsky coat of arms.

== Sovereign rule ==
Princes Troubetzkoy descend from Demetrius I Starshy, one of Algirdas's sons, who ruled the towns of Bryansk and Starodub. He was killed together with his elder sons in the Battle of the Vorskla River (1399). Demetrius's descendants continued to rule the town of Trubetsk (Troubchevsk) until the 1530s, when they had to convert to Roman Catholicism or leave their patrimony and settle in Moscow. They chose the latter, and were accepted with great ceremony at the court of Vasili III of Russia.

== Time of Troubles ==
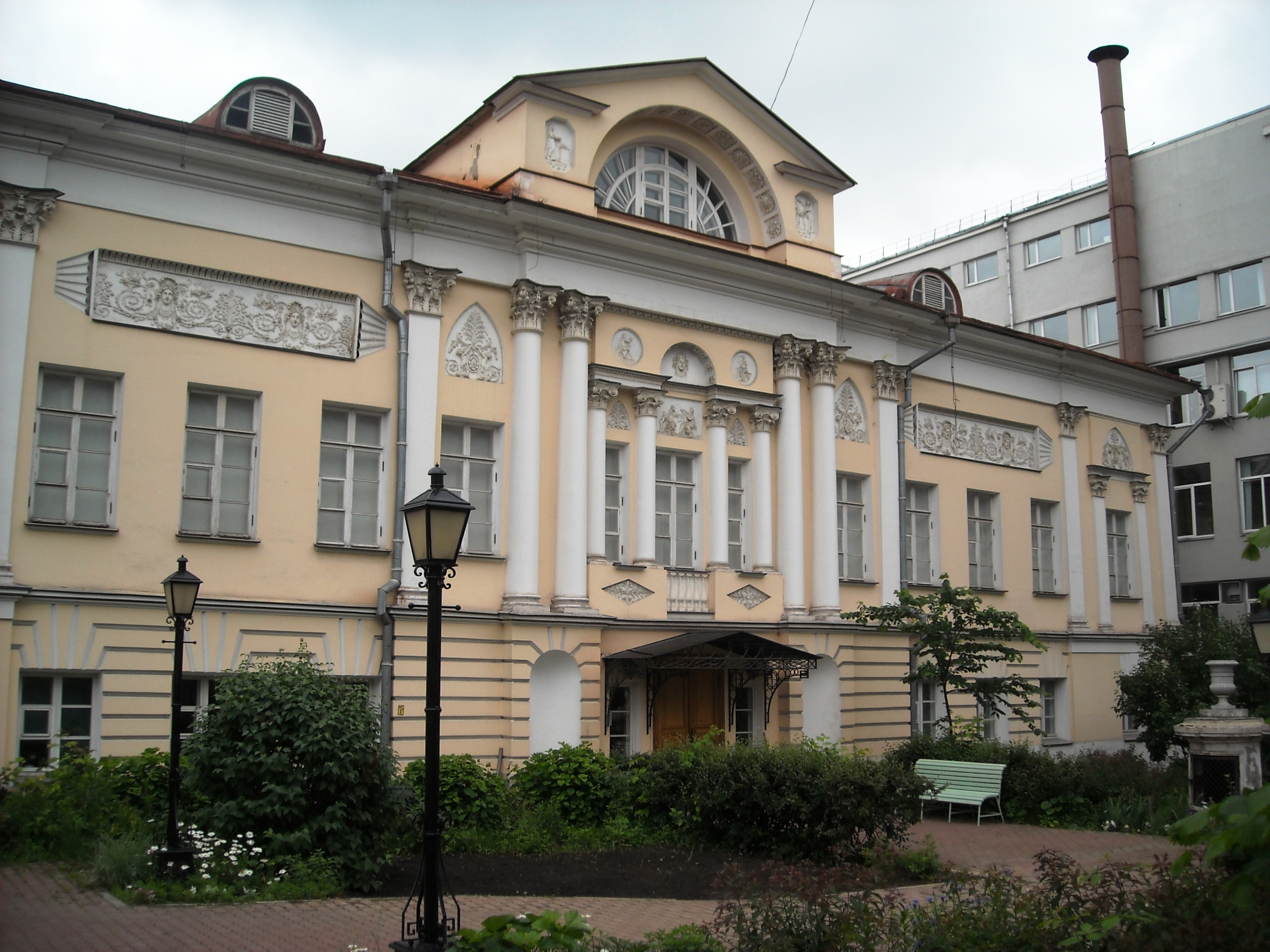
Trubetskoy Mansion, Petrovskij Pereulok, Moscow, designed by Joseph Bové

Undoubtedly, the most prominent of early Troubetzkoys was Prince Dmitry Timofeievich Troubetzkoy, who helped Prince Dmitry Pozharsky to raise a volunteer army and deliver Moscow from the Poles in 1612. The Time of Troubles over, Dmitry was addressed by people as "Liberator of the Motherland" and asked to accept the Tsar's throne. He contented himself, however, with the governorship of Siberia and the title of the Duke (derzhavets) of Shenkursk. Prince Dmitry died on May 24, 1625, and was interred in the Trinity Lavra of St. Sergius.

Quite different was a stance of his first cousin, Prince Wigund-Jeronym Troubetzkoy. He supported the Poles and followed them to Polish–Lithuanian Commonwealth after the Time of Troubles. Here his descendants were given enviable positions at the court and married into other princely families of Poland. By the 1660s, however, the only Troubetzkoy left, Prince Yuriy Troubetzkoy, returned to Moscow and was given a boyar title by Tsar Alexis of Russia of the House of Romanov. All the branches of the family descend from his marriage to Princess Irina Galitzina.

== Members ==
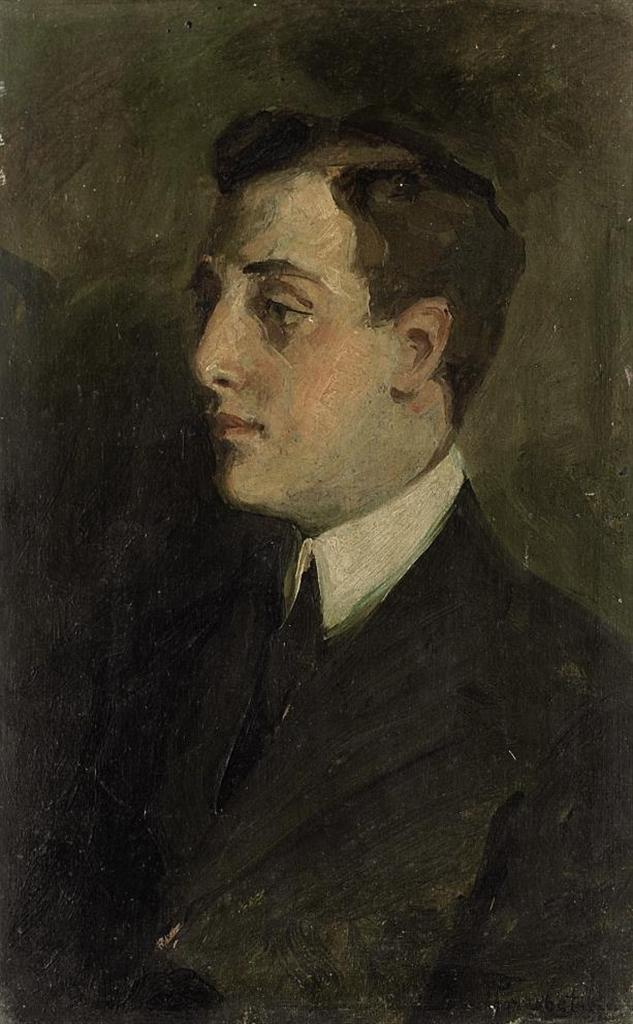
Portrait of Vladimiro Notarbartolo Di Villarosa by Prince Pierre Troubetzkoy (1906)

- Prince Alexis S. Troubetzkoy, 1934–2017, historian, educator
- Princess Amélie Rives Troubetzkoy, 1863–1945, American novelist, poet, playwright, married to Prince Pierre Troubetzkoy, artist (1864-1936)
- Prince Dmitrii Timofeyevich Troubetzkoy, d. 1625, Savior of the Motherland during the Time of Troubles
- Prince Evgenii Nikolaevitch Troubetzkoy, 1863–1920, religious philosopher, professor, publicist, lawyer, public figure.
- Prince Igor Nikolayevich Troubetzkoy (Moscow, 23 August 1912, Paris, France – 20 December 2008), driver of the first Ferrari to compete in Grand Prix motor racing. Fourth husband of the American heiress Barbara Hutton.
- Prince Ivan Yurievich Trubetskoy, 1667–1750, Russian field marshal, Boyar
- Prince Nikita Yurievich Trubetskoy, 1699–1767, Russian statesman, Field Marshal
- Prince Nikolai Sergeyevich Troubetzkoy (Moscow, April 16, 1890 – Vienna, June 25, 1938) Russian linguist, historian.
- Prince Nikolai Petrovitch Troubetzkoy, 1828–1900, father of Sergei Nikolaevich Trubetskoy and Evgenii Nikolaevitch Troubetzkoy, co-founder and Chairman of the Russian Musical Society in Moscow, co-founder of the Moscow Conservatory
- Prince Paolo Troubetzkoy (Intra, Italy, 15 February 1866 – Pallanza, 12 February 1938), artist, sculptor
- Prince Pyotr Petrovich Troubetzkoy, 1822–1892, Russian diplomat, botanist, father of Paolo Troubetzkoy and Pierre Troubetzkoy.
- Prince Pierre Troubetzkoy (1864-1936), artist and second husband of Amélie Rives
- Prince Sergei Nikolaevich Trubetskoy, 1862–1905, Russian religious philosopher, first elected Rector of Moscow University
- Prince Sergei Petrovich Troubetzkoy, August 29, 1790 – November 22, 1860, Decembrist
- Wladimir Troubetzkoy, 10 October 1942 – 2 June 2009, French literary historian
- Prince Youcca Troubetzkoy, also Nicolas Barclay, George Fairwood, (December 12, 1905 – April 22, 1992) French-American actor.
- Prince Yuriy Petrovich Trubetskoy, 1643–1679, Ruthenian prince, Boyar
- Prince Yuri Yurievich Trubetzkoy, 1668–1739, Russian General, Senator
- Maria Trubetskaia, 1696–1747, Russian noblewoman and lady-in-waiting to Anna of Russia and Elisabeth of Russia.
