= Wladimir Troubetzkoy =

French literary historian (1942–2009)

Wladimir Troubetzkoy (10 October 1942 – 26 May 2009) was a French literary historian of Polish-Belarusian-Russian origin.

Growing up as a member of the aristocratic Russian family Troubetzkoy in exile in France, but speaking the Russian language at home, he graduated with a degree in Literature from the École normale supérieure and is a docteur d'État. He was Professor of Comparative literature at the University of Versailles (Université de Versailles-Saint-Quentin-en-Yvelines) and director of the Institute of Arts, Science, Culture and Multimedia (Institut Universitaire Professionalisant Arts, Sciences Culture et Multimédia).

== Select bibliography ==
- L'Aristocratie et le rôle de l'écrivain dans la littérature européenne de la première moitié du XIXe siècle (1989 [diss.]).
- "De l'art d'accommoder les grands-mères: La Belle et le Chaperon." Littératures 24 (1991): 29-52
- Le Double, études recueillies par Jean Bessière; avec la collab. de Antonia Fonyi, 1995.
- La Figure du double, textes réunis et présentés par Wladimir Troubetzkoy. Paris : Didier érudition, 1995
- "Vladimir Nabokov's Despair: the reader as 'April's Fool'", Cycnos (12:2) 1995, 55–62.
- L'ombre et la différence : le double en Europe. 1re éd. Paris : Presses universitaires de France, c1996
- LiOtérature comparée, sous la direction de Didier Souiller avec la collaboration de Wladimir Troubetzkoy; avec la contribution de Dominique Budor... (Collection Premier cycle, ISSN 1158-6028) Paris : Presses universitaires de France, 1997
- Saint-Pétersbourg : mythe littéraire. Paris : Presses universitaires de France, 2003.
- Fratries : frères et soeurs dans la littérature et les arts, de l'Antiquité à nos jours, sous la direction de Florence Godeau et Wladimir Troubetzkoy; ouvrage publié avec le concours du Centre national du livre et de l'Université de Versailles-St. Quentin. (Société française de littérature générale et comparée. Congrès (31 : 2002 : Université de Versailles-Saint Quentin en Yvelines). Paris : Kimé, c2003.

== See also ==
- Troubetzkoy
