= Belarusian Scout Association =

Scouting organization in Belarus

Ab'yadnannye Belaruskikh Skautaǔ
- Belarusian Scout Association
- Location: Minsk
- Country: Belarus
- Founded: 1991
- Membership: 1,500

The Belarusian Scout Association (ABS, Belarusian: Аб`яднанне Беларускiх Скаўтаў, transliterated Ab'yadnannye Belaruskikh Skaǔtaǔ) is one of the nationwide Scouting organizations in Belarus. The association was founded in 1991 and liquidated in 2005 by the Supreme Court of Belarus, but still continues to operate. In 1995, the association served about 1,500 members.

== History and program ==
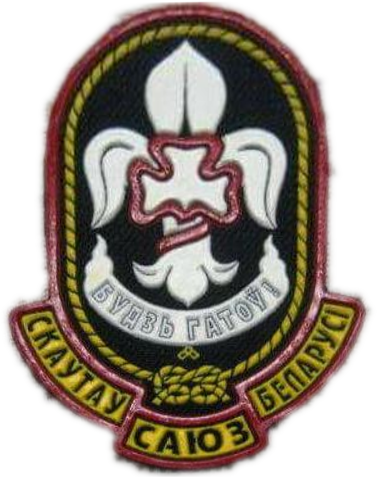
Current membership badge of the Belarusian Scout Association.

The Belarusian Scout Association is an independent non-profit organization of children, youth and adults, descended from traditions of the World Scout Movement and from the Belarusian Scout troops and Belarusian Scout Association Abroad (BSAA; Аб`яднання Беларускiх Скаўтаў за мяжой, АБСМ), which existed from 1945 to 1951 in Germany.

The Belarusian Scout Association was founded in 1991 by a small group of people from various cities, based in Minsk, officially registered in April, 1992, and had approximately 1,500 members as of 1995. Groups existed in the capital, as well as Baranavichy, Buiki, Homyel, Hrodna, Rahačoŭ, Ruba, and Vileika. The chairperson in 1998 was Nikolai Grakov. Critics of the pro-Russian Belarusian Republican Scout Association saw it as a government mouthpiece and direct descendant of the communist Pioneers, whitewashed for western consumption. Hence, the dissident, Belarusian and democratically oriented Belarusian Scout Association had stayed separate, and largely underground due to political constraints. The ABS bought a country house to use as a camping center and organized regional camps there in the summer of 2003. One of the ABS regional newsletters became a citywide school paper with around 1000 circulation, as of 2004. The association was liquidated in 2005 by the Supreme Court of Belarus, but still continues to operate.

The Scout Motto of ABS is Напагатове! (Napahatove!), Be Prepared in the Belarusian language. The Belarusian noun for a single Scout is Скаўт. The official language of ABS is Belarusian.

The Scout emblem incorporates the Cross of Lorraine, due to its appearance in the former national coat of arms of Belarus, the Pahonia.

== See also ==
- Scouting in Belarus

== Gallery ==
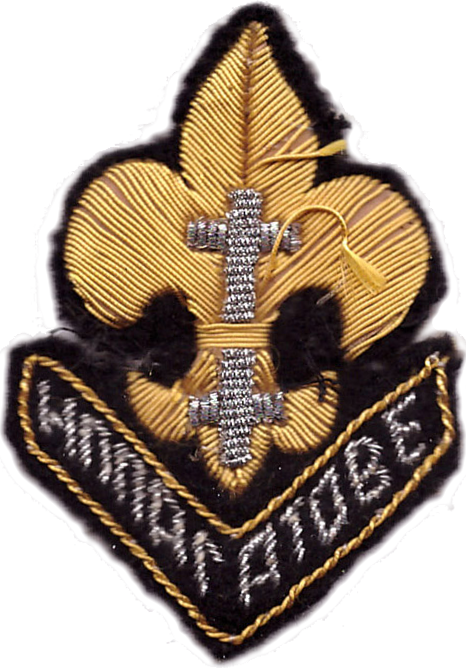
Old Belarusian Scout badge, which existed from 1945 to 1951 in Germany

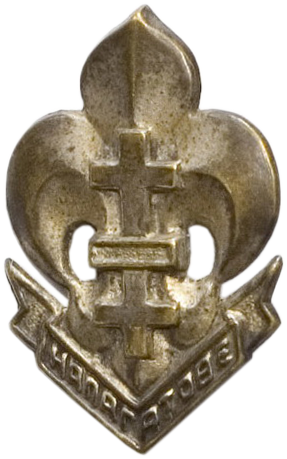
Membership badge of the Belarusian Scout Association Abroad (BSAA), which existed from 1945 to 1951 in Germany
