= Belarusian Republican Scout Association =

Scouting organization in Belarus

Белорусская республиканская скаутская ассоциация
- Country: Belarus
- Founded: 1989 (predecessors); 1998 (official)
- Membership: 1,200

The Republican Scout Association of Belarus (Russian: Белорусская республиканская скаутская ассоциация, Belorusskaya respublikanskaya skautskaya assotsiatsiya, Belarusian: Беларуская рэспубліканская скаўцкая асацыяцыя, BRSA) is one of several nationwide Scouting associations in Belarus. It is the body recognized by the World Organization of the Scout Movement from 1998 to 2004 and again from September 5, 2010.

On October 1, 2023, the association joined the European Scout Region, as the Eurasian region was dissolved.

Initially, the organization was called the National Scout Association of Belarus (Belarusian: Беларуская Нацыянальная Скаўцкая Асацыяцыя, romanized: Belaruskaya Natsianalnaya Skautskaya Asatsiyatsia, BNSA) from 1998 to 1999.

== Belarus Scouting history ==
The first Scout groups were established in Belarus in 1909 while it was part of the Russian Empire, and disbanded by the Soviets in 1922.

Belarusian Scouting was reborn and reorganized in 1989. The National Organization of Russian Scouts (NORS), based in Australia, is assisting the rebirth of Scouting in Belarus. Belarusian Scouts have regular contacts and exchanges with members of Scouts et Guides de France and the CIS Scout associations. Belaruskaya Natsianalnaya Skautskaya Asatsiyatsia joined the World Organization of the Scout Movement effective March 13, 1998 as the Scout association representing Belarus.

== Belarusian Republican Scout Association ==
World Scouting News, March, 1998, reported "The Belarusian National Scout Association includes more than 7,500 members, both boys and girls, in three branches ranging from 8 to 17 years of age. They are spread all over the country but the majority of members come from the major cities."

"In December 1991, a national coordinating committee was set up under the aegis of WOSM in order to promote the unification of the various Scout Associations which appeared in different parts of the country. Scouting grew steadily with support from the Christian Orthodox Church... as well as the Youth Commission of the National Assembly of the Republic of Belarus." In March 1997, as a result of a long process of reconciling divergent nationalistic trends in Scouting, a constituent assembly was held in Minsk. This assembly approved the creation of a united National Scout Association.

World Scouting News further reported "The Belaruskaya Natsianalnaya Skautskaya Asatsiyatsia regularly invites underprivileged children, some of them coming from the Chernobyl contaminated areas, to some of their national summer camps."

The Scouts et Guides de France are working with Scouting in Belarus. Guidisme et Scoutisme en Belgique/Gidsen- en Scoutsbeweging in België has provided support in the region of the city of Homyel.

The coeducational BRSA had 3,408 members as of 2004. WOSM membership was terminated on March 31, 2004 by the World Scout Committee. WOSM now lists the country as a potential member.

=== Controversies ===
The BRSA was provisionally suspended for "Non-adherence to the Constitution of the Organization and nonfunctioning as a democratic National Scout Movement" in 2002, after "Complaints (...) received from unrecognised groups within the country about the conduct of the recognised NSO", which led to a report by WOSM's Chairman of the Constitutions Committee, demanding a legitimate general assembly and an independent auditing of its accounts.

There was also an earlier provisional suspension for non-payment of membership fees.

The Scout Motto is Bud' Gotov, Be Prepared in Russian, as BRSA does not use the Belarusian language, Russian is the sole official language. The name of the organisation in Belarusian is Беларуская рэспубліканская скаўцкая асацыяцыя (Biełaruskaja respublikanskaja skaŭckaja asacyjacyja). The Russian noun for a single Scout is Скаут, in Belarusian - Скаўт.

The membership badge of the BRSA incorporates the Patriarchal cross of Eastern European iconography.

== See also ==
- Scouting in Belarus
- Association of Belarusian Guides
- Belarusian Republican Youth Union
