= Scouting and Guiding in Belarus =

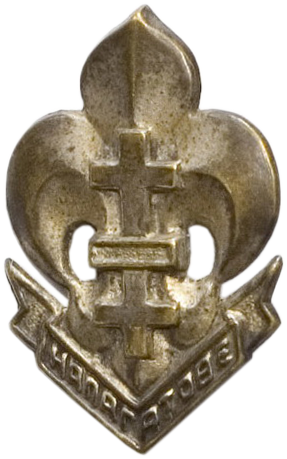
Membership badge of the Belarusian Scout Association Abroad (BSAA), which existed from 1945 to 1951 in Germany. The emblem features the traditional motto Напагатове!.

The Scout movement in Belarus consisted of 1200 members when it joined the World Organization of the Scout Movement (WOSM) in 2010. There are at least five nationwide associations as well as some regional associations. In addition, there were at one time Scouts-in-Exile in metropolitan areas of the United States, and there are presently international Scout units in Belarus.

== History ==
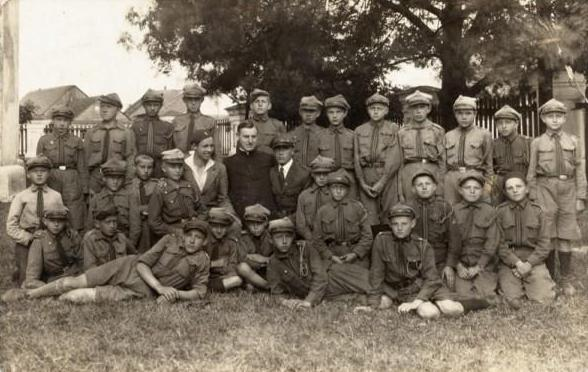
Scout troop in Kletsk, Belarus 1934

The initial development of Scouting in Belarus took place within the Russian Scout movement, which was headed by general Oleg Pantyukhov. Belarus was a part of the Russian Empire at that time. The first Scout organisations were not independent. Instead they were totally a part of the Russian Scout movement. They first gathered in Gomel. In 1912 several Boy- and Girl-Scout organisations existed in Gomel. They were Russian, Polish and Jewish. In 1915 there were already 170 little wolves (this nickname was used to call children aged from 7 to 11 years). Russian Scout organisations that were a part of Organization of Russian Young Pathfinders existed in other towns of Belarus. In 1922 after the end of Russian Civil War Scouting had been banned by the Soviet Union, and Scout activities ended. In April 1926 many leaders and members were arrested and imprisoned by Joint State Political Directorate. Most of them were sent to Solovki prison camp. Some of the Scouts and Scout-leaders fled abroad. They later continued their activity in National Organization of Russian Scouts. Russian exiles in France turned cadets into Scouts, but in a more Catholic (local French) manner. Some of them where officers from Belarusian families, who immigrated to France after World War I.

West Belarus became a part of the Second Polish Republic according to the Peace of Riga after Polish–Soviet War. Along with the new Polish authorities Polish Scouting and Guiding Association spread in Belarus. A Scout organization was founded in Kletsk, and Scouts appeared in Nyasvizh and other nearby villages. In 1929, American Methodists helped found a Girl Scout organization in Vilnius (which was named Vilna at that time). It lasted until 1929.

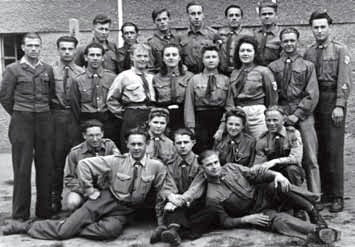
The founders of the Belarusian Scouting in the West. Regensburg, spring 1946.

In the period following World War II, ethnic Belarusians gathered in Scout troops in exile and in Scout troops in displaced persons camps throughout Europe, as did Russian Scouts, Ukrainians and Balts. Belarusian Scouts formed the organization Belarusian Scout Association Abroad (Belarusian: Згуртаваньне Беларускіх Скаўтаў на Чужыне, English acronym BSAA, Cyrillic acronym ZBSCh), which existed from 1945 to 1951 in Germany. White Ruthenian Scouts remained active in the United States until at least the 1970s led by Vytaut Kipel, unlike other ethnic organizations under the Boy Scouts of America umbrella. Belarusian scouts participated in the conference of scouts in exile held in New York on July 12, 1952 together with Latvians, Lithuanians, Estonians, Ukrainians, Russians, Poles, Hungarians and Yugoslavs.

Unlike the other organizations, however, the BSAA did not survive to witness the dissolution of the Soviet Union. Whereas Russia, Poland and Ukraine in particular had ready-made Scouting available once allowed in 1990-1991, Belarus had to start essentially from scratch.

Emergence of democratic principles in the mid-1980s made possible the creation of alternatives to the communist pioneer organizations. Close connections were formed with Guide and Scout organizations of many European countries, when children from areas affected by the Chernobyl accident were invited to summer camps abroad during the Chernobyl Children's Project in 1990. Especially close links were developed with Cyprus, and between Minsk and the Guides of Lincolnshire. In 1992, Cyprus was officially appointed Link country to support the development of Guiding in Belarus, and in June 1993 the first conference of the Association of Belarusian Guides was held in Minsk.

== National associations ==
- Belarusian Republican Scout Association (Белорусcкая Республиканская Скаутская Ассоциация), member of WOSM
- The Association of Belarusian Guides, member of the World Association of Girl Guides and Girl Scouts since 1996
- Belarusian Scout Association (Аб`яднанне Беларускiх Скаўтаў), founded in 1991, liquidated in 2005 by the Supreme Court of Belarus
- YMCA Scouting in Belarus

Note: There may have been a link between one of the non-NSAB Belarusian Scout organizations and the Union Internationale des Guides et Scouts d'Europe, a Christian-based Scout alternative, but it is uncertain to whom they were linked.

== Regional associations ==
Several countries have multiple organizations, divided on the basis of religion (for example, France and Denmark), ethnic identification (as is the case in Bosnia and Israel), or language (like Belgium). Belarus instead has regional Scouting organizations. Regional Scouting divisions of Belarus include the GomelScouts in Gomel. Because usage of the Belarusian language and the Russian language are contentious issues in the country, the emblem itself is captioned in English.

== International Scouting units in Belarus ==
- In addition, there are American Boy Scouts in Minsk, serving in Boy Scout Troop 1101, linked to the Direct Service branch of the Boy Scouts of America, which supports units around the world.

== See also ==
- Belarusian Republican Youth Union
- Scouting in displaced persons camps
- Translate be-x-old:Гісторыя скаўтынгу на Беларусі to English
