= Papal Cross =

Papal Cross or papal cross may refer to:

- Papal cross, a vertical bar with three crossbars, as of a symbol of the papacy
- Papal ferula, a rod with crossbar carried by the pope
- Papal Cross, Dublin, a monument for Pope John Paul II's 1979 visit to Ireland
