= Archiepiscopal cross =

The archiepiscopal cross has two cross bars.

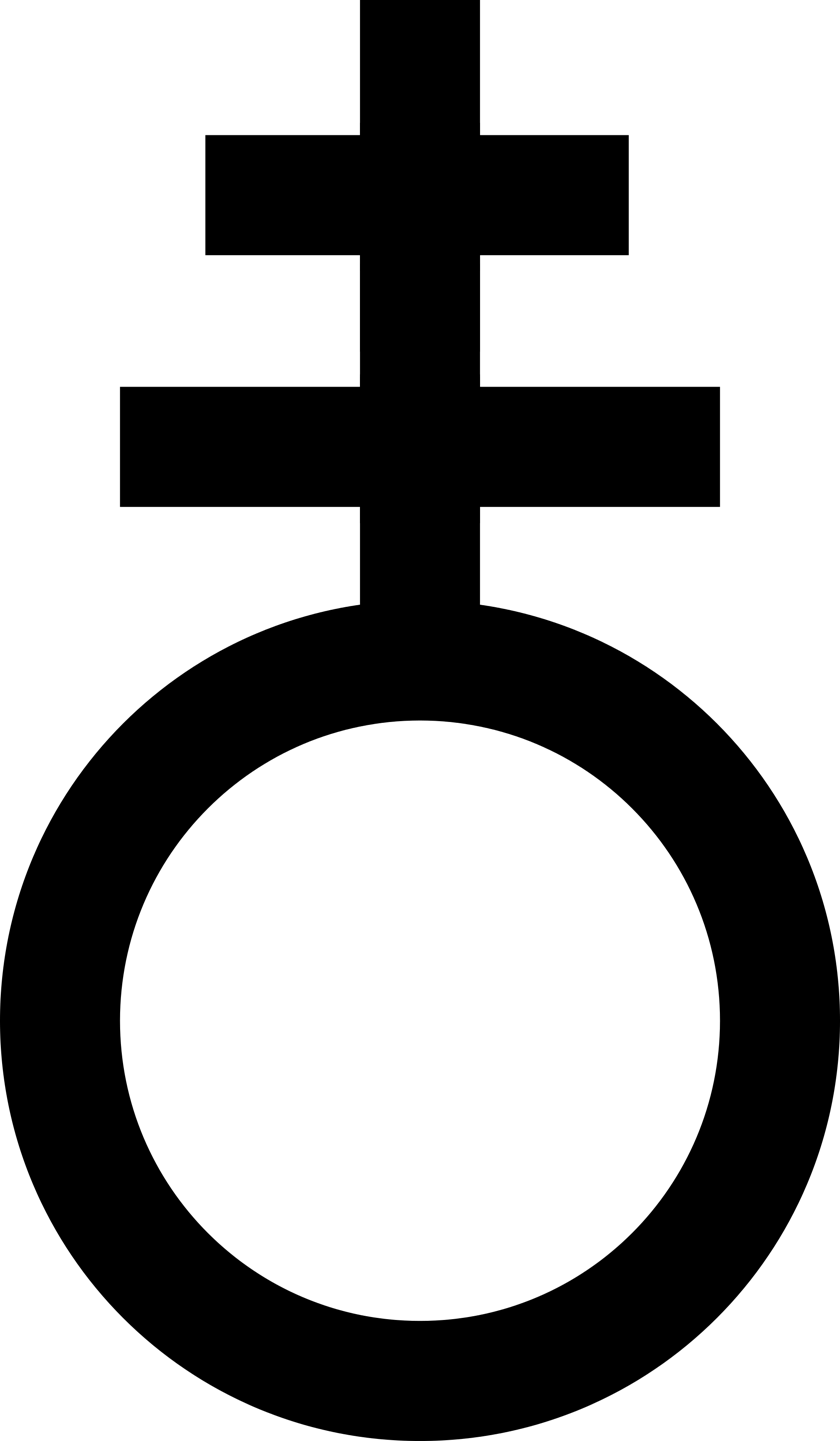
Archbishop symbol

An archiepiscopal cross (archbishop's cross) is a two-barred cross used by or to signify or dignify an archbishop. Similar to the patriarchal cross, it is typically made like a staff with the two barred cross up top and a very long downwards extending arm.
