= Two-barred cross =

Cross symbol with two horizontal bars

Version of the Cross of Lorraine

A two-barred cross or double cross is similar to a Latin cross but with an extra bar added. The lengths and placement of the bars (or "arms") vary, and most of the variations are interchangeably called the cross of Lorraine, the patriarchal cross, the Orthodox cross or the archiepiscopal cross.

== The two bars ==
The two bars can be placed tight together (condensed) or far apart. They can be symmetrically spaced either around the middle, or above or below the middle. One asymmetrical variation has one bar near the top and the other just below the middle. The bars can be of equal length, or with one shorter than the other. The upper bar, which is normally shorter, is widely held to represent the sign "I.N.R.I" (Iesus Nazarenus, Rex Iudaeorum ― Jesus of Nazareth, King of the Jews) that was placed above Christ's head at the Crucifixion.

== Decorations ==
The ends of the arms may be decorated according to different styles. A style with round or rounded ends is called treflée or botonée (from French bouton) in heraldic use. The same style is called budded, apostles' or cathedral cross in religious use. A straight and pointy style called pattée also includes maltese cross variations, and finally a pointed style called aiguisé.

== Heraldic use ==
Coat of arms of Hungary, late 12th century

Coat of arms of the Slovak Republic

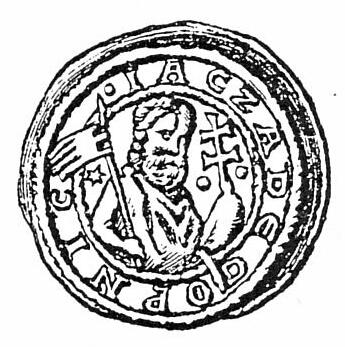
A bracteate of Iakša de Kopnik Jacza de Copnic, minted in Silesia since the early 12th century.

The crosses appear in heraldic use in the second century A.D. A balanced cross is used in the Coat of arms of Hungary as well as in several small shields within shields of Vytis. An outlined balanced cross (equal length outlined bars on equal distances) is used on coat of arms shields and order medals.

The Cross of Lorraine came from the Kingdom of Hungary to the Duchy of Lorraine. In Hungary, Béla III was the first king to use the two-barred cross as the symbol of royal power in the late 12th century. He probably adopted it from the Byzantine Empire, according to historian Pál Engel, having lived for a time in the imperial court in Constantinople.

A golden double cross with equal bars, known as the Cross of Jagiellons, was used by Grand Duke of Lithuania and King of Poland Jogaila after his conversion to Christianity in 1386, as a personal insignia, and it was introduced into the coat of arms of Lithuania. Jogaila's wife was Saint Hedwig of Poland, the daughter of Louis I of Hungary.

In Slovakia, the flag, the coat of arms, and several municipal symbols include a double cross, in which graded bars are more common than equally long bars, and balanced distances along the vertical line are more common.

The two-barred cross was also, since circa 1140, used in Kopnik, Branibor (currently Berlin, Brandenburg) as seen on one of the five emissions of the silver bracteate of Iakša (Jaxa), a Christian state, fief of Poland (archbishops of Gniezno), coined until its invasion and destruction by Germanic "Wendish Crusade" of 1147.

== In print ==
In typography the double cross (U+2021 ‡) is called double dagger, double obelisk, or diesis.

== In medicine and botany ==
The International Union Against Tuberculosis and Lung Disease has used a red two-barred cross as its logo since 1920, following a proposal at the 1902 Berlin International Conference on Tuberculosis. The two equally long bars are on the upper half of the cross and all six ends are aiguisé. A similar but blue two-barred cross is used as the logo of the American Lung Association.

In botany, a balanced cross (equal length bars on equal distances) is used to mark very poisonous plants.

== In chess ==
A two-barred cross is used to symbolize checkmate.

== Gallery ==
Patriarchal cross

Jagiellonian cross

Orthodox cross

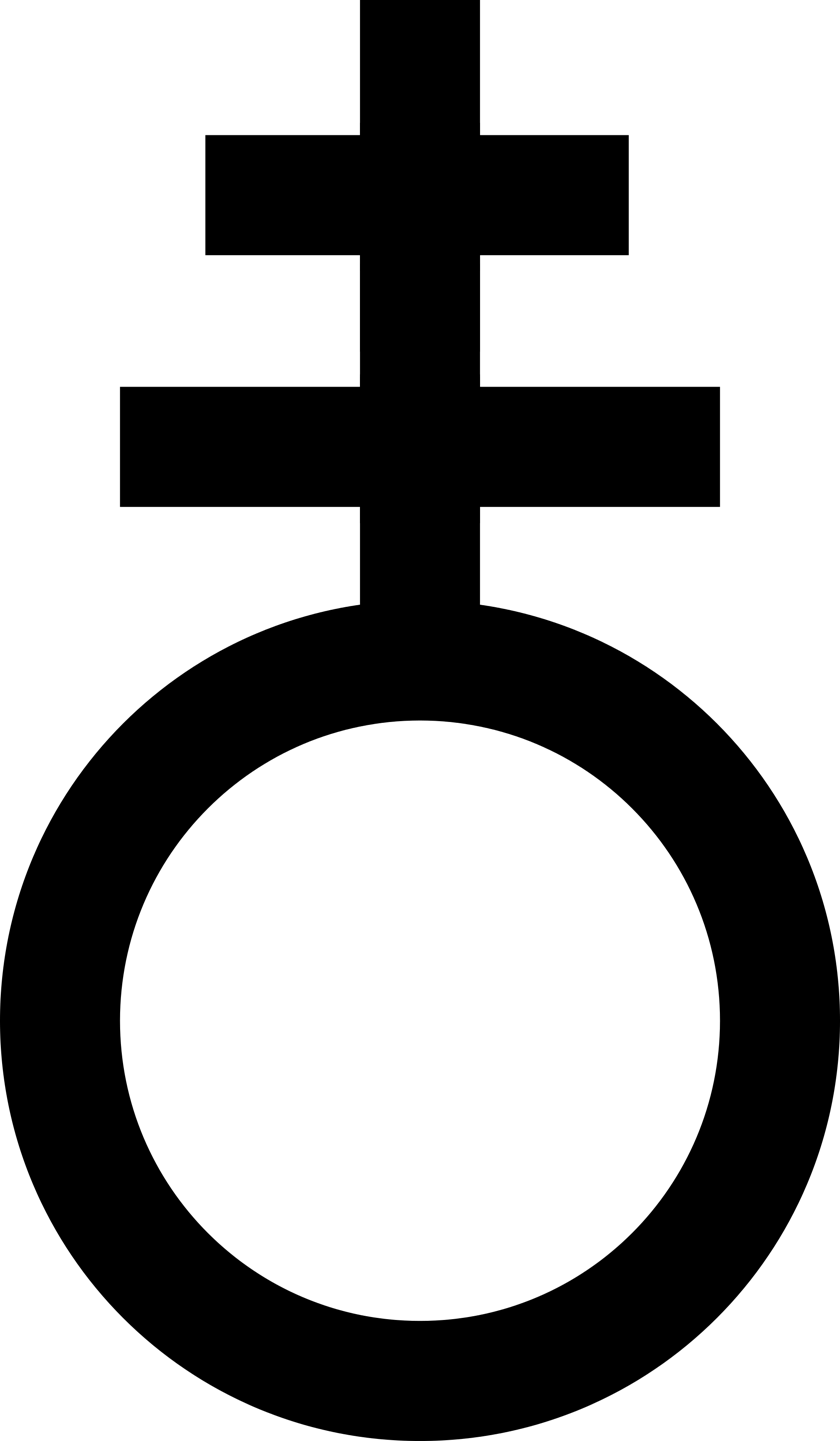
Archiepiscopal cross

Leviathan cross

== Sources ==
- Engel, Pál (2001). The Realm of St Stephen: A History of Medieval Hungary, 895–1526. I.B. Tauris Publishers. ISBN 1-86064-061-3.
- Monter, William (2007). A Bewitched Duchy: Lorraine and its Dukes, 1477-1736. Librairie Droz. ISBN 978-2-600-01165-5.
