= Buyki =

Buyki (Belarusian: Буйкі, Russian: Буйки) may refer to the following places in Belarus:

- Buyki, Astravyets District, a village in Astravyets District, Grodno Region
- Buyki, Dzyatlava District, a village in Dzyatlava District, Grodno Region
- Buyki, Minsk Region, a village in Myadzyel District, Minsk Region
- Buyki, Vitebsk Region, a village in Sharkawshchyna District, Vitebsk Region
