= Girl Guides Association of Cyprus =

- Σώμα Κυπρίων Οδηγών
- Country: Cyprus
- Founded: 1960
- Membership: 2,763 (2006)
- Affiliation: World Association of Girl Guides and Girl Scouts

The Girl Guides Association of Cyprus (GGAC, Greek: Σώμα Κυπρίων Οδηγών, ΣΚΟ) is the national Guiding association of Cyprus. Guiding in Cyprus started in 1912 and became a member of the World Association of Girl Guides and Girl Scouts (WAGGGS) in 1962. The coeducational organization has 2,763 members (as of 2006).

== History ==
Although there were Lone Guides in the years following 1912, the first functioning units were formed in 1930 as an overseas branch of the British Guide Association. In 1960, after the independence of Cyprus, the Girl Guides Association of Cyprus was established.

In 1962, the new association was admitted to WAGGGS as an associate member. It became a full member in 1978.

The association hosted the 6th European Scout and Guide Conference in 1989, cooperating with the Cyprus Scouts Association.

The Cypriot Guides have an active partnership with the Association of Belarusian Guides. They trained Belarusian leaders prior to its admission to WAGGGS in 1996 and are still supporting the development of the Belarusian Guides.

== Program and ideals ==
The association is divided in five age-groups:

- Chrysalis (ages 5 to 6)
- Butterflies (ages 7 to 9)
- Guides (ages 10 to 12)
- Sea Guides, Air Guides, Forest Guides (ages 13 to 15)
- Senior Guides, Prospective Leaders (ages 16 to 18)

The Girl Guide emblem incorporates elements of the earlier flag of Cyprus. The copper color represents the mineral wealth for which the island is named, the K is the first letter of the name of the country in both Greek and Turkish.
