= Cross of Lorraine =

Christian and French patriotic symbol

Several variants of the Cross of Lorraine (or Patriarchal cross)

The Cross of Lorraine (French: croix de Lorraine), known as the Cross of Anjou in the 16th century, is a heraldic two-barred cross, consisting of a vertical line crossed by two shorter horizontal bars. In most renditions, the horizontal bars are "graded" with the upper bar being the shorter, though variations with the bars of equal length are also seen. The Lorraine name has come to signify several cross variations, including the Patriarchal cross with its bars near the top. The Cross of Lorraine came to the Duchy of Lorraine via the Kingdom of Hungary in the 15th century. Similar two-barred cross symbols prominently feature in heraldry from Poland, Lithuania and Belarus. Its ultimate origins are from the crozier of an Archbishop. The Cross of Lorraine was used as a symbol of Free France during World War II and was earlier used by French patriots to signify desire to reclaim provinces lost to Germany in the Franco-Prussian War.

== Design ==
The Cross of Lorraine consists of one vertical and two horizontal bars. In most renditions, the horizontal bars are "graded" with the upper bar being the shorter, though variations with the bars of equal length are also seen.

== History ==
The Cross of Lorraine came from the Kingdom of Hungary to the Duchy of Lorraine. In Hungary, Béla III was the first monarch to use the two-barred cross as the symbol of royal power in the late 12th century. He probably adopted it from the Byzantine Empire, according to historian Pál Engel. René II, Duke of Lorraine inherited the two-barred cross as a symbol from his distant ancestors from the House of Anjou of Hungary, which had inherited it as kings of Hungary from the country's first ruling dynasty, the Árpáds. René's grandfather, René the Good, who used it as his personal sigil, laid claim to four kingdoms, including Hungary. The cross was still known as the "Cross of Anjou" in the 16th century. René II placed the symbol on his flag before the Battle of Nancy in January 1477. In the battle, René defeated the army of Charles the Bold, Duke of Burgundy, who had occupied the Duchy of Lorraine, and regained his duchy. All coins struck for René bore the symbol thereafter.

The "Free French Forces" resistance flag and naval jack are symbols of Gaullism.

== Symbol of France ==
The flag of Free France is the standard flag of France superimposed with the Lorraine cross.

The Cross of Lorraine is an emblem of Lorraine in eastern France. Between 1871 and 1918 (and again between 1940 and 1944), the north-eastern quarter of Lorraine (the Moselle department) was annexed to Germany, along with Alsace. During that period the Cross served as a rallying point for French ambitions to recover its lost provinces. This historical significance lent it considerable weight as a symbol of French patriotism. During World War II, Capitaine de corvette Thierry d'Argenlieu suggested the Cross of Lorraine as the symbol of the Free French Forces led by Charles de Gaulle as an answer to the Nazi swastika.

In France, the Cross of Lorraine was the symbol of Free France during World War II, the liberation of France from Nazi Germany and Vichy France along with the allies the United Kingdom and the United States, and Gaullism and includes several variations of a two-barred cross.

The Cross was displayed on the flags of Free French warships, and the fuselages of Free French aircraft. The medal of the Order of Liberation bears the Cross of Lorraine.

De Gaulle himself is memorialised by a 43-metre (141 ft) high Cross of Lorraine in his home village of Colombey-les-Deux-Églises. The Cross of Lorraine was later adopted by Gaullist political groups such as the Rally for the Republic.

=== New World ===
French Jesuit missionaries and settlers to the New World carried the Cross of Lorraine c. 1750–1810. The symbol was said to have helped the missionaries to convert the native peoples they encountered, because the two-armed cross resembled existing local imagery.

== European heraldry ==
The coat of arms of Hungary depicts a double cross, which is often attributed to Byzantine influence as King Béla III of Hungary was raised in the Byzantine Empire in the 12th century, and it was during his rule when the double cross became a symbol of Hungary. Also the 'dual cross' is the consonant 'gy' in ancient Hungarian runic writing which reads "egy" (one) when it stands alone mostly, if not always, with "God" meaning.

A golden double cross with equal bars, known as the Cross of Jagiellons, was used by Grand Duke of Lithuania and King of Poland Jogaila since his conversion to Christianity in 1386, as a personal insignia and was introduced in the coat of arms of Lithuania. Initially, the lower bar of the cross was longer than the upper, since it originates from the Hungarian type of the double cross. It later became the symbol of Jagiellonian dynasty and is one of the national symbols of Lithuania, featured in the Order of the Cross of Vytis and the badge of the Lithuanian Air Force.

The double-barred cross is one of the national symbols in Belarus, both as the Jagiellon Cross and as the Cross of St. Euphrosyne of Polatsk, an important religious artifact. The symbol is supposed to have Byzantine roots and is used by the Belarusian Greek Catholic Church as a symbol uniting Eastern-Byzantine and Western-Latin church traditions. The Belarusian Cross can be found on the traditional coat of arms of Belarus, the Pahonia.

Silver double cross, on a mountain with three peaks, forms the coat of arms of the Slovak Republic.

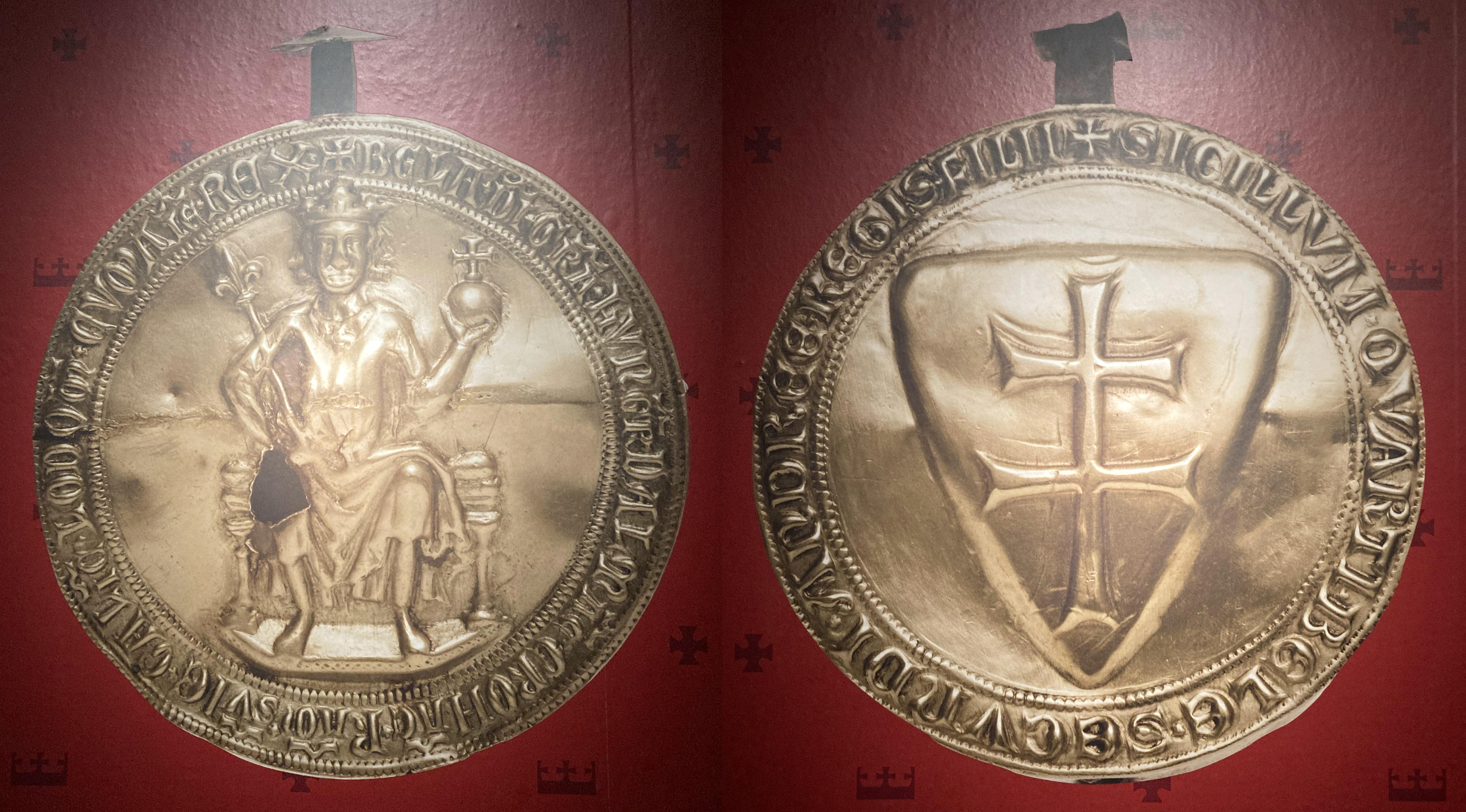
The seal of King Béla IV of Hungary (1235–1270) from his Golden Bull

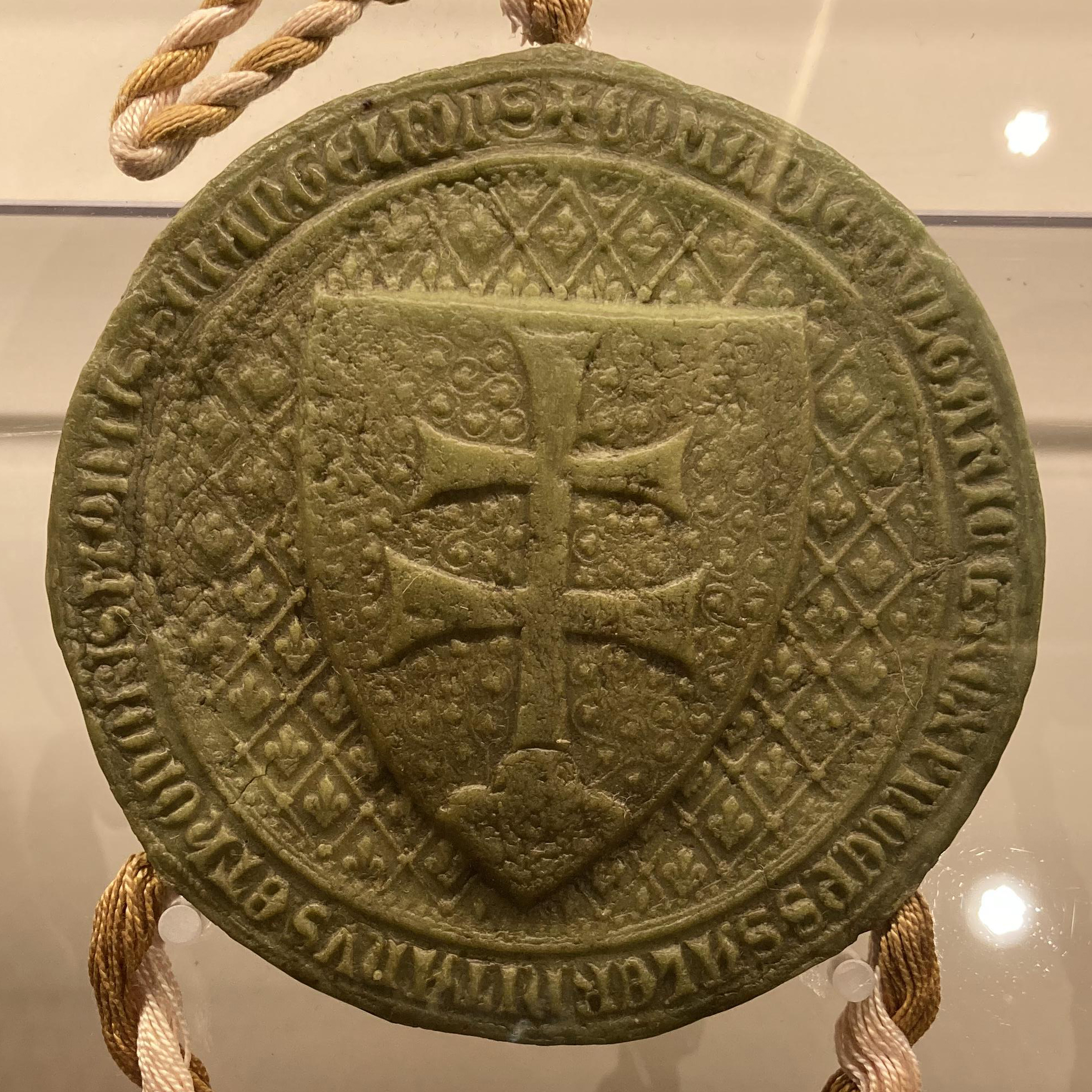
Reverse of the second double seal (1366–1382) of King Louis I of Hungary (1342–1382).

The coat of arms of Lithuania

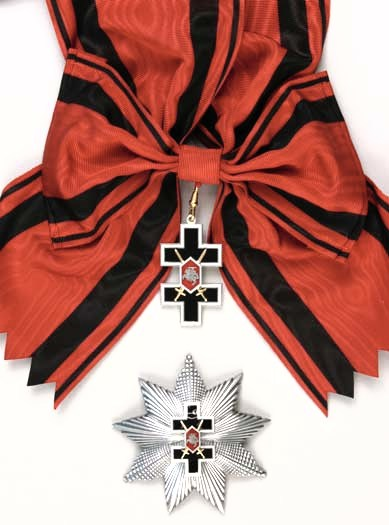
Order of the Cross of Vytis, a Lithuanian presidential award

Hungarian arms, depicting the cross on the sinister side.

Coat of arms of Slovakia

Flag of Slovakia

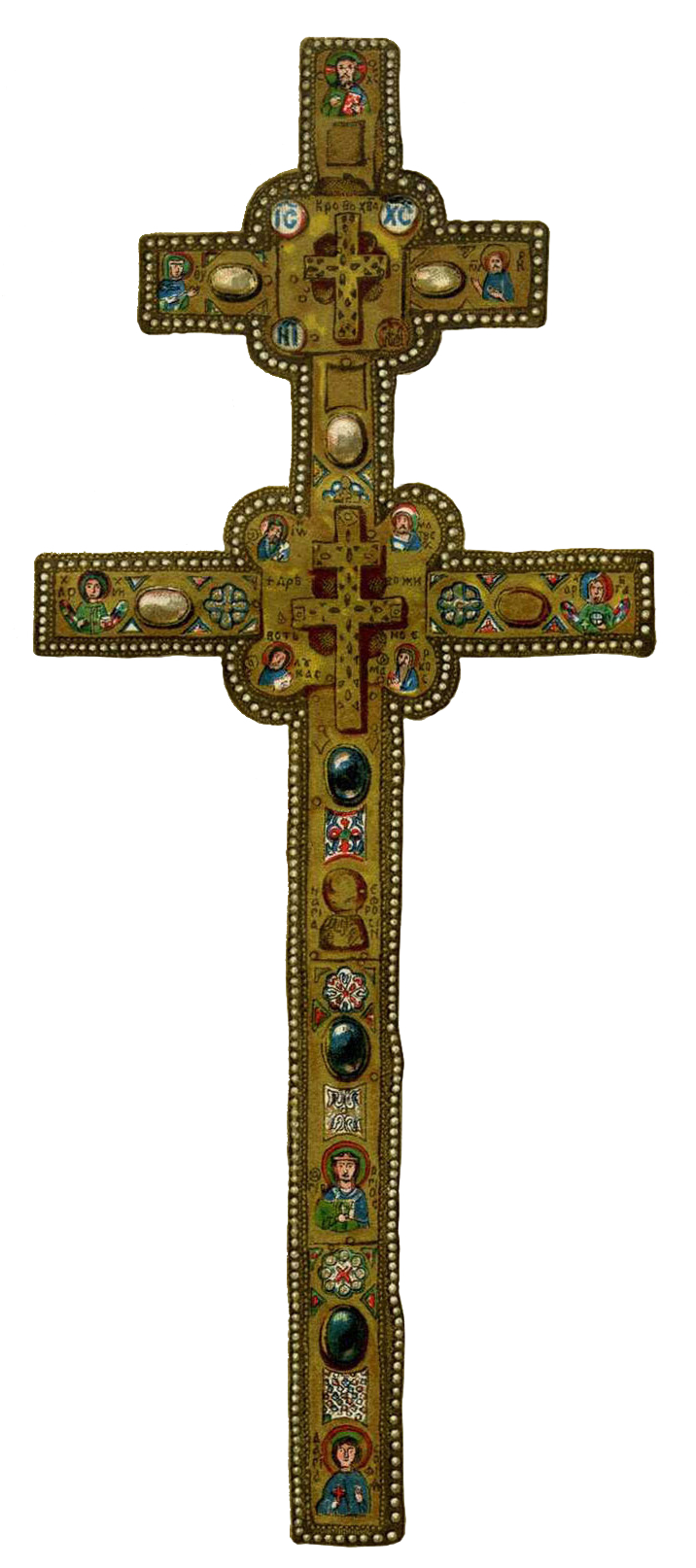
The Cross of Saint Euphrosyne

Coat of arms of Belarus, 1991–1995

== Typography ==
The "Cross of Lorraine" symbol appears in Unicode as U+2628 ☨ CROSS OF LORRAINE. (Not to be confused with U+2021 ‡ DOUBLE DAGGER (&Dagger;, &ddagger;)).

The cross of Lorraine was previously used in the Sabre, Apollo, and Worldspan global distribution systems (GDS) as a delimiter in various input formats, however, the latest version of the graphical user interface for each system uses a different symbol: Apollo displays it as a plus sign, Worldspan as a number sign, and Sabre as a yen symbol.

== Miscellaneous appearances ==
For its defense of France in World War I, the American 79th Infantry Division was nicknamed the "Cross of Lorraine" Division; its insignia is the cross. The German 79th Infantry Division of World War II used the cross of Lorraine as its insignia because its first attack was in the Lorraine region. The insignia was redesignated effective December 1, 2009, for the 79th US Army Reserve Sustainment Support Command in Los Alamitos, California. The Lorraine cross is also used by the 1st and 2nd Battalions, 325th Airborne Infantry Regiment, 82nd Airborne Division on their distinguished unit insignia.

The cross is used as an emblem by the American Lung Association and related organizations through the world, and as such is familiar from their Christmas seals program. Its use was suggested in 1902 by Paris physician Gilbert Sersiron as a symbol for the "crusade" against tuberculosis.

It is a standard pattern for horse racing colours in the UK.

The metal band President uses the Cross of Lorraine as their logotype.

The Scottish indie-rock band Frightened Rabbit also uses the cross as a recurring motif in their artwork and album covers.

== Gallery ==
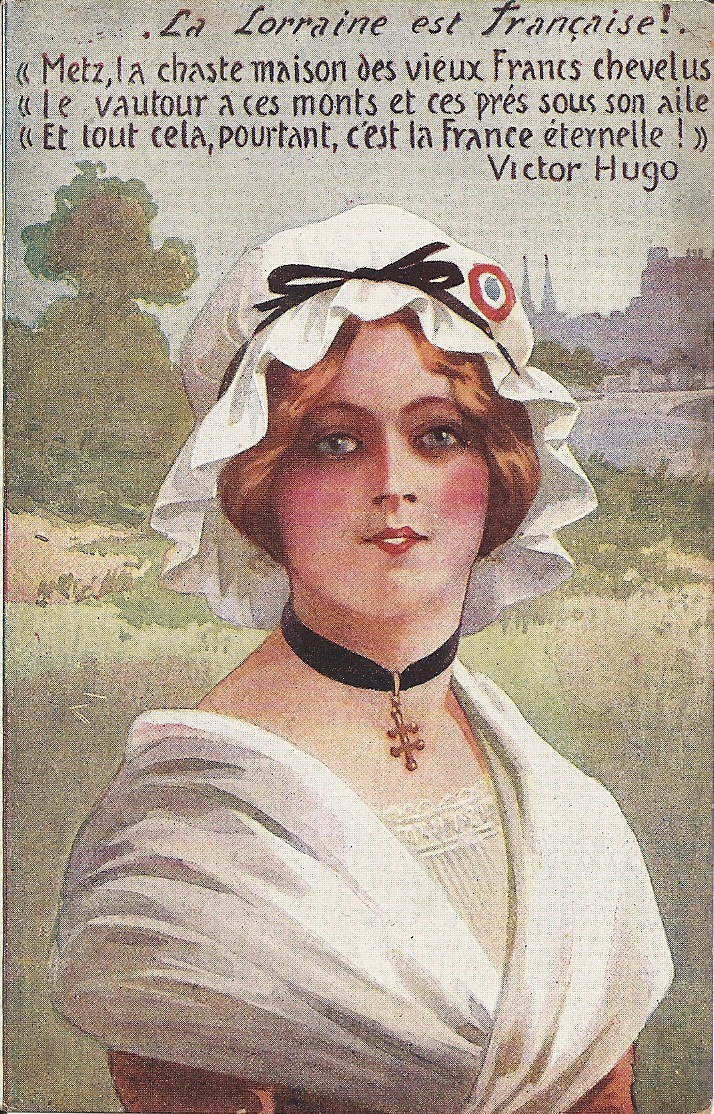
"La Lorraine est française!" Propaganda image advocating the return of Alsace–Lorraine to France

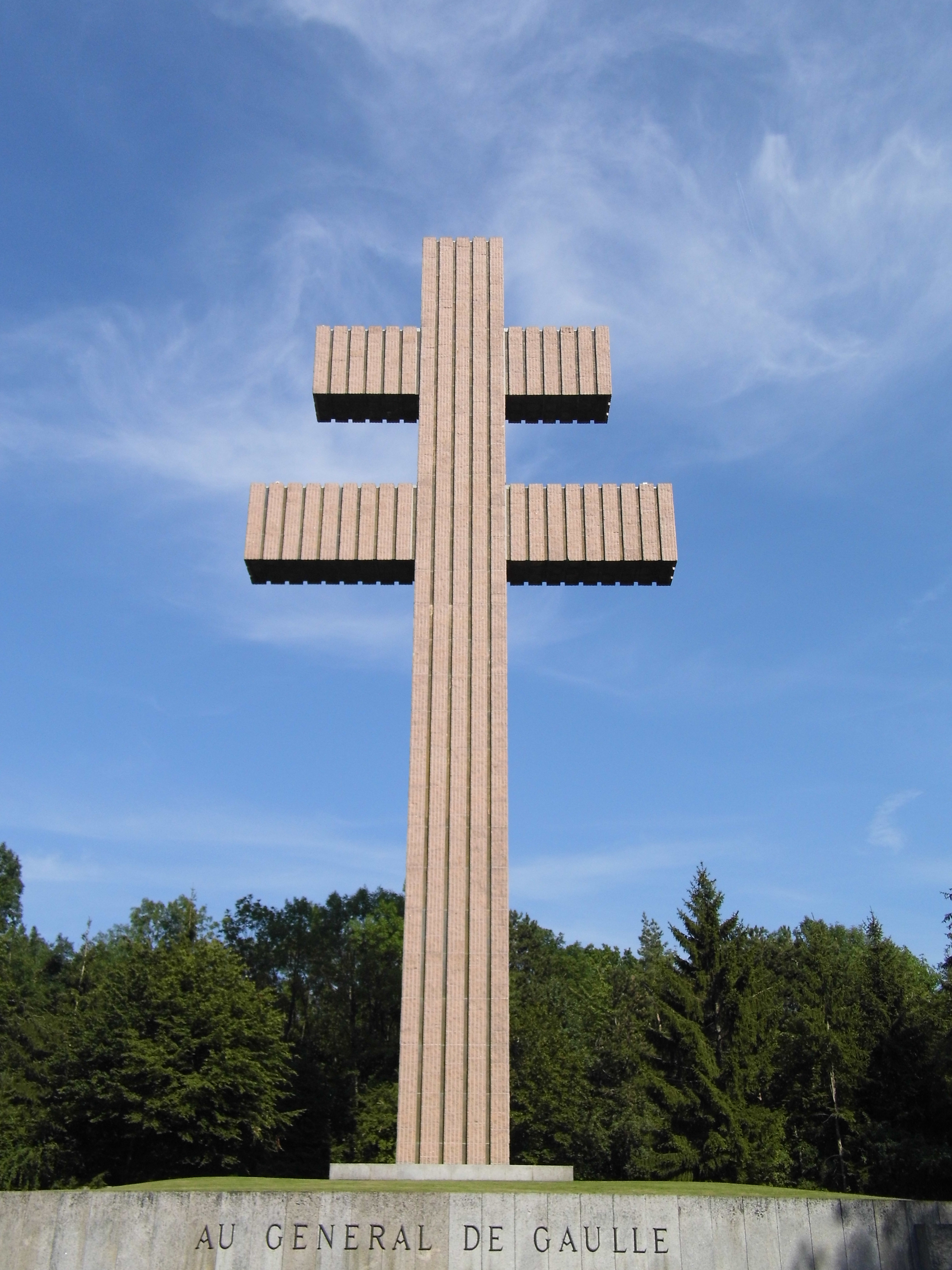
Monument to Charles de Gaulle in Colombey-les-Deux-Églises

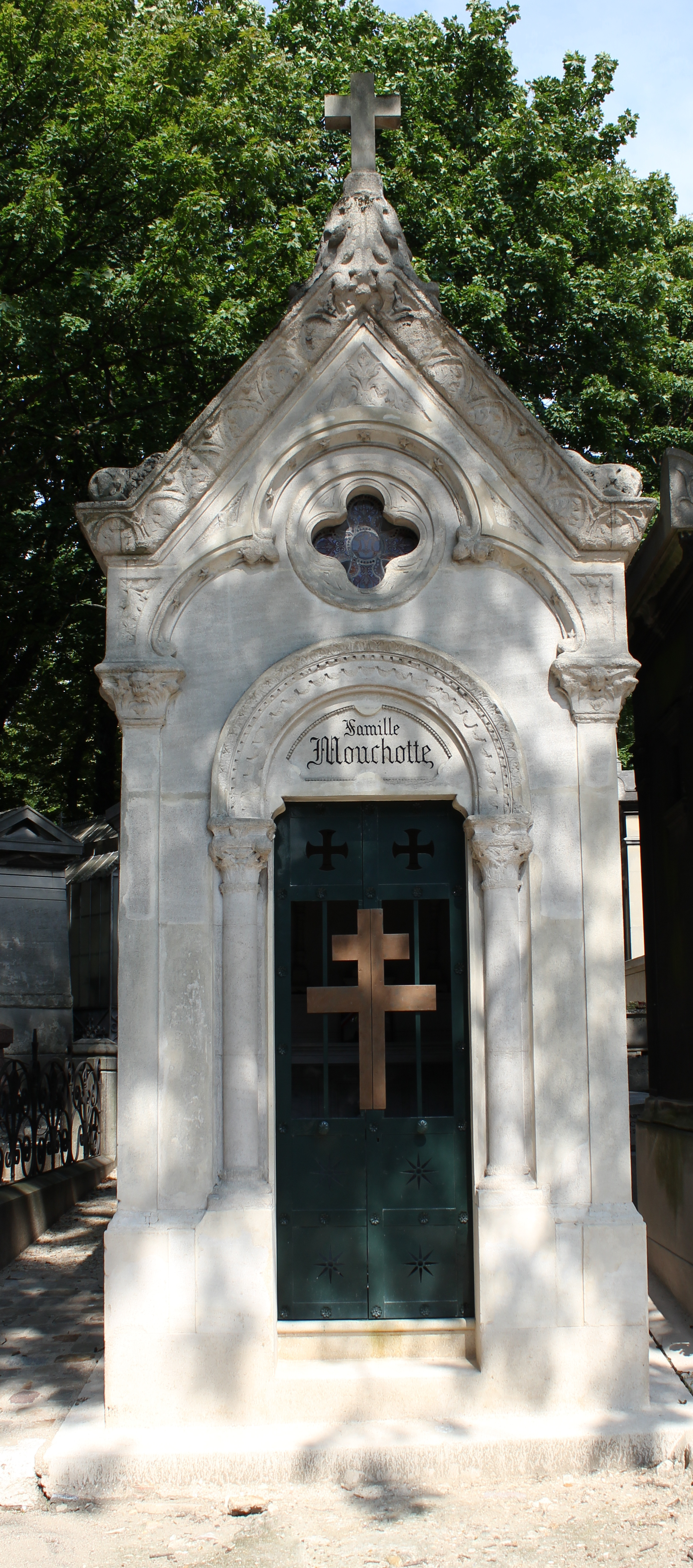
Tomb of fighter pilot René Mouchotte at Père Lachaise Cemetery

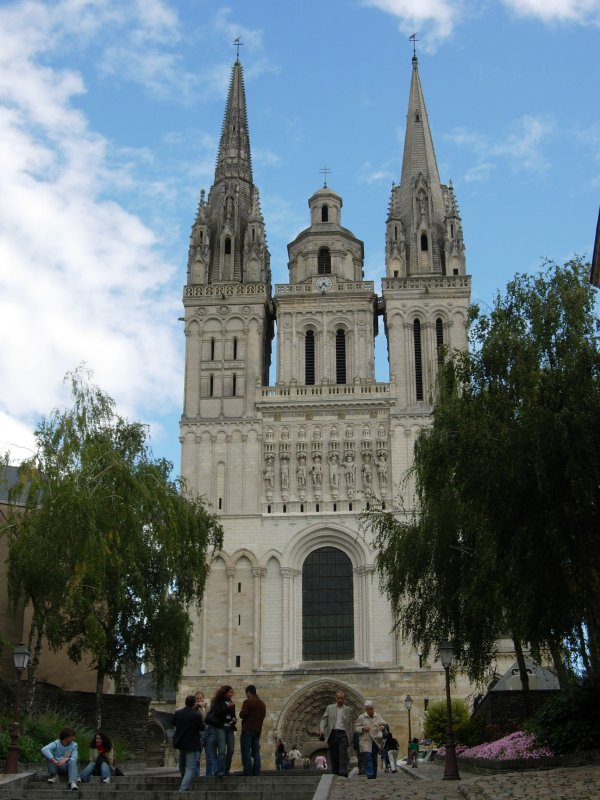
The cross of Lorraine atop Saint Maurice Cathedral in Angers, Maine-et-Loire, France,

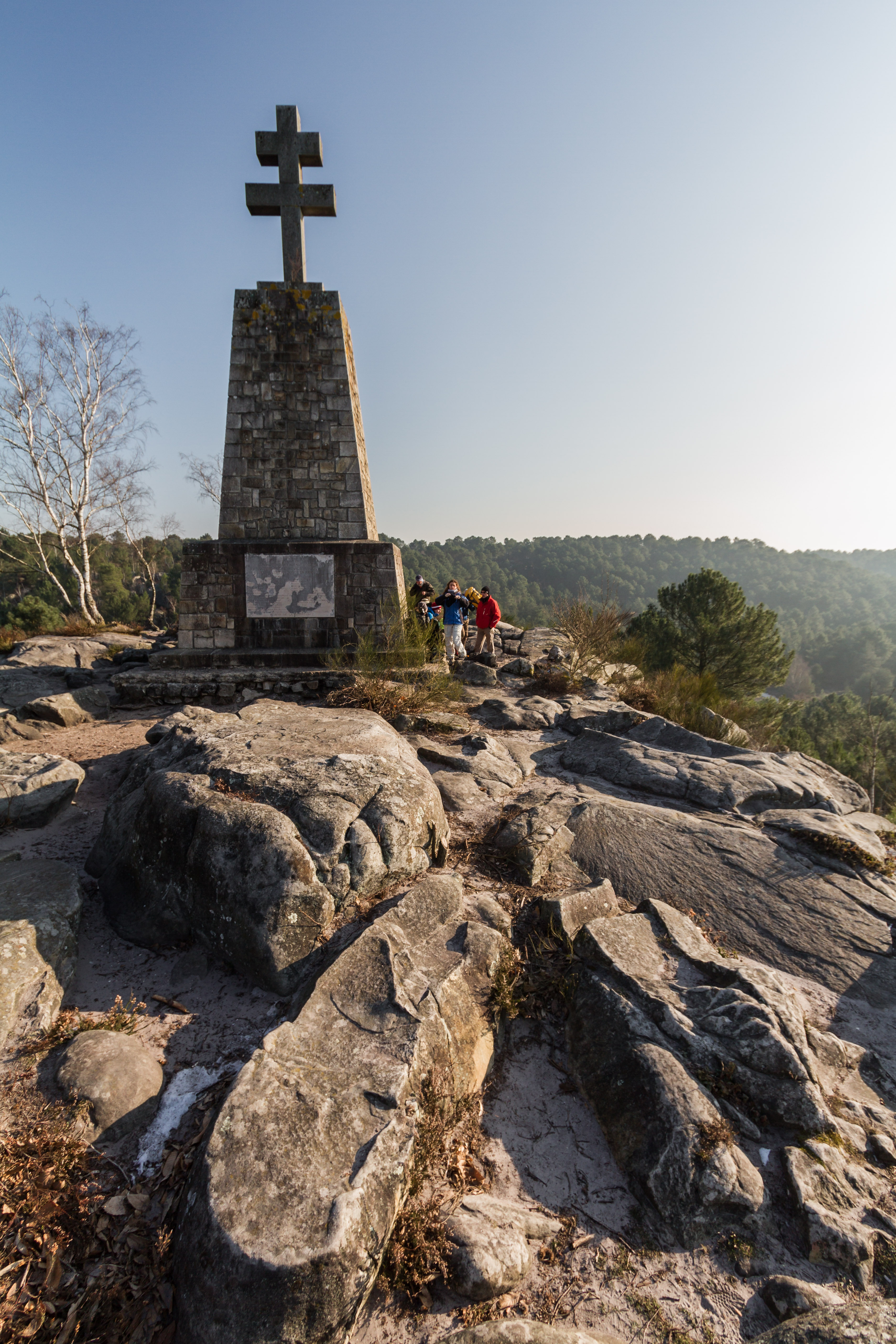
Monument to the French Resistance, in the Forest of Three Pines, Fontainebleau, Seine-et-Marne

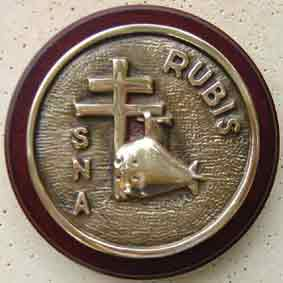
The tampion of the Rubis features the Cross of Lorraine in honour of the Free French submarine Rubis.

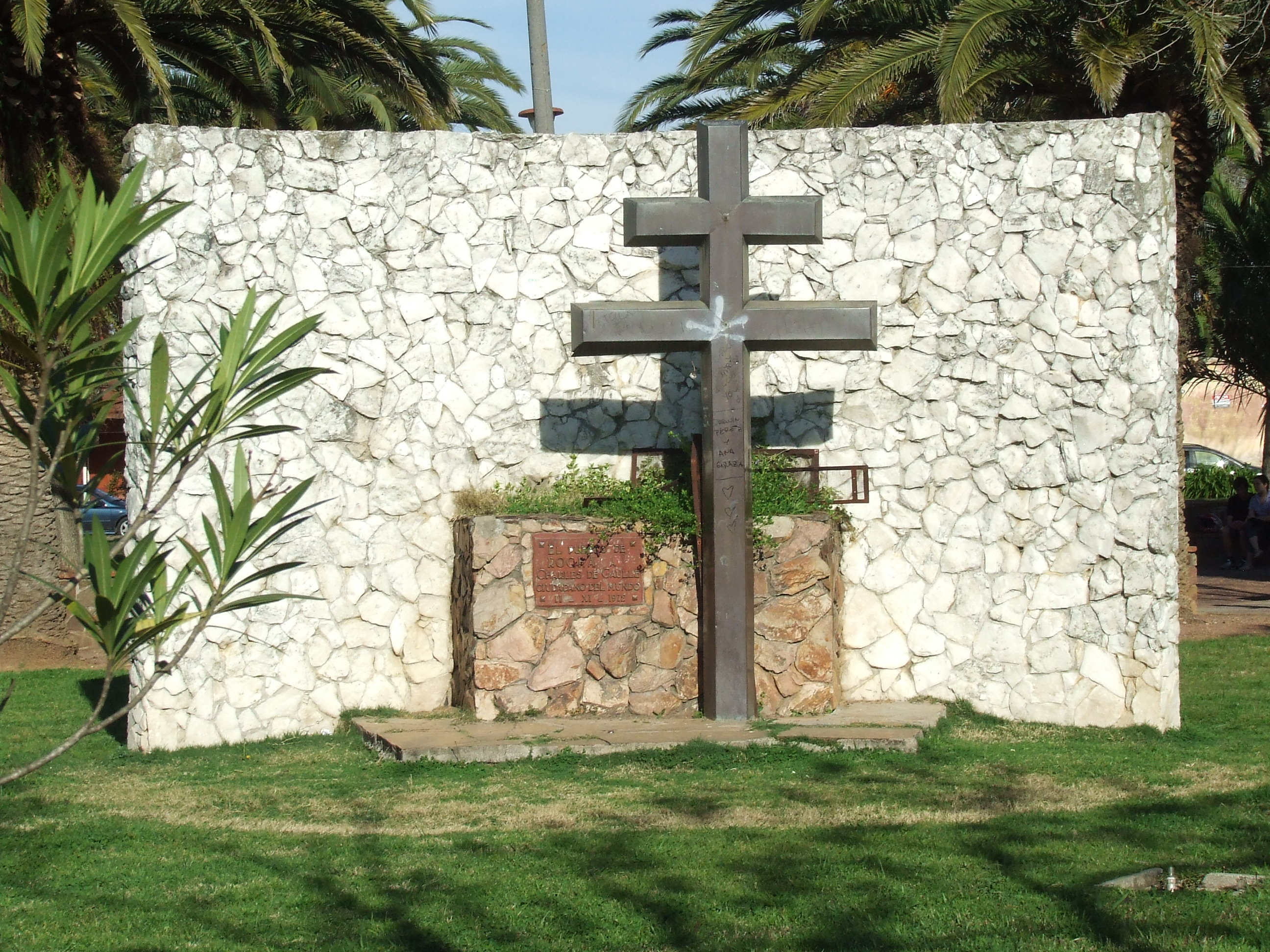
Monument to De Gaulle in Rocha, Uruguay

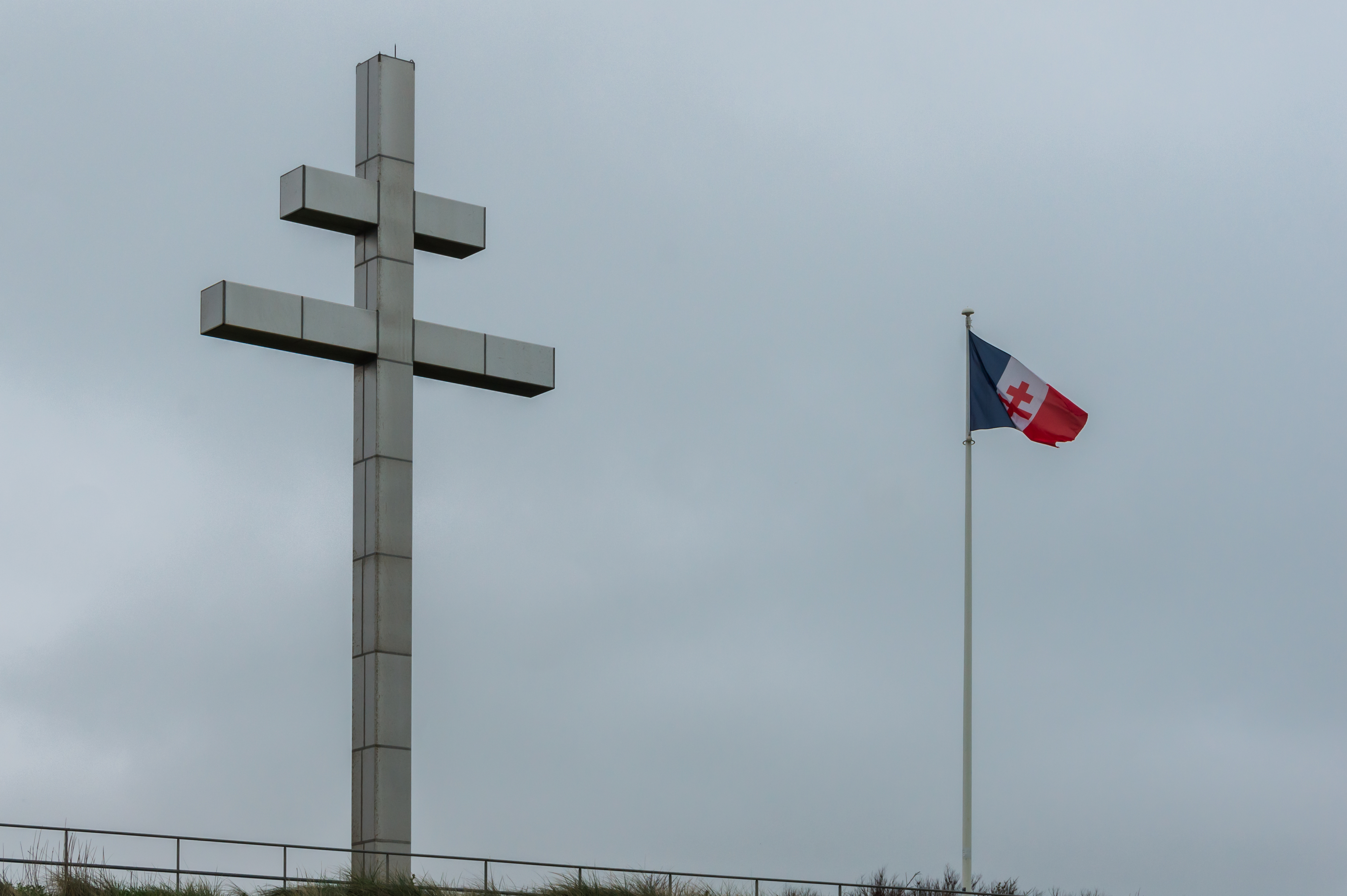
Cross of Lorraine and Free French flag, Courseulles-sur-Mer, Calvados, Normandy, where De Gaulle landed on 14 June 1944.

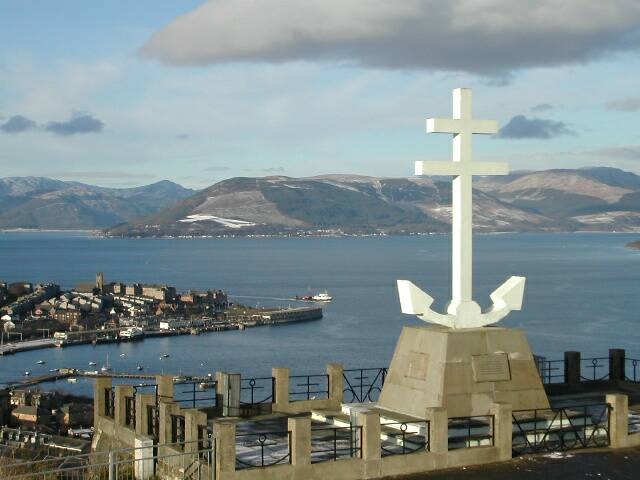
Free French Memorial, Lyle Hill, Greenock, Inverclyde, Scotland, United Kingdom

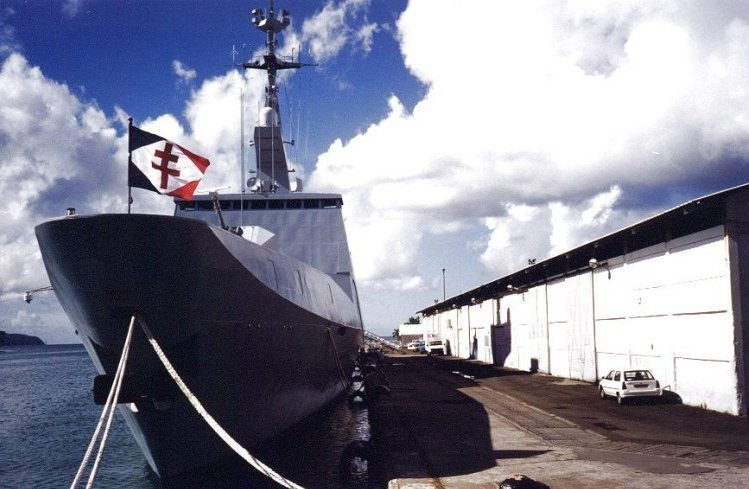
French frigate Aconit, named after the corvette Aconit of the Free French Navy, with Free French naval jack

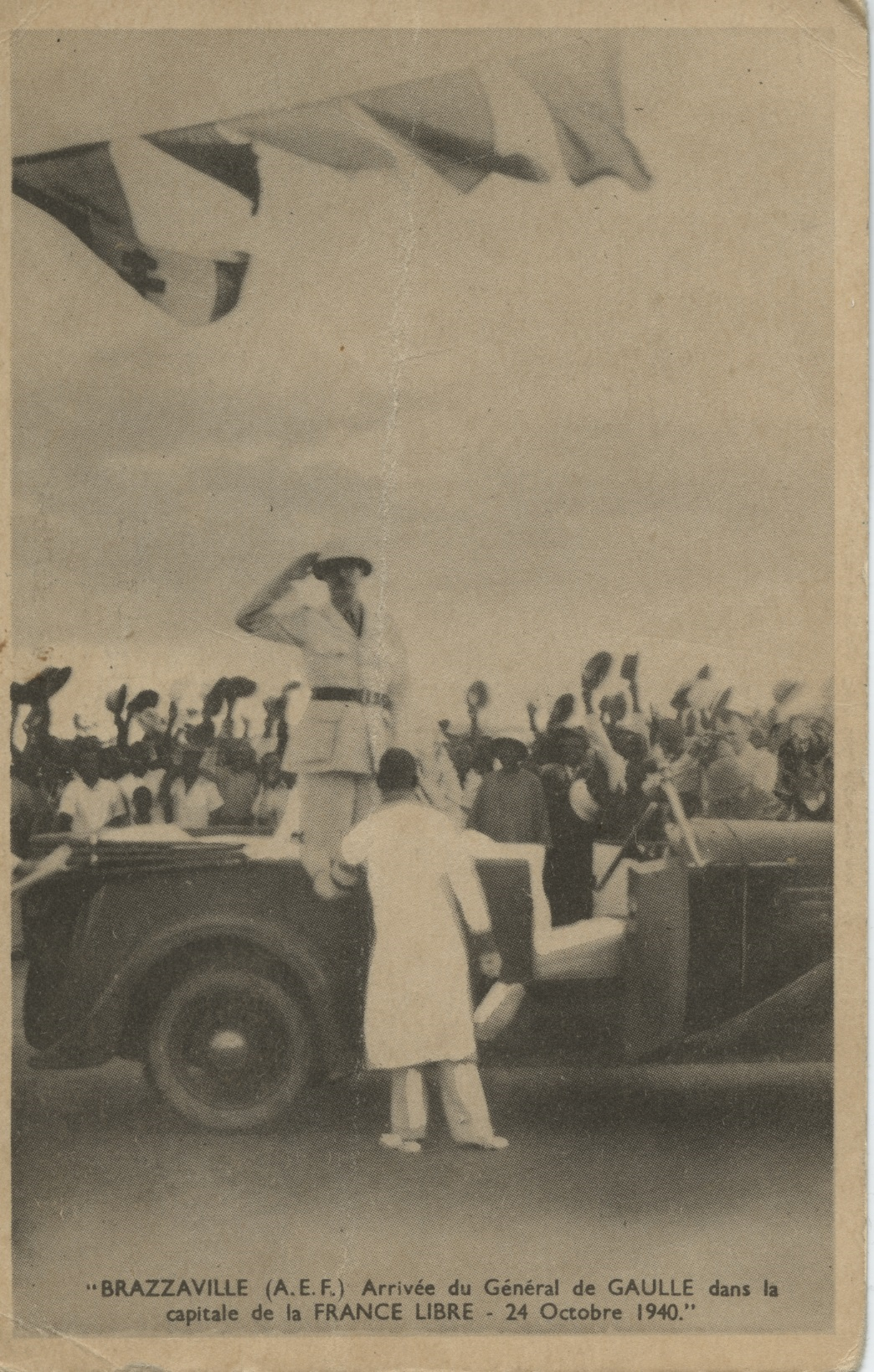
Free French flag at Brazzaville, the capital of Free France and Free French Africa, 24 October 1940

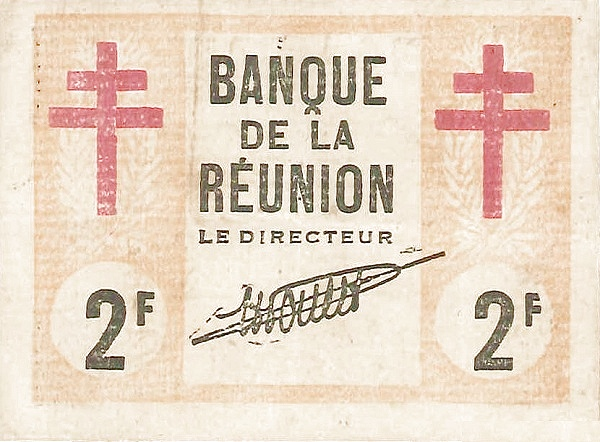
2 franc note issued by the Banque de la Réunion, 1943

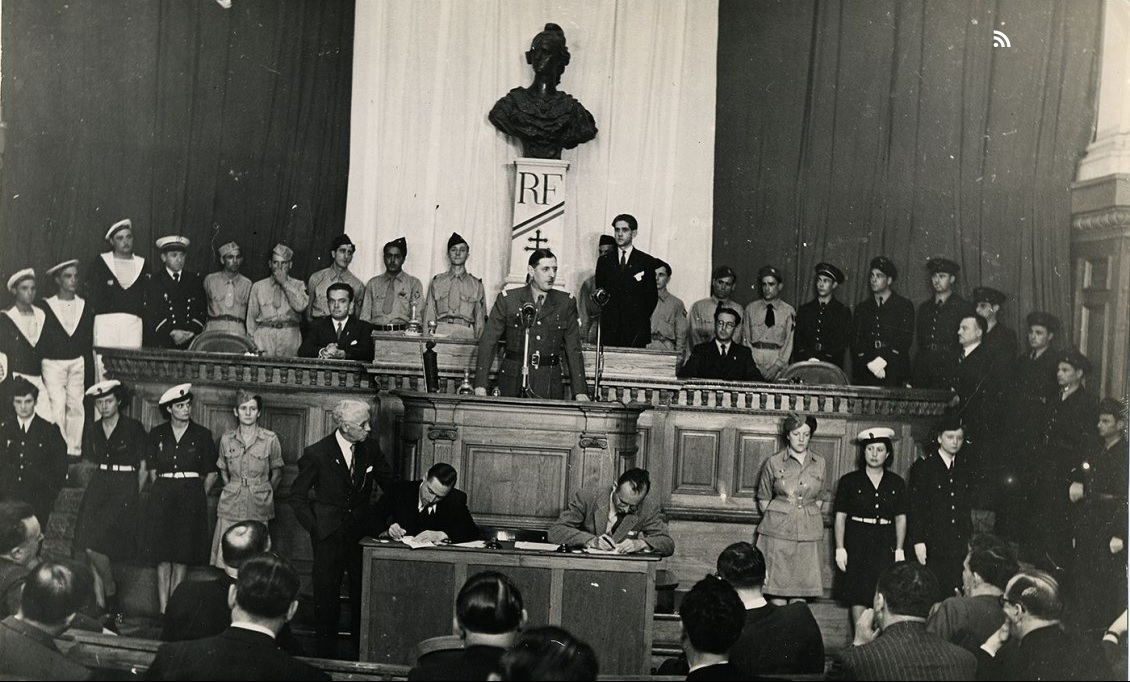
Cross of Lorraine at the Provisional Consultative Assembly in Algiers, Free France, November 1943

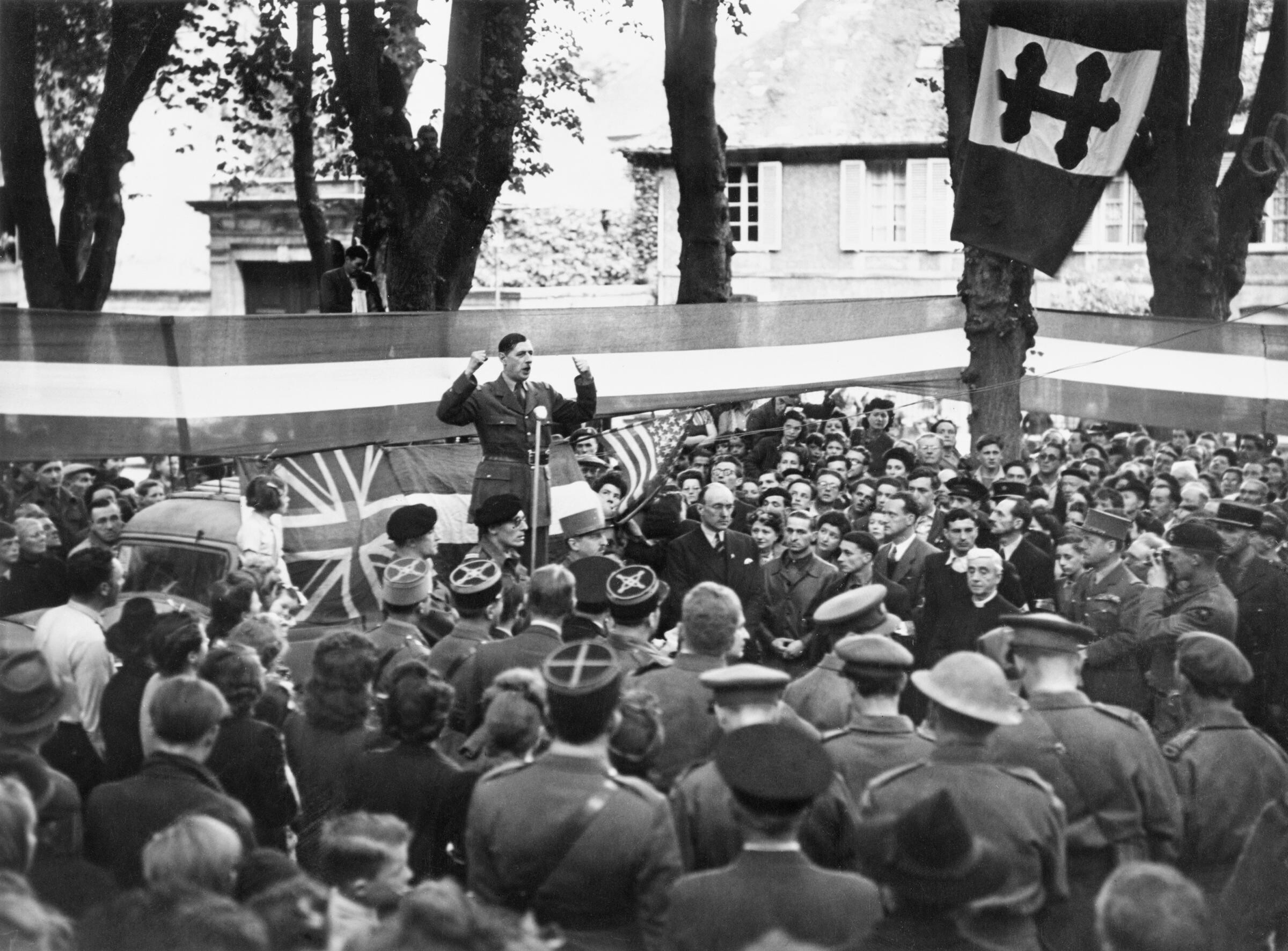
Free French flag at the First Bayeux speech in Bayeux, Normandy, 14 June 1944

== See also ==
- Coat of arms of Hungary
- Coat of arms of Lithuania
- Coat of arms of Slovakia
- Flag of Slovakia
- Free French Forces, who used the Cross of Lorraine as their symbol.
- Hertensteiner Cross, a symbol of two merged "E"-letters, "E" standing for European federalisation
- Kotwica, the symbol of the Polish Underground State
- Patriarchal cross
- Russian Orthodox cross

== Sources ==
- Carroll, Stuart (2009). Martyrs and Murderers: The Guise Family and the Making of Europe. Oxford University Press. ISBN 978-0-19-922907-9.
- Engel, Pál (2001). The Realm of St Stephen: A History of Medieval Hungary, 895–1526. I.B. Tauris Publishers. ISBN 1-86064-061-3.
- McIntosh, Christopher (2005). Gardens of the Gods: Myth, Magic and Meaning in Horticulture. I.B. Tauris. ISBN 1-86064-740-5.
- Monter, William (2007). A Bewitched Duchy: Lorraine and its Dukes, 1477-1736. Librairie Droz. ISBN 978-2-600-01165-5.
