= Papal cross =

Heraldic symbol

Papal cross

A papal cross

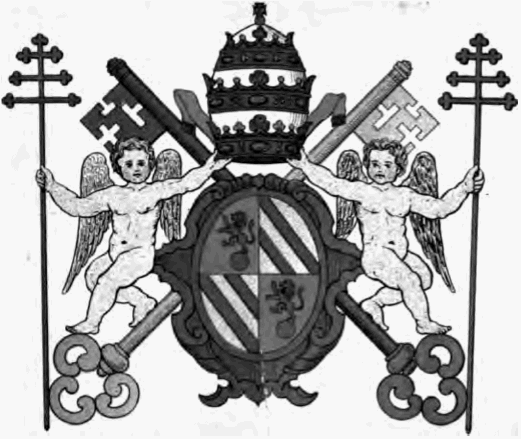
Rendition of the coat of arms of Pope Pius IX with supporters: two angels, each holding a papal cross

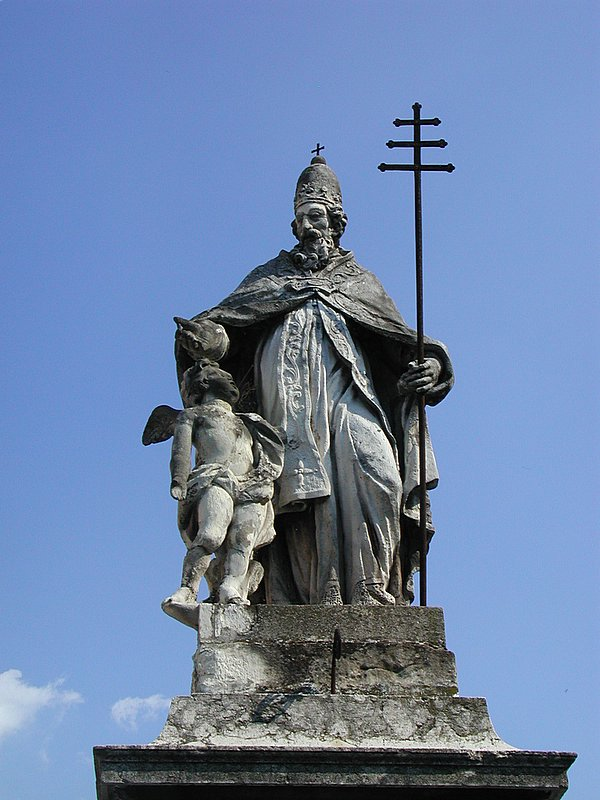
Statue of Pope Sylvester I depicted holding a ferula with a papal cross

The papal cross is a Christian cross that serves as an emblem for the office of the Pope in ecclesiastical heraldry. It is depicted as a staff with three horizontal bars near the top, in diminishing order of length as the top is approached.

== Background ==
The cross is analogous to the two-barred archiepiscopal cross used in heraldry to indicate an archbishop, and seems to have been used precisely to indicate an ecclesiastical rank still higher than that of archbishop. In the past, this design of the cross was often used in ecclesiastical heraldry as a distinctive mark of his office. It was often merely an artistic device, as use of a staff or crosier was not part of the traditional papal insignia. However, at least one staff surmounted with a papal cross does exist.

Symbolism connected with the papal powers has been attached to the three crossbars, similar to the symbolism attached to the three bands on the papal tiara.
