= Buyki, Minsk region =

Buiki Буйкі (Belarusian)
- Village
- Location within Belarus
- Coordinates: 54°46′10″N 26°36′16″E
- Country: Belarus
- Region: Minsk Region
- District: Myadzyel District

Population (2009)
  - Total: 197
  - Estimate (2012): 195
- Time zone: UTC+3 (MSK)
- Postcode: 222389
- Area code: 5

Buyki (Belarusian: Буйкі; Russian: Буйки) is a village in Myadzyel District, Minsk Region, Belarus. It is part of Zanarach selsoviet since 2013; it was previously part of Syrmyezh selsoviet.
