= Association of Belarusian Guides =

- Ассоциация белорусских гайдов
- Location: Minsk
- Country: Belarus
- Founded: 1992
- Membership: 1,274
- Affiliation: World Association of Girl Guides and Girl Scouts

The Association of Belarusian Guides (ABG, Ассоциация белорусских гайдов, Belarusian: Асацыяцыя беларускіх гайдаў, romanized: Asacyjacyja biełaruskich hajdaŭ) is the Belarusian member organization of the World Association of Girl Guides and Girl Scouts (WAGGGS), with a membership of 1,274 Girl Guides (as of 2003).

Belarusian Guiding started in 1922 in the then Polish parts of present Belarus. In 1992, after the dissolution of the Soviet Union, the restart of Guiding was supported by WAGGGS; leader training was undertaken by the Girl Guides Association of Cyprus. The association became a member of WAGGGS in 1996.

== History ==
The initial development of Scouting in Belarus took place within the Russian Scout movement, as part of the Russian Empire. A Scout organization was founded in Kletsk, and Scouts appeared in Nyasvizh and other nearby villages. In 1929, American Methodists helped found a Girl Scout organization in Vilna. It lasted until 1929, but by the end of the 1920s, Scouting had been banned by the Soviet Union, and Scout activities ended, with many leaders and members arrested and imprisoned.

Emergence of democratic principles in the mid-1980s made possible the creation of alternatives to the communist pioneer organizations. Close connections were formed with Guide and Scout organizations of many European countries, when children from areas affected by the Chernobyl accident were invited to summer camps abroad during the Chernobyl Children's Project in 1990. Especially close links were developed with Cyprus, and between Minsk and the Guides of Lincolnshire. In 1992, Cyprus was officially appointed Link country to support the development of Guiding in Belarus, and in June 1993 the first conference of the Association of Belarusian Guides was held in Minsk. There is also a close link to Pfadfinder und Pfadfinderinnen Österreichs in Austria. In 2000 a delegation of Association of Belarusian Guides took part in the Viennese International Regional Camp "Vienna 2000", in 2003 a delegation took part in the Freelife Jamboree in Upper Austria, in 2008 Guides from Belarus took part in AQUA!-The Water Jamboree also in Upper Austria and in spring 2009 a Guider from the Association of Belarusian Guides took part in the Wood Badge training course of Pfadfinder und Pfadfinderinnen Österreichs. In 2003/04 the Austrian Boy Scouts and Girl Guides supported "Mediaboom", a project on media and journalism of the Belarusian Girl Guides.

Since the nuclear accident at Chernobyl, neighboring Belarus received some of the highest levels of radiation; the results of which can still be seen in the environment and in the health of the population. Svetlana Korotkevich, International Commissioner of the Association of Belarusian Girl Guides, is working on its Chernobyl project to raise awareness of the ongoing problems resulting from the disaster and to encourage associations in other countries to welcome groups of Belarusian children in order to give them a healthy break in a "clean" environment.

== Emblem ==
The Association of Belarusian Guides' emblem features a white stork, one of Belarus' unofficial national symbols.

== See also ==
- Scouting in Belarus
- Belarusian Republican Youth Union
