= Ivatsevichy Ghetto =

Nazi ghetto in occupied Belarus

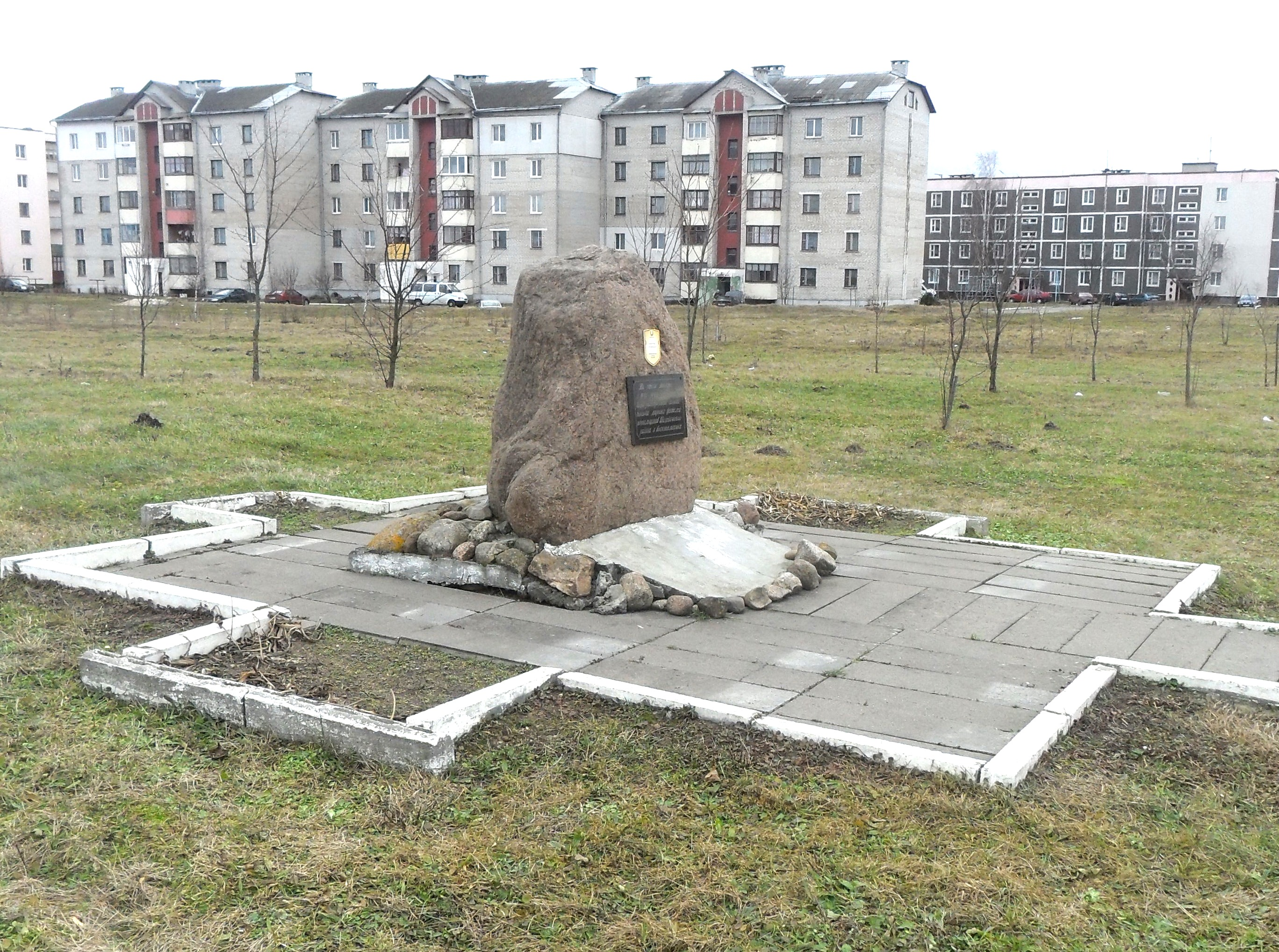
- Location: Ivatsevichy
- Date: June 24, 1941 – August 8, 1942

Ivacevichi Ghetto (June 24, 1941 – August 8, 1942) was a Jewish ghetto, a place of forced resettlement for the Jews of the town of Ivacevichi in the Brest Region and nearby settlements during the Holocaust in Belarus, under the occupation of Belarus by Nazi Germany during World War II.

== Occupation of Ivacevichi and Creation of the Ghetto ==
Before the war, the Jewish population of Ivacevichi had significantly increased due to the influx of refugees from areas of Poland occupied by the Germans in September 1939, and by the beginning of the occupation, it numbered about 300 people. Ivacevichi was captured by German forces on June 24, 1941.

Jews were immediately ordered to sew large fabric marks in the form of yellow circles onto their clothing (on the back and chest).

The Germans confiscated all the savings, household items, and tools from the Jews—equipment, sewing machines, horses, wagons, bicycles, and other property.

Shortly after the occupation, the Germans, implementing the Nazi program of exterminating Jews, organized a ghetto in Ivacevichi, where Jews from nearby villages were also brought.

== Conditions in the Ghetto ==
The ghetto was overcrowded and located in three separate areas including a small hotel on a street leading to the railway station, which ran parallel to the central street of Ivacevichi. The ghetto area was not surrounded by barbed wire.

Prisoners were beaten daily and used for forced labor—construction, road laying, and loading and unloading work at the railway station. The food ration issued was minimal—200 grams of bread per day. According to eyewitness accounts, local peasants came to the ghetto and urged: "Give us everything, you will be killed anyway..." The blacksmiths, Aron Zuchowicki (Sara Rosjanski's brother) and his brother in-law Chaim Utschtein worked repairing German trucks and for local farmers in exchange for supplemental food.

== Liquidation of the Ghetto ==
In March 1942, in severe frost and snowstorm, the Jews from the Ivacevichi ghetto were marched and taken by sleds to the forest near Kossovo—20 kilometers from Ivacevichi. All those who could not keep up were killed on the spot. People fell from exhaustion, suffered frostbite on their hands and feet, but they could not be accommodated in the Kossovo Ghetto. After two days, the Jews were allowed to move on from the forest but could not return to Ivatsevichi. On the way, 21 Jews died or were killed. Sara Rosjanski (Ross) and most of the family were taken to Byten by sled where they had relatives. In March 1942, 620 Jews from Ivacevichi were shot.

In the spring of 1942 the Germans allowed some of the younger Jews to return to Ivatsevichi from Byten to work in the sawmill. Shortly 200 Jews again were in two separate Ghetto locations including the small hotel in Ivatsevichi. In August 1942, the Germans ordered the Jews to collect and hand over all their gold, even forcing them to remove gold dental crowns.

A 10 by 5 meter pit was prepared outside the village. The "Action" (a euphemism the Germans preferred to use for their organized mass murders) took place early in the morning of August 8, 1942. The Jews, stripped naked, were lined up at the edge of the pit and shot. The killings were carried out by Lithuanian volunteers from an SS punitive battalion and Ukrainian police. After the shooting, the Germans and policemen divided the clothing and personal belongings of the victims among themselves.

Sara and Jacob Rosjanski (Ross) with their young infant son Samuel and Aron Zuchowicki (Sara's brother) were among a handful of Jews that escaped, August 8, 1942, to the dense Volcha Nory Forest near Byten. Sara and Jacob Rosjanski and Aron Zuchowicki survived and fought as Jewish Partisans in the Ponomarenko brigade until they were liberated by the Red Army on July 12, 1944.

== Memory ==
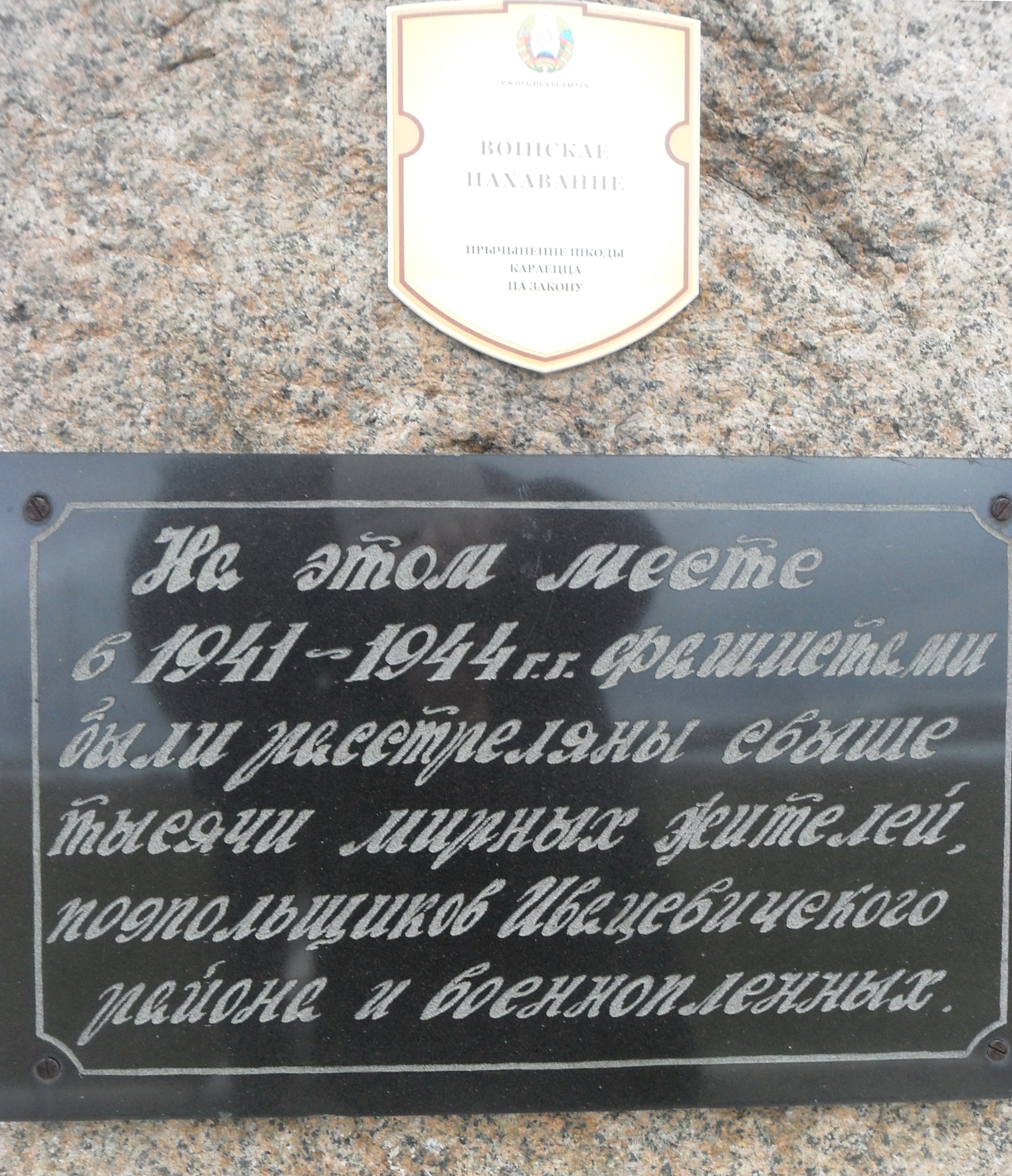
Inscription on the memorial boulder

In 2001, a memorial boulder was installed at one of the sites where more than 1,000 Jews of Ivacevichi were murdered.
