= Myerachowshchyna =

Former manor in Brest Region, Belarus

Myerachowshchyna Мерачоўшчына
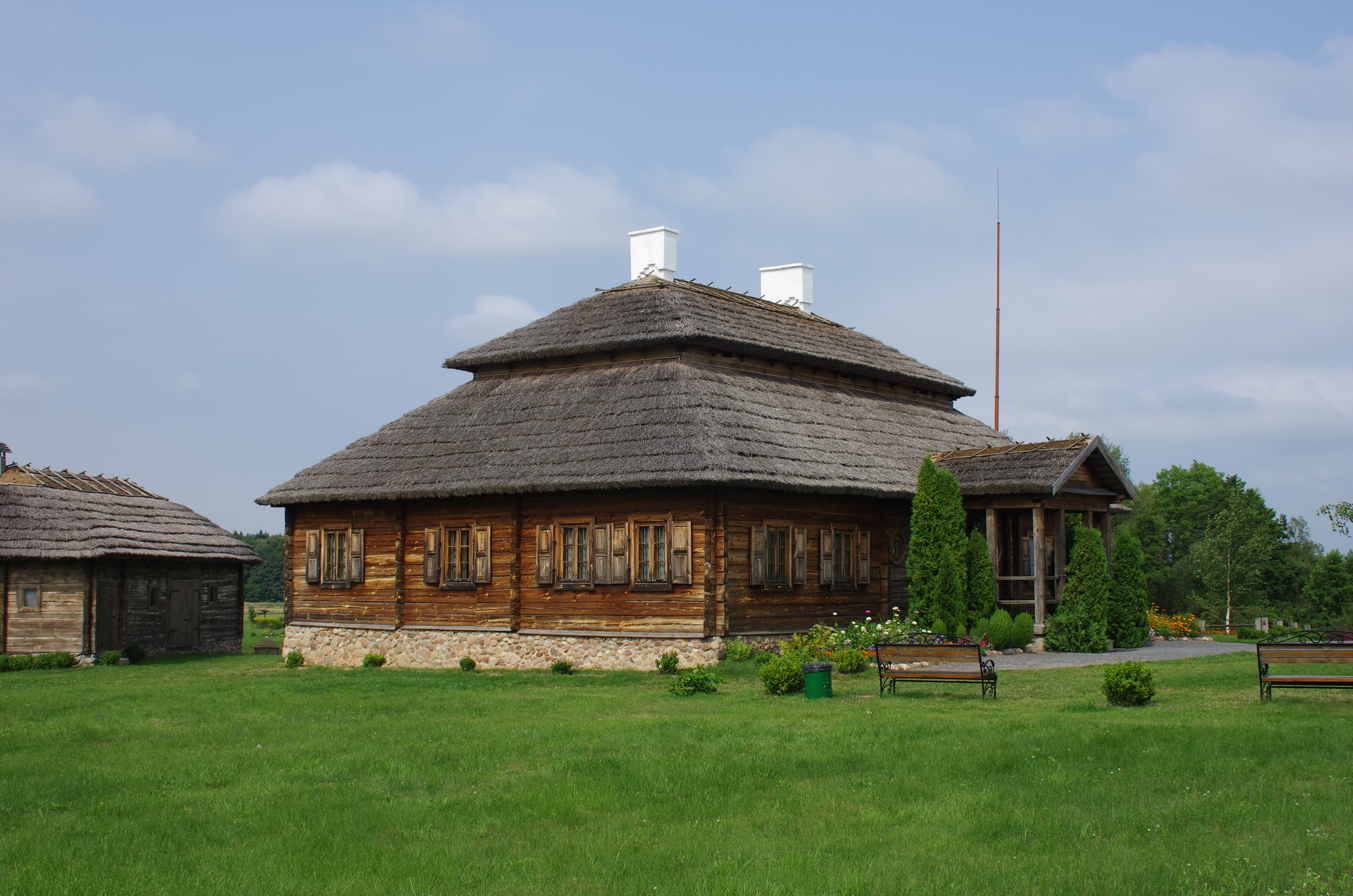
- Tadeusz Kościuszko's House

- Location within Belarus
- Coordinates: 52°46′3″N 25°07′30″E
- Country: Belarus
- Region: Brest Region
- District: Ivatsevichy District
- Time zone: UTC+3 (MSK)

Myerachowshchyna (Belarusian: Мерачоўшчына, romanized: Mieračoŭščyna; Russian: Меречёвщина, romanized: Merechyovshchina; Polish: Mereczowszczyzna) is a former manor near Kosava in Ivatsevichy District, Brest Region, in western Belarus. It is best known as the birthplace of Tadeusz Kościuszko. There is a Kościuszko museum in the reconstructed manor house of his birth.

== History ==
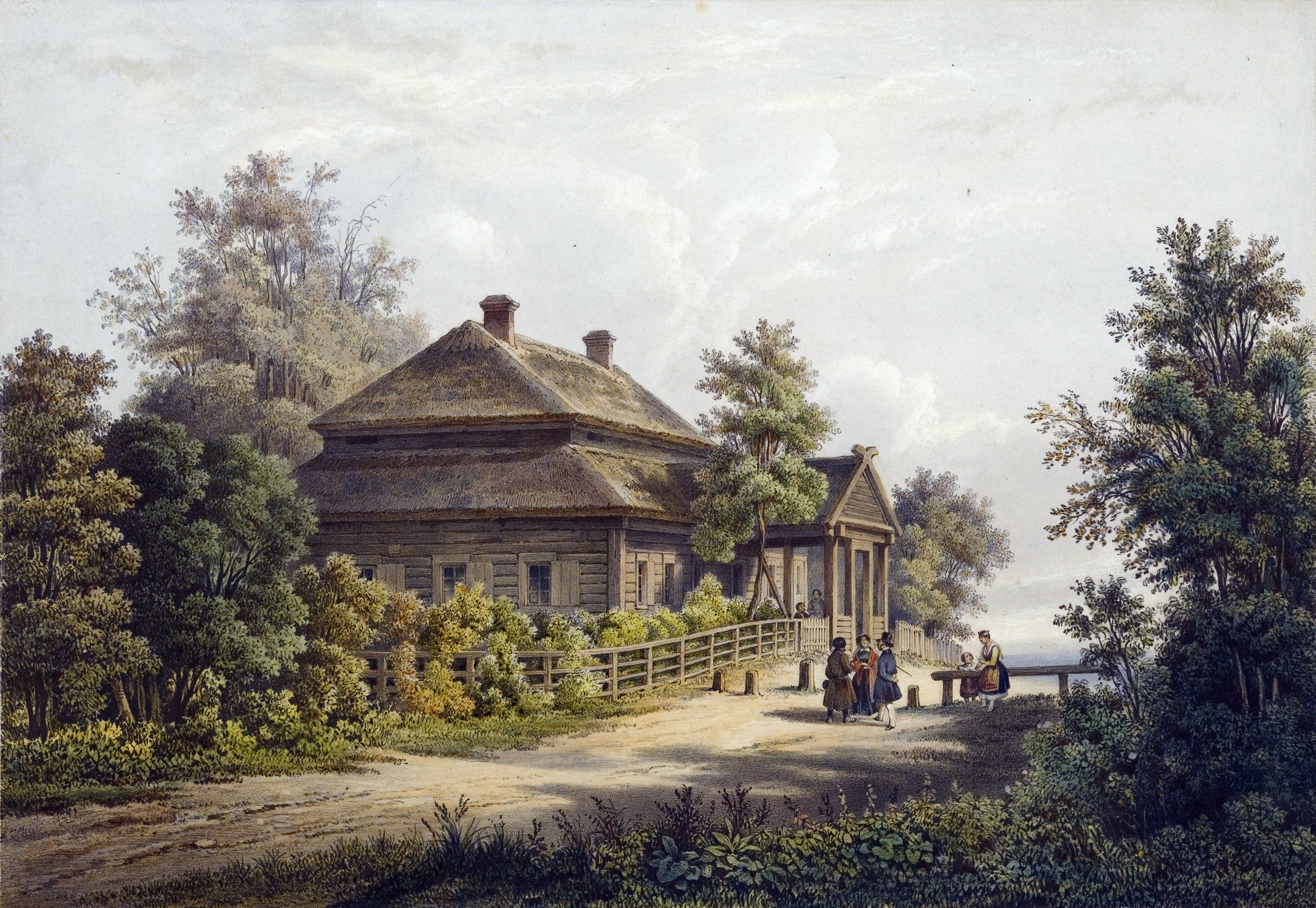
Kościuszko's birthplace in the mid-19th-century (by Alphonse Bichebois)

In the first half of the 18th century, the folwark of Mereczowszczyzna belonged to the Sapieha family, and until the Partitions of Poland, was administratively located in the Brest Litovsk Voivodeship in the Grand Duchy of Lithuania within the Polish–Lithuanian Commonwealth. In 1733, the village became property of Ludwik Tadeusz Kościuszko, who lived here until 1764. On February 4, 1746, Tadeusz Kościuszko was born here, in a manor house. After the Third Partition of Poland (1795), the village came under control of the Russian Empire, where it remained until 1916. During the January Uprising, on June 8, 1863, it was the site of a battle between Polish insurgents and Russian troops. From 1918 to 1939, it belonged to the Second Polish Republic.

In September 1939, it was occupied by the Soviet Union during the Soviet invasion of Poland in World War II, and annexed to Byelorussian Soviet Socialist Republic. In 1941, it was occupied by Nazi Germany. On 24–25 July 1942, German police forces and their collaborators deported approximately 1,200 Jews from the ghetto in nearby Kosów Poleski and executed them near the village. In 1942, the house in which Kościuszko was born and spent the first 12 years of his life was burned down by Soviet partisans. In 1944, the village was re-occupied by the Soviet Union, and after the war, it remained in the Soviet Union.

== Kościuszko museum ==
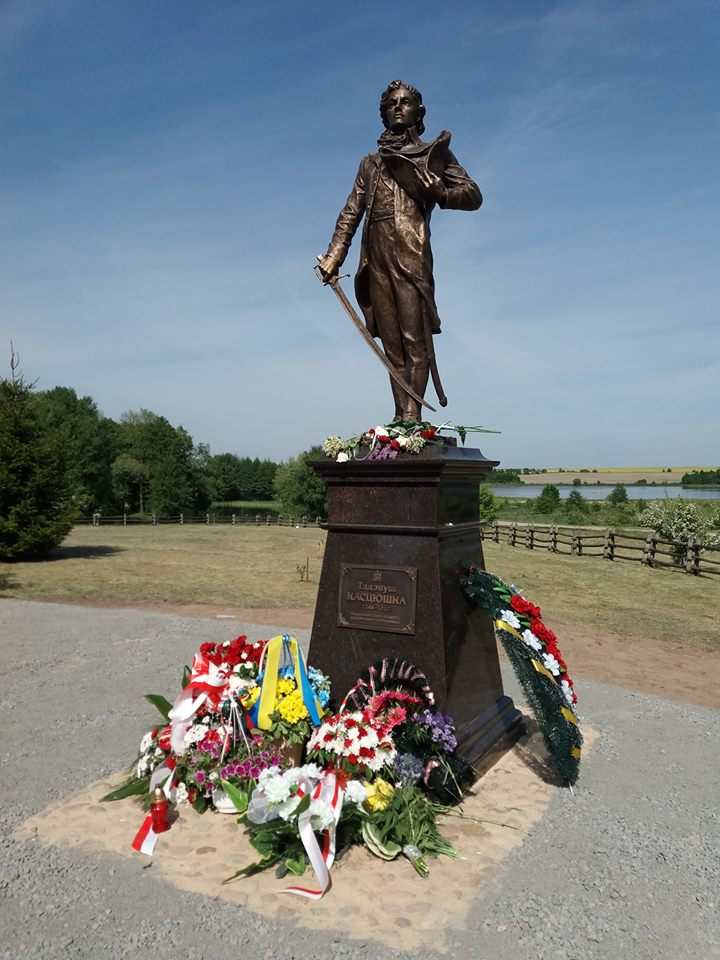
The first monument to Kościuszko in Belarus erected in 2018

In 2003, with financial support of the U.S. Embassy in Minsk, reconstruction of the house was started. Since several photos and drawings of the complex were preserved, the work was completed in a year. The house, based on the 18th century foundations, was opened for the public in 2004. Next to Kościuszko’s house a large rock was placed with a plaque that reads in Belarusian: “Here, in Merechevschina, Andrej Tadeusz Bonawentura Kasciuszka was born. He was the great son of the Belarusian land, who became a hero of Poland and USA, as well as Honorary Citizen of France”.
