= Kosava, Belarus =

Town in Brest Region, Belarus

Kosava Косава (Belarusian)
- Town
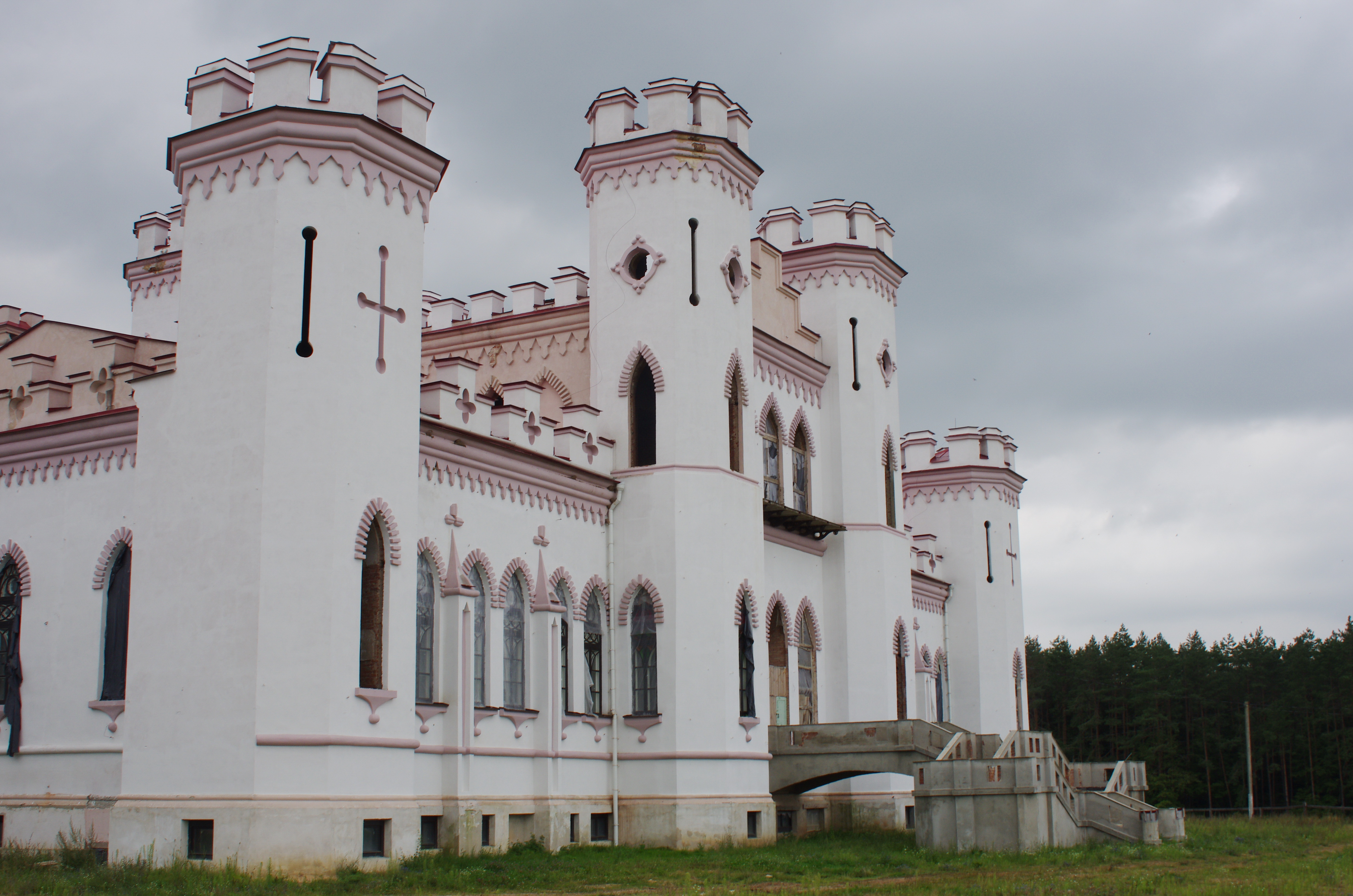
- Pusłowski palace

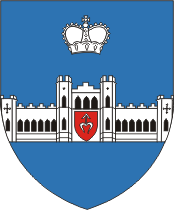
- Coat of arms

- Location within Belarus
- Coordinates: 52°45′N 25°09′E
- Country: Belarus
- Region: Brest Region
- District: Ivatsevichy District
- Mentioned: 1494

Population (2026)
  - Total: 1,770
- Time zone: UTC+3 (MSK)
- Postal code: 225262
- Area code: +375 1645
- License plate: 1

Kosava, or Kossovo, (Note: Belarusian: Косава, locally: Косаво; Russian: Коссово; Yiddish: קאסעוו, romanized: Kosev.) formerly known as Kosava-Palyeskaye, (Note: Belarusian: Косава-Палескае, romanized: Kosava-Palieskaje; Polish: Kosów Poleski.) is a town in Ivatsevichy District, Brest Region, in western Belarus. As of 2026, it has a population of 1,770.

The nearby village of Merechevschina is the birthplace of Tadeusz Kościuszko, with Kosava being the place of his baptism. Kosava is the birthplace of Rabbi Avraham Yeshayahu Karelitz. Nearby is the ruined Kosava Castle, built by the Pusłowski family in 1830, and a replica of Tadeusz Kościuszko's house in Mereczowszczyzna.

== History ==
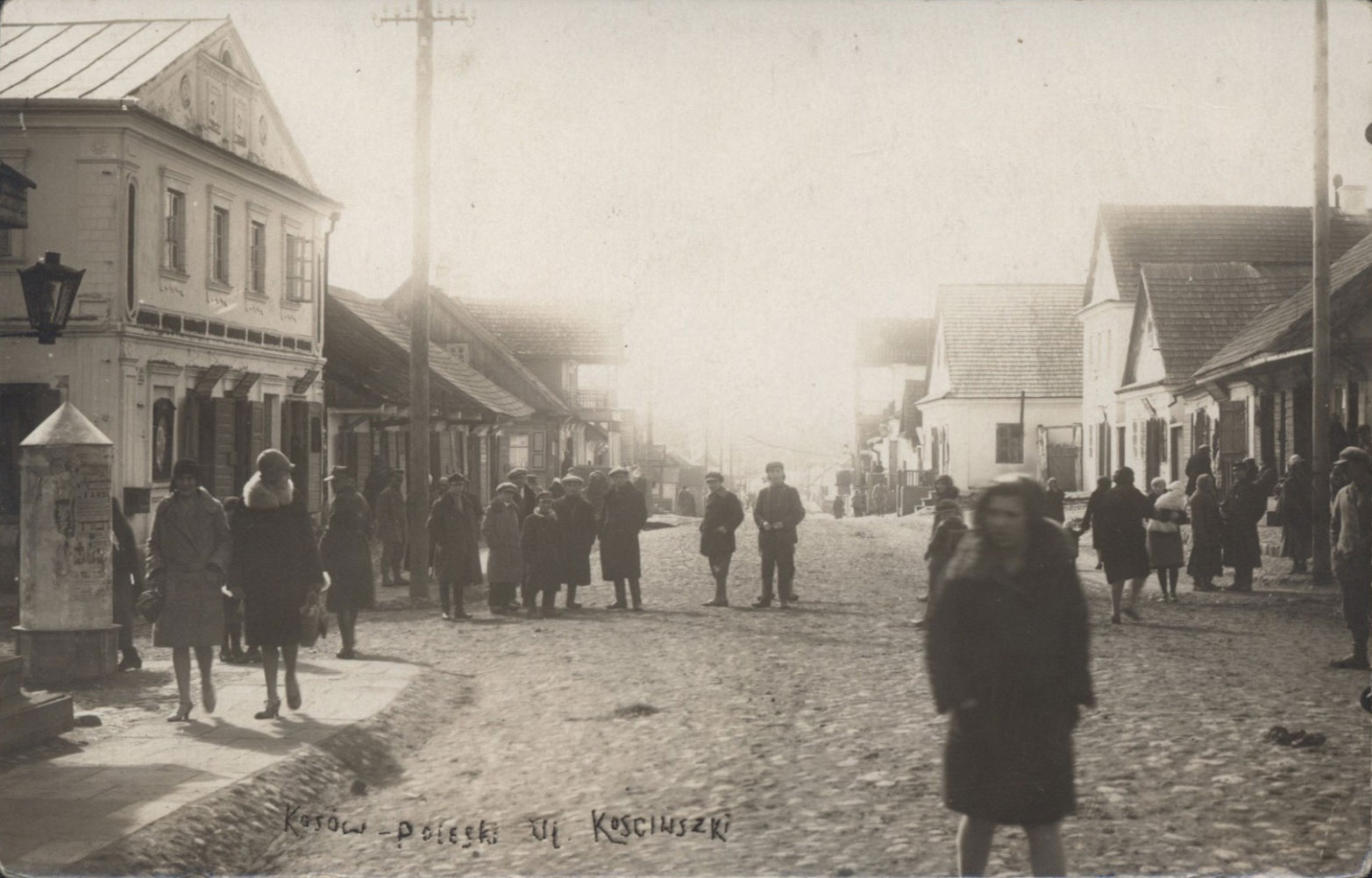
Kosów Poleski c. 1930

External image
- Page of Robotnik newspaper.

The first settlements in the area are known since the 10th and 11th centuries as part of Kievan Rus'. The first mention of the town was in 1494, when it was part of the Grand Duchy of Lithuania. It was a private town of the Chreptowicz, Sanguszko, Sapieha, Flemming, Czartoryski and Pusłowski noble families, administratively located in the Slonim County in the Nowogródek Voivodeship of the Polish–Lithuanian Commonwealth. Tadeusz Kościuszko, after being born in nearby Mereczowszczyzna in 1746, was baptized at the local church. After the Third Partition of Poland in 1795, it became part of the Russian Empire. The town was industrialized by the Pusłowski family.

From 1915 to 1918, the town was under German occupation during World War I. After the Polish–Soviet War, it was part of the Polesie Voivodeship in Poland, within which it was a county seat until it was moved to Iwacewicze in 1935. On 3 February 1927, as Polish newspaper Robotnik reported, Polish policemen shot manifestation of peasants that claimed to release imprisoned deputies.

=== World War II ===
Following the 1939 invasion of Poland, the town was first occupied by the Soviet Union until 1941, then by Nazi Germany until 1944. In 1941, the Germans established a ghetto for Jews, both locals and refugees who had previously fled the German occupiers from western and central Poland. The ghetto was liquidated in July 1942 with the Jews either deported to other locations or massacred in nearby Mereczowszczyzna. In July 1944, the town was re-occupied by the Soviet Union, and eventually annexed from Poland the following year.

== Demographics ==
Historical population
Year	Pop.	±%
1878	2,130	—
1921	2,433	+14.2%
1931	3,256	+33.8%
2024	1,862	−42.8%
2025	1,837	−1.3%
2026	1,770	−3.6%
