= Brest region =

Region of Belarus

Coordinates: 52°22′57″N 25°11′59″E

Brest region Брэсцкая вобласць (Belarusian) Брестская область (Russian)
- Region
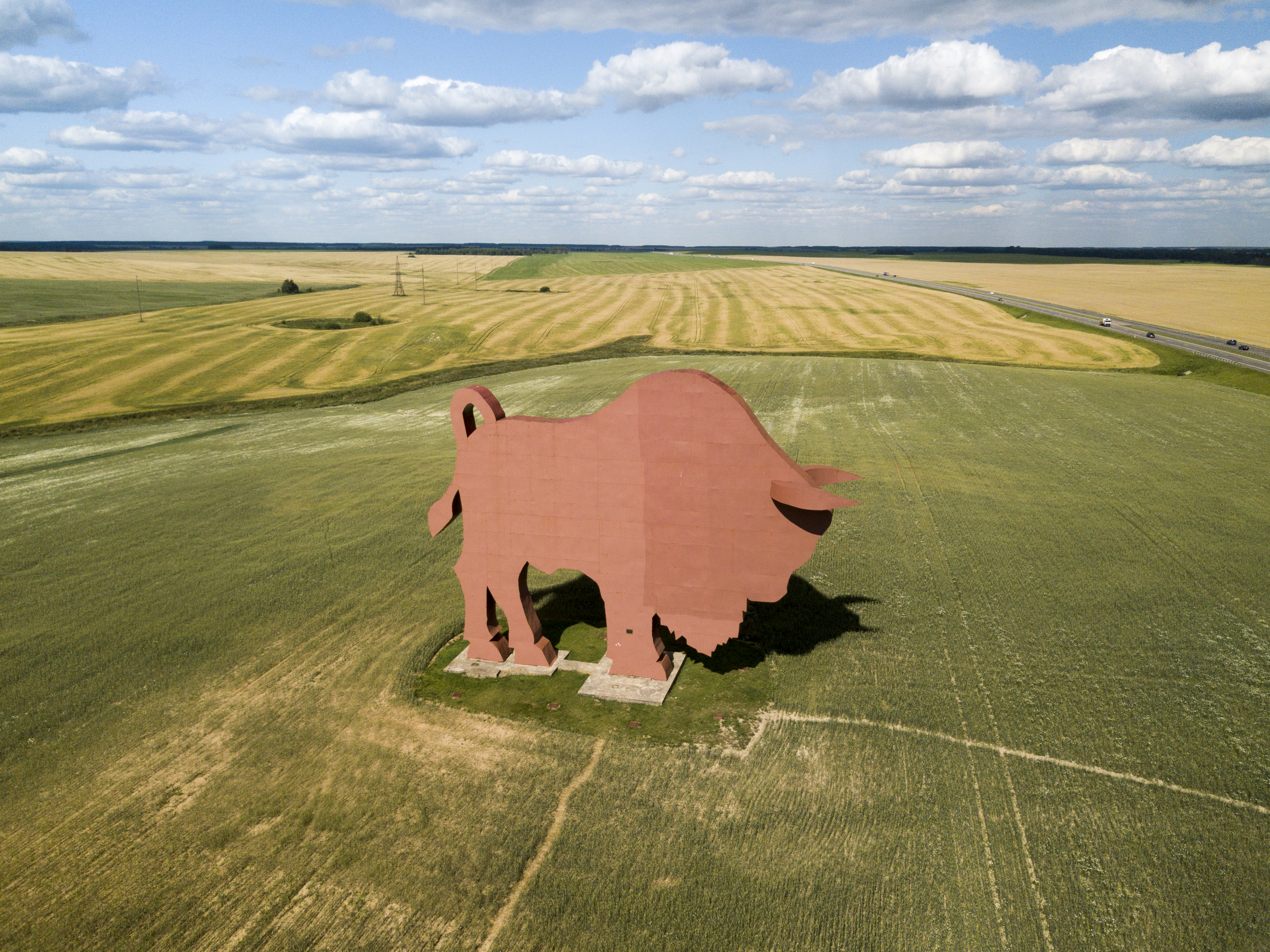
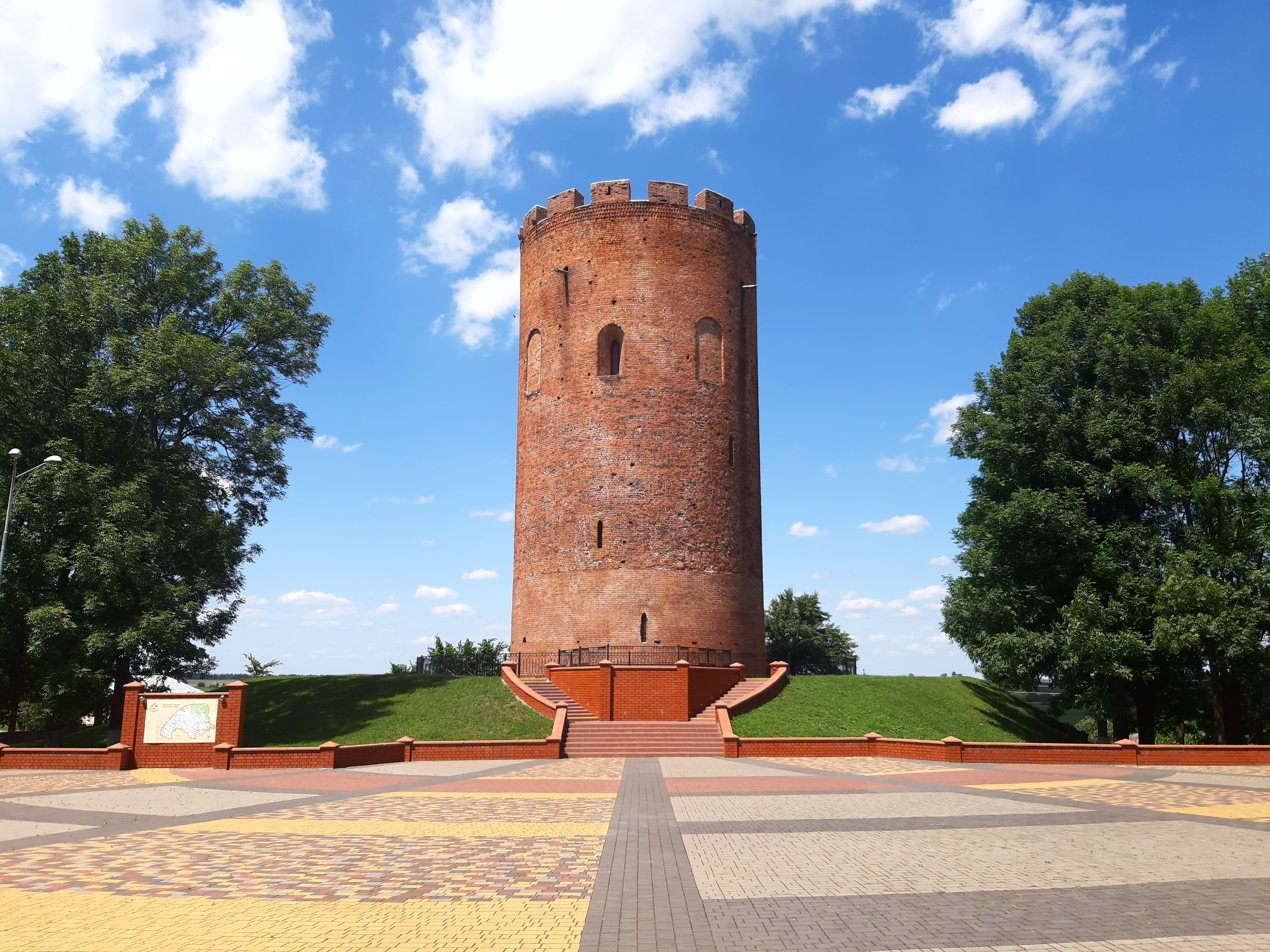
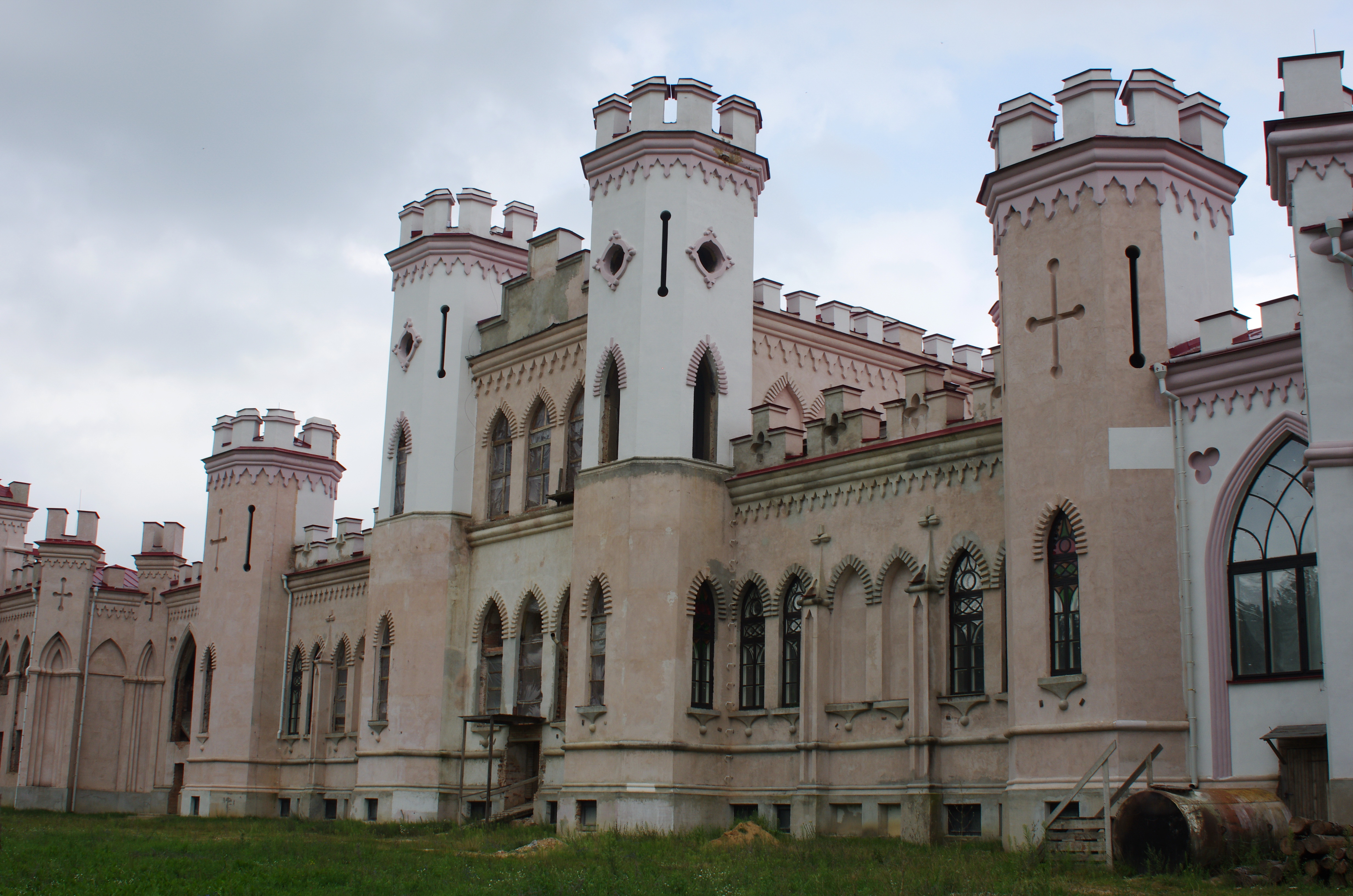
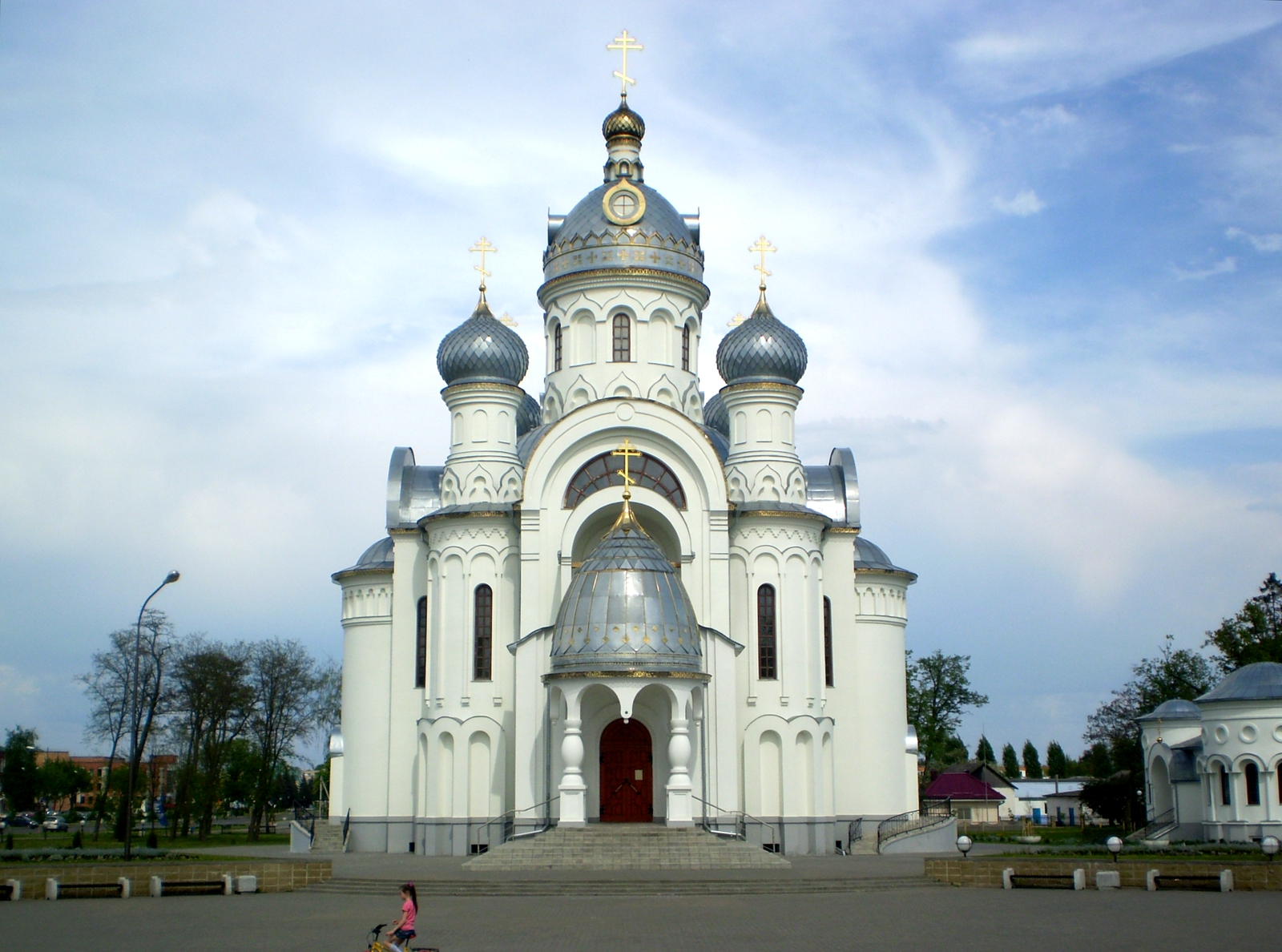
- From the top to bottom-right: Bison Statue at the entrance to the region, Tower of Kamyenyets, Kosava Castle, Khram Arkhangela Mikhaila, Courage Monument

- Flag Coat of arms

- Interactive map of Brest region
- Country: Belarus
- Administrative center: Brest
- Largest cities: Brest - 350,616; Baranavichy - 179,000; Pinsk - 137,960
- Districts: 16; Cities: 20; Urban localities: 9 Selsoviets: 225; Villages: 2,178
- Established: 1939

Government
  - Chairman: Piotr Parkhomchik

Area
  - Total: 32,790.68 km^{2} (12,660.55 sq mi)

Population (2024)
  - Total: 1,308,569
  - Density: 39.90674/km^{2} (103.3580/sq mi)

GDP (nominal,2024)
  - Total: Br 29.737 billion (US$9.108 billion)
  - Per capita: Br 22,800 (US$6,984)
- ISO 3166 code: BY-BR
- HDI (2022): 0.793 high · 3rd
- Website: www.brest-region.by

Brest region, also known as Brest oblast (Note: Russian: Брестская область, romanized: Brestskaya oblast'.) or Brest voblasts, (Note: Belarusian: Брэсцкая вобласць, romanized: Bresckaja voblasć.) is one of the six regions of Belarus. Its administrative center is Brest. Other major cities in the region include Baranavichy and Pinsk. As of 2024, it has a population of 1,308,569.

== Geography ==
It is located in the southwestern part of Belarus, bordering the Podlasie and Lublin voivodeships of Poland on the west, the Volyn Oblast and Rivne Oblast of Ukraine on the south, the Grodno region and Minsk region on the north, and Gomel region on the east. The region covers a total area of 32,800 km², about 15.7% of the national total.

The westernmost point of Belarus is situated in Kamyenyets District near the town of Vysokaye.

2.7% of the territory is covered by Belovezhskaya Pushcha National Park, 9.8% is covered by 17 wildlife preserves of national importance.

It is often dubbed the Western gateway to Belarus. Geographically, the Brest region belongs to the area known as Polesia. The area of the region was part of the Second Polish Republic from 1921 until 1939 largely as the Polesie Voivodeship, when it was joined to the Byelorussian Soviet Socialist Republic. Northeastern part of it was administered as part of Nowogródek Voivodeship.

== Demographics ==
The Brest region has a population of 1,380,391, about 14.7% of the national total. About 47.2% of the region's population are men, and the remaining 52.8% are women. Number of inhabitants per 1 km2 is 43. Share of urban population is increasing continuously since the 1950s (17.1% in 1950, 70.5% in 2017).

Of the major nationalities living in the Brest region, 1,262,600 are Belarusians (85%), 128,700 (8.6%) are Russians, 57,100 (3.8%) are Ukrainians, and 27,100 (1.8%) are Poles. 53.7% of the population speak Belarusian and 42.6% speak Russian as their native language.

Brest is the province with the highest birth rate in all of Belarus. As of 2008, the birth rate was 12.0 per 1000 and death rate was 13.4 per 1000. In 2017, 12.4% of live births were to unmarried women (average in Belarus — 18.1%).

As of 2018, share of the population under working age was 19.3% (average in Belarus — 17.9%), of working age — 55.7% (average in Belarus — 57.2%), over working age — 25% (average in Belarus — 25.1%).

In 2015—2017, the region had a positive net migration rate for international migration (+3,209 in 2015, +1,771 in 2016, +1,357 in 2017) and negative — for internal migration (-6,294 in 2015, -3,659 in 2016, -1,836 in 2017). In 2017, 6,944 people which departed from the Brest region arrived in Minsk, 2,219 — in the Minsk region, 2,118 — in the Hrodna region, less than 1,000 — in every other region.

| Year | 1939 | 1950 | 1955 | 1960 | 1965 | 1970 | 1975 | 1980 | 1985 |
|---|---|---|---|---|---|---|---|---|---|
| Population (thousands) | 1,208.9 | 1,186.2 | 1,142 | 1,191.5 | 1,234.4 | 1,292.8 | 1,332.8 | 1,367 | 1,407.5 |
| Year | 1990 | 1995 | 2000 | 2005 | 2006 | 2007 | 2008 | 2009 | 2010 |
| Population (thousands) | 1,460.5 | 1,497.4 | 1,481.9 | 1,439.3 | 1,426.8 | 1,417.8 | 1,409.7 | 1,404.5 | 1,399.2 |
| Year | 2011 | 2012 | 2013 | 2014 | 2015 | 2016 | 2017 | 2018 | 2019 |
| Population (thousands) | 1,394.8 | 1,391.4 | 1,390.4 | 1,388.5 | 1,388.9 | 1,387.0 | 1,386.4 | 1,384.5 | 1,380.4 |
| Year | 2023 | | | | | | | | |
| Population (thousands) | 1,315.4 | | | | | | | | |

| Birth & death rates | 1950 | 1960 | 1970 | 1980 | 1985 | 1990 | 1995 | 2000 | 2005 | 2010 | 2011 | 2012 | 2013 | 2014 | 2015 | 2016 | 2017 |
|---|---|---|---|---|---|---|---|---|---|---|---|---|---|---|---|---|---|
| Birth rate | 26.3 | 25.5 | 17.4 | 16.8 | 17.1 | 15 | 11.3 | 10.8 | 10.4 | 12.2 | 12.7 | 13.1 | 13.2 | 13.4 | 13.5 | 13.5 | 11.8 |
| Death rate | 9 | 6.9 | 7.6 | 9.9 | 10.6 | 10.5 | 12.5 | 12.7 | 14.2 | 14.3 | 14.2 | 13.1 | 13 | 12.6 | 12.7 | 12.6 | 12.8 |

| Life expectancy at birth | 1990 | 1995 | 2000 | 2005 | 2010 | 2015 | 2016 | 2017 |
|---|---|---|---|---|---|---|---|---|
| Overall | 72 | 69.5 | 69.8 | 69.3 | 70.9 | 74.2 | 74.5 | 74.4 |
| female | 76.3 | 74.9 | 75.6 | 75.7 | 77 | 78.9 | 79.4 | 79.3 |
| male | 67.3 | 64.4 | 64.2 | 63.3 | 65.1 | 69.2 | 69.4 | 69.4 |

| Marriages and divorces | 1950 | 1960 | 1970 | 1980 | 1990 | 1995 | 2000 | 2005 | 2010 | 2015 | 2016 | 2017 |
|---|---|---|---|---|---|---|---|---|---|---|---|---|
| Marriages (total) | 11,743 | 11,613 | 11,639 | 13,366 | 14,029 | 11,386 | 9,453 | 10,660 | 11,060 | 11,155 | 9,016 | 9,123 |
| Marriages (per 1000 population) | 10 | 9.7 | 9 | 9.7 | 9.6 | 7.6 | 6.4 | 7.4 | 7.9 | 8 | 6.5 | 6.6 |
| Divorces (total) | 202 | 820 | 1,886 | 3,193 | 3,502 | 4,758 | 5,343 | 3,826 | 4,762 | 4,252 | 4,186 | 4,108 |
| Divorces (per 1000 population) | 0.2 | 0.7 | 1.5 | 2.3 | 2.4 | 3.2 | 3.6 | 2.7 | 3.4 | 3.1 | 3 | 3 |

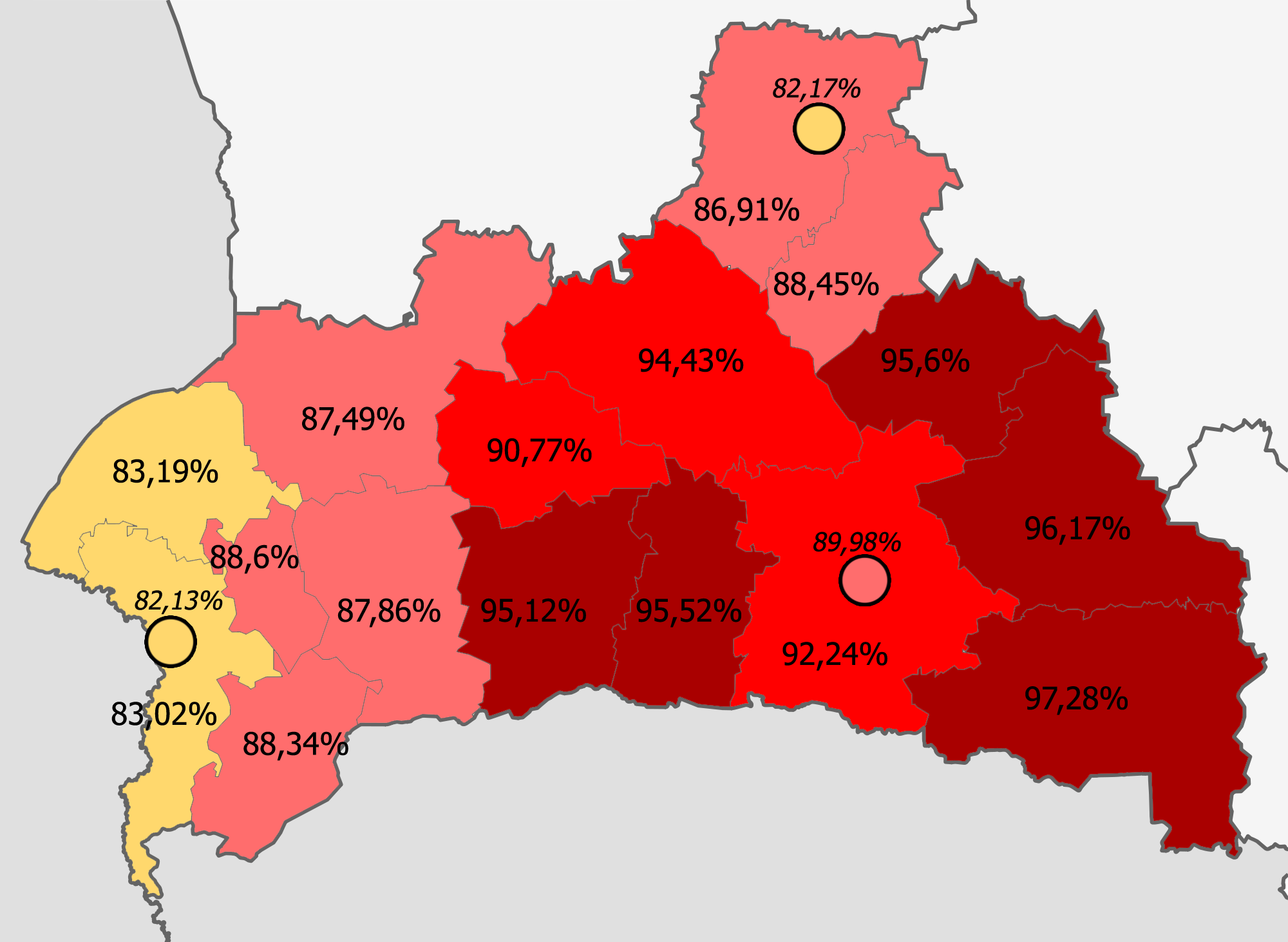
Belarusians in the region
>95%
90—95%
85—90%
<85%

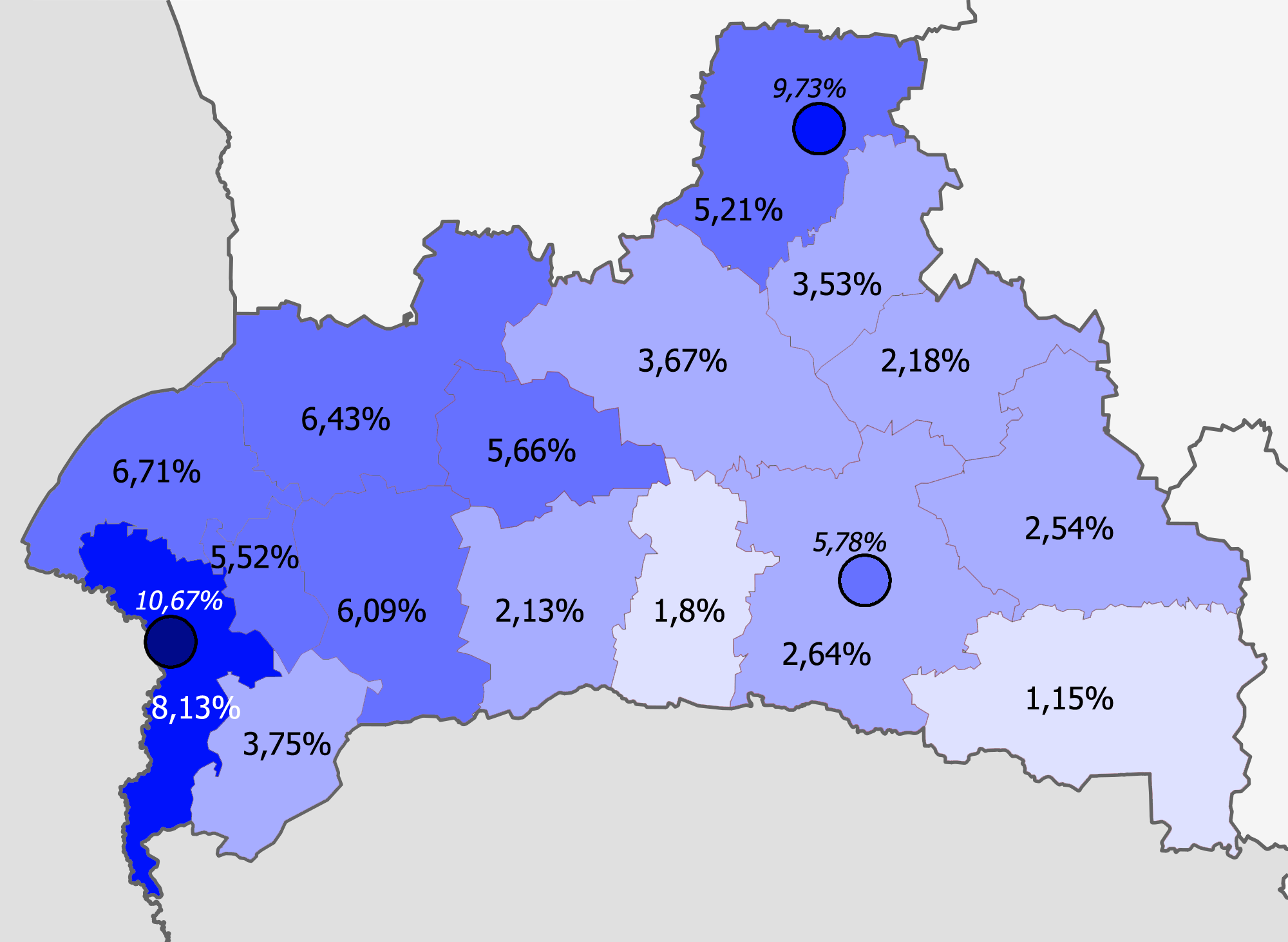
Russians in the region
>10%
8–10%
5–8%
2–5%
<2%

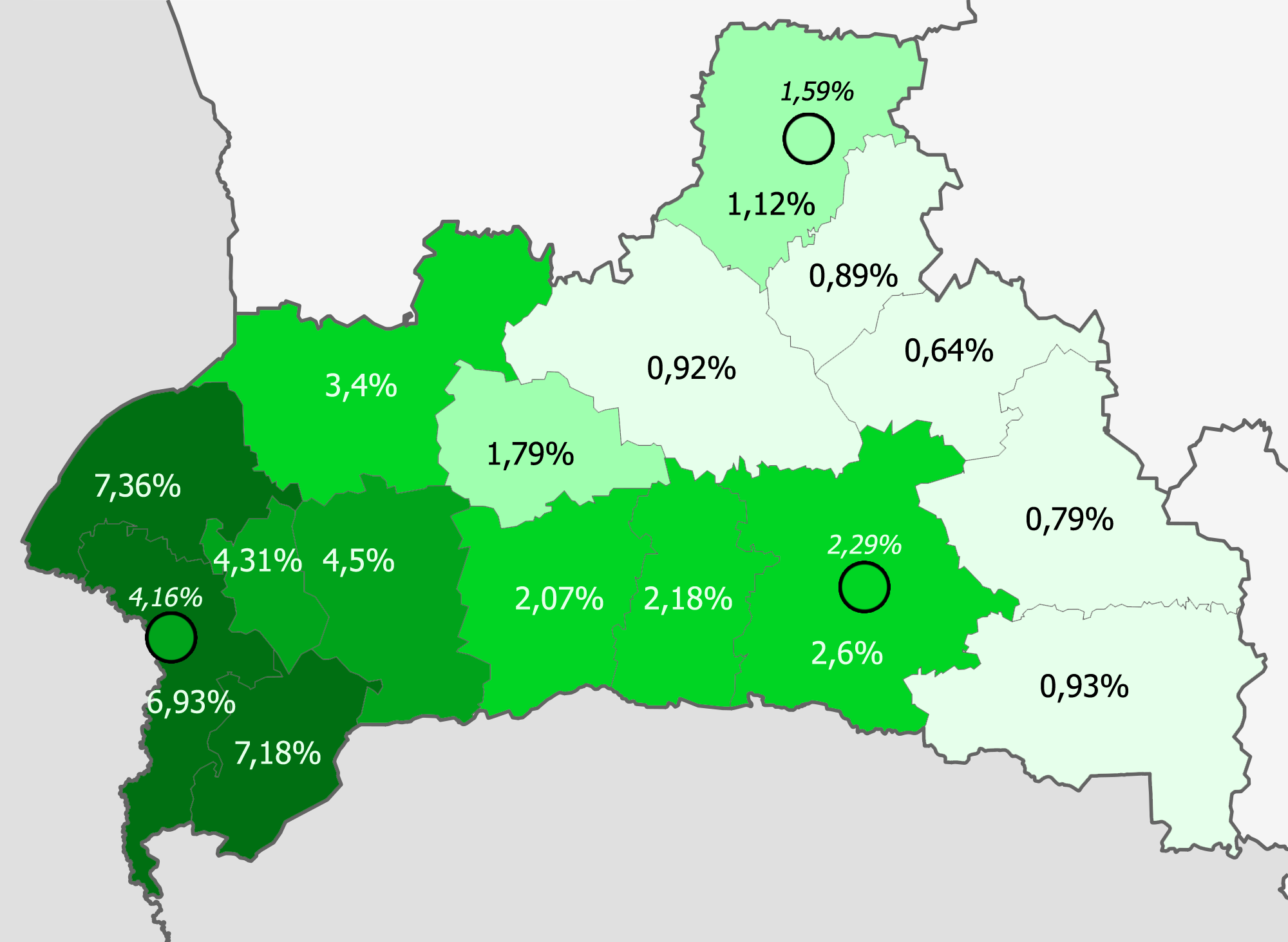
Ukrainians in the region
>6%
4–6%
2–4%
1–2%
<1%

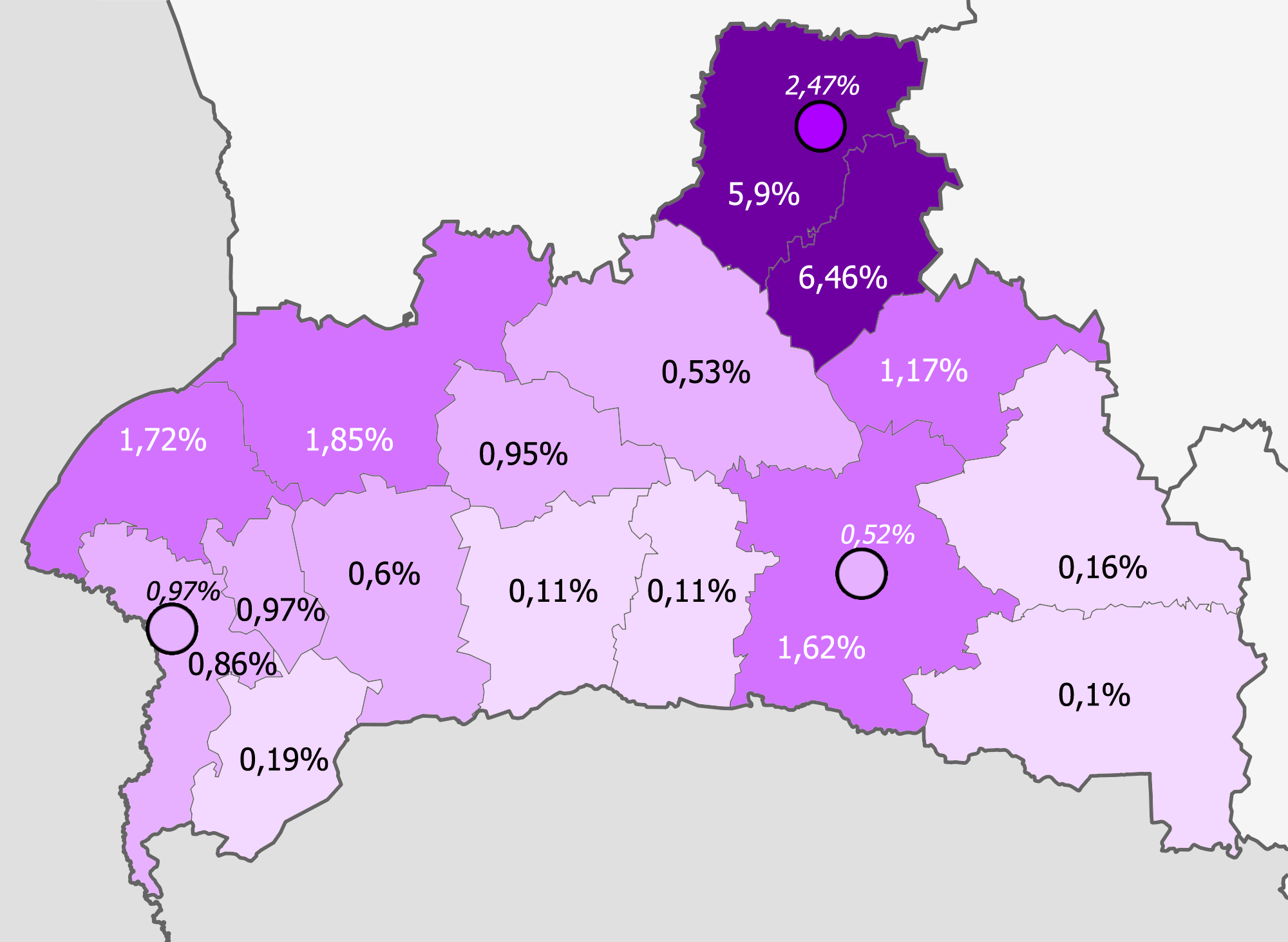
Poles in the region
>5%
2–5%
1–2%
0.5–1%
<0.5%
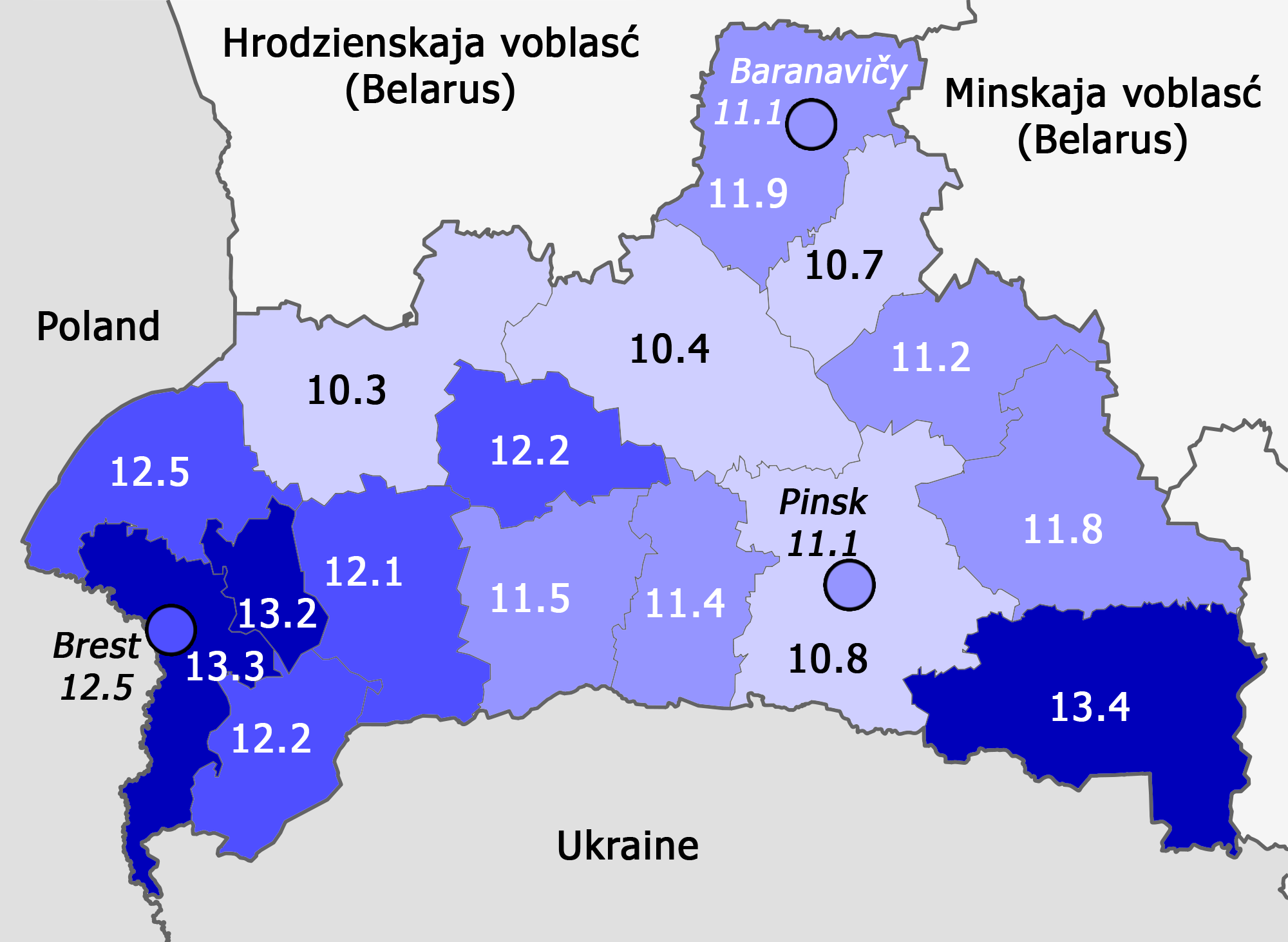
Birth rates by districts and major cities (2017)

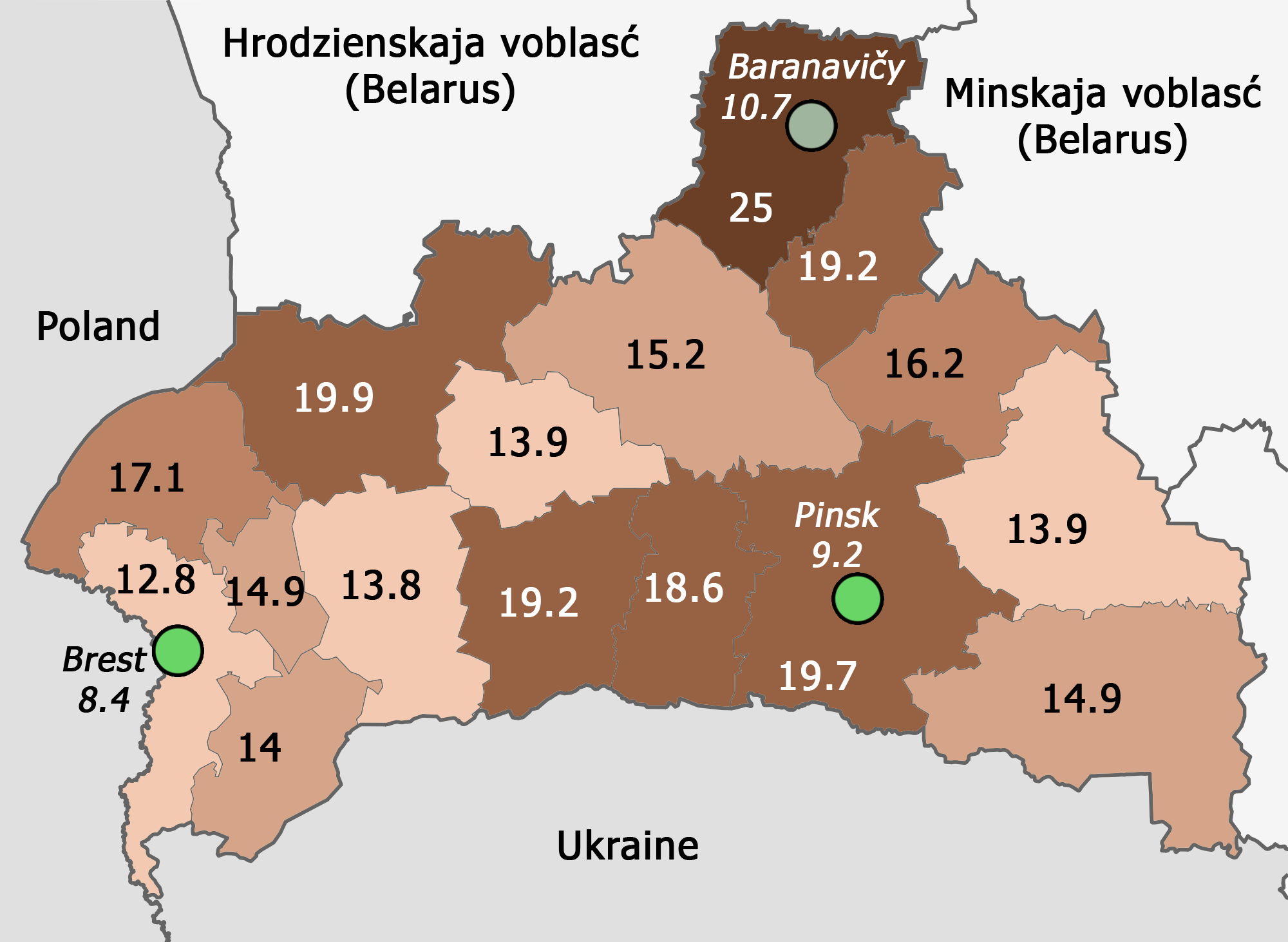
Mortality rates by districts and major cities (2017)

== Administrative territorial entities ==
The region was formed in 1939 after reunification of Western Belarus and the Byelorussian SSR. Today it comprises 16 districts (raions), 225 rural councils (selsoviets), 20 cities, 5 city municipalities, 9 urban-type settlements, and 2178 villages.

=== Districts of Brest region ===
The sixteen raions (districts) of the Brest region are:

- Baranavichy District
- Brest District
- Byaroza District
- Drahichyn District
- Hantsavichy District
- Ivanava District
- Ivatsevichy District
- Kamyenyets District
- Kobryn District
- Luninyets District
- Lyakhavichy District
- Malaryta District
- Pinsk District
- Pruzhany District
- Stolin District
- Zhabinka District

=== Cities and towns ===
| Latin | Belarusian | Russian | Pop. (2023) |
|---|---|---|---|
| Brest | Брэст | Брест | 342,461 |
| Baranavichy | Баранавiчы | Барановичи | 172,150 |
| Pinsk | Пінск | Пинск | 124,613 |
| Kobryn | Кобрын | Кобрин | 52,670 |
| Byaroza | Бяроза | Берёза | 28,397 |
| Luninyets | Лунінец | Лунинец | 23,548 |
| Ivatsevichy | Івацэвічы | Ивацевичи | 22,487 |
| Pruzhany | Пружаны | Пружаны | 19,064 |
| Ivanava | Іванава | Иваново | 16,272 |
| Drahichyn | Драгічын | Дрогичин | 14,856 |
| Zhabinka | Жабінка | Жабинка | 14,231 |
| Stolin | Столін | Столин | 13,550 |
| Hantsavichy | Ганцавічы | Ганцевичи | 13,486 |
| Malaryta | Маларыта | Малорита | 12,850 |
| Mikashevichy | Мікашэвічы | Микашевичи | 12,395 |
| Byelaazyorsk | Белаазёрск | Белоозёрск | 10,997 |
| Lyakhavichy | Ляхавічы | Ляховичи | 10,613 |
| Kamyanyets | Камянец | Каменец | 8,316 |
| Davyd-Haradok | Давыд-Гарадок | Давид-Городок | 5,774 |
| Vysokaye | Высокае | Высокое | 4,843 |
| Kosava | Косава | Коссово | 1,872 |

== Tourism ==
There are about 70 travel agencies in Brest region, most of them provide both agent and operator activities. Main tourist attractions in the region are Belovezhskaya Puscha and Brest Fortress.

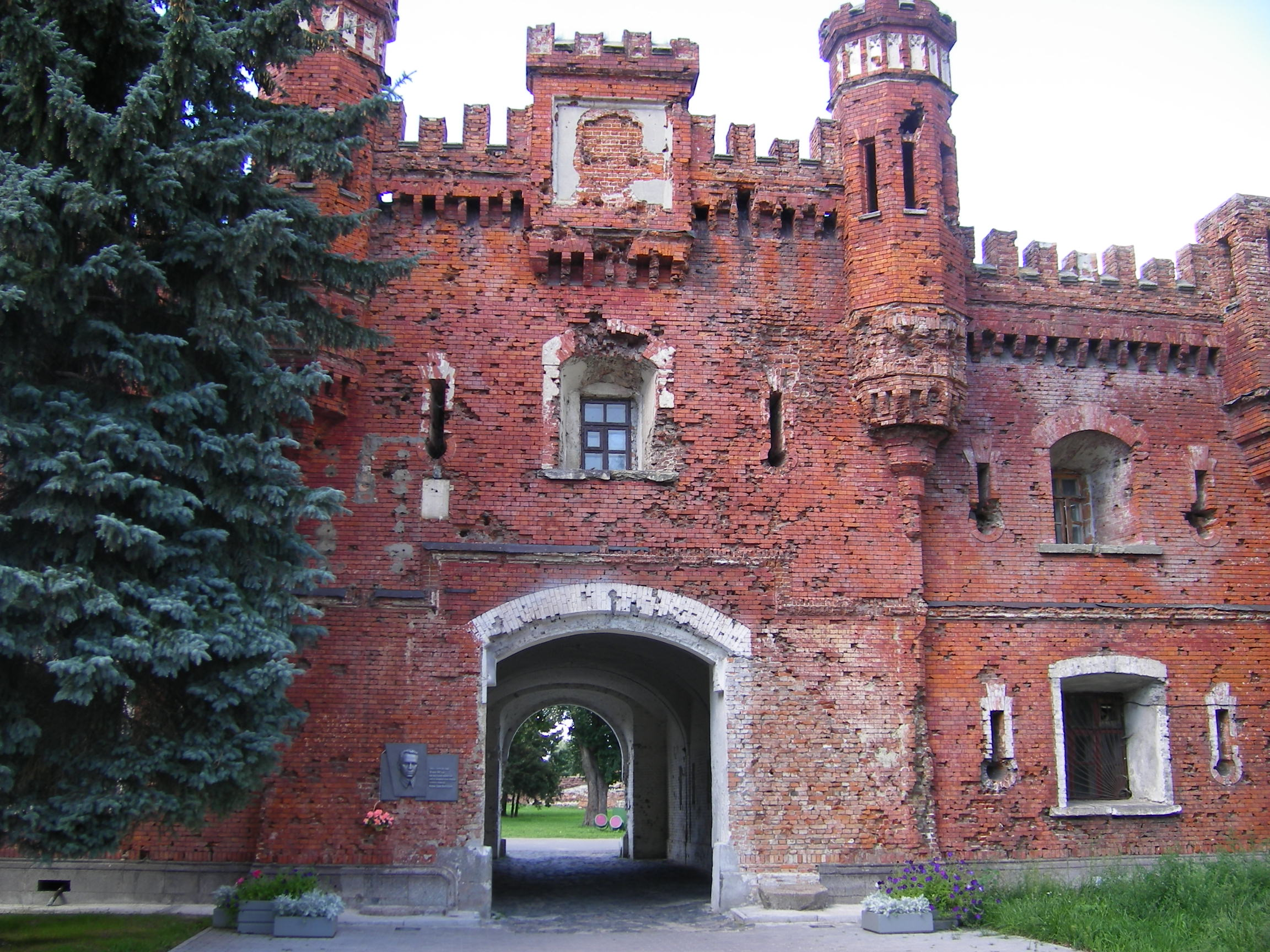
Brest Fortress.

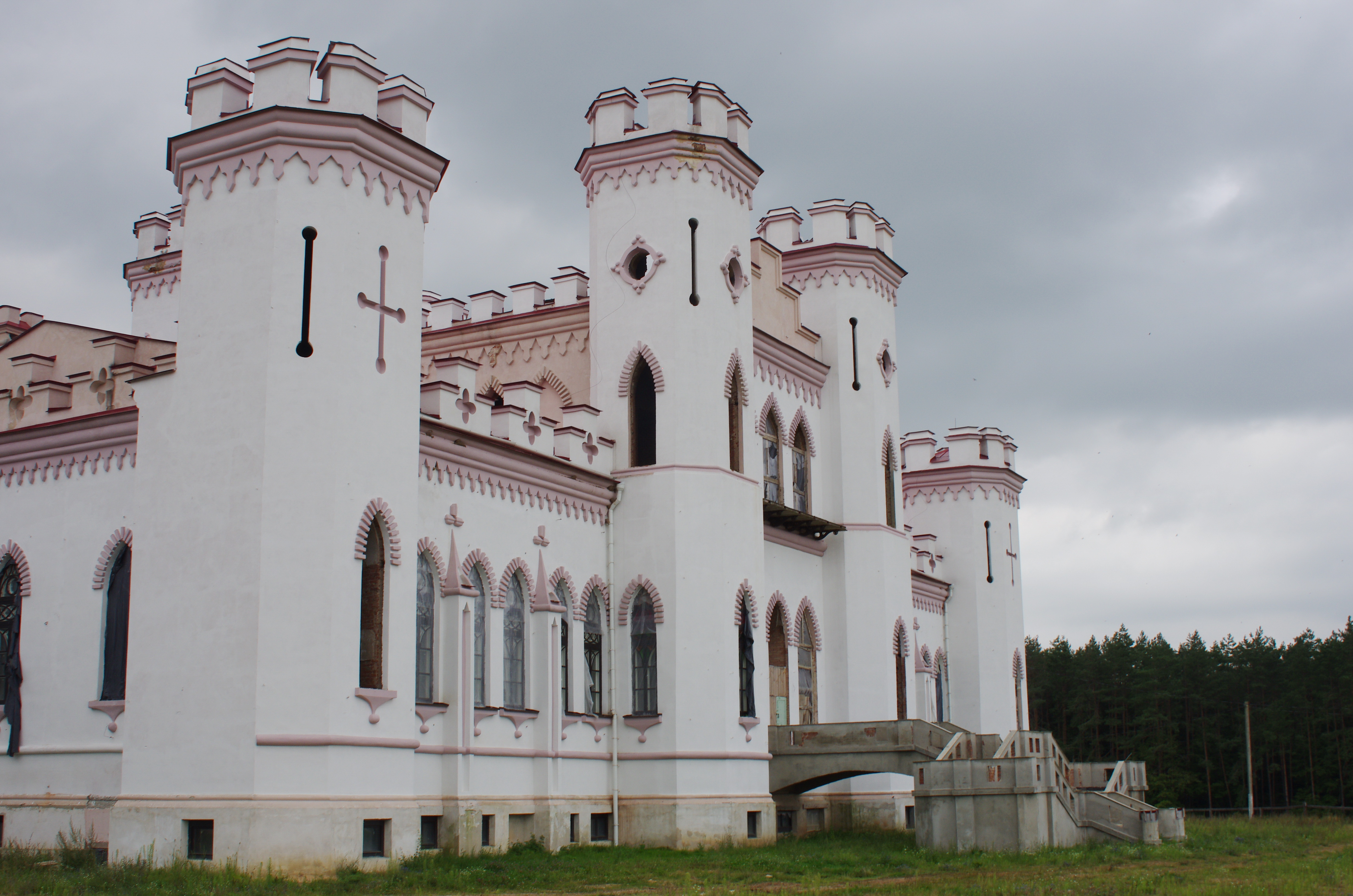
Palace in Kosava.

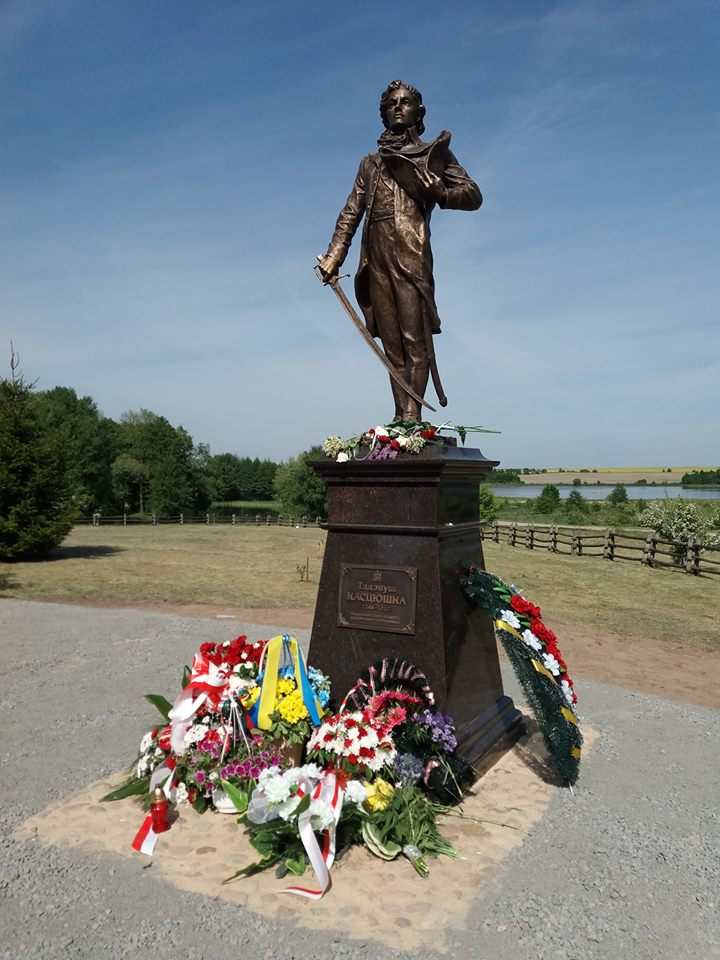
Tadeusz Kościuszko birthplace in Mieračoŭščyna.

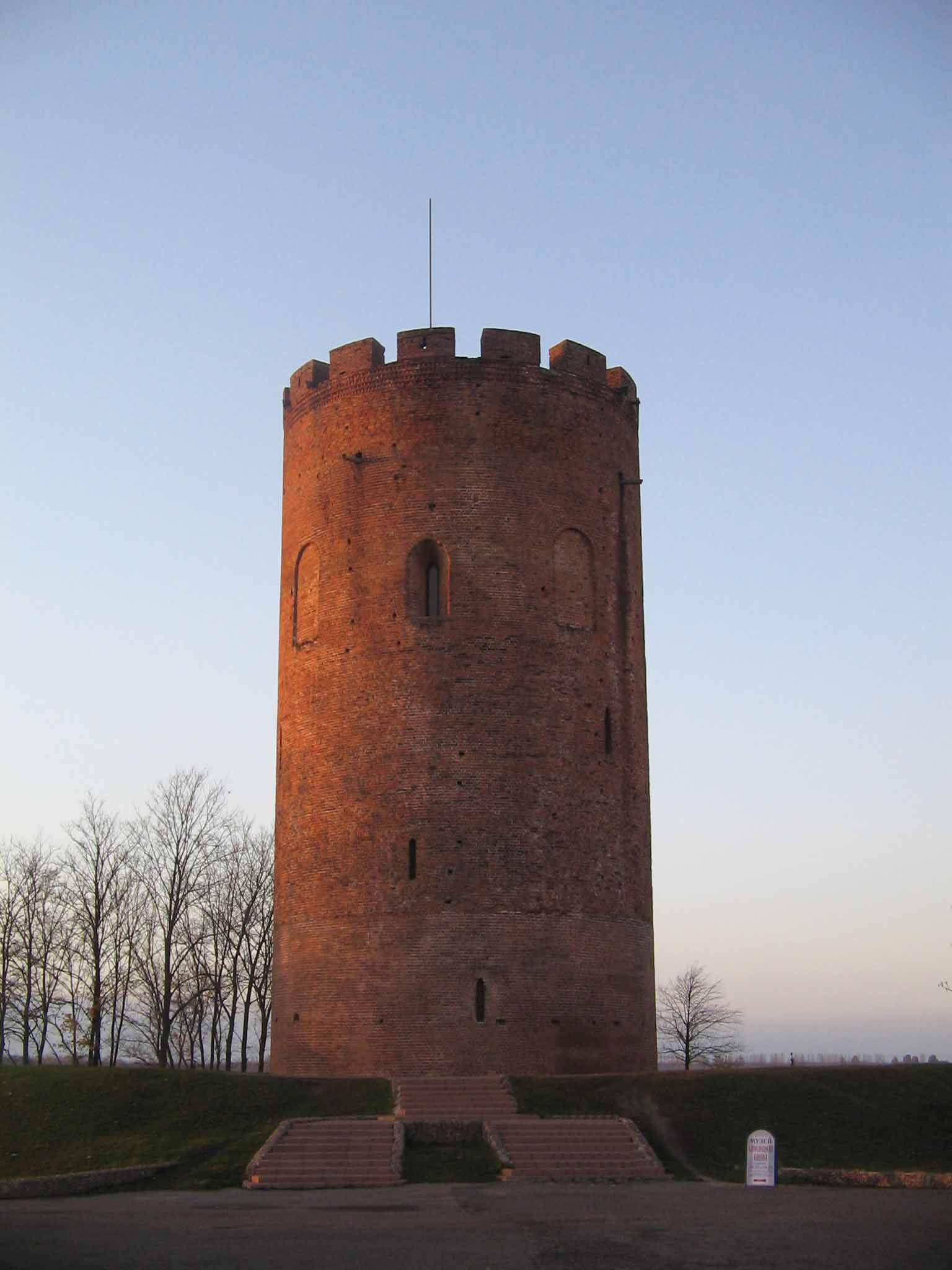
The Kamianiec Tower.

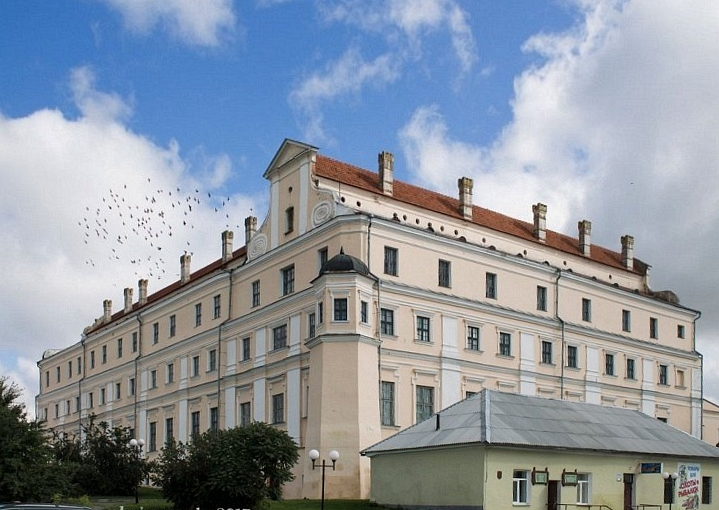
The Jesuit Collegium in Pinsk.

== Economy ==
As of 2017, the industrial output of the region amounted to Br 10,578,000 (~US$5,300 million), or 11.2% of the Belarusian industrial output.

Food industry is the leading economy sphere in the region (47.6% of the region's industrial output). The biggest industrial plants in the region are "Savushkin produkt" (dairy products), "Santa Bremor" (fish products), Brestgazoapparat (gas equipment, including "Gefest" cookers; all three are situated in Brest), "Pinskdrev" in Pinsk (furniture, matches and other wood products), "Polesie" in Kobryn (toys and plastic products). Other major factories are machine tool plant "Atlant", cotton factory, military jet fighters repair plant (all three are situated in Baranavichy (Baranovichi)), sugar plant in Zhabinka, "Polesie" textile and garment factory in Pinsk, "Ivacevichidrev" wood products plant in Ivacevichi, "Granite" quarry in Mikashevichi, "Belsolod" malt factory in Ivanava (the only such plant in Belarus).

Food factories in the region produced 153.9 thousand tons of meat and offal in 2017, 90 thousand tons of sausage products, 29.7 thousand tons of meat semi-finished products, 71.8 tons of fish and semi-finished products (including canned fish), 551.9 thousand tons of whole milk products, 47.2 thousand tons of cottage cheese, 66.1 thousand tons of cheese, 21.3 thousand tons of butter, 108.2 thousand tons of flour, 2.5 million decalitres of beer and 4.3 million decalitres of distilled alcoholic beverages. Textile and garment factories produced 56,361 thousand m^{2} of fabrics in 2017, 994 thousand m^{2} of carpets, 5.9 million pieces of all types of knitwear, 1.9 million pieces of outerwear (except knitwear), 28.4 million pairs of socks and similar hosiery, 623 thousand shoes. Electrical plants in the region produced 242.2 thousand electric engines (alternating current), 4800 transformers, 899 thousand lamps. Brest lamp factory is producing incandescent light bulbs, 2 factories are engaged in production of diodes and printed circuit boards.

Byarozaŭskaja (Berezovskaya) thermal power plant in Byaroza District is one of the biggest power plants in Belarus (1095 MW, 4.8 GW·h annually). As of 2018, it had 4 power generating units with combined cycle gas turbines.

As of 2017, total cultivated area in the region was 930,000 hectares, including 844,400 hectares of land used by agricultural organizations (mainly state-owned), 17,900 hectares — by the registered farmers, and 67,700 hectares — by personal farms of the population. 383,800 hectares of fields were used to grow cereals, 52,800 — rapeseeds, 21,800 — sugar beets, 5,700 — flax, 56,300 — potatoes, 12,700 — vegetables, 392,800 — feed crops. Big agricultural organizations harvest almost all cereals, flax, sugar beets, rapeseeds and feed crops, while farmers (both registered and not) harvest more than 90% of potatoes (1,144,400 tons of 1,266,200 in the region) and vegetables (409,400 tons of 439,200 in the region). Average cereal yield in the region in 2017 was 3,480 kg per hectare (average in Belarus — 3,330), sugar beet yield — 43,900 kg per hectare (average in Belarus — 49,900), flax fiber yield — 1,160 kg per hectare (average in Belarus — 920). Due to warm mild climate and personal activity, the region leads in the production of many fruits, vegetables and berries in Belarus. Several villages are widely known as a "cucumber capital", "strawberry capital", "carrot capital", etc.

As of 2018, agricultural organizations and farmers kept 861,600 cattle (including 301,100 cows), 491,100 pigs, 10,000 horses, 19,500 sheep, 7,605,000 poultry. In 2017, all types of farms in the region produced 218,700 tons of livestock and poultry meat (in slaughter weight), 1,605,000 tons of milk (second place among the regions of Belarus) and 606.8 million eggs (second place).

== See also ==
- Poland’s Nowogrodek Voivodeship (1919-1939)
- Beresteishchyna
