= Alphonse Bichebois =

French painter

- Born: Louis-Pierre-Alphonse Bichebois; 14 April 1801; Paris, France
- Died: 17 April 1851; Paris, France
- Known for: Lithography

Louis-Pierre-Alphonse Bichebois, sometimes called Louis-Philippe-Alphonse Bichebois (14 April 1801 – April 17, 1851) was a French engraver and lithographer specializing in landscapes.

He was a student of Jean-Baptiste Regnault and Jean-Charles-Joseph Rémond.

== Selected pieces ==
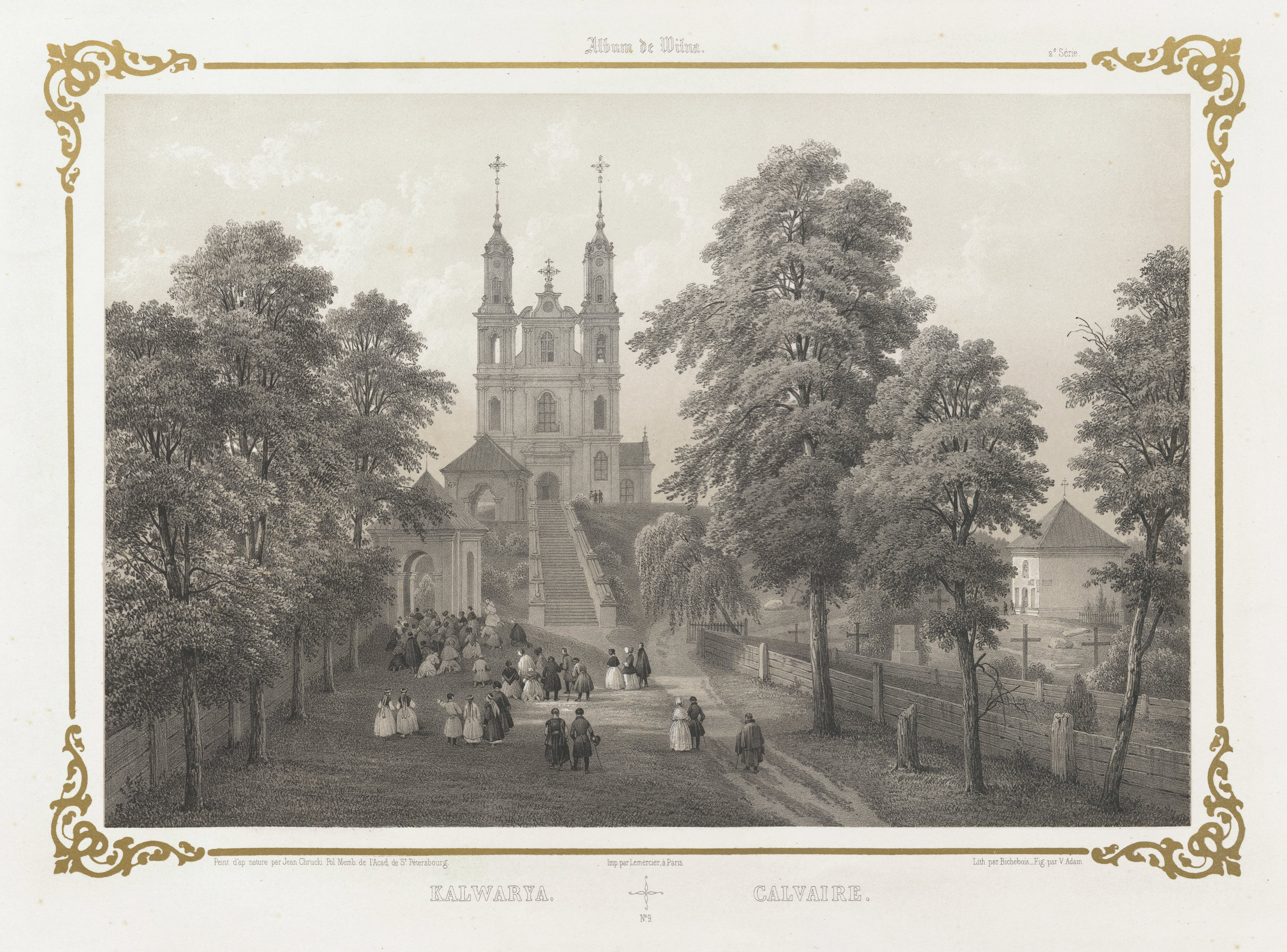
Calvary church near Vilnius
(1848-1849)

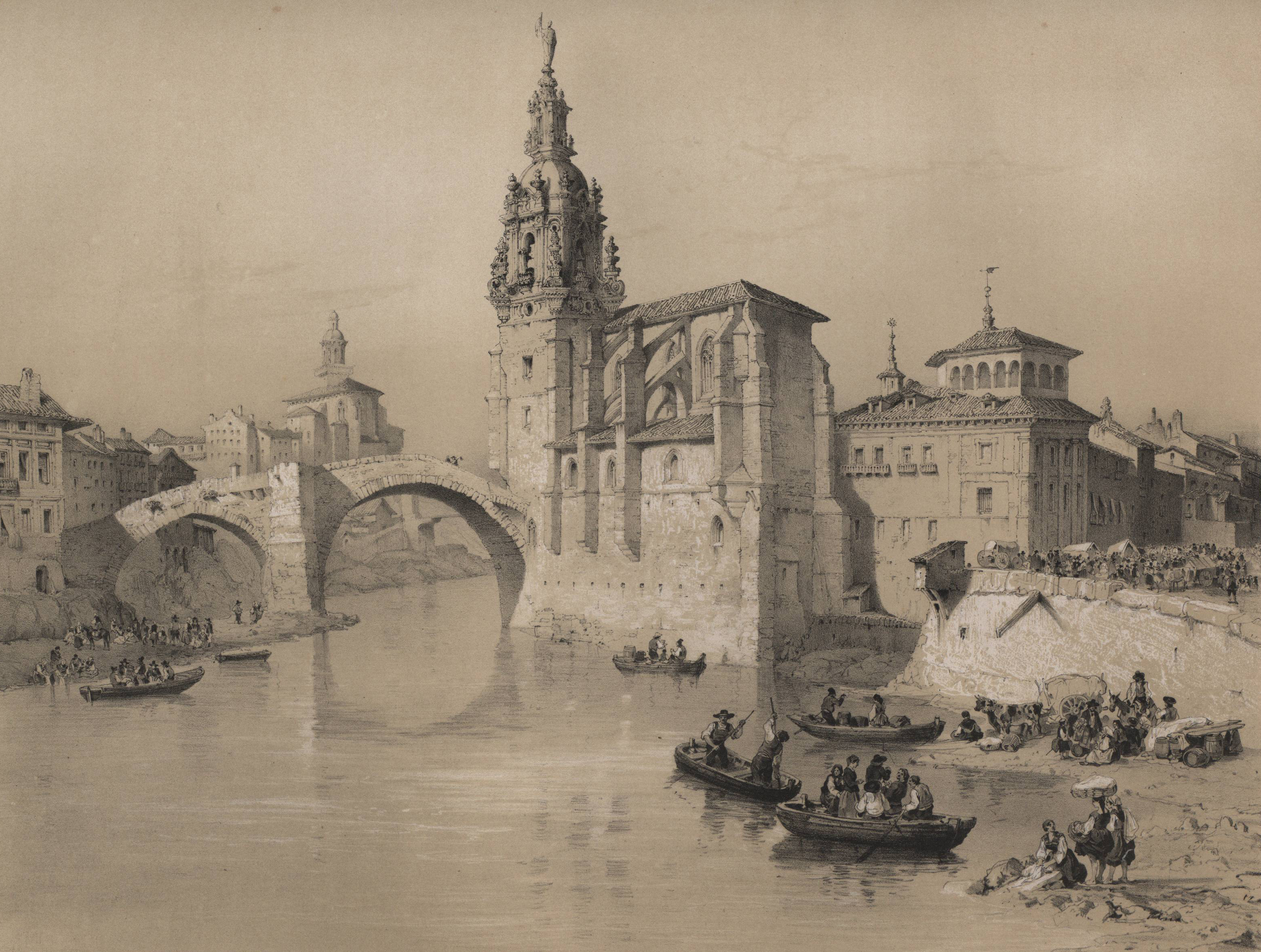
St. Anthony the Great Church in Bilbao
(1850)

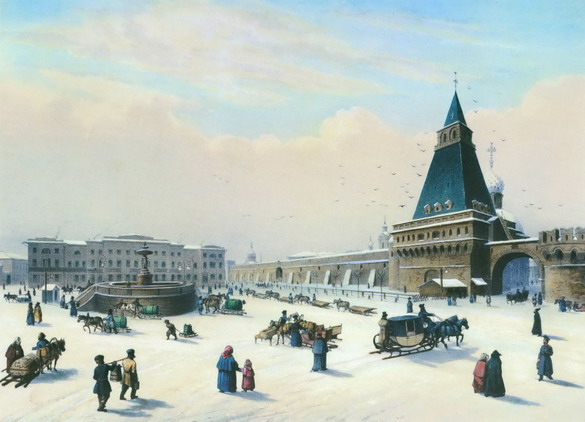
View of Lubyanka Square
