= Ivatsevichy district =

District of Brest region, Belarus

Ivatsevichy district Івацэвіцкі раён (Belarusian) Ивацевичский район (Russian)
- District
- Flag Coat of arms

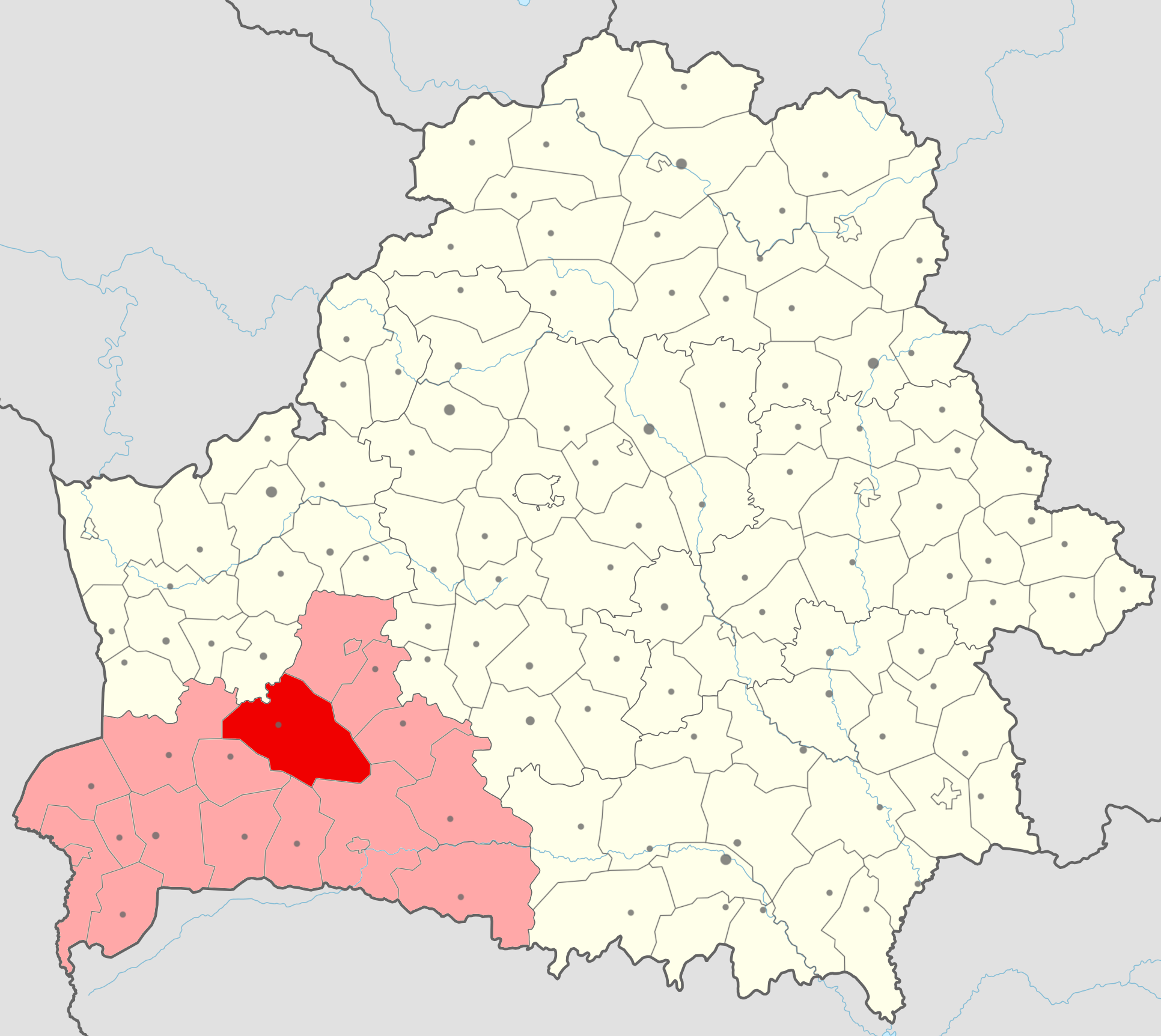
- Coordinates: 52°42′47″N 25°20′34″E
- Country: Belarus
- Region: Brest region
- Administrative center: Ivatsevichy

Area
  - District: 2,998.11 km^{2} (1,157.58 sq mi)

Population (2024)
  - District: 50,196
  - Density: 16.743/km^{2} (43.363/sq mi)
  - Urban: 27,940
  - Rural: 22,256
- Time zone: UTC+3 (MSK)
- Website: ivacevichi.brest-region.gov.by

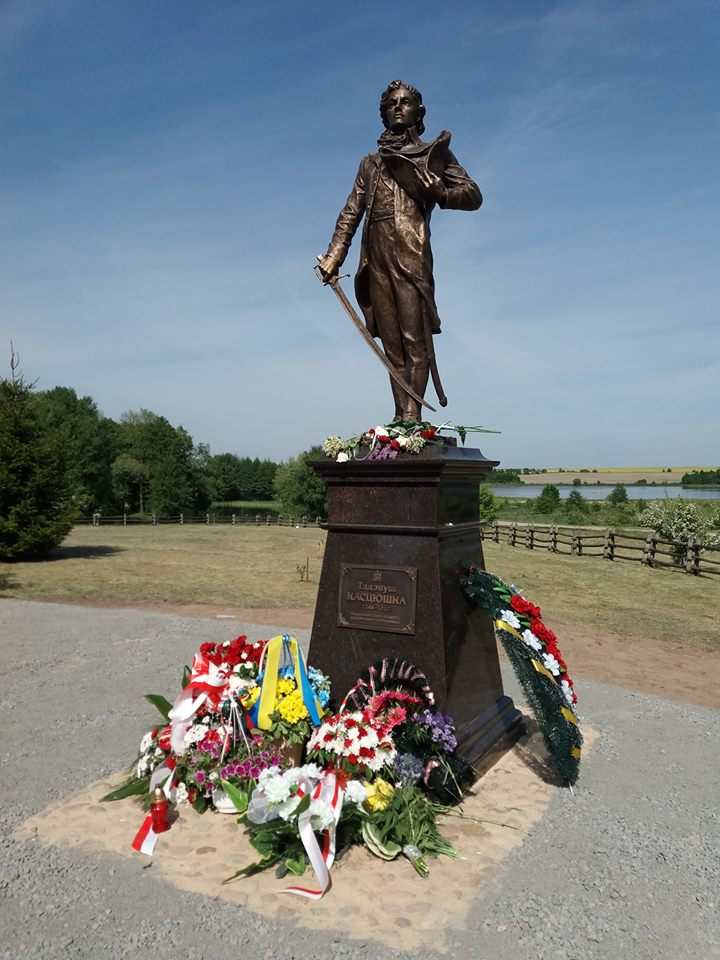
The first monument to Tadeusz Kościuszko in Belarus erected in Mieračoŭščyna in 2018

Ivatsevichy district or Ivacevičy district (Belarusian: Івацэвіцкі раён; Russian: Ивацевичский район) is a district (raion) of Brest region in Belarus. Its administrative center is Ivatsevichy. As of 2024, it has a population of 50,196.

Vygonoschanskoye Lake, the sixth-largest lake in Belarus, is situated in the district.

== Demographics ==
At the time of the 2009 Belarusian census, Ivatsevichy district had a population of 59,906. Of these, 94.4% were of Belarusian, 3.7% Russian, 0.9% Ukrainian and 0.5% Polish ethnicity. 76.5% spoke Belarusian and 22.7% Russian as their native language. In 2023, it had a population of 50,922.

== Notable residents ==
- Tadeusz Kościuszko (1746, Mieračoŭščyna estate – 1817), Polish military leader
