= Kosava Castle =

Former castle in Kosava, Belarus

Coordinates: 52°45′56″N 25°07′18″E

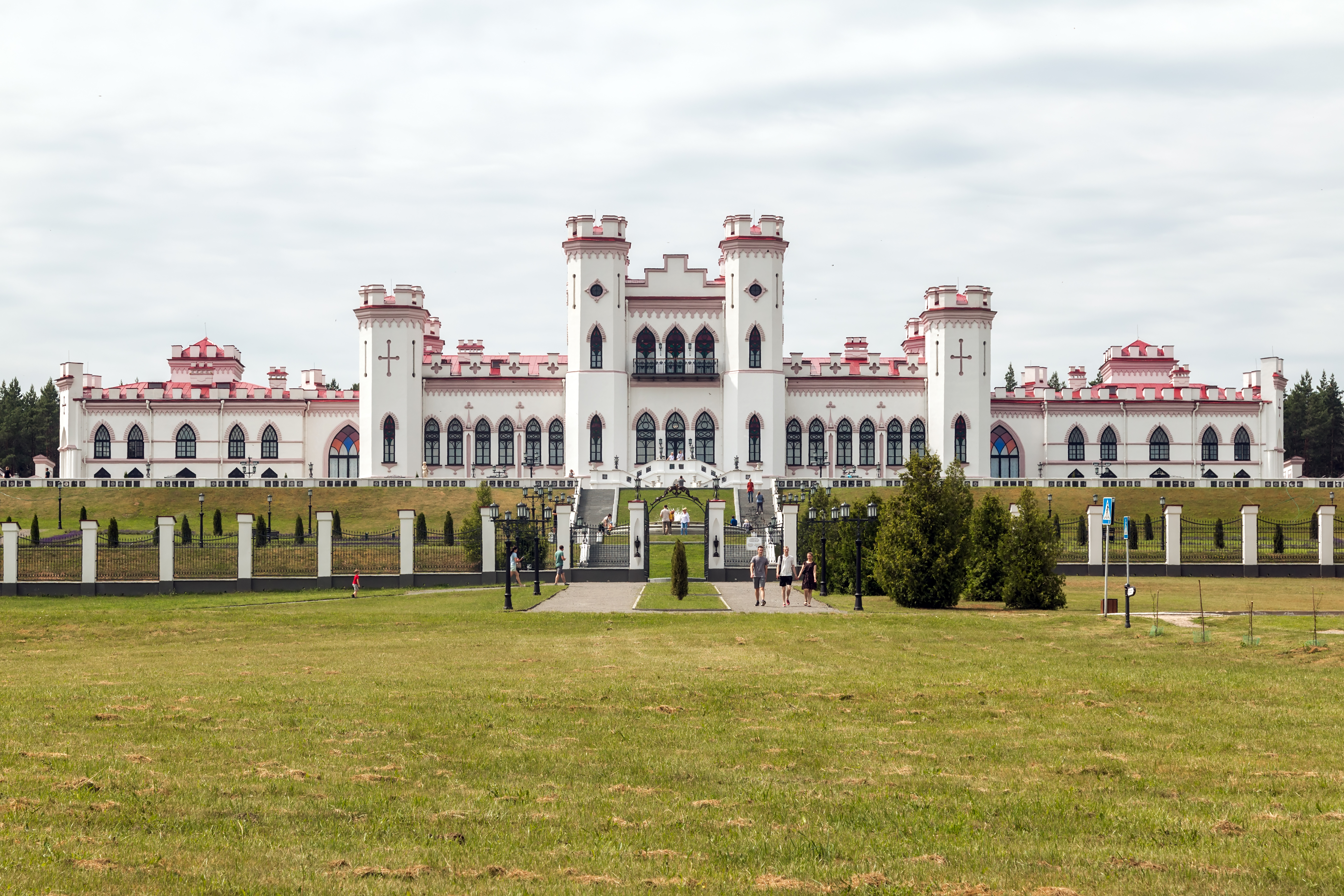
Kosava Castle

Kosava Castle is a ruined castellated palace in Gothic Revival style located in Kosava, Belarus. The estate was purchased in 1821 by Count Wojciech Puslowski. After Wojciech Puslowski the estate was inherited by his son Wandalin. Tadeusz Kościuszko was born in a manor house on the estate. The architect of the castle was Franciszek Jaszczołd. The palace was reconstructed by Władysław Marconi in the late 19th century. After the collapse of the Polish January Uprising in 1863, ownership was transferred to the Trubetskoy family and other Russian aristocrats.

During World War I and World War II, the place was severely damaged. Currently, the castle is in the process of restoration.

== Gallery ==
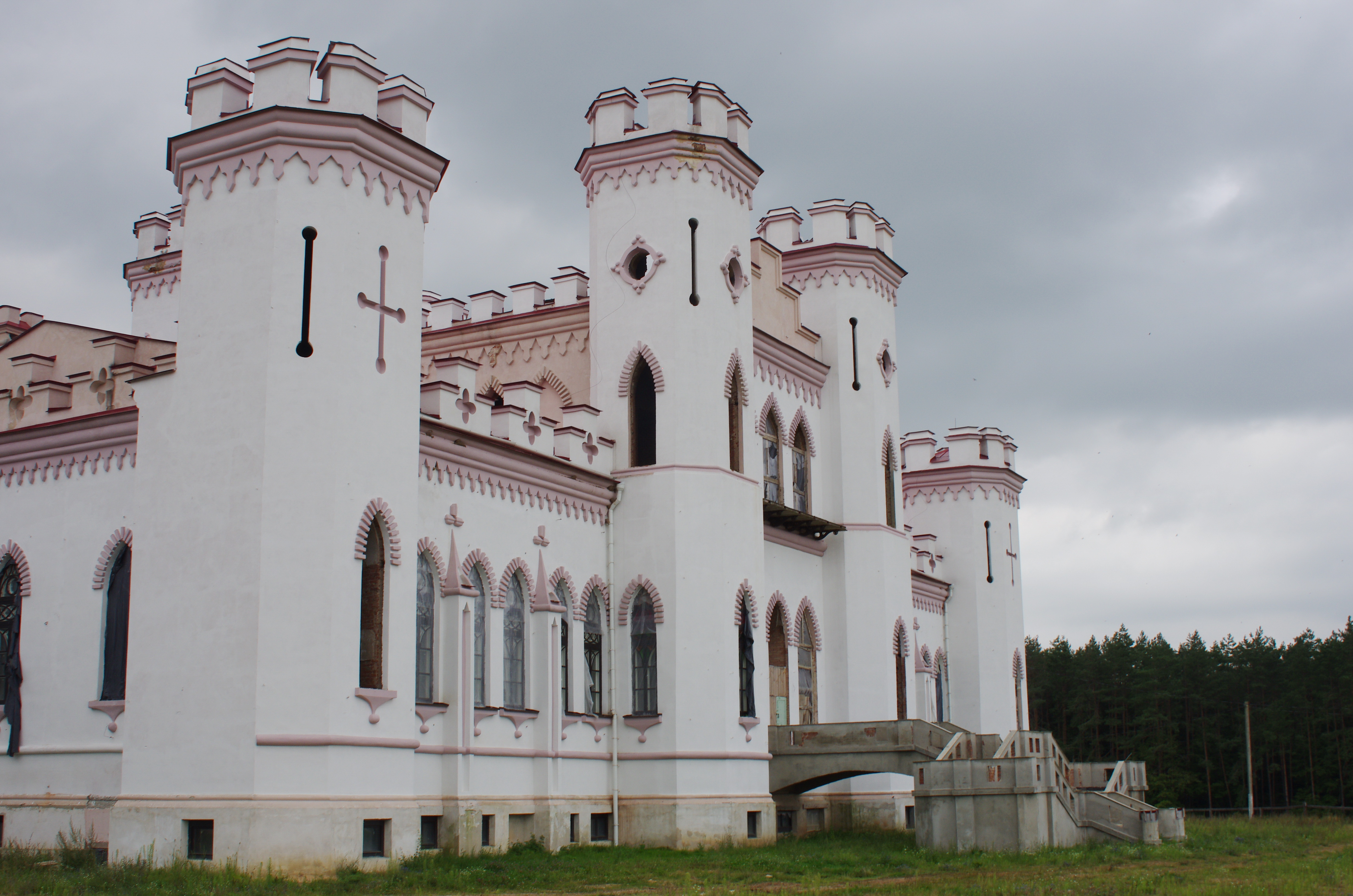
Kosava castle, 2016

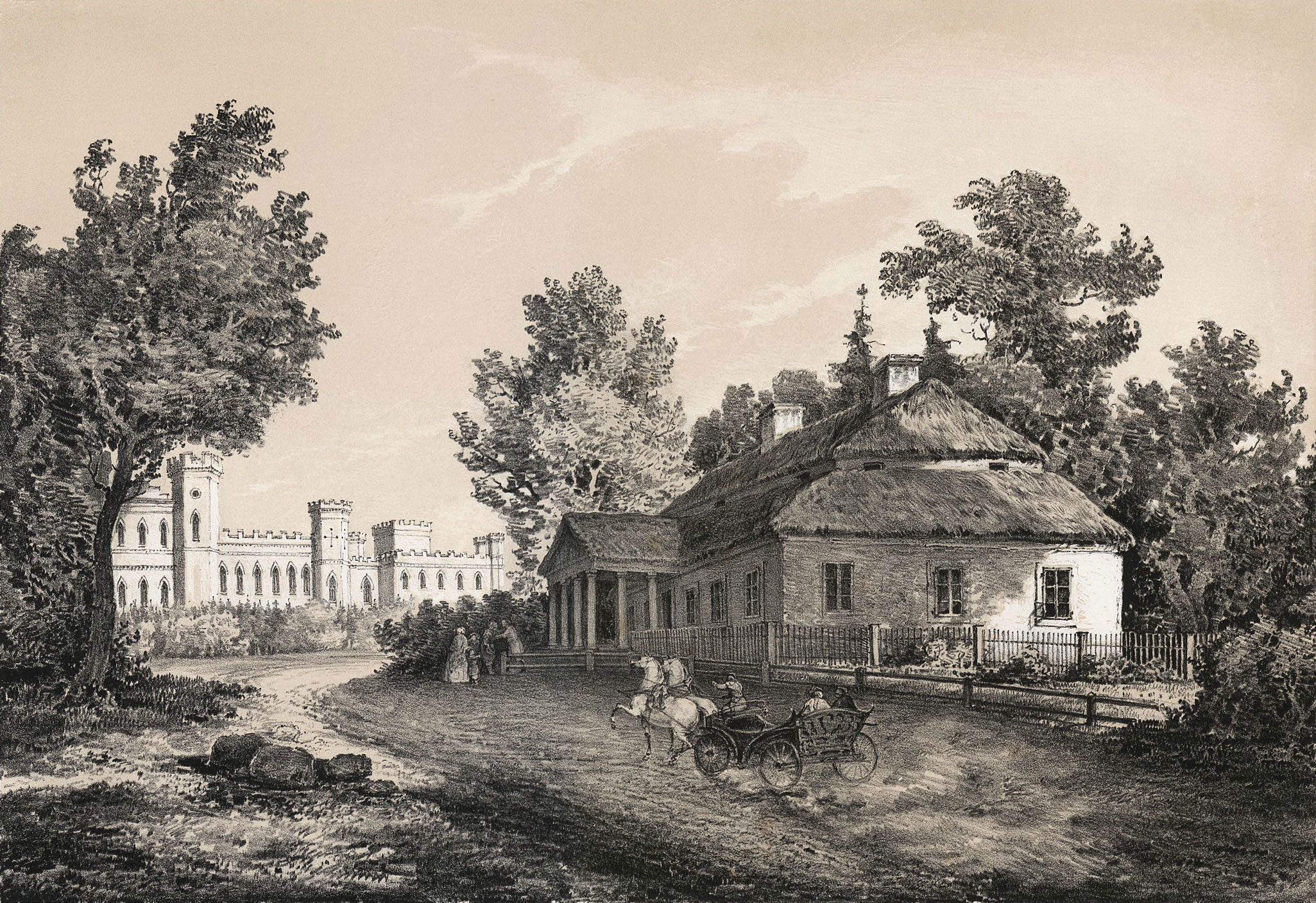
Napoleon Orda . The house of the Kościuszko family (late 19th century). In the background: Kosava castle

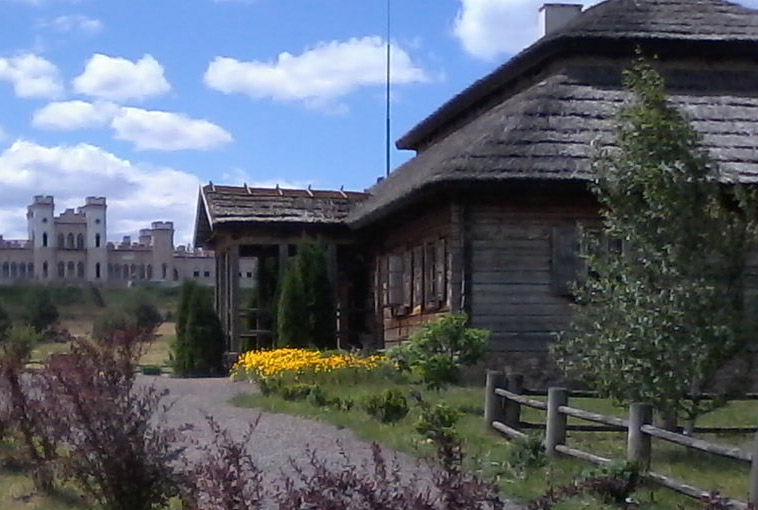
The Museum of Tadeusz Kościuszko in Mereczowszczyzna. In the background: Kosava castle in 2015

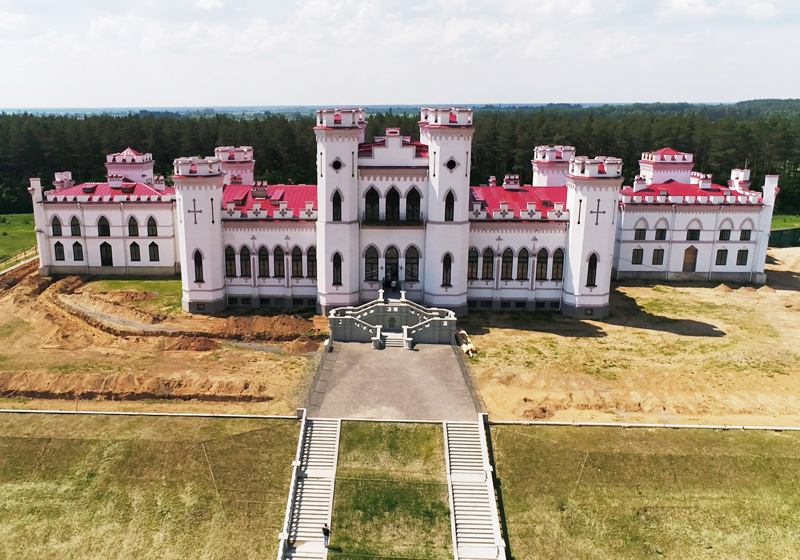
Castle after the main restoration, 2017-2018
