= Ivatsevichy =

Town in Brest Region, Belarus

Ivatsevichy Івацэвічы (Belarusian) Ивацевичи (Russian)
- Town
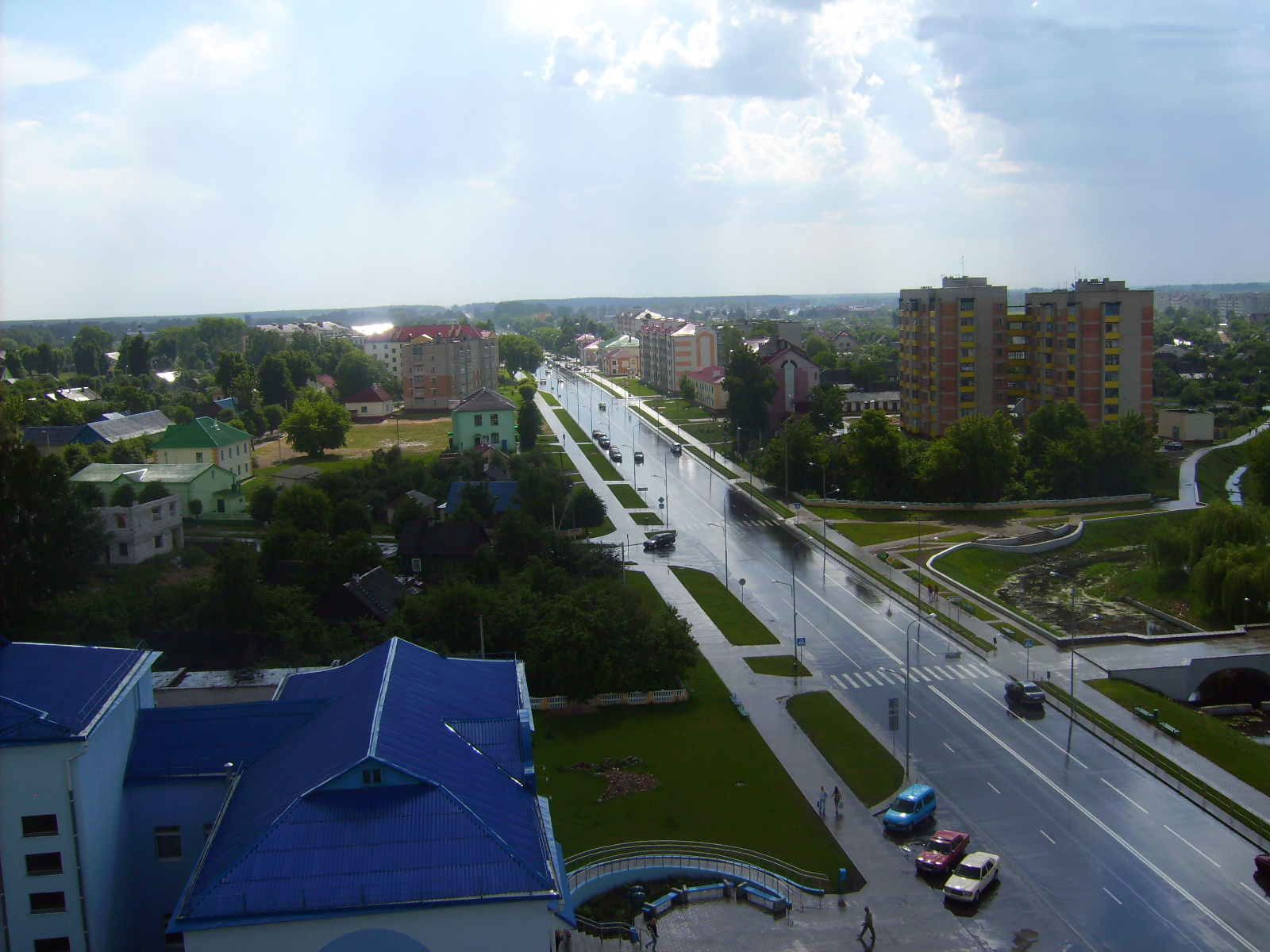

- Flag Coat of arms

- Location within Belarus
- Coordinates: 52°43′N 25°20′E
- Country: Belarus
- Region: Brest Region
- District: Ivatsevichy District
- First mentioned: 1508
- Elevation: 148 m (486 ft)

Population (2026)
  - Total: 22,189
- Time zone: UTC+3 (MSK)
- Postal code: 225295
- Area code: +375 1645
- License plate: 1
- Website: Official website (in Russian)

Ivatsevichy, or Ivatsevichi, (Note: Belarusian: Івацэвічы, romanized: Ivacevičy, locally: Вацэвічы; Russian: Ивацевичи, romanized: Ivatsevichi; Polish: Iwacewicze.) is a town in Brest Region, Belarus. It serves as the administrative center of Ivatsevichy District. As of 2026, it has a population of 22,189.

== History ==
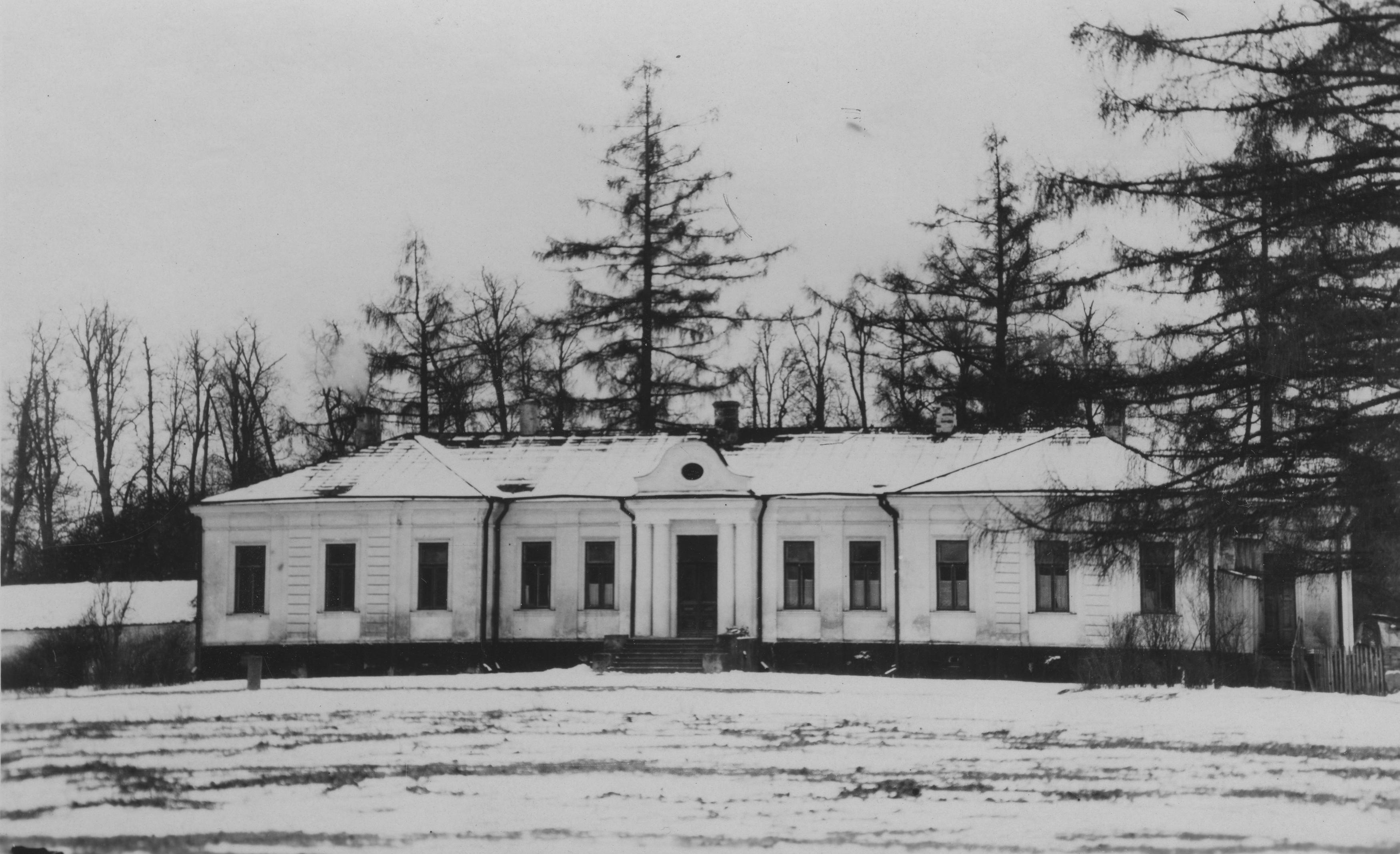
Jundziłł Manor in the interbellum

Within the Grand Duchy of Lithuania, Ivatsevitshy was part of Nowogródek Voivodeship. In 1795, the town was acquired by the Russian Empire in the course of the Third Partition of Poland

From 1921 until 1939, Ivatsevichy (Iwacewicze) was a provincial town in the Second Polish Republic, the seat of Kosów county with a population of around 1,500. It belonged to Polesie Voivodeship region of eastern Kresy, with a notable Jewish population.

During World War II, Ivatsevichy was occupied by the Red Army and, on 14 November 1939, incorporated into the Byelorussian SSR. The number of Jews in Ivatsevichy greatly increased due to influx of refugees from the Nazi-occupied western part of Poland.

Ivatsevichy was occupied by Nazi Germany from 24 June 1941 until 12 July 1944 and administered as a part of the Generalbezirk Weißruthenien of Reichskommissariat Ostland. The Nazis carried out mass executions of Jews at the Żwirownia gravel pit nearby. Under a strong German guard, Jews were marched out of town and separated into smaller groups. They were shot in waves over the already dug-out pits. Before 1944, the Nazis executed there more than a thousand innocent victims including prisoners of war. In 1941 soon after the Nazi takeover of Ivatsevichy, Ivatsevichy Ghetto was set up for about 600 Jews. They were fed starvation rations and forced to perform slave labor. On 14 March 1942 the ghetto was liquidated. All inmates were marched on foot to the Słonim Ghetto, and over the course of several months murdered there.

After the liberation, in Soviet Belarus the area of the mass graves in Ivatsevichy was used to extract sand. During mining, the bones of the dead were constantly being unearthed, until finally in the 1960s, a stone memorial was placed at the pits, marking the already mined graves.

Historical affiliations

Grand Duchy of Lithuania 1508–1569
Poland–Lithuania 1569–1795
Russian Empire 1795–1812
French occupation 1812
Russian Empire 1812–1915
German occupation 1915–1918
Second Polish Republic 1918–1919
SSR Byelorussia 1919
Second Polish Republic 1919–1939
Soviet Union 1939–1941
German occupation 1941–1944
Soviet Union 1944–1991
Belarus 1991–present

== Sports ==
The Belarusian football club FC Ivatsevichi is based here.

== Climate ==
Climate data for Ivatsevichy (1991–2020)
Month	Jan	Feb	Mar	Apr	May	Jun	Jul	Aug	Sep	Oct	Nov	Dec	Year
Record high °C (°F)	5.6 (42.1)	7.6 (45.7)	15.1 (59.2)	23.3 (73.9)	27.9 (82.2)	30.6 (87.1)	31.8 (89.2)	31.7 (89.1)	26.6 (79.9)	20.6 (69.1)	13.1 (55.6)	7.2 (45.0)	31.8 (89.2)
Mean daily maximum °C (°F)	−1.0 (30.2)	0.5 (32.9)	6.0 (42.8)	13.9 (57.0)	19.7 (67.5)	23.2 (73.8)	25.1 (77.2)	24.5 (76.1)	18.5 (65.3)	11.7 (53.1)	4.8 (40.6)	0.3 (32.5)	12.3 (54.1)
Daily mean °C (°F)	−3.3 (26.1)	−2.4 (27.7)	1.8 (35.2)	8.4 (47.1)	13.9 (57.0)	17.4 (63.3)	19.3 (66.7)	18.4 (65.1)	13.1 (55.6)	7.5 (45.5)	2.4 (36.3)	−1.7 (28.9)	7.9 (46.2)
Mean daily minimum °C (°F)	−5.6 (21.9)	−5.1 (22.8)	−1.8 (28.8)	3.2 (37.8)	8.1 (46.6)	12.0 (53.6)	13.9 (57.0)	12.8 (55.0)	8.3 (46.9)	3.8 (38.8)	0.2 (32.4)	−3.9 (25.0)	3.8 (38.8)
Record low °C (°F)	−18.9 (−2.0)	−16.4 (2.5)	−10.1 (13.8)	−3.5 (25.7)	0.8 (33.4)	5.9 (42.6)	8.7 (47.7)	6.8 (44.2)	0.7 (33.3)	−4.2 (24.4)	−8.7 (16.3)	−14.5 (5.9)	−18.9 (−2.0)
Average precipitation mm (inches)	39.8 (1.57)	34.8 (1.37)	36.1 (1.42)	41.7 (1.64)	69.0 (2.72)	64.4 (2.54)	90.3 (3.56)	59.9 (2.36)	53.6 (2.11)	44.2 (1.74)	45.9 (1.81)	45.9 (1.81)	625.6 (24.63)
Average precipitation days (≥ 1.0 mm)	9.0	7.9	7.6	7.1	8.7	7.9	9.4	7.2	6.8	7.0	8.5	9.4	96.5
Source: NOAA
