= List of translators and interpreters associations =

This is a list of notable translator and interpreter organizations (professional associations, not commercial translation agencies) around the world.

Most of them are International Federation of Translators members as well.

== Worldwide ==
- International Federation of Translators
- International Association of Professional Translators and Interpreters
- International Association of Conference Interpreters
- International Association for Translation and Intercultural Studies
- Translators Without Borders
- European Society for Translation Studies
- Tremédica
- World Association of Sign Language Interpreters
- AudioVisual Translators Europe

== Argentina ==
- Argentine Association of Technical-Scientific Translators (AATT)
- Argentine Association of Translators and Interpreters
- Federación Argentina de Traductores

== Australia ==
- Australian Institute of Interpreters and Translators

== Canada ==
- Association of Visual Language Interpreters of Canada
- Canadian Translators, Terminologists and Interpreters Council
- Literary Translators' Association of Canada
- At province level:
  - Ordre des traducteurs, terminologues et interprètes agréés du Québec

== China ==
- Translators Association of China

== Ethiopia ==
- Ethiopian Translators Association

== France ==
- Union Nationale des Experts Traducteurs Interprètes près les Cours d'Appel
- Association Française des Interprètes de Conférence Indépendants
- Société française des traducteurs
- Association des traducteurs et éditeurs en sciences sociales

== Japan ==
See List of Japanese interpreting and translation associations

== New Zealand ==
- New Zealand Society of Translators and Interpreters

== North Macedonia ==
- Macedonian Translators Association

== Norway ==
- Norwegian Association of Literary Translators
- Norwegian Association of Audiovisual Translators

== Poland ==
- [Polish Association of Conference Interpreters PSTK]]

== Portugal ==
- ATAV (Portuguese Audiovisual Translators Association)
- APTRAD (Portuguese Translators and Interpreters Association)
- APT (Portuguese Translators Association)

== Russia ==
- Union of Translators of Russia
- National League of Translators and Interpreters (Russia)

== South Africa ==
- South African Translators' Institute

== Spain ==
- Associations at a national level:
  - Asetrad (Spanish Association of Translators, Copy-editors, and Interpreters)
  - ATRAE (Spanish Association of Audiovisual Translators)
- Regional associations:
  - APTIC (Professional Association of Translators and Interpreters of Catalonia)
  - EIZIE (Association of Translators, Correctors and Interpreters of the Basque Language)

== Sweden ==
- The Swedish Association of Professional Translators and Authorised Interpreters (SFÖ–SAT

== United Kingdom ==
See List of UK interpreting and translation associations

== United States ==
- U.S.A. Translators Association (the U.S. A.T.A.), formerly the American Translators Society (ATS-US, established 1999)
- American Literary Translators Association
- American Translators Association
- National Association of Judiciary Interpreters and Translators
- Registry of Interpreters for the Deaf
- The American Association of Language Specialists
- There are several associations at regional, state and local level, such as:
  - Colorado Translators Association
  - Florida Registry of Interpreters for the Deaf
  - Midwest Association of Translators & Interpreters
  - Nevada Interpreters and Translators Association
  - New England Translators Association
  - New Mexico Translators & Interpreters Association
  - Northern California Translators Association
  - Northwest Translators and Interpreters Society
  - Northeast Ohio Translators Association
  - Community and Court Interpreters of Ohio
  - Chicago Area Translators and Interpreters Association

== Uruguay ==
- Colegio de Traductores Públicos del Uruguay
