= International Translation Day =

International observance, 30 September

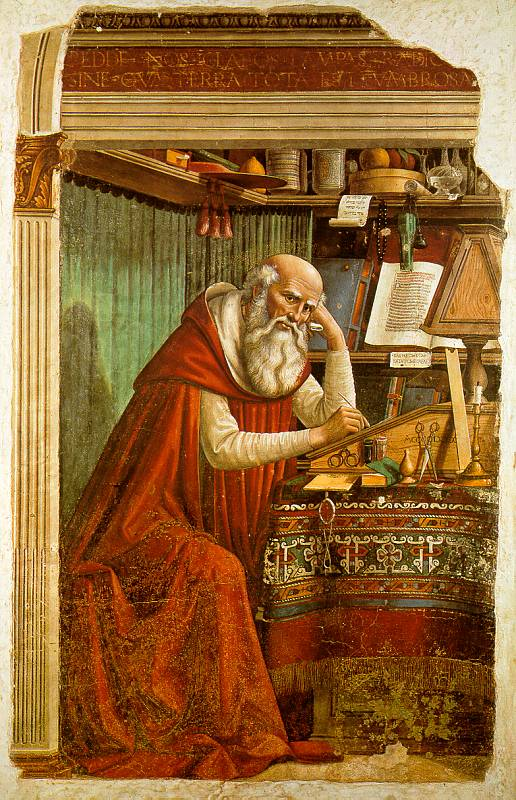
St. Jerome in his study. A painting by Domenico Ghirlandaio

International Translation Day is an international day recognising translation professionals. It is celebrated every year on 30 September, which is the day of the feast of St. Jerome, the Bible translator who is considered the patron saint of translators.

== United Nations resolution ==
On 24 May 2017, the United Nations General Assembly passed resolution 71/288 declaring September 30 International Translation Day, recognising the role of professional translation in connecting nations. The draft resolution A/71/L.68 was signed by eleven countries: Azerbaijan, Bangladesh, Belarus, Costa Rica, Cuba, Ecuador, Paraguay, Qatar, Turkey, Turkmenistan, and Vietnam. In addition to the International Federation of Translators, the adoption of the resolution was advocated for by several other organisations, including International Association of Conference Interpreters, Critical Link International, International Association of Professional Translators and Interpreters, Red T, World Association of Sign Language Interpreters.

The United Nations puts on an annual St. Jerome Translation Contest for translations in Arabic, Chinese, English, French, Russian, Spanish, and German.

== International Federation of Translators ==
The celebrations have been promoted by International Federation of Translators (FIT) since its establishment in 1953. In 1991, FIT launched the idea of an officially recognized International Translation Day to show solidarity with the worldwide translation community in an effort to promote translation as a profession that has become increasingly essential in the era of globalization.

== American Translators Association ==
Since 2018 the American Translators Association has celebrated International Translation Day by publishing a series of social media posts intended to spread information and educate the public about the role of professional translators and interpreters. The ATA celebrated ITD 2018 by releasing a set of six infographics that depict information about the professions. In 2019, ATA released a video depicting "A Day in the Life of a Translator or Interpreter".

== Themes ==
Each year, IFT chooses a theme for ITD:

- 2014−Language Rights: Essential to All Human Rights
- 2015−The Changing Face of Translating and Interpreting
- 2016−Translation and Interpreting: Connecting Worlds
- 2017−Translation and Diversity
- 2018−Translation: promoting cultural heritage in changing times
- 2019−Translation and Indigenous Languages during International Year of Indigenous Languages
- 2020−Finding the words for a world in crisis
- 2021−United in translation
- 2022−A World without Barriers: The Role of Language Professionals in Building Culture, Understanding and lasting Peace
- 2023− The role of language professionals
- 2024− Translation, an art worth protecting The Translators Associations they promote throughout Europe
- 2025− Translation, shaping a future you can trust
- 2026- Linguistic diversity and language rights

== See also ==
- Universal Declaration on Cultural Diversity
