= National League of Translators and Interpreters (Russia) =

- National League of Translators and Interpreters Non-Profit Partnership
- Национальная лига переводчиков
- Formation: 1 June 2004
- Founder: Yuriy Alekseyev
- Founded at: Moscow
- Registration no.: 1047796385086
- Legal status: Non-Profit Partnership
- Headquarters: Moscow
- Region served: Russia
- Fields: Translation & Interpretation
- Official language: Russian
- President: Vadim Vetrichenko
- Subsidiaries: St.Petersburg, Sochi chapters
- Website: https://www.russian-translators.ru/

National League of Translators and Interpreters (Russian: Национальная лига переводчиков) — a guild-type NGO of professional freelance translators and interpreters of Russia. The league was established in 2004 in Moscow as a Non-Profit Partnership (Russian: Некоммерческое партнёрство), having since developed sections in Saint-Petersburg and Sochi. The entity is cooperating with the Union of Translators of Russia on issues of importance for translation and language interpretation industry.

== Organizational structure ==
- General meeting of the members
- Board of the Partnership
  - President and Vice-president
  - Heads of Councils and Committees

=== President ===
- 2004-2014 — Mr. Yury M. Alekseev
- 2014-2023 — Mr. Nikolay K. Duplensky
- 2023-current — Mr. Vadim G. Vetrichenko

== Professional activities ==
- Organizing professional seminars, roundtables and symposia
- Taking part in developing standards and methodologic materials

== See also ==
- International Translation Day
- Category:Russian translators
