= Valentín García Yebra =

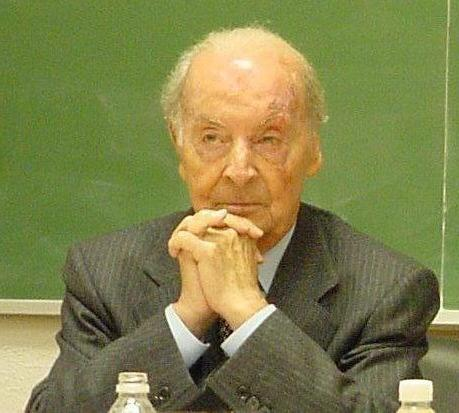
- Born: Valentín García Yebra; 28 April 1917; Ponferrada (León), Spain
- Died: 13 December 2010 (aged 93); Madrid, Spain

Seat n of the Real Academia Española
- In office 27 January 1985 – 13 December 2010
- Preceded by: Jesús Prados Arrarte
- Succeeded by: Carme Riera

Valentín García Yebra (28 April 1917, in Lombillo de Los Barrios, Ponferrada, León – 13 December 2010, in Madrid), was a Spanish philologist, translator and translation scholar.

== Biography ==
He studied Arts at Madrid where he graduated in Classical Philology (1944), then he got his doctoral degree with his thesis Las traducciones latinas de la metafísica de Aristóteles. After a long career as professor and scholar, in 1974 he boosted the creation of a Translation Institute at the Universidad Complutense, where he delivered lectures in Translation Theory.

During his career he was awarded several prizes, including the Spanish National Translation Award in 1998. From 1984 until his death he was a member of the Real Academia Española. In 1997 he joined the Academia Norteamericana de la Lengua Española.

== Honors ==
- Premio Nacional a la Obra de un Traductor (1998)
- Premio Nacional de Periodismo "Miguel Delibes" (2004) for his article "Desajustes gramaticales", published in ABC on 27 September 2004.
- Honorary member of Asetrad (2008)
- Honorary member of IAPTI (2009).

== Works ==
Editorial Gredos, founded by García Yebra with fellow students, was in charge of publishing most of his books:

=== Translation ===
- Aguiar e Silva, Vítor Manuel de, Teoría de la literatura (1996, 1st ed.). ISBN 84-249-0045-6
- Aristotle, Metafísica de Aristóteles (trilingual version), (1997, 2nd ed.). ISBN 84-249-2176-3
- ——, Poetics (trilingual version), (1992, 1st ed.). ISBN 84-249-1200-4
- Julius Caesar, Guerra de las Galias (1985/2001, 3 vol. bilingual edition)
- ——, Guerra de las Galias (1996/1999, 2 vol. with Latin notes)
- Cicero, De Amicitia, anotado (1987, 5th ed.). ISBN 84-249-3396-6
- Étienne Gilson, El realismo metódico (Encuentro Ediciones, S.A., 1997). ISBN 84-7490-460-9
- Oronzo Giordano, Religiosidad popular en la Alta Edad Media (1983, 1st ed.). ISBN 84-249-0340-4
- Gertrud von le Fort, Himnos a la iglesia (Encuentro Ediciones, S.A., 1995). ISBN 84-7490-357-2
- ——, El velo de Verónica (Encuentro Ediciones, S.A., 1998). ISBN 84-7490-499-4
- Charles Möeller, Literatura del siglo XX y cristianismo (6 vol.). ISBN 84-249-3337-0
- Friedrich Schleiermacher, Sobre los diferentes métodos de traducir (2000). ISBN 84-249-2272-7
- Lucius Annaeus Seneca, Medea (1982, 2nd ed./2001, 3rd ed.). ISBN 84-249-0330-7/ISBN 84-249-2311-1

=== Grammar and translation theory ===
- "Traducción y estilo", comunicación presentada al X Congreso Internacional de Lingüistas celebrado en Bucarest del 28 de agosto al 2 de septiembre de 1967
- Traducción y enriquecimiento de la lengua del traductor (1985 R.A.E./2004 Gredos). ISBN 84-249-2712-5
- Claudicación en el uso de preposiciones (1988). ISBN 84-249-1277-2
- En torno a la Traducción. Teoría. Crítica. Historia (1989, 2.ª ed.). ISBN 84-249-0895-3
- Traducción: Historia y Teoría (1994). ISBN 84-249-1653-0
- Teoría y Práctica de la Traducción (2 volúmenes), (1997, 3.ª ed. revisada). ISBN 84-249-1840-1
- Diccionario de galicismos prosódicos y morfológicos (1999). ISBN 84-249-1999-8
- Documentación, terminología y traducción (Editorial Síntesis, S.A., 2000, 1ª. edic., 2ª. impres.). ISBN 84-7738-748-6
- El buen uso de las palabras (2009). ISBN 978-84-249-3607-5
- Gonzalo García, Consuelo, et al., Manual de documentación para la traducción literaria (Arco Libros, S.L., 2005). ISBN 84-7635-600-5
- Experiencias de un traductor (2006). ISBN 84-249-2799-0
