= Mexican Translators Association =

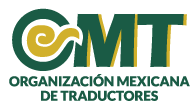
The OMT logo

The Mexican Translators Association (Organización Mexicana de Traductores; OMT) is a non-profit organization established in 1992 to promote professionalism in translating and interpreting. The current headquarters are at the Western Chapter, located in Guadalajara, Jalisco.

As a member of the Latin American Regional Center (CRAL), and the North American Regional Center (CRNA), the OMT has gained international presence and esteem.

The Western Chapter of the Mexican Translators Association is an excellent forum and meeting place for translators and interpreters in Mexico. It offers courses and workshops, continuing education opportunities and a place for colleagues to exchange ideas and opinions. One of its most important purposes is to provide translators and interpreters with opportunities to participate in the recognition of the professions, both in the labor market and with the general public.

The current chairwoman of the organization is Michèle Cecilia Arriola de la Mora.

== Origin and History ==
In 1992, the Mexican Translators Association was established in Mexico City. Years later, due to growth of translation and interpreting across the country, other chapters of the OMT began to emerge, one of which was the Western Chapter.

The Western Chapter began thanks to a group of experienced translators who started organizing informal get-togethers in Guadalajara, Jalisco. As time passed, this group of translators saw a need to expand. To do this, they began forming a network of professional contacts by establishing ties with the director of the Master's Program in Translation and Interpretation at the Universidad Autónoma de Guadalajara (which was established in 1995), as well as organizing seminars to discuss subjects related to translation, among other activities.

In 1999, when deciding how to officially organize, the group of translators decided to associate with the Mexican Translators Association in Mexico City. This was how the translators in Guadalajara established a chapter of the national association. As of 2004, there were four chapters of the OMT: the Central Chapter (Mexico City), Puebla Chapter, the Villahermosa Chapter, the Western Chapter (with main offices in Guadalajara, Jalisco).

Due to various challenges that arose in some chapters towards the end of this same year (2004), the Villahermosa and Puebla chapters were dissolved, and it was decided that the president would move to the Western Chapter. The Central Chapter in Mexico City also closed its doors later that year, leaving the Western Chapter as the only active seat in the OMT.

== Mission ==
Upon its establishment as part of a national association, the Western Chapter set out the following specific objectives:

- To promote the professional image of translators and interpreters. (The Western Chapter also included the figure of the interpreter in its articles of association, in addition to translators.)
- To promote and provide a space for the exchange of knowledge between translators and interpreters.
- To establish and promote quality and ethical standards.
- To serve as a reference in the realm of education and research in translating and interpreting.

== Significant endeavors (1996-present) ==
=== St. Jerome International Translation and Interpreting Conference ===
In September 1996, a group of colleagues that would later form the Western Chapter of the Mexican Translators Association got together to celebrate International Translation Day at a restaurant. Twenty years later, this meeting has become an annual conference that brings together 250 language professionals to attend workshops, presentations and roundtable events given by speakers willing to share their points of view, experience and specialized knowledge in the field of translating and interpreting.

Thanks to the support of various educational institutions throughout the years, the conference has become a forum where interpreters and translators can meet to update and hone their skills while reflecting on cultural and practical issues relating to their professional field.

Since 2007, the Guadalajara International Book Fair (FIL) has included the conference as part of their activities for professionals, and thanks to this, the conference is also able to offer more opportunities to network and explore the field of translating by taking part in other activities organized by the FIL.

=== Educational Offering in Translating and Interpreting ===
One of the main objectives of the Western Chapter has been to promote the specialized training of translators and interpreters.

In pursuit of this, it offers two certificate courses: English to Spanish Translation and English to Spanish Legal Translation. The latter is officially recognized by Mexico's Secretariat of Public Education and offers an online version for members and students who are interested in the course but do not live in Guadalajara. At one time, the organization also offered a course in French, but it was canceled due to a lack of students.

In addition, members also organize workshops and courses related to topics on translation, including translator tools (word processing programs, Wordfast, MemoQ), audiovisual translation, literary translation, pharmaceutical translation, consecutive and simultaneous interpreting, among a wide variety of subjects that arise from the need to remain competitive as professionals, among other reasons.

=== Relationships with academic institutions ===
Since 2002, the Western Chapter of the Mexican Translators Association has established relationships with universities and educational institutions with the Monterrey Institute of Technology, Leon Campus, the Angloamericano University Center, the Universidad Autónoma de Guadalajara, and others throughout Mexico.

=== Publications ===
Among its endeavors, another important goal at the Mexican Translators Association is to spread knowledge about translation and interpreting through publications and published a magazine in Puebla until 2003.

== Presidents ==
- Michèle Cecilia Arriola de la Mora (present)
- Elsy Anaí Villegas Carvallo
- Irma Amador García
- Jennifer Jane Nielsen
- Martha Schmidhuber Peña
- Michelle Bardales Martínez
- Salvador Virgen Aguilar
- Hermelinda González Gómez
- Teresa Ramírez Inzunza
- Esteban Cadena Chávez
- Guadalupe Sánchez

== Certification ==
Translator Certification Professional institutions, like the American Translators Association, offer certification by passing an exam that allows translators to demonstrate the quality of their translations. The OMT hosts the ATA exam held to certify English/Spanish translators (or vice versa) every two or three years, and it is generally scheduled during July or August.
