= Conference Interpreters Association of Turkey =

Professional association of conference interpreters in Turkey

- Türkiye Konferans Tercümanları Derneği
- Abbreviation: TKTD
- Formation: 1969
- Founded at: Istanbul, Turkey
- Type: Professional association
- Purpose: Professional standards and development of conference interpreting
- Headquarters: Istanbul, Turkey
- Region served: Turkey
- Website: www.tktd.org/en/
- Formerly called: Conference Interpreters' Association (KTD); United Conference Interpreters Association (BKTD)

The Conference Interpreters Association of Turkey (Turkish: Türkiye Konferans Tercümanları Derneği; TKTD), also styled the Conference Interpreters Association of Türkiye, is a professional association representing conference interpreters in Turkey. It was founded in Istanbul in 1969 as the Konferans Tercümanları Derneği (KTD; Conference Interpreters' Association).

== History ==
The association emerged during the institutional development of professional conference interpreting in Turkey. According to translation scholar Lale Arslan Özcan, a group of professional interpreters working with the Economic and Social Studies Conference Board left the organization in 1969 and established the Konferans Tercümanları Derneği. The group included Hasan Akbelen, Zeynep Bekdik, Asaf Savaş Akad, Melik Furgaç and Ömer Bozkurt.

The organization sought to establish professional principles and working practices for conference interpreting and to introduce international professional norms in Turkey. It also selected and trained prospective interpreters and maintained links with international conference-interpreting practice.

In 1998, the association broadened its membership and changed its name to the United Conference Interpreters Association (Turkish: Birleşik Konferans Tercümanları Derneği, BKTD). In 2009 it applied to the Turkish Ministry of the Interior for permission to use "Turkey" in its name. Following approval, it adopted the name Türkiye Konferans Tercümanları Derneği in April 2010. A later study on the history of conference interpreting in Turkey also identifies the association, founded with twenty members in Istanbul in 1969, as continuing its representative activities under its present name from 2010 onward.

== Activities ==
TKTD works on professional standards, ethics, working conditions and training in conference interpreting. According to the association, its purpose is to promote conference interpreting as a profession and to establish professional principles in line with international practice.

The association has also developed principles concerning university-level conference interpreter training, including aptitude testing, practical interpreting instruction, professional ethics and instructor qualifications.

In June 2026, the Turkish Ministry of Foreign Affairs listed membership in TKTD or the International Association of Conference Interpreters (AIIC), as well as accreditation by certain international institutions, among the professional credentials that could be used to document qualification for its conference-interpreter roster. The ministry described TKTD and AIIC as professional organizations regarded as professional references in conference interpreting.

== 50th anniversary ==
In 2019, the association marked its 50th anniversary with the publication of Bu Kulaklar Neler Duydu: Türkiye'de Konferans Çevirmenliğinin 50 Yılı (What These Ears Have Heard: 50 Years of Conference Interpreting in Turkey). The book, prepared by documentary filmmaker Somnur Vardar, was based on interviews with 35 conference interpreters representing three generations and presented the development of the profession alongside events in Turkey's recent history.

== See also ==
- Conference interpreting
- Simultaneous interpretation
- International Association of Conference Interpreters
- Interpreting
