= Canadian Translators, Terminologists and Interpreters Council =

- Abbreviation: CTTIC
- Type: Organizations based in Canada
- Legal status: active
- Purpose: advocate and public voice, educator and network
- Headquarters: Ottawa, Ontario
- Region served: Canada
- Official language: English, French
- Website: www.cttic.org

The Canadian Translators, Terminologists and Interpreters Council (CTTIC) (or, in French, the Conseil des traducteurs, terminologues et interprètes du Canada) is a federation of provincial and territorial associations representing translators, terminologists and interpreters (collectively known as "language professionals") in Canada.

Since professional organization is a matter of provincial and territorial jurisdiction in Canada, CTTIC admits only provincial and territorial bodies, called associations, orders, societies or corporations. The council's total membership consists of the eleven member bodies which, in turn, represent their own members.

As a result, the CTTIC speaks for about 3,500 language professionals, some 2,500 of whom are certified.

The CTTIC is no longer affiliated with the International Federation of Translators (FIT).

== History ==
The council was originally incorporated in 1956 as the Society of Translators and Interpreters of Canada (STIC), or, in French, the Société des traducteurs et interprètes du Canada (STIC). It changed its name, becoming CTIC (the Canadian Translators and Interpreters Council, or, in French the Conseil des traducteurs et interprètes du Canada) in 1970. The Association of Translators and Interpreters of Ontario (ATIO) and the Ordre des traducteurs, terminologues et interprètes agréés du Québec (OTTIAQ) (known, at that time, as the Société des traducteurs du Québec (STQ)), are the founding members of the council.

On June 11, 2012, OTTIAQ withdrew from CTTIC.

== Member Associations ==
Original members:

- Association of Translators and Interpreters of Ontario
- Ordre des traducteurs, terminologues et interprètes agréés du Québec (member until June 11, 2012)

Since 1972 the following associations have joined:

- Association of Translators and Interpreters of Alberta (ATIA)
- Association of Translators and Interpreters of Manitoba (ATIM)
- Association of Translators and Interpreters of Nova Scotia (ATINS)
- Association of Translators and Interpreters of Saskatchewan (ATIS)
- Association of Visual Language Interpreters of Canada (AVLIC)
- Corporation of Translators, Terminologists and Interpreters of New Brunswick (CTINB)
- Interpreters/Translators Society of the Northwest Territories (ITSNWT)
- Nunavut Interpreter/Translator Society
- Society of Interpreters and Translators of Yukon (SITY)
- Society of Translators and Interpreters of British Columbia (STIBC)

== See also ==
- International Federation of Translators
