= Ordre des traducteurs, terminologues et interprètes agréés du Québec =

The Ordre des traducteurs, terminologues et interprètes agréés du Québec (OTTIAQ) is a professional order representing translators, terminologists and interpreters in Quebec. As a professional order, the OTTIAQ provides its members with a "reserved title": Certified Translator (C. Tr.), or, in French, traducteur agréé (trad. a.); Certified Terminologist (C. Term.), or, in French, terminologue agréé (term. a.); and Certified Interpreter (C. Int.), or, in French, interprète agréé (int. a.).

OTTIAQ's goals include providing information and training for members, and thereby promoting the advancement and raising the profile of the three professions of its members.

== History ==
OTTIAQ can trace its history back to 1940, when the Société des traducteurs du Québec (STQ) was founded (letters patent granted in 1943), making it the oldest association of its type in the province.

In 1968 the STQ merged with the Cercle des traducteurs and the Corporation des traducteurs professionnels du Québec. On April 1, 1992 the STQ became the Corporation professionnelle des traducteurs et interprètes agréés du Québec (CPTIAQ) and on October 15, 1994, in compliance with the Act to amend the Professional Code and other Acts respecting the professions, the Corporation changed its name to the Ordre des traducteurs et interprètes agréés du Québec (OTIAQ).

On July 12, 2000 the National Assembly of Quebec unanimously approved the addition of the title "terminologues" to its name and OTIAQ officially became the Ordre des traducteurs, terminologues et interprètes agréés du Québec. On September 11, 2000 the Board adopted a resolution approving the modified acronym, OTTIAQ.

On June 11, 2012, OTTIAQ withdrew from the Canadian Translators, Terminologists and Interpreters Council.

== See also ==
- International Federation of Translators
