= Professional Association of Translators and Interpreters of Catalonia =

Independent non-profit association of translators and interpreters

- Associació Professional de Traductors i Intèrprets de Catalunya
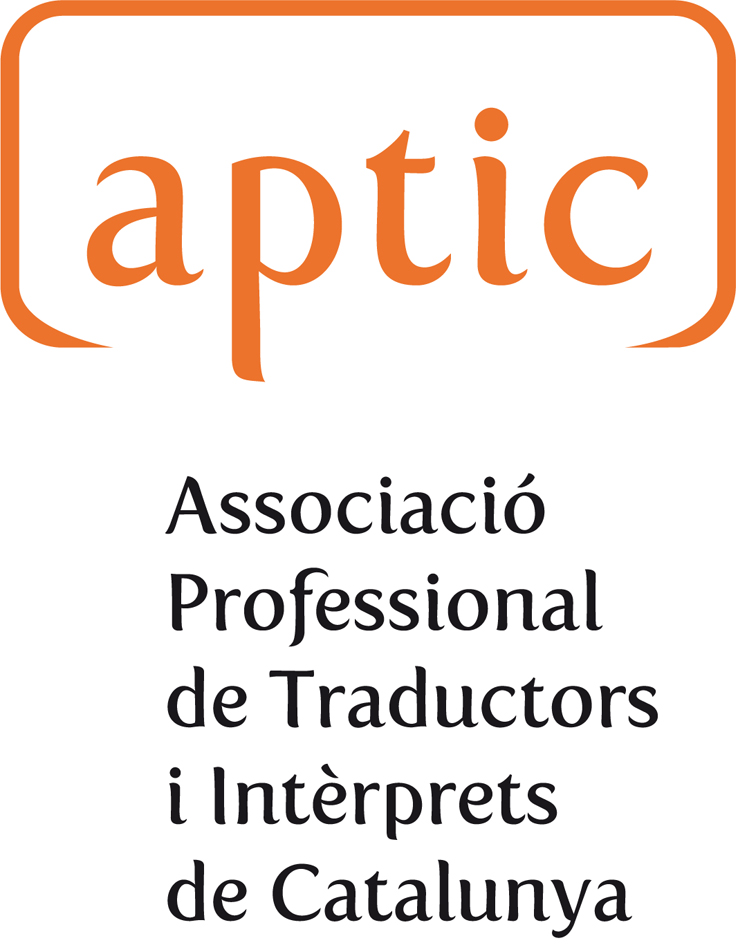
- Abbreviation: APTIC
- Formation: 01/01/2009
- Location: C. Llull 63 2n 7a Barcelona
- Website: www.aptic.cat

The Associació Professional de Traductors i Intèrprets de Catalunya (APTIC) (in English, Professional Association of Translators and Interpreters of Catalonia) is an independent, non-profit association. It was officially established on January 1, 2009, and is open to all professionals from the sector who are academically trained or professionally active. APTIC is a member of the International Federation of Translators (FIT) and the Red Vértice. With over 650 members, APTIC has over twenty years’ experience representing and defending translators and interpreters. It also organizes training and promotional activities for the sector's professionals.

APTIC was founded by the merging of two of Catalonia's specialized translator and interpreter associations: l’Associació de Traductors i d’Intèrprets de Catalunya (ATIC) (Association of Translators and Interpreters of Catalonia) and Traductors i Intèrprets Associats pro-Col·legi (TRIAC) (Associated Translators and Interpreters Professional Body). ATIC was founded in 1994 by a group of translation students wishing to address the lack of legislation and organization specific to the translation profession. TRIAC was born a year later; its main objective was to create an official body of translators and interpreters to help regulate the profession in Catalonia.

Both associations operated separately for ten years. In 2006, however, the law on practicing professions requiring academic degrees and professional bodies was introduced, which removed the option to create an official body of translators and interpreters. At that time, ATIC and TRIAC shared the same objectives and they started working toward the future union.
