= Argentine Association of Translators and Interpreters =

The Argentine Association of Translators and Interpreters (Spanish: Asociación Argentina de Traductores e Intérpretes, AATI) is an Argentine translation association. It is a member of the International Federation of Translators (FIT-IFT).

AATI is a nonprofit organization with more than 40 years of history. With a base of more than 600 members active in a range of translation and interpreting fields and language combinations, AATI represents language professionals residing in Argentina and abroad.

Its mission is to protect and represent the interests of literary, scientific and technical translators and interpreters; to promote professional development; to encourage cooperation and knowledge-sharing with other professional and educational associations, and to disseminate translation and interpreting news and related activities.

Its activities include organizing CE courses and seminars based on the new ICTs; actively engaging in forums and events advocating for the profession; offering an online translator and interpreter search tool and directory, and providing members with a job posting service, professional advice, and a monthly newsletter. It also hosts an active Sign Language Division.
