= South African Translators' Institute =

- Founded: 25 August 1956
- Type: Trade association
- Members: 800
- Website: www.translators.org.za

The South African Translators' Institute (SATI) is the largest association in South Africa representing professional, academic and amateur translators and other language practitioners. Membership is open to anyone.

SATI was founded in 1956. In 2012 there were around 800 members.

The institute has adopted official names in South Africa's other official languages, namely (Afrikaans: Suid-Afrikaanse Vertalersinstituut, SAVI, Zulu: INhlangano yaBahumushi yaseNingizimu Afrika, Xhosa: Umbutho wabaGuquli wazeMzantsi Afrika, Sotho: Mokgatlo wa Bafetoledi wa Afrika Borwa, Northern Sotho: Sehlongwa sa Bafetoledi sa Afrika Borwa, Tswana: Mokgatlho wa Baranodi wa Aforika Borwa, Tsonga: Vandla ra Vahundzuluxi ra Afrika Dzonga, Swazi: Inhlangano Yebahumushi YaseNingizimu Afrika, Venda: Tshiimiswa tsha Vhapinduleli tsha Afurika Tshipembe, and Southern Ndebele: IHlangano yabaTjhugululi yeSewula Afrika).

== Purpose ==
SATI's purpose is to promote the interests of the translation profession in South Africa, chiefly through:

- undertaking, promoting and/or publishing research
- publishing a journal and various language and translation guides
- enforcing a code of ethics for translators
- co-operating with other organisations and institutions to promote the profession
- lobbying for proper training facilities for translators
- at some future date, limiting membership to those who had passed an examination

Other developments through which SATI contributes to translation in South Africa, include:

- administering a system of accreditation based on set examinations
- granting bursaries to students of translation each year
- awarding a cash prize for outstanding translation in various fields every three years
- maintaining a database of freelance translators, interpreters and editors, which is accessible to the public
- representing South African interests internationally as a member of the International Federation of Translators (FIT)

== Industry recognition ==
Recognition for SATI in the translation industry in South Africa is sporadic, and SATI accreditation has no official recognition in South African law. However, some government departments prefer to employ SATI accreditees, e.g., certain metropolitan city councils and the police, and a few government departments even pay their employees' SATI membership fees. SATI's freelance tariffs have been used in some legislation as a yardstick.

== Membership ==
Membership is open to anyone from any country in any profession, though most members are South Africans who are translators. There are about 800 members.

The only requirement for membership is that new members agree to adhere to SATI's code of ethics and pay an annual membership fee (R845 in 2019). There are no membership examinations, although introduction of such examinations has been an ideal since the founding of the institute.

== Code of ethics ==
The fifteen tenets of the SATI code of ethics are as follows:

All members of SATI shall:

- aim for best quality of text interpretation, terminology use, spelling and grammar, and tone and register
- accept full responsibility for their translations
- inform their clients of unresolved problems
- accept only work which they are capable of doing (although translators may accept work that they are incapable of doing if their clients have been made aware of the fact)
- deliver their work by the deadline and in the form agreed upon with the client
- constantly pursue self-improvement
- share professional know-how with other members
- treat as confidential all new information about their clients and work done for them
- accept no work that is for unlawful or dishonest purposes
- accept no work that is contrary to public interest
- not charge excessive rates
- respect copyright and author rights
- practise high ethical and moral standards when dealing with clients and colleagues
- participate in the activities of the Institute
- always behave and translate in a manner that advances the interests of the Institute and the profession

== Accreditation ==
SATI offers an accreditation examination to members and has done so since 1990. In 2011, some 240 of its 800 members were accredited. Several members were accredited in more than one trade or language, and there were 390 accreditations.

Members of SATI are encouraged to gain accreditation, but it is not required for membership. Accreditation is, however, required of members of the SATI executive committee and the executive committees of both formal and informal chapters of the institute. Formal chapters are required to have a certain minimum number of accredited members. Only accredited members are allowed to vote at SATI's annual general meeting.

Corporate members who adhere to specific requirements set by the Institute may also become accredited.

=== Types of accreditation ===
SATI offers accreditation for general translation, sworn translation, language editing, simultaneous interpreting, and terminology in various combinations of South Africa's 11 official languages and some non-South African languages such as Dutch, French, German, Italian, Portuguese and Spanish.

| Type of accreditation | Number of members (2019) |
|---|---|
| Simultaneous interpreting | 57 |
| Language editing | 43 |
| Terminology | 3 |
| Translation: from Afrikaans to English | 20 |
| Translation: from English to Afrikaans | 41 |
| Translation: between English and Afrikaans | 27 |
| Translation: other languages | 40 |
| Sworn translation | 16 |
| TOTAL (accredited members) | 217 |

SATI has an agreement with the National Accreditation Authority for Translators and Interpreters in Australia (NAATI) regarding translation accreditation in other languages that are not as common in South Africa.

=== The examinations ===
Candidates taking the translation, editing and terminology examinations are given 24 hours to complete a number of texts at their own premises. During this 24-hour period they are not allowed to contact other humans. The product of the exam must be entirely their own (no external editors, proofreaders, etc.). To counteract the possibility of cheating, the translators' exams are particularly difficult, and the specific preferences of examiners are not made known to candidates. The exam papers typically include a literary piece, an academic piece, and a choice from certain broad technical fields.

The examination papers are marked independently by two examiners. In cases where one examiner passes and the other fails the candidate, a third examiner is appointed, with the view to a 2/3 ruling.

The interpreter examinations are held once or twice a year at different centres across the country, depending on demand. Interpreter accreditation is also available for South African Sign Language.

Members who fail an examination must wait 12 months before attempting the exam again. A list of current accreditees are available on the institute's web site.

== Structure ==
The institute is run by an executive comprising a chairperson, vice-chairperson, secretary, registrar and treasurer.

The following committees have also been set up to guide the institute's activities: Accreditation and Ethics.

SATI office-bearers and committee members work on a voluntary basis. Members of the executive are elected at an annual general meeting for a period of three years.

Members of SATI may establish regional and subject-specific chapters. There are a number of chapters: Western Cape, Eastern Cape, KZN, Free State & Northern Cape, Northwest and Emerging Practitioners.

== Publications ==
Publications produced by the Institute are the Sworn Translation manual (guide to the practice of sworn translation in South Africa), and Bridging Language Barriers: SATI – The First Fifty Years (a history of the institute).

== Coat of arms ==
In 1979 MAY, SATI applied for and registered a coat of arms at the South African State Herald.
