= Union of Translators of Russia =

Professional union

Union of Translators of Russia (UTR) is a professional union of the translators, interpreters, teachers of translation and specialists in different genres and spheres of translation and interpreting.

UTR branches work in many regions of Russia (Astrakhan, Vladivostok, Volgograd, Voronezh, Ekaterinburg, Nizhni Tagil, Ivanovo, Irkutsk, Kazan, Kaliningrad, Kaluga, Krasnodar, Novorossisk, Sochi, Moscow, Moscow Region, Nizhni Novgorod, Novosibirsk, Orenburg, Perm, Ryazan, Rostov-on-Don, Samara, St. Petersburg, Saransk, Saratov, Smolensk, Stavropol, Tomsk, Tula (Russia), Ulyanovsk, Ufa, Khabarovsk, Chita, Yakutsk). UTR is a member of International Federation of Translators (FIT).
