= Interpreting notes =

Interpreters' working notes

Interpreting notes are used by some interpreters, who re-express oral communications (such as speeches) in whole or in part. Such notes may be used when the interpreter is working in "consecutive mode."

Interpreting notes are not part of any conventional graphic system, and practitioners are free to develop their own techniques. However, some basic rules facilitate the recording of details in order to aid the interpreter in coping with large amounts of information.

== Theory ==
The purpose of interpreting notes is not to transcribe the speech verbatim. Interpreting notes are not a form of shorthand. Their purpose is to write minimal notes which will, at a quick glance, elicit in the interpreter's mind the intent of an oral communication so that it can be re-expressed in a different language.

It is not appropriate to document a speech in shorthand, as this would result in task duplication.

== Practice ==
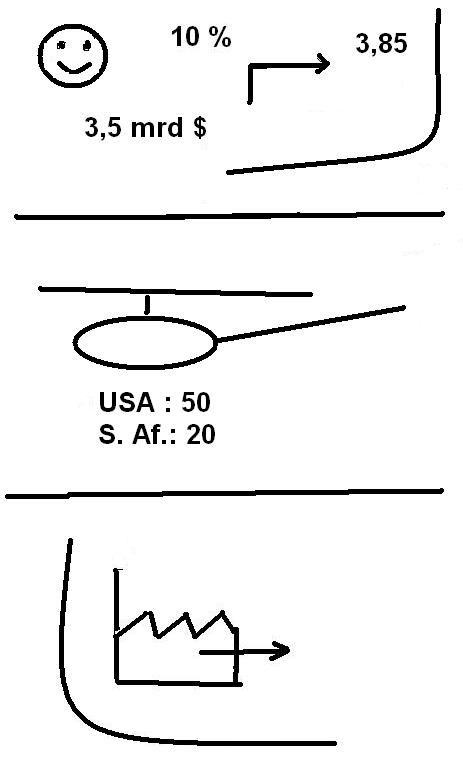
Typical interpreting notes.

The interpreter listens to the speaker and writes only that information which the interpreter judges sufficient to render the meaning. Numbers, names, and the titles of persons are retained in the interpretation.

Interpreting notes are typically written in a notebook with each note being separated from the others by a horizontal line. After interpreting a sentence with the aid of a note, some interpreters might make a slash over it, if they have the time. This has an important psychological effect — it is similar to erasing data on a computer. Others might consider it too time-consuming to do so when a fast pace of interpretation is required or they might think that it detracts from the pace of their delivery.

The interpreter deciphers the notes and expresses their content in the target language. Following analysis of the speech, the interpreter may write the information in abstract form.

=== Ideograms ===
Ideograms are an important tool used by interpreters. For example, the letter “E” laid on its side (like the Cyrillic letter sha, Ш) may represent Europe. Then one can specify whether eastern, western, or central Europe is meant by slashing the relevant upward leg. A horizontal bar with two vertical bars beneath it might represent a table, which would indicate a meeting or a conference. A bracket before an action indicates that the action will take place in the future, and vice versa.

These ideograms are linked by a system of arrows and brackets that show the structure of a sentence that is to be interpreted. Using this system, one can note, for instance, that a sum has increased or decreased by a certain percentage (according to the arrow’s direction).

For example, the notes in the illustration might be interpreted to mean:

We are particularly glad to inform you about an important increase in our company’s revenues, which rose by 10 percent from 3.5 to 3.85 billion dollars.(*) This derives from huge sales of helicopters. The United States of America bought 50 and South Africa 20 of them. On the other hand, we must relocate parts of our production in these countries. (A billion (bn) is called a milliard (mrd or Md) in some languages.)*

Some interpreters have devised complete systems of abbreviations, which include all academic titles, administrative titles, military ranks, etc. Such a system has the drawback that, like shorthand, it may be useful only for a particular language.

== Bibliography ==
- Andres, Dorte: Konsekutivdolmetschen und Notation. 2000, ISBN 3-631-39856-5
- Farwick, Judith: Between the Signs. How to take notes without words. 2018. ISBN 9783752802696
- Gillies, Andrew (2017). Note-taking for Consecutive Interpreting: A Short Course (2nd ed.). Routledge. ISBN 978-1317302681.
  - Gillies, Andrew (2005). Note-taking for Consecutive Interpreting. ISBN 1-900650-82-7.
- Jones, Roderick: Conference Interpreting Explained. 1998, ISBN 1-900650-57-6
- Matyssek, Heinz: Handbuch der Notizentechnik für Dolmetscher. Ein Weg zur sprachunabhängigen Notation. 1989, ISBN 3-87276-616-3
- Roth, Daniel: Die Redeschrift. Ein Übungsheft für Dolmetscher. Grundlagen und sprachenübergreifende Symbole. 2018, ISBN 9783746775524
- Rozan, Jean-François: La Prise de Notes en Interprétation Consécutive. 1956, ISBN 2-8257-0053-3
- Seleskovitch, Danica: Langage, langues et mémoires.1975, ISBN 2-256-90752-X
- Snell-Hornby, Mary/Hönig, Hans G./Kußmaul, Paul/Schmitt, Peter A.: Handbuch Translation. 1999, ISBN 3-86057-995-9
