= ASL interpreting =

Translation of American Sign Language

ASL interpreting is the real-time translation between American Sign Language (ASL) and another language (typically English) to allow communication between parties who do not share functional use of either language. Domains of practice include medical/mental health, legal, educational/vocational training, worship, and business settings. Interpretation may be performed consecutively, simultaneously or a combination of the two, by an individual, pair, or team of interpreters who employ various interpreting strategies. ASL interpretation has been overseen by the Registry of Interpreters for the Deaf since 1964.

== Effective Communication ==
The Americans with Disabilities Act (ADA) requires that title II entities (State and local governments) and title III entities (businesses and nonprofit organizations that serve the public) communicate effectively with people who have communication disabilities, which includes hearing, vision, and speech disabilities, to "ensure that communication with people with these disabilities is equally effective as communication with people without disabilities." The rules of effective communication "ensure that the person with a vision, hearing, or speech disability can communicate with, receive information from, and convey information to, the covered entity."

To ensure effective communication, covered entities must provide auxiliary aids and services when needed and communicate with not only the person who is receiving the covered entity’s goods or services, but also their "companion," which includes any family member, friend, or associate of the person seeking or receiving an entity’s goods or services who is an appropriate person with whom the entity should communicate.

While the ADA requires covered entities to provide interpreters as needed, there are two exceptions which a covered entity can rely on the person's companion: 1. "in an emergency involving an imminent threat to the safety or welfare of an individual or the public, an adult or minor child accompanying a person who uses sign language may be relied upon to interpret or facilitate communication only when a qualified interpreter is not available," and 2. "in situations not involving an imminent threat, an adult accompanying someone who uses sign language may be relied upon to interpret or facilitate communication when a) the individual requests this, b) the accompanying adult agrees, and c) reliance on the accompanying adult is appropriate under the circumstances." The second exception does not apply if the companion is a minor child and covered entities "may not rely on an accompanying adult to interpret when there is reason to doubt the person’s impartiality or effectiveness."

== ASL Interpreting as a Profession ==
According to the U.S. Department of Justice, a qualified interpreter is “someone who is able to interpret effectively, accurately, and impartially, both receptively (i.e., understanding what the person with the disability is saying) and expressively (i.e., having the skill needed to convey information back to that person) using any necessary specialized vocabulary.” ASL interpreters work in a large variety of environments, including medical, legal, educational, mental health, vocational, and other environments. Interpreting is often viewed as a practice profession (other examples include law, teaching, counseling, medicine, etc.), which requires a careful judgment of interpersonal and environmental factors as well as expertise in the skills of the profession itself. The interpreter must be able to understand the concepts they are seeing and hearing, perform the mental translation, and communicate them effectively in the second language. Although the interpreter usually intends to be in the background of the conversation and not contribute beyond interpretation, overcoming differences between the languages often requires them to make judgments which might alter the flow of communication. As with any two languages, ASL and English do not have a one-to-one word correspondence, meaning interpreters cannot simply translate word-for-word. They must determine how to effectively communicate what one interlocutor means, rather than strictly what they say, to the other. This leads to interpreters making judgment calls and considering things such as linguistic barriers.

=== Qualifications ===
While the ADA does not mandate any specific credentials for working interpreters, with the exception of some states and territories that have minimum requirements for interpreters to work in specific settings, the ADA does mandate the use of "qualified interpreters." Qualifying interpreters could be certified and/or have the right education, experience, and content knowledge for a particular job, but certification doesn't guarantee qualification for every job. Additionally, there are "substantial barriers to obtaining certification for historically marginalized groups." Employers use various measures and factors to determine whether the interpreter meets the ADA's definition of qualified; measures can include education, experience, certification, assessments, licensure, and other regulatory mandates on a state-by-state basis.

Licensure is a legal requirement that outlines minimum competencies to perform interpreting services in a state. This may require proof of education, certification, and/or an assessment. Many states offer a provisional or temporary license with restrictions on where an interpreter can work based on their skill level.

Interpreters are required to possess a wide range of skills and attributes in order to effectively perform the duties required of them. Many 'soft' skills, such as etiquette, diplomacy, teamwork, and flexibility are complementary to the technical skills demanded by the participants in the interaction and the environment in which the interaction takes place. Although programs may vary widely based on the experience of the trainers, length and level of the program, and the institute in which it resides, the following outlines the broad topics that are required:

- The interpreting process
- The translation process
- Models of the interpreting process
- Language skills and knowledge
- Bi-cultural skills and personal attributes
- Discourse strategies, register, and linguistics
- Role, ethics, and professional practice
- Communication dynamics and demands
- Interpreting settings
- Practical skills and workplace experience
- Specialized skills such as team interpreting, telephone/video remote interpreting, DeafBlind, legal and medical, among others

=== Training Programs ===
The history of interpreter training in the United States has only recently been organized and documented. The US-based Registry of Interpreters for the Deaf maintains a list of 53 certificate, 82 associate's, 57 bachelor's, and 8 graduate-level programs.

=== Employment Opportunities ===
The nature of the workforce has undergone dramatic changes over the past 30 years. Many ASL-English interpreters in the US are either self-employed or obtain their work from an agency. In both situations, they work on a freelance basis. This type of employment status offers flexibility, self-determination with regard to hours, and the opportunity to encounter a wide range of clients in a wide range of environments. Opportunities also exist for interpreters to work on staff for various organizations such as in educational institutes (elementary, secondary, and post-secondary) or in organizations where a number of Deaf people are employed.

While video remote interpreting (akin to remote simultaneous interpreting or RSI among spoken language practitioners) has existed for decades, the COVID-19 pandemic saw a mass transition to virtual environments.

=== Code of Ethics ===
Interpreters who use signed and spoken languages can join organizations such as the Registry of Interpreters for the Deaf (RID) to provide quality support to people who may require their services and further advance this line of work. The RID co-authored the ethical code of conduct for interpreters w/the National Association of the Deaf (NAD). This organization outlines this code of ethics for interpreters to allow them to be held accountable and create an environment of trust between them and their clients. There are 7 Tenets in their Ethical Code:

- Interpreters adhere to standards of confidential communication.
- Interpreters possess the professional skills and knowledge required for the specific interpreting situation.
- Interpreters conduct themselves in a manner appropriate to the specific interpreting situation.
- Interpreters demonstrate respect for consumers.
- Interpreters demonstrate respect for colleagues, interns, and students of the profession.
- Interpreters maintain ethical business practices.
- Interpreters engage in professional development

There are 48 states with RID Chapters and representatives in Puerto Rico and the District of Columbia, not including Delaware and Maryland.

==== Code of Ethics for Educational Interpreters ====
The National Association of Interpreters in Education (NAIE) has a Code of Ethics for ASL Interpreters that work in educational settings and translate sign language, cued language, and oral languages. These ASL interpreters are commonly referred to as "educational interpreters." There are 7 main tenets set in place in order to provide students with equal access to communication and put their interests first. These 7 tenets are:

- Interpreters respect student autonomy.
- Interpreters provide access to language and communication in the educational environment at all times.
- Interpreters maintain the confidentiality of information pertaining to their work.
- Interpreters support and participate on the educational team.
- Interpreters continually develop their knowledge, skills, and professionalism to ensure they are qualified for all aspects of their role.
- Interpreters avoid perceived or actual conflicts of interest.
- Interpreters engage in ethical professional practices.

== Deaf Interpreters ==
Some ASL Interpreters are Deaf. Deaf interpreters can interpret between different sign languages (e.g. Auslan or Tactile signing), or act as a relay interpreter, an intermediary between a hearing Interpreter and a deaf client. One benefit of Deaf Interpreters is an increased cultural competency compared to hearing counterparts. Deaf Interpreters can be negatively affected in the workplace by the false belief that they are best thought of as assistants for non-deaf interpreters.

== Styles & Methods ==
As with all language combinations, ASL and English are two examples between which interpreting can take place. Interpreting between two different languages and cultures involves mostly the same process regardless of the language pair. Interpreting is a complicated process that involves a number of steps in order to achieve the ultimate goal of providing a communication link between two (or more) people who do not share the same language. The one key difference between spoken language interpreting and sign language interpreting is modality. Spoken language relies on auditory/verbal processes and sign language relies on visual/gestural.

=== Individual Interpreters ===
==== Consecutive vs Simultaneous Interpreting ====
Consecutive interpreting occurs when a time gap exists between the receipt of the source language to the moment the target language is delivered. This could be measured in seconds or even minutes. Contrast this with translation which may occur over a much longer time frame and involve much deeper processes to accurately provide meaning equivalence in the target language. Consider the translation of religious texts where the source text may have been written hundreds of years before the target text. Simultaneous interpreting on the other hand is considered to be more real-time. Due to the auditory influence of spoken languages consecutive interpreting is often a preferred method of service provision for spoken language interpreters. The Nuremberg trials after World War II was a significant event that changed the nature of spoken language interpreting services. Until then, simultaneous interpreting in a spoken language context was not applied but due to the complexity of the trial and the number of languages and language pairs being used, simultaneous interpreting was successfully implemented on a large and dynamic scale making it a defining moment in spoken language interpreting provision.

In ASL-English interpreting, ASL is, for the most part, silent and therefore does not readily interfere with the reception or production of the spoken language. With one language consuming a different mode, space is created to allow for the reception or production of the spoken language; however, simultaneous interpreting is not always the preferred method and careful attention needs to be applied by the practitioner to the task immediately before them. It is often preferable to consider the simultaneous-consecutive dichotomy as a continuum in which the interpreter possesses the ability to flow between the two extremes.

=== Teams of interpreters ===
While the following is a list of interpreting styles, teams of interpreters often are dynamic in their approach. Interpreting styles are not prescriptive; while they can be closely followed, they are also flexible and methodology may depend on the setting.

==== The "Hot/Cold" seat arrangement ====
This interpreting arrangement involves an interpreter sitting in front of the Deaf person/ people with another interpreter facing the "working" interpreter. The second interpreter's role is to assist the "working" interpreter via the supplementation of information if needed. It is typical for interpreters in this arrangement to arrange when they will switch roles beforehand so as to ensure smooth transitions between their services.

==== The modified "Hot/Cold" seat arrangement ====
This modified technique prompts interpreters to switch every time a different speaker speaks or signs. In a public presentation scenario, for example, one interpreter may interpret what the host of the event is saying and then switch with a partner when a guest speaker presents.

==== The "On/Off" seat arrangement ====
In this arrangement, "working" interpreters work for as long as they have decided each shift will be per interpreter; once they have finished their allotted time, they can have "off" time. This time away from interpreting can involve leaving the room and doing private things such as texting so long as it is unobtrusive. The rationale behind this technique is that interpreters are allowed a mental and physical break in order to ensure high-quality work during their rotation.

==== The "Deaf-focused" arrangement ====
To effectively explain this technique, imagine that interpreters have been assigned to assist a Deaf student in a college lecture setting. The "working" interpreter will communicate the topics and subject matter of the lecture whereas the second interpreter will focus more closely on the Deaf individual, working to support them as needed. An example of their role would be to locate information that a lecturer makes reference to in the student's notes as they are kept informed of the speaker's content by the "working" interpreter. In a situation with more than one Deaf student, the secondary interpreter can also work to clarify concepts and answer questions.

==== The "Double" arrangement ====
This technique involves two interpreters sitting in front of the Deaf person/ people. This arrangement does not involve switching on and off every set amount of minutes and, instead, the interpreters are assigned to certain people or groups of people. For example, one interpreter may interpret for a lecturer, whereas the other interprets for audience members/ students.

== History ==
In the United States, the Registry of Interpreters for the Deaf (RID) was founded in 1964 for the purpose of systematizing a process for interpreter certification. Six years later the first certification system was in place for practitioners in the field. Federal funding began the support of educational programs throughout the country in the early 1970s. A total of 10 regional centers and 2 national centers sprung up and continued under the US Department of Education funding until 2004 when the number of centers was reduced by half, 5 regional and 1 national.

Before Deaf communities formed, the earliest hearing interpreters were parents, siblings, and associates of signing deaf people; once educational and social networks spread, lay interpreters included those with childhood and professional ties to the Deaf community. By 2009 that number was less than 15%, the vast majority being those who took up the language through interest and study. Interpreters who are themselves Deaf generally appeared only after schools for deaf children were founded, as graduates and bilingual–bicultural products of the communities that developed around them.
