= Asetrad =

Translation association in Spain

Asetrad (abbreviation for the "Asociación Española de Traductores, Correctores e Intérpretes" or the "Spanish Association of Translators, Copy-editors, and Interpreters") is an association based in Spain to support and facilitate the work of translators, copy-editors, and interpreters.

It is a member of the International Federation of Translators (FIT).

Asetrad has an online publication, La Linterna del Traductor.
