= Colegio de Traductores Públicos del Uruguay =

The Uruguayan Sworn Translators Association (Spanish: Colegio de Traductores Públicos del Uruguay, CTPU) is a Uruguayan translation association.

Established in 1950, it is affiliated with the International Federation of Translators (FIT-IFT).

== Conferences ==
- The First International Translation and Interpreting Conference was held in September 2011.
- The Second International Translation and Interpreting Conference will be held in September 2017.
