= Macedonian Translators Association =

The Macedonian Translators Association (acronym MATA) is a professional association of translators based in Skopje, North Macedonia.

It has already held four international conferences.

MATA is a partner organization with IAPTI.
