= Norwegian Association of Audiovisual Translators =

The Norwegian Association of Audiovisual Translators (Norwegian: Norsk audiovisuell oversetterforening, NAViO) is an association organizing mainly translators dealing with subtitling for the cinema, television, video, DVD and Internet markets.

NAViO was established in 1997. Close to 140 translators have joined the association out of approximately 180 active translators in Norway (2007).

== Main objectives ==
NAViO's main objectives are to

- unite translators working within the audiovisual media,
- protect the common economic interests of its members,
- promote professional development and social exchange for its members,
- work for the recognition of subtitlers as professionals and
- make visible the cultural importance of the work performed by translators within the audiovisual media.
