= Association of Visual Language Interpreters of Canada =

Canadian professional association

Canadian Association of Sign Language Interpreters
- Abbreviation: CASLI
- Formation: 1979; 47 years ago
- Type: Nonprofit
- Website: www.casli.ca
- Formerly called: Association of Visual Language Interpreters of Canada (AVLIC)

The Canadian Association of Sign Language Interpreters (CASLI), formerly known as the Association of Visual Language Interpreters of Canada (AVLIC), is the national, non-profit certifying body for professional American Sign Language-English, Quebec Sign Language-French interpreters in Canada.

== History ==
The organization was established in 1979 as the Association of Visual Language Interpreters of Canada (AVLIC), and in 2018 was renamed to the Canadian Association of Sign Language Interpreters. As of 2022, it was the only national association representing interpreters in Canada.

The organization has an "Email Buddy Program" for new interpreters.

== Governance and partnerships ==
CASLI offers membership to professional interpreters, students training to become interpreters, and certain deaf individuals. Membership can be offered to interpreters who have not graduated from an interpreter training program through an alternative process. There is a Code of Ethics and Guidelines for Professional Conduct for members.

The organization operates under a national board with regional affiliate chapters (e.g., AQILS in Quebec). CASLI also maintains formal partnerships, such as with AQILS since 2016 and with Deaf-led organizations like CAD and CCSD. Additionally, it is a member of the World Association of Sign Language Interpreters.

== See also ==
- American Sign Language (ASL)
- Canadian Association of the Deaf
- International Federation of Translators
- Quebec Sign Language (LSQ)
