= International Association of Professional Translators and Interpreters =

- Abbreviation: IAPTI
- Formation: 30 September 2009
- Legal status: active
- Location: Buenos Aires, Argentina
- Region served: Worldwide
- Members: 750
- President of the Board of Directors: Aurora Humarán
- Website: IAPTI

The International Association of Professional Translators and Interpreters (IAPTI) is an international professional association of translators and interpreters based in Argentina.

== History ==
Based in Buenos Aires, Argentina, IAPTI was established on 30 September 2009. Created by a group of professional language mediators as a vehicle for promoting ethical practices in translation and interpretation and providing a forum for discussing problems typical of the globalized world, such as crowdsourcing, outsourcing, bad rates and other abuse. Technological-ethical issues are also important to IAPTI, such as the exploitation of language professionals as cheap proofreaders of machine-translated texts.

It was founded by Aurora Humarán, an Argentinian sworn translator, Corresponding Member of the North American Academy of the Spanish Language, and marketing specialist.

IAPTI applied for registration as a civil association in the City of Buenos Aires (Argentina). Its legal registration under the name "International Association of Professional Translators and Interpreters" took a long time to process with the Office of the Argentine Inspector-General for Justice. On 23 February 2017 it was announced that the Inspector-General for Justice has finally approved IAPTI as a civil association.

According to its bylaws, the Association is directed and managed by a Board of Directors made up of the six following officers: President, Vice President, Secretary General, Treasurer, two Voting Members and two Alternate Voting Members.

In November 2016, a number of staff members stepped down from their positions, including its former Ethics Committee president, claiming IAPTI's legal status controversy, unaccountability and lack of transparency of IAPTI, as well as its failure to hold elections since its establishment. As a response, IAPTI’s board informed that several modifications of its bylaws had been made to accommodate the requirements of the Argentine regulatory authority, and dismissed the claims as baseless, unfounded charges by some of its former members. Some months later, the Argentine regulator finally approved IAPTI.

== Events ==
As of 27 August 2024, IAPTI has held 5 international conferences: London (2013), Athens (2014), Bordeaux (2015), Buenos Aires (2017), Valencia (2018), Timișoara (2023). Another conference is about to be held at Bursa.

== Partnerships ==
In 2013, IAPTI joined forces with AIIC, Red T and FIT in the Open Letter Project, which had been launched in 2012. Later they were also joined by Critical Link International, the International Council for the Development of Community Interpreting (CLI), and the World Association of Sign Language Interpreters (WASLI).

They have sent open letters addressing several issues, among others:

- put pressure on governments to ensure the long-term safety of linguists who served their troops in Afghanistan
- ask the President of the United States for consideration with translators and interpreters in the wake of war against ISIS
- advocate for the UN to pass a resolution declaring the 30 September as International Translation Day

== Supports ==
Since 2009 language professionals from several countries have been active members of IAPTI, such as interpreter Tony Rosado or academic Mona Baker. Further, IAPTI's actions regarding freedom of expression of translators and interpreters received support from the New England Translators Association.
