= Registry of Interpreters for the Deaf =

U.S. non-profit organization

The Registry of Interpreters for the Deaf, Inc (RID) is a non-profit organization founded on June 16, 1964, and incorporated in 1972, that seeks to uphold standards, ethics, and professionalism for American Sign Language interpreters. RID is currently a membership organization. The organization grants credentials earned by interpreters who have passed assessments for American Sign Language to English and English to American Sign Language interpretation and maintains their certificates by taking continuing education units. RID provides a Certification Maintenance Program (CMP) to certified members in support of skill-enhancing studies. The organization also provides the Ethical Practices System (EPS) for those who want to file grievances against members of RID. The organization also collaborated with the National Association of the Deaf (NAD) to develop the Code of Professional Conduct (CPC). The CPC Standard Practice Papers (SPP) are also available for professional interpreters to reference. RID is headquartered in Alexandria, Virginia.

== History ==
In 1920 the Civilian Vocational Rehabilitation Act was passed to provide funds to rehabilitation agencies for people with disabilities who were not Veterans of war. In 1954 the Vocational Rehabilitation Act Amendment passed, including using interpreters but without funding to train people to become interpreters. The Department of Health, Education, and Welfare enlisted a Deaf man, Boyce Williams, to research the programs for Deaf people around the country in 1955. The report he gave instituted training for many people in ways to communicate and interact with Deaf individuals, specifically related to Vocational Rehabilitation. It was in the 1960s when the United States Government had begun to pass legislation that improved the lives of people with disabilities and encompassed the rights for post-secondary education for persons who were Deaf, Hard of Hearing, and DeafBlind, as well as a transition of friends and family interpreting to the idea for professional interpreters. In 1965 the advisory committee headed up by Dr. Homer D. Babbidge, Jr. presented the "Babbidge Report" or the "Education of the Deaf: A Report to the Secretary of Health, Education, and Welfare by his Advisory Committee on the Education of the Deaf". The lack of educational access for the Deaf was highlighted. Simultaneously, the Vocational Rehabilitation Administration under HEW provided grant 460-T-64 in the amount of $17,572 to William J. McClure at Ball State Teachers College in Muncie, IN, to produce a series of workshops to produce "Guidelines for Interpreting for the Deaf". It was at the first workshop in 1964 that Dr. Edgar Lowell and Dr. Ralph Hoag discussed establishing a registry of interpreters for the deaf. On the evening of June 16, 1964, participants from the workshop met, and a formal meeting led by Dr. Edgar Lowell produced the first board of the "National Registry of Professional Interpreters and Translators for the Deaf". The first President Mr. Kenneth Huff, established the by-law committee and the membership committee during the Executive Board meeting later that evening. The first members consisted of 42 hearing interpreters and 22 sustaining members, although 7 of the sustaining members stated they were interpreters as well. At this time, all sustaining members were Deaf attendees of the first meeting.

The original members were educators, psychologists, and other professionals who worked with the Deaf, Hard of Hearing, and DeafBlind communities. The members at the time did not consider themselves interpreters even though they provided that service for people in their communities. The establishment of this organization was the first time a professional American Sign Language Interpreter was considered. Many original members performed interpretation duties because it was necessary and without expected compensation. Many were connected to the Deaf community based on family, friends, employment, or religious association and had careers separate from interpreting. One of the most challenging tasks that RID had to overcome was changing the perspectives of both Deaf and Hearing clients, from the interpreter being a helper to a professional. To accomplish this change, RID partnered with many other Deaf and Interpreter organizations. They partnered with the National Association of the Deaf on interpreter codes of conduct, testing, and other projects. The organization has also worked with the Conference of Interpreter Trainers (CIT) to help develop training programs for interpreters. Gallaudet University and the National Association of the Deaf provided them office space in their early days.

=== Notable Founding Members ===
Source:

== Governance and Operations ==
RID is governed by an eleven-member board of directors elected directly by the voting membership for a two-year term. Voting rights are determined by being a member in good standing of both RID (in the certified or associate category) and a sanctioned affiliate chapter. The board is made up of the following positions:

- President
- Vice President
- Secretary
- Treasurer
- Member-at-Large
- Deaf Member-at-Large
- Region I Representative
- Region II Representative
- Region III Representative
- Region IV Representative
- Region V Representative

Following the expiration of the president's term, they serve an ex officio non-voting term on the board of directors as Immediate Past President.

The executive board consists of the president, vice president, secretary, treasurer, member-at-large, and Deaf member-at-large and is elected on odd years for two-year terms. The regional representative positions are elected on even years for two-year terms.

To run for election to the executive board, members must collect 25 nomination signatures from voting members, with at least one from each region of RID. Regional representative candidates meet two requirements before nomination. The Regional representative must reside in the area for a minimum of two years and be a member in good standing for a minimum of 4 years. The Member-at-Large requirement is not as stringent as the other members of the board. An election is held via online balloting if there are two or more candidates.

The 2022 board of directors is as follows:

RID Board of Directors
| Office | Name | Elected |
|---|---|---|
| President | Ritchie Bryant, MS, CDI, CLIP-R | |
| Vice President | Dr. Jesus Remigio, PsyD, MBA, CDI | |
| Secretary | Jason Hurdich, M.Ed, CDI | |
| Treasurer | Kate O'Regan, MA, NIC | |
| Member-at-Large | Traci Ison, NIC, NAD IV | |
| Deaf Member-at-Large | Glenna Cooper, PDIC | |
| Region I Representative | Christina Stevens, NIC | |
| Region II Representative | Antwan Campbell, MPA, ED: K-12 | |
| Region III Representative | Shawn Vriezen, CDI, QMHI | |
| Region IV Representative | Justin "Bucky" Buckhold, CDI | |
| Region V Representative | Jeremy Quiroga, CDI | |

RID operations are conducted by a paid staff led by an executive director. The current executive director is Star Grieser, MS, CDI, ICE-CCP.

== Code of Professional Conduct ==
As part of their push to improve the ethical behavior of practitioners in the field, RID, with the collaboration of the National Association of the Deaf (NAD), revised and updated the Code of Ethics. In 2005, the Code of Professional Conduct was adopted.

The tenets of the current Code of Professional Conduct include the following intentions. Under each tenet, a section has additional clarification statements.

1. Situations and stakeholders require confidentiality before, during, and after each communication interaction. There are some exceptions to the rule based on State mandated practices, such as situations of potential harm to either the participant or others and subpoenas.
2. Each Deaf, Hard of Hearing, and Deaf-Blind person, as well as each situation, has its intricacies. An interpreter should only accept assignments that match their skill level or expertise.
3. An interpreter's behavior, appearance, and possible conflicts of interest are clarified in 10 subheadings under tenet three.
4. Bestowing respect for stakeholders' decisions in preferred communication access and autonomy as well as gaining consent to include interns' care given under tenet four.
5. Outside of employment situations, the profession also includes colleagues, interns, and students. This tenet has five guidelines when working with other members of the profession.
6. Business practices for interpreters include identification to consumers of qualifications or certifications, the ability to earn compensation equating to their skill and education level, the ability to make a living wage, professional behavior, and safe working conditions. The eight subheadings guide this professional behavior.
7. Continuing education is the core of the final tenet. As new laws are added, and new content in various disciplines emerges, interpreters are expected to be knowledgeable and aware of these changes.

== RID certifications ==
RID has a national certification system with three key components:

- Award Certifications to qualified interpreters based on successful requirement execution.
- The Certification Maintenance Program (CMP) - assures the continual skill development of certified interpreters.
- The Ethical Practices System (EPS) - gives consumers the ability to express concerns or complain about the quality of interpreting/transliterating services.

=== Certifications ===
In previous incarnations of the certification process, RID administered its test under the National Testing System(NTS). The following certifications were given to interpreters meeting the testing criteria (All credentials awarded by the Registry of Interpreters for the Deaf will remain valid as long as the holder of said certification(s) maintains their membership and maintenance program.):

Previously offered certificates:

- CSC - Comprehensive Skills Certificate (1972–1988)
- MCSC - Master Comprehensive Skills Certificate (1972–1988)
- RSC - Reverse Skills Certificate - awarded only to Deaf/hard-of-hearing interpreters/transliterators (1972–1988)
- OIC:C - Oral Interpreting Certificate, Comprehensive (1979–1985)
- OIC: S/V - Oral Interpreting Certificate, Spoken to Visible (1979–1985)
- OIC: V/S - Oral Interpreting Certificate, Visible to Spoken (1979–1985)
- IC - Interpretation Certificate (1972–1988)
- TC - Transliteration Certificate (1972–1988)
- IC/TC - Interpretation and Transliteration Certificates (1972–1988)
- SC:L - Specialist Certificate: Legal (first certificate version of this certification was offered 1975–1978)
- SC:PA - Specialist Certificate: Performing Arts (1979 - This certificate was only offered once at the completion of an intensive training and there were only ten individuals awarded the SC:PA)
- OIC:C - Oral Interpreting Certificate (1979–1983)
- CI - Certificate of Interpretation (1988–2005)
- CT - Certificate of Transliteration (1988–2005)
- NIC Advanced and NIC Master (These levels were offered from 2005 to 2011)

Currently offered certificates:

- CDI - Certified Deaf Interpreter
- OTC - Oral Transliteration Certificate (On moratorium since August 2015)
- SC:L - Specialist Certificate: Legal (On moratorium since August 2015)
- NIC- National Interpreter Certification

RID granted certified membership to holders of the defunct NAD certification at levels III, IV and V. The certifications for these members are listed as:

- NAD III
- NAD IV
- NAD V

No new certified member status is being granted for any of these categories.

As of July 6, 2022, a new certification test, developed By CASLI in cooperation with both Deaf and Hearing Interpreters, was released. Members who take and pass the current CASLI the test will gain National Interpreting Certification or Certified Deaf Interpreter credentials through the RID. It will be recognized to have the skills necessary to do ASL-English interpreting throughout the United States and parts of Canada.

=== Certification Maintenance Program (CMP) ===
The Certification Maintenance Program (CMP) is a Continuing Educations Unit (CEU) tracking system for Certified Members. To maintain their certification, a member must complete 8.0 CEUs or 80 hours of education during a four-year cycle. The four ways to earn CEUs are Workshops that are RID/ACET approved, Participant Initiated Non-RID Activities (PINRA), Academic Coursework, and Independent Study. There are two categories of CEUs. Professional Study CEUs are directly connected to the interpreting field. A member must complete 6.0 or 60 hours of Professional Study CEUs. These can be workshops or post-secondary classes related to ASL linguistics, Deaf Culture, and other languages. A member must also gain 1.0 or 10 hours of Power, Privilege, and Oppression (PPO) CEUs that will be included in the Professional Studies category. If a member has a specialty such as Legal interpreting, they must complete 2.0 or 20 hours per cycle in their specialty. General Studies are any other type of continuing education. This can be an accounting class or a local workshop on watershed maintenance. For a person to earn CEUs in the PINRA, Academic Coursework, and Independent Study categories, they need to contact a CMP Sponsor to approve and process them before and after the activity. ACET is the Associate Continuing Educations Tracking for members who are still working on their certification but have not yet passed the test.

=== Ethical Practices System (EPS) ===
The Ethical Practices System (EPS) processes complaints and determines actions to be taken after a review process. The EPS has been established for the public to file complaints against individual members of RID. The process for filing a complaint must be started within 90 days of the situation. The complaint can either be presented in ASL or written, and complete information must be presented in the complaint. The requirements include the full names of the person filing the complaint and the interpreter, the incident's date and location and a complete statement including evidence. The full set of requirements is in the EPS Policy Manual. After the intake is complete, the case is then rejected or accepted. When the claim is accepted, the next step is mediation or adjudication. A final decision will be made after the case is thoroughly investigated. If the results are unsatisfactory, there is an appeal process.

== See also ==
- National Association of the Deaf
- Elizabeth English Benson (scholarship)
