= International Association of Conference Interpreters =

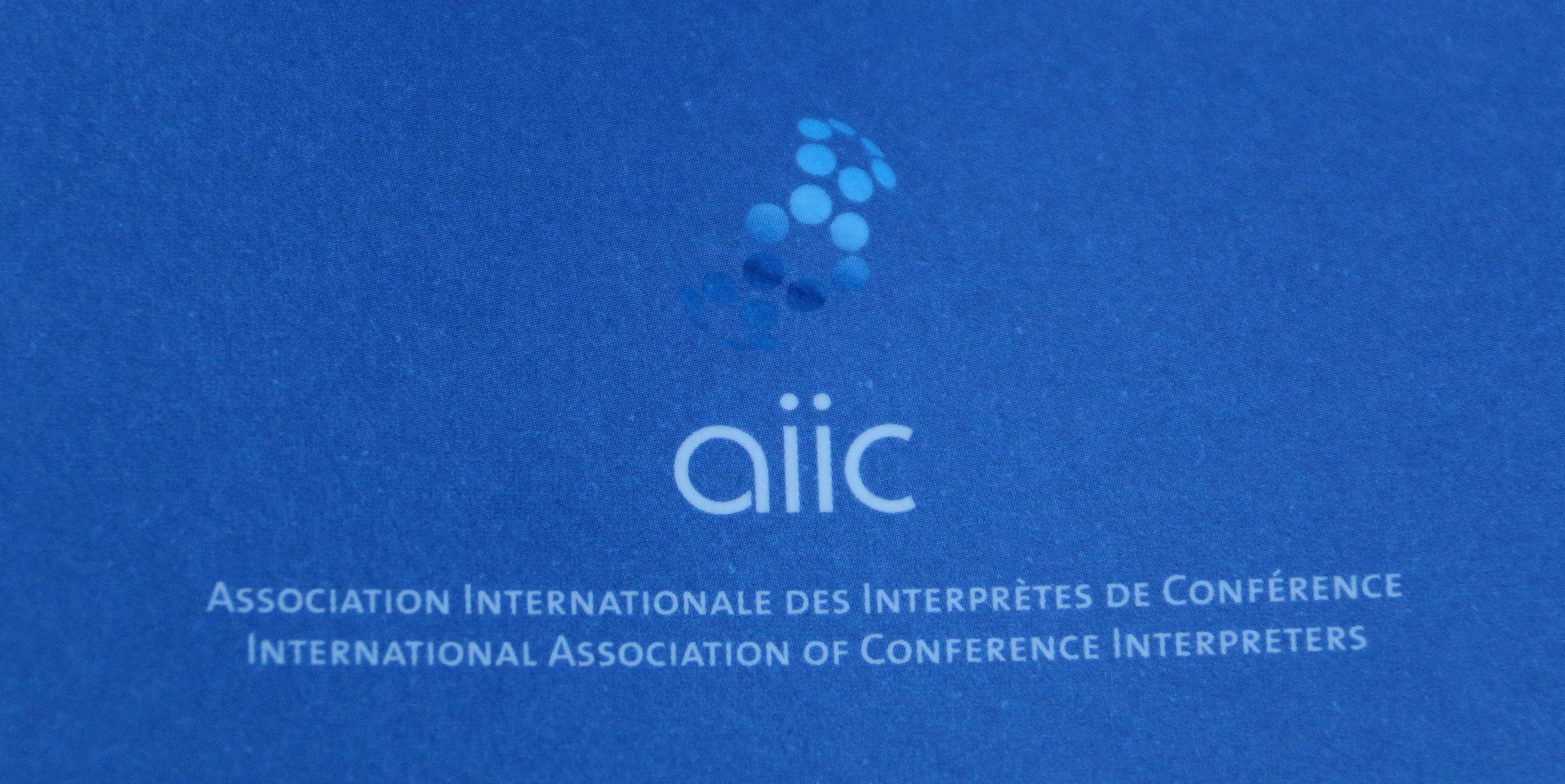
Logo

The International Association of Conference Interpreters - AIIC (AIIC – Association Internationale des Interprètes de Conférence) was founded in 1953. It represents over 3,000 members present in over 100 countries.

== Overview ==
AIIC is the only global association of conference interpreters. Since the early days of modern conference interpreting, AIIC has promoted high standards of quality and ethics in the profession and represented the interests of its practitioners.

AIIC is active in all areas affecting conference interpreting and works for the benefit of all conference interpreters and the profession as a whole. AIIC sets professional and ethical standards, promotes the working conditions necessary for high-quality interpreting, and contributes its expertise to ensure that future generations of interpreters are trained to today's high standards.

The association has a strict admissions procedure based on a peer review system, intended to guarantee high-quality interpreting and professionalism. Candidates must be sponsored by interpreters who have been AIIC members for at least five years. AIIC members are required to abide by the association's code of ethics and its professional standards.

== Partnerships ==
AIIC liaises with a number of international organisations (e.g., the EU and the United Nations) and negotiates the working conditions for all of their non-staff interpreters, including non-members. The AIIC goals are to secure acceptable working conditions for interpreters, to ensure professional interpretation, and to raise public awareness of the interpreting profession. It is also involved in other areas of the profession, such as:

- programmes for young conference interpreters - VEGA;
- continuing professional development;
- standardisation;
- new technologies in conference interpretation;
- court and legal interpretation;
- interpretation in conflict areas, and
- "preservation of World Linguistic Heritage".

AIIC has joined forces with IAPTI, Red T and FIT in an effort to put pressure on governments to ensure the long-term safety of linguists who served their troops in Afghanistan.

== Publications ==
AIIC issues a webzine named Communicate!.

Naissance d'une profession [Birth of a Profession]: a book describing conference interpreting from its beginnings in the early 20th century to the present. (2013)
