= World Association of Sign Language Interpreters =

International organization

The World Association of Sign Language Interpreters (WASLI) is an international organization aimed at the promotion of the profession of sign language interpretation.

WASLI was established 23 July 2003 during the 14th World Congress of the World Federation of the Deaf in Montreal, Canada. Its office is located in Geneva, Switzerland.
