= Language interpretation =

Facilitating of oral or sign-language communication between users of different languages

Interpretation is translation from a spoken or signed language into another language, usually in real time to facilitate live communication. It is distinguished from the translation of a written text, which can be more deliberative and make use of external resources and tools.

The most common two modes of interpretation are simultaneous, which is performed contemporaneously with the expression of the source language, and consecutive, where the interpreted speech is heard only during associated breaks in the original speech.

Interpretation is an ancient human activity which predates the invention of writing.

== History ==
=== Historiography ===
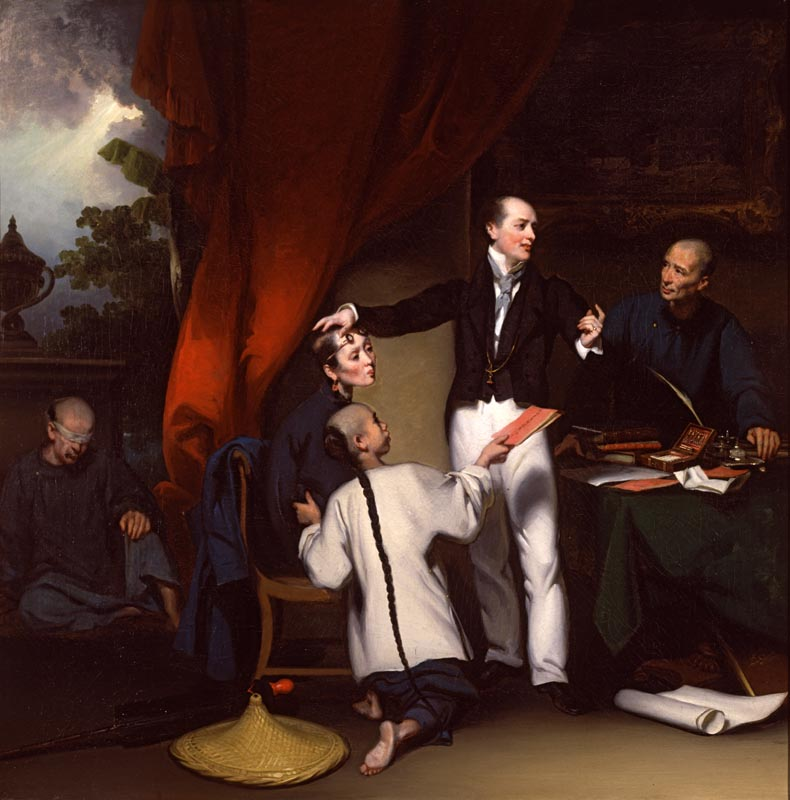
A painting showing a doctor explaining the outcome of an operation to his servant, who acts as an interpreter

Research into the various aspects of the history of interpretation is quite recent. For as long as most scholarly interest was given to professional conference interpretation, very little academic work was conducted on the practice of interpretation in history, and until the 1990s, only a few dozen publications were focused on it.

Considering the amount of interpretation that is assumed to have occurred for thousands of years, historical records are limited. Moreover, interpreters and their work have usually not found their way into the history books. One of the reasons for that is the dominance of the written text over the spoken word (in the sense that those who have left written texts are more likely to be recorded by historians). Another problem is the tendency to view it as an ordinary support activity which does not require any special attention, and the social status of interpreters, who were sometimes treated unfairly by scribes, chroniclers and historians. (Note: Interpreters were often ethnic and cultural mixtures, women, slaves or members of a "subcaste" (such as the Armenians and Jews in British India), as well as victims of kidnappings, conflict and political upheaval.)

Knowledge of the past of interpretation tends to come from letters, chronicles, biographies, diaries and memoirs, along with a variety of other documents and literary works, many of which (and with few exceptions) were only incidentally or marginally related to interpretation.

== Etymology ==
Many Indo-European languages have words for interpreting and interpreter. Expressions in Germanic, Scandinavian and Slavic languages denoting an interpreter can be traced back to Akkadian, around 1900 BCE. The Akkadian root targumânu/turgumânu also gave rise to the term dragoman via an etymological sideline from Arabic.

The English word interpreter, however, is derived from Latin interpres (meaning 'expounder', 'person explaining what is obscure'), whose semantic roots are not clear. Some scholars take the second part of the word to be derived from partes or pretium (meaning 'price', which fits the meaning of a 'middleman', 'intermediary' or 'commercial go-between'), but others have suggested a Sanskrit root.

== Modes ==
=== Consecutive ===
An interpreter (right) utilizing consecutive interpretation to translate a conversation between an English-speaking interviewer (left) and Spanish-speaking Gary Sánchez (center)

In consecutive interpretation (CI), the interpreter starts to interpret after the speaker pauses; thus much more time (perhaps double) is needed. Customarily, such an interpreter will sit or stand near the speaker.

Consecutive interpretation can be conducted in a pattern of short or long segments according to the interpreter's preference. In short CI, the interpreter relies mostly on memory whereas, in long CI, most interpreters will rely on note-taking. The notes must be clear and legible in order to not waste time on reading them. Consecutive interpretation of whole thoughts, rather than in small pieces, is desirable so that the interpreter has the whole meaning before rendering it in the target language. This affords a truer, more accurate, and more accessible interpretation than where short CI or simultaneous interpretation is used.

An attempt at consensus about lengths of segments may be reached prior to commencement, depending upon complexity of the subject matter and purpose of the interpretation, though speakers generally face difficulty adjusting to unnatural speech patterns.

On occasion, document sight translation is required of the interpreter during consecutive interpretation work. Sight translation combines interpretation and translation; the interpreter must render the source-language document to the target-language as if it were written in the target language. Sight translation occurs usually, but not exclusively, in judicial and medical work.

Consecutive interpretation may be the chosen mode when bilingual listeners are present who wish to hear both the original and interpreted speech or where, as in a court setting, a record must be kept of both.

=== Simultaneous ===
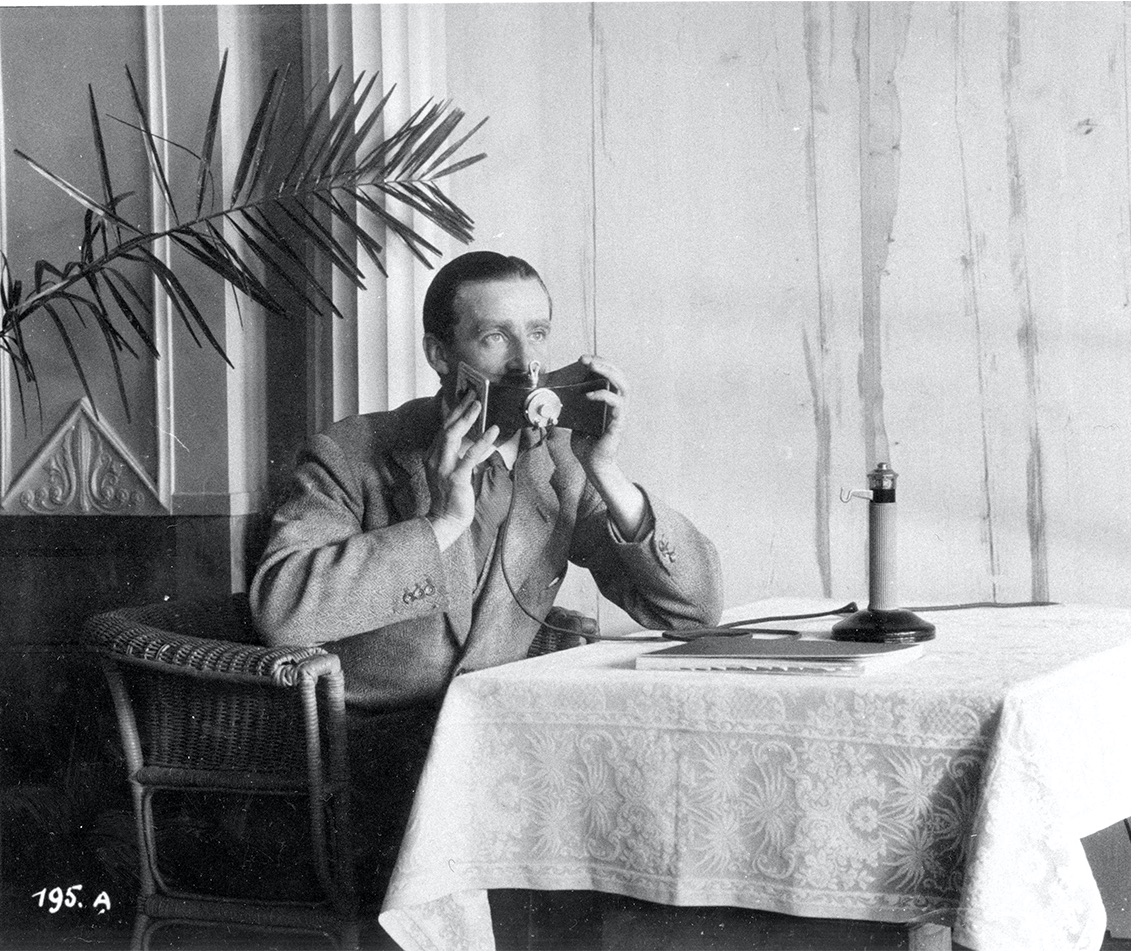
Alan Gordon-Finlay trialling the Hush-A-Phone at the League of Nations, c. 1927 – ILO Historical Archives

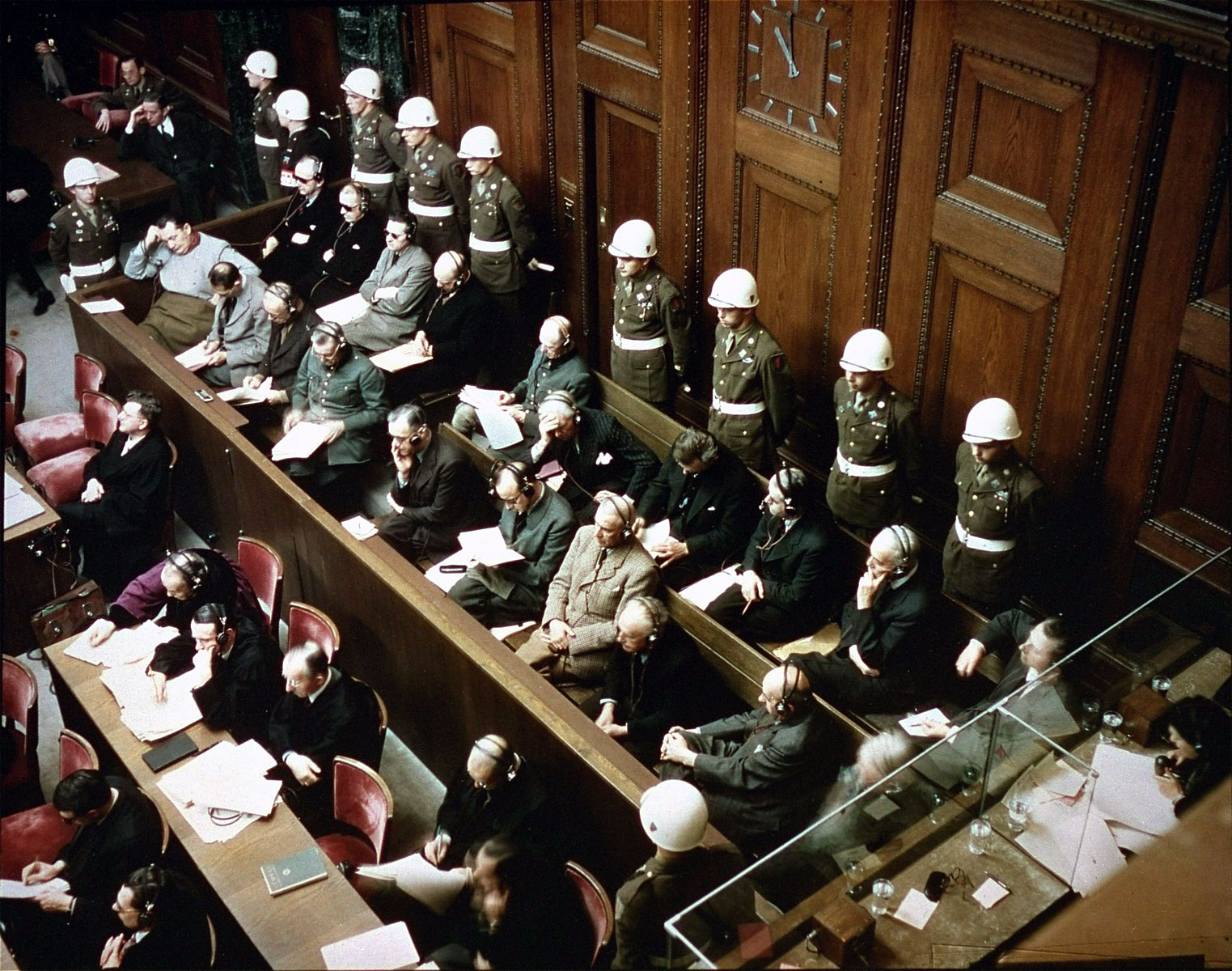
Nuremberg defendants at dock listening to simultaneous interpretation

Simultaneous interpretation (SI) has the disadvantage that if a person is performing the service the interpreter must do the best they can within the time permitted by the pace of source speech. However they also have the advantages of saving time and not disturbing the natural flow of the speaker. SI can also be accomplished by software where the program can simultaneously listen to incoming speech and speak the associated interpretation. The most common form is extempore SI, where the interpreter does not know the message until they hear it.

Simultaneous interpretation using electronic equipment where the interpreter can hear the speaker's voice as well as the interpreter's own voice was introduced at the Nuremberg trials in 1945. The equipment facilitated large numbers of listeners, and interpretation was offered in French, Russian, German and English. The technology arose in the 1920s and 1930s when American businessman Edward Filene and British engineer Alan Gordon Finlay developed simultaneous interpretation equipment with IBM. Yvonne Kapp attended a conference with simultaneous interpretation in 1935 in the Soviet Union. As it proved successful, IBM was able to sell the equipment to the United Nations, where it is now widely used in the United Nations Interpretation Service.

In the ideal setting for oral language, the interpreter sits in a sound-proof booth and speaks into a microphone, while clearly seeing and hearing the source-language speaker via earphones. The simultaneous interpretation is rendered to the target-language listeners via their earphones.

=== Relay interpretation ===
When no interpreter is available to interpret directly from source to target, an intermediate interpreter will be inserted in a relay mode, e.g. a Greek source language could be interpreted into English and then from English to another language. This may also be known as double-interpretation. This may be either consecutive or simultaneous; for example the United Nations uses simultaneous relay interpretation when the source language is Arabic or Chinese.

=== The progressive shift from consecutive to simultaneous ===
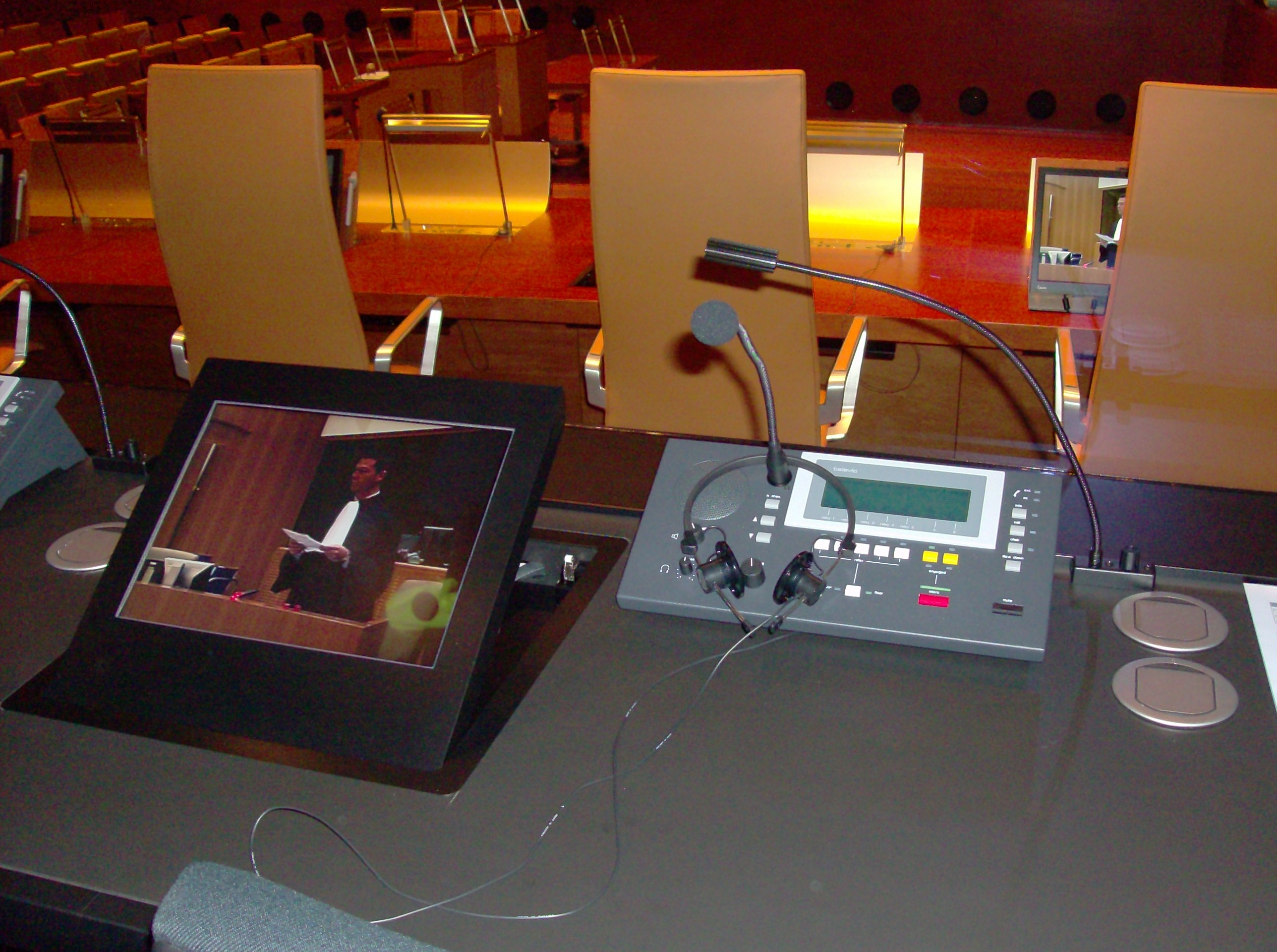
Simultaneous interpreter's station (Televic Conference) at the European Court of Justice

Pavel Palazchenko's My Years with Gorbachev and Shevardnadze: The Memoir of a Soviet Interpreter gives a short history of modern interpretation and of the transition from its consecutive to simultaneous forms. He explains that during the nineteenth century, interpreters were rarely needed during European diplomatic discussions; these were routinely conducted in French, and all government diplomats were required to be fluent in this language. Most European government leaders and heads of state could also speak French. Historian Harold Nicolson attributes the growing need for interpretation after World War I to the fact that U.S. President Woodrow Wilson and British Prime Minister David Lloyd George "were no linguists". At the time, the concept and special equipment needed for simultaneous interpretation, later patented by Alan Gordon Finlay, had not been developed, so consecutive interpretation was used.

Consecutive interpreters, in order to be accurate, used a specialized system of note-taking which included symbols, abbreviations and acronyms. Because they waited until the speaker was finished to provide interpretation, the interpreters then had the difficult task of creating from these notes as much as half an hour of free-flowing sentences closely matching the speaker's meaning. Palazchenko cites Anton Velleman, Jean Herbert and the Kaminker brothers as skilled interpreters, and notes one unusual case in which André Kaminker interpreted a speech by a French diplomat who spoke for two and a half hours without stopping.

After World War II, simultaneous interpretation came into use at the Nuremberg trials and began to be more accepted. Experienced consecutive interpreters asserted that the difficulties of listening and speaking at the same time, adjusting for differences in sentence structure between languages, and interpreting the beginning of a sentence before hearing its end, would produce an inferior result. As well, these interpreters, who to that point had been prominent speakers, would now be speaking invisibly from booths.

In 1951, when the United Nations expanded its number of working languages to five (English, French, Russian, Chinese and Spanish), consecutive interpretation became impractical in most cases, and simultaneous interpretation became the most common process for the organization's large meetings. Consecutive interpretation, which provides a more fluent result without the need for specialized equipment, continued to be used for smaller discussions.

=== Whispered ===
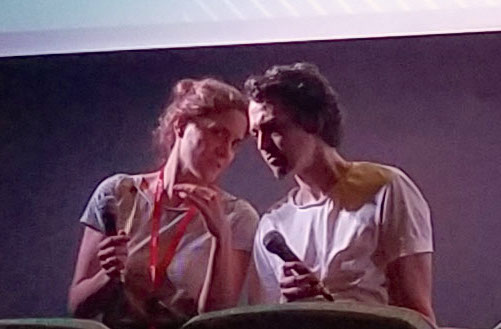
Interpreter (left) next to Swedish filmmaker Johannes Nyholm at Buenos Aires International Festival of Independent Cinema 2019

Whispered interpretation is known in the trade by the French term chuchotage. To avoid disturbing the participants using the original language, the interpreter speaks to a few people at close proximity with normal voiced delivery at a very low volume, or through electronic equipment without the benefit of a soundproof booth. Typically, no actual whispering is involved as this is difficult to decipher, causes postural fatigue while parties lean in to one another, and straining to be heard at a whisper "can be as bad for your voice as shouting."

== Types ==
=== Conference ===
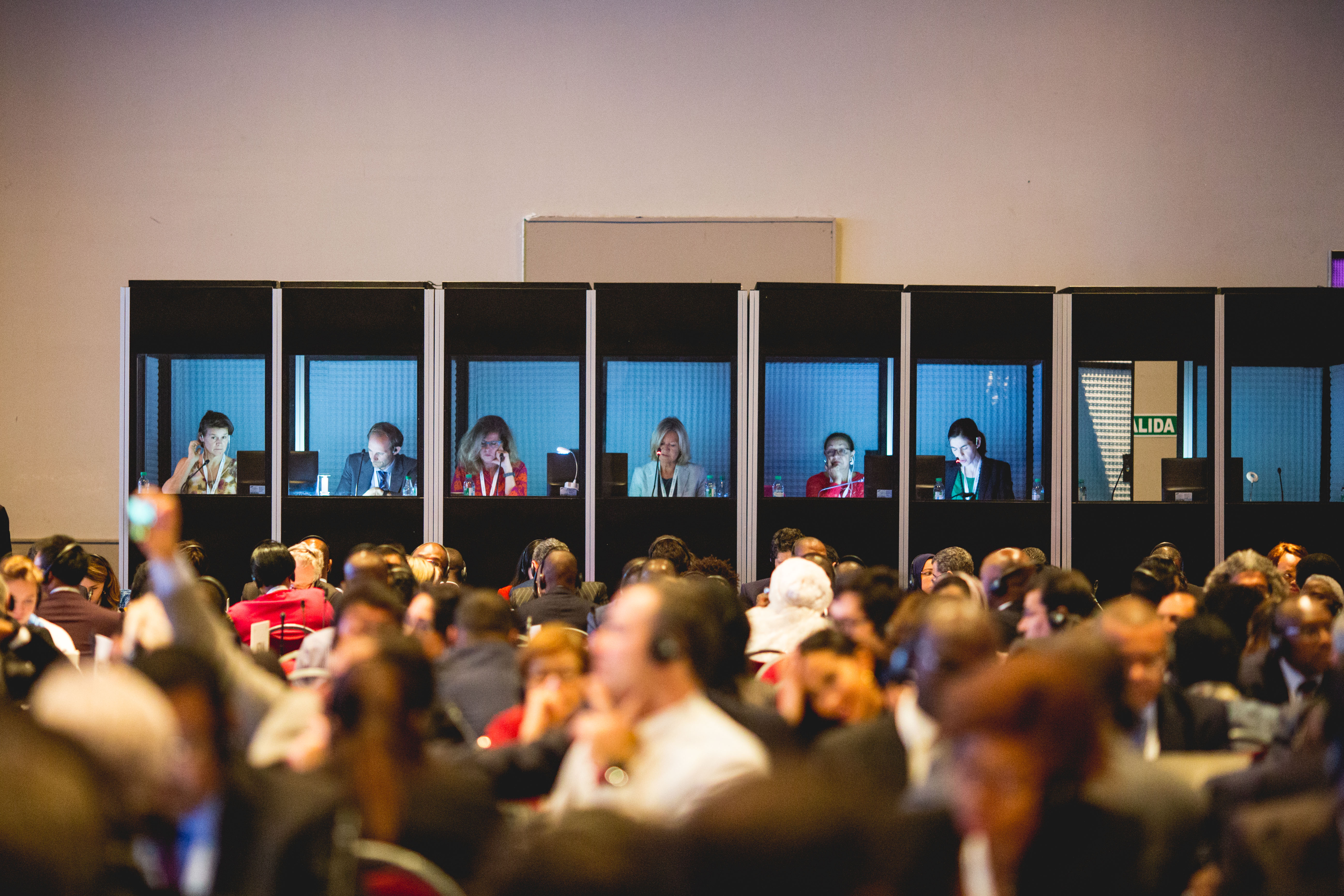
Interpreting booths at a conference by the World Trade Organization 2017

Conference interpreting refers to interpretation at a conference or large meeting, either simultaneously or consecutively. The advent of multi-lingual meetings has reduced the amount of consecutive interpretation in the last 20 years.

Conference interpretation is divided between two markets: institutional and private. International institutions (European Union, United Nations, EPO, et cetera), which hold multilingual meetings, often favor interpreting several foreign languages into the interpreters' mother tongues. Local private markets tend to have bilingual meetings (the local language plus another), and the interpreters work both into and out of their mother tongues. These markets are not mutually exclusive. The International Association of Conference Interpreters (AIIC) is the only worldwide association of conference interpreters. Founded in 1953, its membership includes more than 2,800 professional conference interpreters, in more than 90 countries.

=== Judicial ===
Judicial, legal, or court interpreting occurs in courts of justice, administrative tribunals, and wherever a legal proceeding is held (i.e., a police station for an interrogation, a conference room for a deposition, or the locale for taking a sworn statement). Legal interpreting can be the consecutive interpretation of witnesses' testimony, for example, or the simultaneous interpretation of entire proceedings, by electronic means, for one person, or all of the people attending. In a legal context, where ramifications of misinterpretation may be dire, accuracy is paramount. Teams of two or more interpreters, with one actively interpreting and the second monitoring for greater accuracy, may be deployed.

The right to a competent interpreter for anyone who does not understand the language of the court (especially for the accused in a criminal trial) is usually considered a fundamental rule of justice. Therefore, this right is often guaranteed in national constitutions, declarations of rights, fundamental laws establishing the justice system or by precedents set by the highest courts. However, it is not a constitutionally required procedure (in the United States) that a certified interpreter be present at police interrogation. This has been especially controversial in cases where illegal immigrants with no English skills are accused of crimes.

In the US, depending upon the regulations and standards adhered to per state and venue, court interpreters usually work alone when interpreting consecutively, or as a team, when interpreting simultaneously. In addition to practical mastery of the source and target languages, thorough knowledge of law and legal and court procedures is required of court interpreters. They are often required to have formal authorization from the state to work in the courts – and then are called certified court interpreters. (Note: The majority of state court systems utilize a certification exam developed and administered by the National Center for State Courts. Most non-native speakers of English use the term "sworn interpreter," which is calqued from a civil-law position title common throughout the world. However, there is no common law country that uses this term.) In many jurisdictions, the interpretation is considered an essential part of the evidence. Incompetent interpretation, or simply failure to swear in the interpreter, can lead to a mistrial.

=== Escort interpreter ===
In escort interpreting, an interpreter accompanies a person or a delegation on a tour, on a visit, or to a business meeting or interview. An interpreter in this role is called an escort interpreter or an escorting interpreter. An escort interpreter's work session may run for days, weeks, or even months, depending on the period of the client's visit. This type of interpreting is often needed in business contexts, during presentations, investor meetings, and business negotiations. As such, an escort interpreter needs to be equipped with some business and financial knowledge in order to best understand and convey messages back and forth.

Signed language interpreters typically refer to this role as a "designated interpreter." It is not a new practice; since the 1960s, deaf professionals and academics such as Robert Sanderson increasingly sought out and trained specific interpreters to work with on a regular, if not exclusive basis.

=== Public sector ===
Also known as community interpreting, is the type of interpreting occurring in fields such as legal, health, and federal and local government, social, housing, environmental health, education, and welfare services. In community interpreting, factors exist which determine and affect language and communication production, such as speech's emotional content, hostile or polarized social surroundings, its created stress, the power relationships among participants, and the interpreter's degree of responsibility – in many cases more than extreme; in some cases, even the life of the other person depends upon the interpreter's work.

=== Medical ===
Medical interpreting is a subset of public service interpreting, consisting of communication among healthcare personnel and the patient and their family or among healthcare personnel speaking different languages, facilitated by an interpreter, usually formally educated and qualified to provide such interpretation services. In some situations, medical employees who are multilingual may participate part-time as members of internal language banks. Depending on country/state-specific requirements, the interpreter is often required to have some knowledge of medical terminology, common procedures, the patient interview and exam process. Medical interpreters are often cultural liaisons for people (regardless of language) who are unfamiliar with or uncomfortable in hospital, clinical, or medical settings.

For example, in China, there is no mandatory certificate for medical interpreters as of 2012. Most interpretation in hospitals in China is done by doctors, who are proficient in both Chinese and English (mostly) in his/her specialty. They interpret more in academic settings than for communications between doctors and patients. When a patient needs English language service in a Chinese hospital, more often than not the patient will be directed to a staff member in the hospital, who is recognized by his/her colleagues as proficient in English. The actual quality of such service for patients or medical interpretation for communications between doctors speaking different languages is unknown by the interpreting community as interpreters who lack Healthcare background rarely receive accreditation for medical interpretation in the medical community. Interpreters working in the Healthcare setting may be considered Allied Health Professionals.

In the United States, language access is a socioeconomic disparity, and language access to federally-funded health services is required by law. Title VI of the Civil Rights Act of 1964 prohibits discrimination on the basis of race, color, or national origin in any program or activity that receives Federal funds or other Federal financial assistance. Hospital systems and clinics that are funded by federal programs, such as Medicare, are required by this law to take reasonable steps towards ensuring equitable access to health services for limited English proficient patients.

=== Military interpreting ===
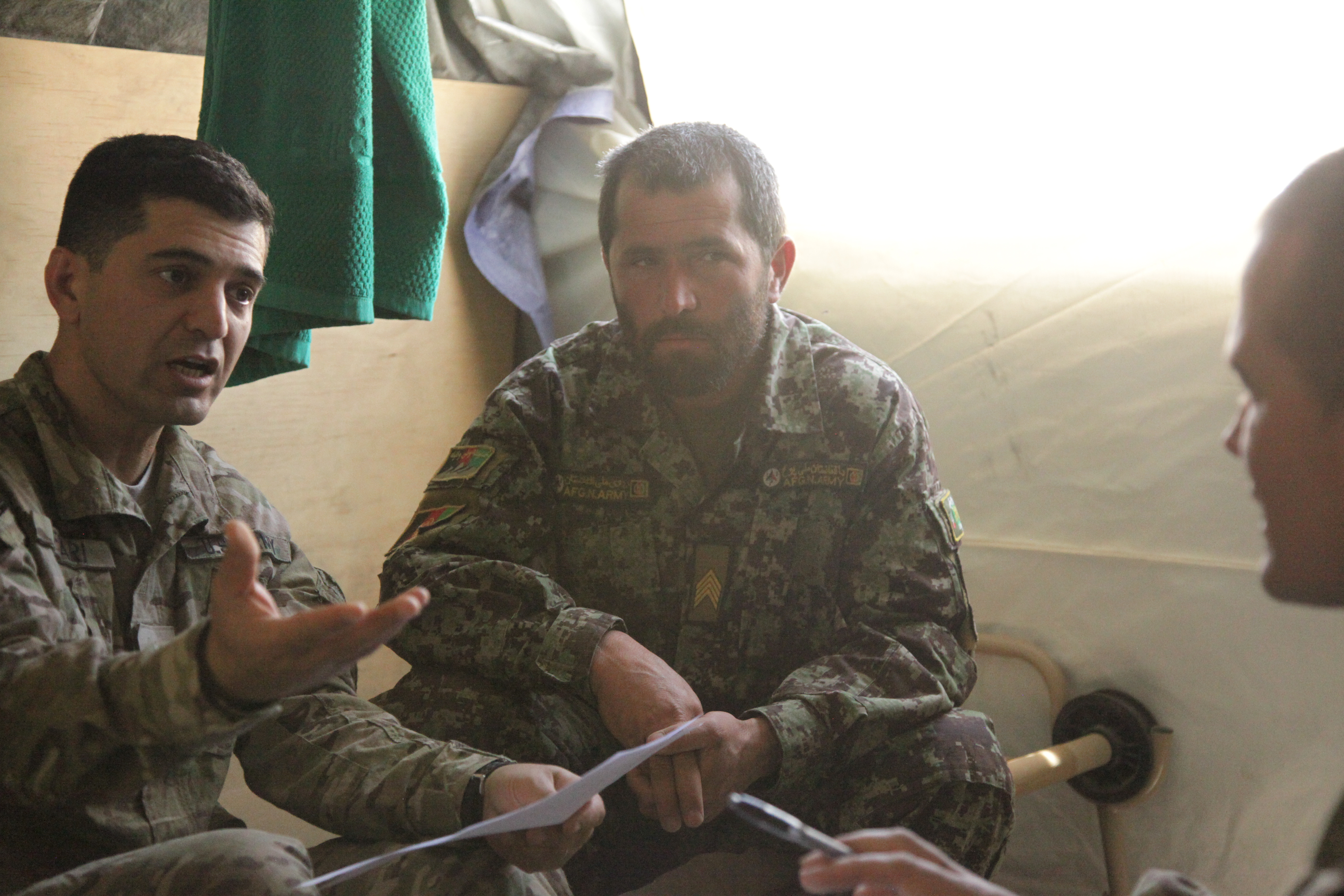
A US military interpreter sits with Afghan army soldiers, Ghazni province.

Interpreters are often used in a military context, carrying out interpretation usually either during active military combat or during noncombat operations. Interpretation is one of the main factors in multi-national and multi-lingual cooperation and military cohesion of the military and civilian populations.

During inactive military operations, the most common goal of military interpreters is to increase overall cohesion in the military unit, and with the civilian population. One of the primary forces behind the feeling of an occupation is a lack of mutual intelligibility. During the War in Afghanistan, the use of American soldiers that did not speak the languages of Afghanistan, and the primary recruitment from northern Afghanistan, primarily Tajiks, led to a feeling of the United States and Tajik forces as an occupying force. This feeling was most common in majority Pashtun areas of the country, which in turn was one of the main causes of the Taliban's resurgence. If interpreters are not present inside war zones, it becomes extremely common for misunderstandings from the civilian population and a military force to spiral into an open conflict, or to produce animosity and distrust, forming the basis of a conflict or an insurgency.

Military interpreters are commonly found in Iraq and have been largely effective, particularly in the Kurdish held regions (Kurdistan Regional Government), during the fighting against ISIS. Military interpreters were the primary drivers in cooperation between the coalition and the Iraqi population and military. Likewise managing to produce stability in areas held by the coalition, Kurdish interpreters were known for being a primary aid in this endeavour.

The fundamental act of interpreting during active combat is extremely stressful and dangerous. It is, however, necessary when different-language battalions are fighting together with no common intermediate language. Misunderstandings in this context are most often fatal, the most common misinterpretations are positioning and attempted break outs. In the chaos of combat, however, it can be very easy to make a mistake in interpreting, particularly with the immense noise and changing locations.

Military interpreters are also used within single armies instead of multi-lingual cooperation. In this context, a military interpreter is usually a given job in each unit. Common examples include Bosnia, Pakistan, Switzerland, and South Africa. This use of assigning soldiers with different languages to a single battalion helps reinforce a feeling of unity in the military force.

For an historical example, see also Linguistics and translations in the Austro-Hungarian Army.

=== Sign language ===
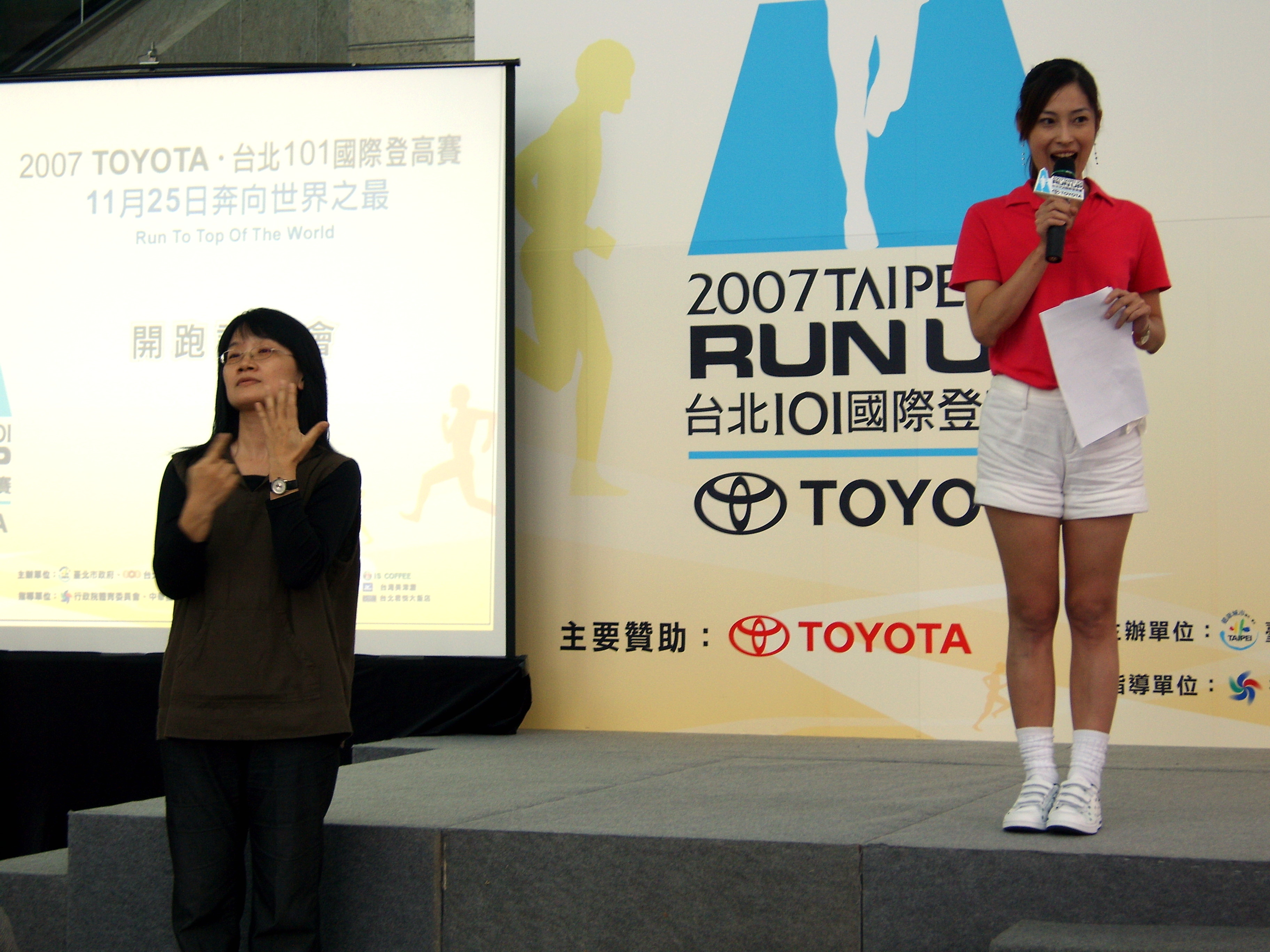
The hostess (in red) and a sign language interpreter at a press conference in Taipei, 2007

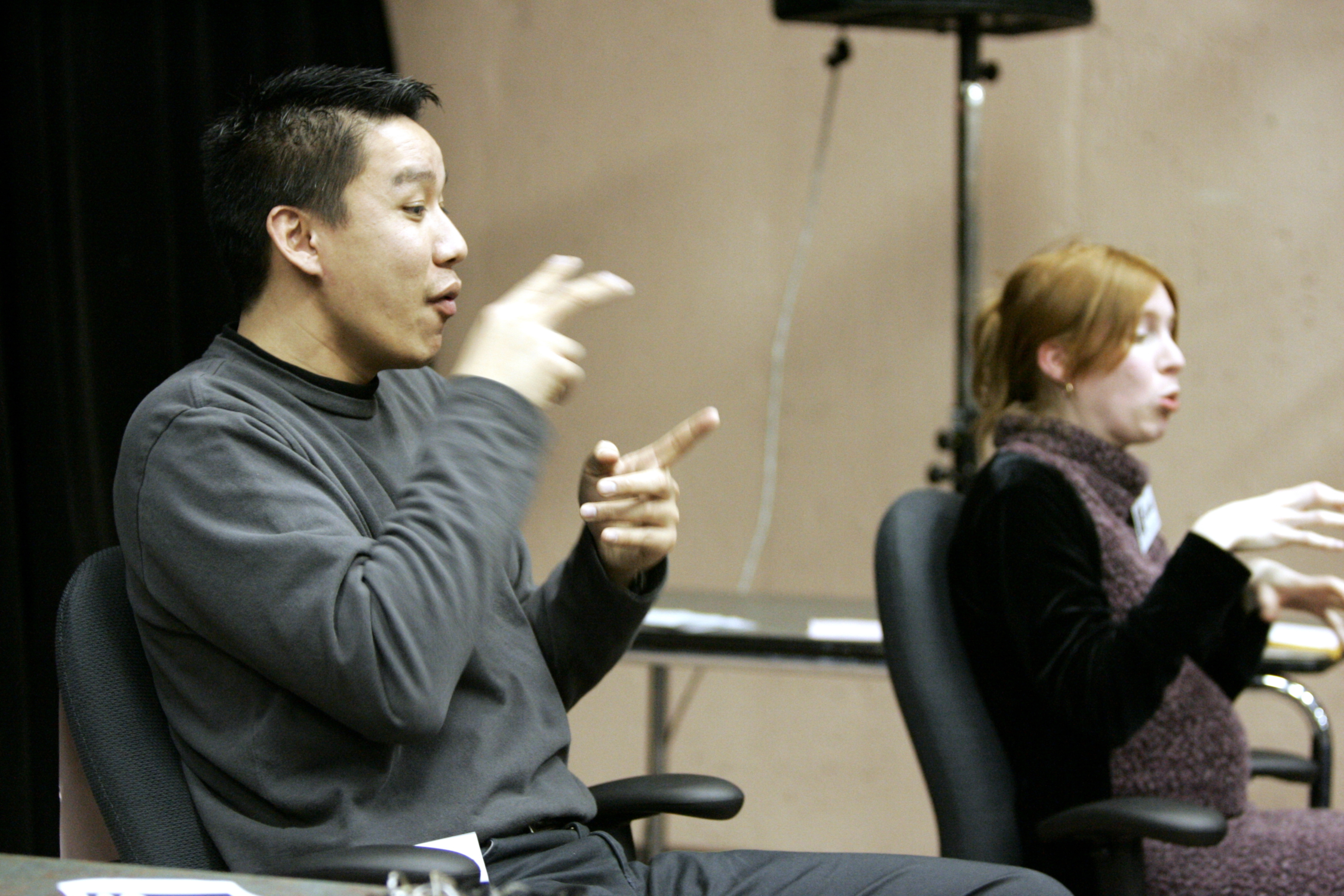
Two sign language interpreters working for a school, 2007

A sign language interpreter conveys messages between combinations of spoken and signed languages and manual systems. This may be between deaf signers and hearing nonsigners, or among users of different signed languages and manual systems. This may be done in simultaneous or consecutive modes, or as sight translation from printed text.

Interpreters may be hearing, hard of hearing, or deaf, and work in teams of any combination, depending upon the circumstance or audience. Historically, deaf interpreters or DIs work with deafblind people who use either close vision or protactile signing, deaf people with nonstandard, emerging, or idiolect language varieties, affinity or cultural groups within the deaf community, minors, immigrants of a different signed language, users of a minority signed language, participants in medical, carceral, or legal matters, and persons with cognitive or intellectual disabilities. DIs may work in relay teams with hearing interpreters, from a teleprompter, or with another DI to access the source language. DIs are commonly the member of the team visible on camera or on stage at televised, recorded, or public events.

Interpreters can be formally trained in postsecondary programs and receive a certificate, associates, bachelors, masters, or doctoral degree. In some circumstances, lay interpreters take an experiential route through churches, families, and social networks. Formal interpreter education practices are largely the product of twentieth-century developments.

In the United States, sign language interpreters have national- and some states have state-level certifications. The Registry of Interpreters for the Deaf (RID), a non-profit organization, is known for its national recognition and certification process. In addition to training requirements and stringent certification testing, RID members must abide by a Code of Professional Conduct, Grievance Process and Continuing Education Requirement. There are many interpreter-training programs in the U.S. The Collegiate Commission on Interpreter Education is the body that accredits Interpreter Preparation Programs. A list of accredited programs can be found on the CCIE web site.

Some countries have more than one national association due to regional or language differences. National associations can become members of the umbrella organizations, the World Association of Sign Language Interpreters or the European Forum of Sign Language Interpreters (efsli). In Canada, the professional association that recognizes and nationally certifies sign language interpreters is the Association of Visual Language Interpreters of Canada (AVLIC). Under AVLIC holds several affiliate chapters representing a specified region of Canada.

Sign language interpreters encounter a number of linguistic, environmental, interpersonal and intrapersonal factors that can have an effect on their ability to provide accurate interpretation. Studies have found that most interpreter training programs do not sufficiently prepare students for the highly variable day-to-day stresses that an interpreter must manage, and there is an ongoing conversation in the interpreting field as to how to appropriately prepare students for the challenges of the job. Proposed changes include having a more robust definition of what a qualified interpreter should know, as well as a post-graduate internship structure that would allow new interpreters to work with the benefit of supervision from more experienced interpreters, much like the programs in place in medicine, law enforcement, etc.

In Israel, Naama Weiss, a board member of Malach, the Organization of the Israeli Sign Language Interpreters, advertised a video which she produced. It was her paraphrase of the video So-Low, and showed her viewpoint upon the Israeli Sign Language interpreters' jobs. A study which was made in Finland found that, in comparison to the foreign language teachers and non-linguistic experts, a high cooperativeness was found to be more characteristic to simultaneous and consecutive interpreters, and Weiss showed it in her video, although she claimed to be comic.

The World Federation of the Deaf asserts that computer-generated signing avatars "do not surpass the natural quality and skill provided by appropriately trained and qualified interpreters," and approves their application only "for pre-recorded static customer information, for example, in hotels or train stations". The WFD statement concedes to such a project only if "deaf people have been involved in advising," and it does not intend to replace human interpreters. Quality and naturalness of movements are closely critiqued by sign-fluent viewers, particularly those who began signing at a younger age.

=== Media ===
By its very nature, media interpreting has to be conducted in the simultaneous mode. It is provided particularly for live television coverages such as press conferences, live or taped interviews with political figures, musicians, artists, sportsmen or people from the business circle. In this type of interpreting, the interpreter has to sit in a sound-proof booth where ideally he/she can see the speakers on a monitor and the set. All equipment should be checked before recording begins. In particular, satellite connections have to be double-checked to ensure that the interpreter's voice is not sent back and the interpreter gets to hear only one channel at a time. In the case of interviews recorded outside the studio and some current affairs program, the interpreter interprets what they hear on a TV monitor. Background noise can be a serious problem. The interpreter working for the media has to sound as slick and confident as a television presenter.

Media interpreting has gained more visibility and presence especially after the Gulf War. Television channels have begun to hire staff simultaneous interpreters. The interpreter renders the press conferences, telephone beepers, interviews and similar live coverage for the viewers. It is more stressful than other types of interpreting as the interpreter has to deal with a wide range of technical problems coupled with the control room's hassle and wrangling during live coverage.

== Modalities ==
Interpreting services can be delivered in multiple modalities. The most common modality through which interpreting services are provided is on-site interpreting.

=== On-site ===
Also called "in-person" and "face-to-face" or "F2F" interpreting, this traditional method requires the interpreter be physically present. With the growth of remote settings, having interpreters on-site remains crucial in high-stakes medical, legal, and diplomatic situations, and with socially, intellectually, or emotionally vulnerable clients.

=== Telephone ===
Also referred to as "over-the-phone interpreting", "telephonic interpreting", and "tele-interpreting", telephone interpreting enables interpretation via telephone. Telephone interpreting can be used in community settings as well as conference settings. Telephone interpreting may be used in place of on-site interpreting when no on-site interpreter is readily available at the location where services are needed. However, it is more commonly used for situations in which all parties who wish to communicate are already speaking to one another via telephone (e.g. telephone applications for insurance or credit cards, or telephone inquiries from consumers to businesses).

=== Video ===
Interpretation services via video remote interpreting (VRI) or a video relay service (VRS) are useful for spoken language barriers where visual-cultural recognition is relevant, and even more applicable where one of the parties is deaf, hard-of-hearing or speech-impaired (mute). In such cases the direction of interpretation is normally within the same principal language, such as French Sign Language (FSL) to spoken French and Spanish Sign Language (SSL) to spoken Spanish. Multilingual sign language interpreters, who can also interpret as well across principal languages (such as to and from SSL, to and from spoken English), are also available, albeit less frequently. Such activities involve considerable effort on the part of the interpreter, since sign languages are distinct natural languages with their own construction and syntax, different from the aural version of the same principal language.

With video interpreting, sign language interpreters work remotely with live video and audio feeds, so that the interpreter can see the deaf or mute party, converse with the hearing party and vice versa. Much like telephone interpreting, video interpreting can be used for situations in which no on-site interpreters are available. However, video interpreting cannot be used for situations in which all parties are speaking via telephone alone. VRI and VRS interpretation requires all parties to have the necessary equipment. Some advanced equipment enables interpreters to control the video camera, in order to zoom in and out, and to point the camera toward the party that is signing.

== Venues ==
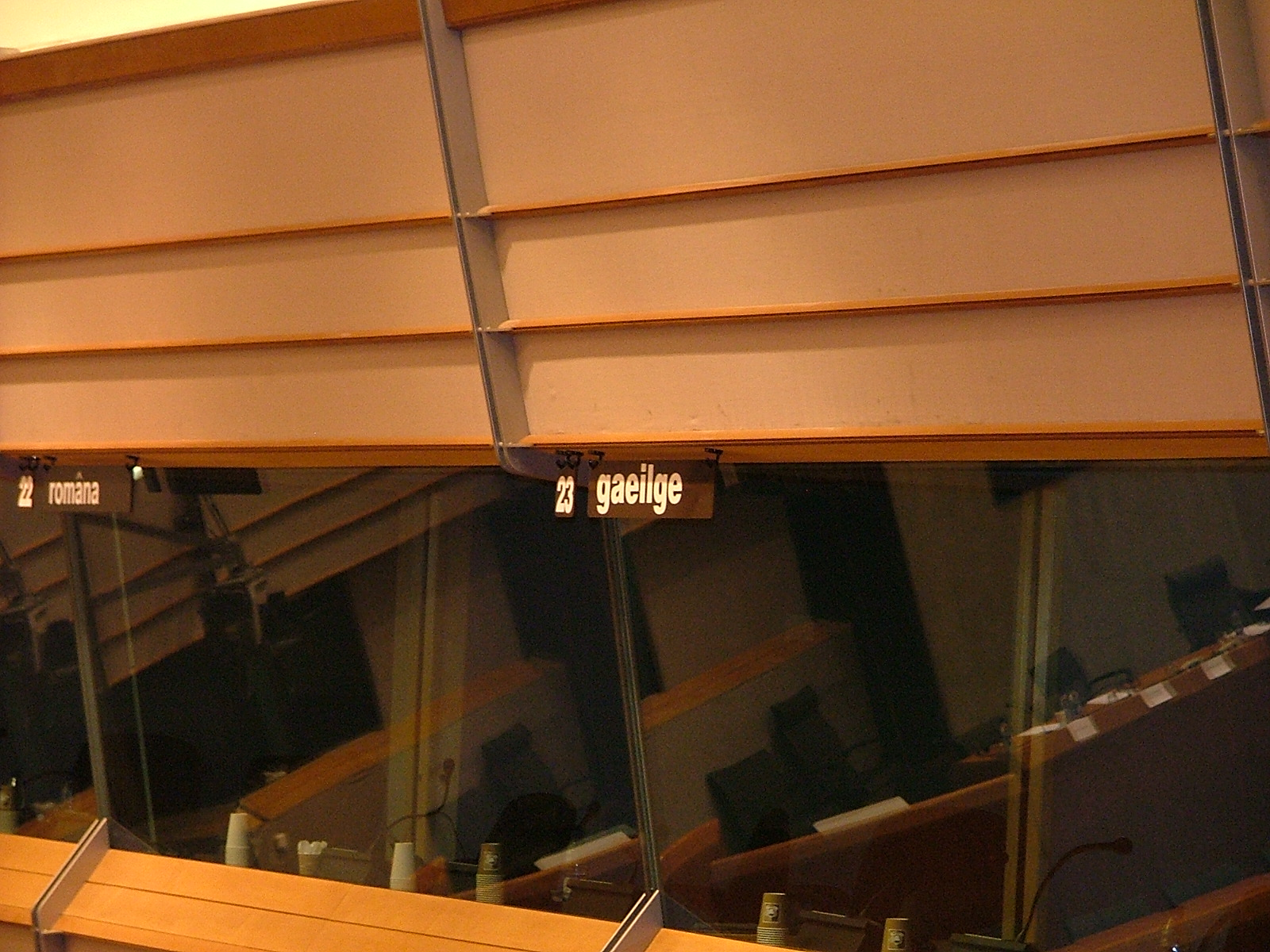
Interpreting booths in the European Parliament where interpreters simultaneously interpret debates between the 24 official languages of the European Union

The majority of professional full-time conference interpreters work for phone interpreting agencies, health care institutions, courts, school systems and international organizations like the United Nations (for the United Nations Interpretation Service), the European Union, or the African Union.

The world's largest employer of interpreters is currently the European Commission, which employs hundreds of staff and freelance interpreters working into the official languages of the European Union and some others in DG Interpretation. In 2016, Florika Fink-Hooijer was appointed as Director General and the first ever Knowledge Centre on Interpretation was created. She had spoken about the need to "futureproof" services by strengthening the skills of colleagues to work with new technologies as well as how artificial intelligence may be an (un)desired revolution in linguistic services. Subsequently, she drove forward the digitalization of the service by introducing features like automatic speech recognition and other support services to interpreters. During the COVID-19 pandemic, she scaled up multilingual interpretation in hybrid meetings via new digital platforms and technologies, which was a "watershed moment" for the interpretation profession.

The European Union's other institutions (the European Parliament and the European Court of Justice) have smaller interpreting services.

The United Nations employs interpreters at almost all its sites throughout the world. Because it has only six official languages, however, it is a smaller employer than the European Union.

Interpreters may also work as freelance operators in their local, regional and national communities, or may take on contract work under an interpreting business or service. They would typically take on work as described above.

Militaries often use interpreters to better communicate with the local population. One notable example is the US military during the war in Iraq and Afghanistan.

== Associations ==
There are a number of interpreting and translation associations around the world, including the National Accreditation Authority for Translators and Interpreters, the International Association of Conference Interpreters, the China Accreditation Test for Translators and Interpreters, the Canadian Translators, the Terminologists and Interpreters Council, the Institute of Translation and Interpreting, the Argentine Association of Conference Interpreters, and the American Association of Language Specialists.

== Certifications ==
No worldwide testing or certification agency exists for all types of interpreters. For conference interpretation, there is the International Association of Conference Interpreters.

Specific regions, countries, or even cities will have their own certification standards. In many cases, graduates of a certain caliber university program acts as a de facto certification for conference interpretation.

=== China ===
The most recognized interpretation and translation certificate in the People's Republic of China is the China Accreditation Test for Translation and Interpretation (CATTI). Entrusted by China's Ministry of Human Resources and Social Security, it is a translation and interpretation professional qualification accreditation test that is implemented throughout the country according to uniform standards, in order to assess examinees' bilingual translation or interpretation capability. CATTI was introduced in 2003. In later 2013, translation and interpreting tests of different levels in English, French, Japanese, Russian, German, Spanish and Arabic were held across the nation.

Those examinees who pass CATTI and obtain translation and interpretation certificates acquire corresponding translation and interpretation professional titles.

- Senior translator or interpreter – professor of translation or interpretation
- Level 1 translator or interpreter – associate professor of translation or interpretation
- Level 2 translator or interpreter – translator or interpreter
- Level 3 translator or interpreter – assistant translator or interpreter

Relevant institutions from Australia, France, Japan, the Republic of Korea, Singapore and other countries as well as Hong Kong Special Administrative Region and Taiwan have established work ties with CATTI.

=== Germany ===
In Germany, anyone can become and call themselves an interpreter; access to this profession is not regulated, but court interpreters must be sworn in and prove their qualifications, e.g. through a recognized certificate or professional experience of several years.

In order to learn and practice the necessary skills, colleges and universities offer studies in Translation and/or Interpretation Studies, primarily to/from English, but there are also Sign Language Interpretation studies. Admission to higher education, however, is highly restricted.

Some states offer a State Examination title Staatlich geprüfter Dolmetscher. Unlike a bachelor's or master's degree, this certificate merely certifies professional skills. Access to the exam is far easier, but requires proof of the necessary skills. For that, there are private schools that offer preparatory courses. Attending these schools is usually sufficient to prove someone's aptitude. Of course, a university or college degree is accepted, too.

Furthermore, the State Examination is offered in many more languages, including German Sign Language, yet primarily to/from German.

=== United States ===
The United States differentiates between spoken language and sign language interpretation. For spoken language the current standard of education required by most organizations to work as an interpreter is a certificate from a 40 hour course. Most courses include modules on interpreter ethics and techniques.

There are two national organizations that provide an additional credential, called national certification: the National Board for Certified Medical Interpreters or NBCMI and the Certification Commission for Healthcare Interpreters or CCHI. To be eligible for national certification, candidates must prove their age, fluency in English plus one working language, their level of education (minimally a GED or equivalent), and completion of the 40 hour certificate course.

For ASL (American Sign Language) interpretation the national certifying body is the RID or Registry of Interpreters for the Deaf.

== See also ==
- Interpreting notes
- Cf., Literal translation
- List of translators and interpreters associations
