= International Federation of Translators =

French professional association

The International Federation of Translators (French: Fédération Internationale des Traducteurs, FIT; Spanish: Federación Internacional de Traductores) is an international federation of associations of translators, interpreters and terminologists working in areas as diverse as literary, scientific and technical, public service, court and legal settings, conference interpreting, media and diplomatic fields and academia.

FIT supports members and the profession at an international level, building community, visibility and a sustainable future for the profession. With more than 100 professional associations affiliated, FIT represents over 80,000 translators in 65 countries. The goal of the Federation is to promote professionalism in the disciplines which it represents. The organisation aims to improve conditions for the profession in all countries and to uphold translators' rights and freedom of expression.

FIT has consultative status with UNESCO, The United Nations and has close relationships with other UN organs such as the World Intellectual Property Organisation.

== International Translation Day ==
International Translation Day, also known as 'ITD', has been an important date celebrated in the FIT calendar for over 35 years. Each year FIT Council selects an annual theme as the basis for the celebrations.

Since 2017, 30 September has been internationally recognised as International Translation Day, an official UN International Day to be celebrated across the entire UN global network. It honours the contribution of professional translators, interpreters and terminologists in connecting nations, and fostering peace and global development and emphasises translation’s important political and cultural role in multilateralism and multilingualism.

The theme of ITD 2024 was "Translation, an art worth protecting". This theme calls for the translation community to protect translation as an art, to protect copyright and related rights, and to protect professional livelihoods, thereby ensuring the future and sustainability of our profession.

== Committees ==
The Federation, through its Standing Committees and Regional Centre Committees, undertakes projects to meet the various expectations of its members by addressing matters of training, professional standing and support for the community of translators, interpreters and terminologists.

== Governing bodies ==
The Federation's supreme body is the Statutory Congress, which is held every three years. It brings together delegations from FIT member associations and elects the FIT Council, which oversees FIT activity until the next statutory congress.

The governing bodies are supported by the various standing committees, which report to the council annually about their activities, and to the congress.

== FIT Events ==
The FIT World Congress and Statutory Congress

Every three years, FIT invites all stakeholders in the community to its Congresses. The FIT Statutory Congress runs for two days and is attended by representatives of member associations who wish to nominate and attend. The statutory congress is followed by a three-day open congress, which serves as a platform for exchanges among all stakeholders in the profession, with keynote speeches, presentations and round table discussions.

== Publications and public relations ==
The academic journal BABEL and the Translatio newsletter are the Federation's quarterly publications, and are disseminated. Translatio informs FIT members about community activities and those of the FIT committees and events. The proceedings of each congress are also published, and serve as a further source of valuable information to those interested in the many facets of the translation profession.

In addition, between its congresses, FIT participates in the organization of webinars, seminars, colloquia and panel discussions on various aspects of the profession. FIT also supports its members' activities. The annual Council meetings are hosted by a FIT member association, to allow members to interact with FIT Council and to enable FIT to engage with the individual members of the profession in those countries.

== Secretariat ==
FIT administration is assisted by a part-time secretariat.

== See also ==
- List of translators and interpreters associations
