= Japanese Network of the Institute of Translation and Interpreting =

The Japanese Network of the Institute of Translation and Interpreting (J-Net) is a professional network of translators and interpreters, a division of the Institute of Translation and Interpreting (ITI) in the United Kingdom.

== Activities ==
J-Net was established in 1986, the same year as the ITI. J-Net acts as a reference point for translators and interpreters working to and from Japanese to exchange ideas, offer work and get help with language-related problems. In the early years the main means of communication was the network Bulletin, printed and distributed to all members and some overseas 'sister organization' subscribers such as the Japan Association of Translators and the Japan Language Division of the American Translators Association. Over the years this forum has largely been supplanted by an active online mailing list (up to 400+ messages a month), which also maintains archives going back to 1999. The Bulletin is still produced approximately twice a year, primarily as an online publication, and there are also regular CPD and social events such as Shinnenkai, often combined with the annual general meeting. J-Net has also hosted the International Japanese-English Translation conference on three occasions: IJET-8 (Sheffield, 1997), IJET-18 (Bath, 2007) and IJET-26 (York, 2015).

== Membership ==
J-Net's membership includes some 80 ITI-affiliated professional translators and interpreters, working primarily between the English and Japanese languages, although some also offer combinations such as English/German or French/Japanese. A comprehensive printed directory of members used to be sent regularly to potential work providers both in the UK and overseas.

In June 1994, a new category of 'Friend' was introduced to formalize those who had previously been known as 'subscriber' members. The AGM decided that "Friends of the Network will be entitled to receive the Bulletin and Directory and attend meetings. They will not be included in the Directory and will not be entitled to vote.". Gradually this category expanded to include those who had not yet qualified for ITI membership but wanted to gain experience from their Senpai while preparing to take the ITI entrance exam. The number of 'Friends' has now grown to approximately the same level as that of full J-Net Members.

Most members are based in the UK, but some are located overseas, in over 12 countries (including Japan). Full J-Net membership is open to any ITI member (in whatever category) with an interest translation and/or interpreting to and/or from Japanese, while 'Friend' membership is open to other linguists with similar interests, as well as students aiming to achieve professional status.

== Organization ==
While J-Net is a subsidiary organization of the ITI and hence governed by ITI's constitution and bylaws, as well as ITI's internal rules on Networks and Regional Groups, it has its own constitution. The network is led by a Coordinator, who must be ITI-affiliated and whose primary task is to "oversee the smooth running of the Network", supported by other officials including Treasurer, Membership Secretary, Bulletin Editor, Professional Development Officer and Webmaster. All posts are limited to up to three years at any one time (but reappointment later is possible), and used to rotate alphabetically to ensure all members became actively involved, although as the network has grown, a volunteer/election system has become more prevalent. The Coordinators since the founding have been as follows:

| From | To | Name |
|---|---|---|
| 1986 | 1991 | Victor Schenk |
| 1992 | 1994 | Simon Prentis |
| 1994 | 1996 | Masako Coxall |
| 1997 | 1998 | Kazumi Honda |
| 1999 | 2001 | Ben Jones |
| 2002 | 2004 | Kimiko Kameoka-Eva |
| 2005 | 2007 | Atsuko Kato |
| 2008 | 2010 | Matt Young |
| 2011 | 2013 | Jules Tuff |
| 2014 | 2016 | Rie Hiramatsu |
| 2017 | 2019 | Haruko Uchishiba |
| 2020 | 2022 | Matt Young |
| 2023 | [current] | Natasha Lutes |

== See also ==
List of Japanese interpreting and translation associations
