= List of UK interpreting and translation associations =

There are numerous associations within the United Kingdom aiming in various ways to assist local translators, interpreters and/or translation/interpreting companies/agencies, as shown below (in approximate order of age).

== General organizations ==
- Chartered Institute of Linguists (CIOL)

Charity founded 1910; around 7,000 members. Name changed from IoL to CIOL in 2005.

- Translators' Guild (defunct)

Former part of the IoL; broke away to form the ITI (see below).

- Association of Translation Companies (ATC)

Founded in 1976; around 180 member companies.

- Cymdeithas Cyfieithwyr Cymru (CCC; previously known as the Association of Welsh Translators and Interpreters, AWTI)

Founded in 1976; around 140 members, of whom 75% are translators.

- Institute of Translation and Interpreting (ITI)

Private Limited Company by guarantee without share capital use of 'Limited' exemption, founded in 1986; over 3000 members.

- Association of Qualified Translators and Interpreters (AQTI)

Founded in 2013 to "bring professionals and users of translators and interpreters together". In 2016 became ACCI (see below) - website dead since that time (archive copy)

- Association of Interpreters and Translators (AIT)

Not to be confused with the Asylum and Immigration Tribunal (see below). Founded as company in October 2019 "to seek protection of title [and] ensure the regulation of the profession". Website ("ait-professionals.com") never set up, but active on Facebook, LinkedIn, Instagram (largely reverted to personal content) and (Skilliga).

- Police Approved Interpreters and Translators (PAIT)

A scheme introduced by the National Police Chiefs' Council in 2021, for interpreters and translators carrying out police assignments across England and Wales. See NPCC explanation.

== Primarily for translators (written) ==
- Translators Association (TA)

Trade union founded in 1958, as part of the Society of Authors. For literary translators.

- National Register of Public Service Translators (NRPST)

Founded as sister organization to NRPSI (see below) in 2019. See https://www.nrpst.org.uk/

== Primarily for interpreters (spoken) ==
- Association of Police and Court Interpreters (APCI)

Founded 1974. See https://www.apciinterpreters.org.uk/

- National Register of Public Service Interpreters (NRPSI)

See https://www.nrpsi.org.uk/ An independent regulator for interpreters working with public services, founded in 1994 and administered by the CIOL until 2011. Around 2000 registrants. See also NRPST (above) and SPSI (below).

- National Union of Professional Interpreters and Translators (NUPIT)

Founded in 2001. Part of Unite, the largest trade union in the UK; around 100 members. See http://www.unitetheunion.org/nupit

- Society of Official Metropolitan Interpreters UK Ltd (SOMI UK Ltd)

Formed in 2009 to represent Metropolitan Police interpreters. Its purpose is to make representations on behalf of its members, to advocate for their rights and interests, and to liaise and negotiate with work providers and official bodies. See https://www.somiukltd.com/

- Professional Interpreters' Alliance (PIA)

Founded in 2009 (incorporated in 2010) primarily due to concern about the effect of arrangements between Applied Language Solutions and certain police forces regarding the hiring of interpreters. Around 300 members. Website profintal.org (previously profintal.org.uk and rpsi.name) now defunct: instead see PI4J below.

- Society for Public Service Interpreting (SPSI) (defunct)

Formed in April 2011 as successor to some of the functions of the NRPSI. Website dead since 2013 (archive copy)

- Professional Interpreters for Justice (PI4J/PIJ)

Umbrella group formed in 2012 by 10 interpreters’ organizations to campaign against the new Ministry of Justice framework agreement for public service interpreting. See https://pi4j.org.uk/ (also NUPIT page and X).

- Association of Certified Interpreters (ACCI)

Successor to AQTI, renamed in 2016 as a "global not-for-profit body for professional interpreters" (but still clearly UK-centric). Website effectively defunct after 2021 (archive copy)

- Association of Community Interpreters (ACIS)

Founded in c. 2022. See https://www.acis-uk.org/

== Sign language and Lipspeakers ==
- Scottish Association of Sign Language Interpreters (SASLI)

Founded in 1981, becoming independent the next year. Around 50 members (registered British Sign Language/English interpreters). Holds the public register of BSL/English Interpreters for Scotland. See http://www.sasli.co.uk/

- National Registers of Communication Professionals working with Deaf and Deafblind People (NRCPD)

Registers used since 1982, although only formally founded in 2009. Administered by Signature (previously CACDP, the Council for the Advancement of Communication with Deaf People). Operates the Registered Sign Language Interpreter (RSLI) scheme. See https://www.nrcpd.org.uk/

- Association of Sign Language Interpreters (ASLI)

Founded in 1987, and formerly administered from the same premises as ITI. Around 500 members. See https://www.asli.org.uk/

- Visual Language Professionals (VLP)

Founded in 2010. Includes not only sign language interpreters but also deafblind communicators, BSL/English translators and lipspeakers. See https://www.vlp.org.uk/

- National Union of British Sign Language Interpreters (NUBSLI)

Founded in 2014 as part of Unite, to represent BSL/English interpreters/translators. Represents approximately 30% of registered BSL interpreters in the UK. See https://nubsli.com

- Association of Lipspeakers (ALS)

The ALS is the professional body that represents lipspeakers in the UK. We aim to promote lipspeaking and its good practice, and encourage the further development of lipspeaking as a communication service. See https://www.lipspeaking.co.uk

- British Sign Language Legal (BSL Legal)

See https://bsllegal.org/

== Tourist guides ==
Not all Blue Badge tourist guides have to have interpreting skills, but many do, taking language exams administered by the Institute of Tourist Guiding and tested to CIOL or Foreign and Commonwealth Office standards.

- Guild of Registered Tourist Guides (GRTG)

Founded in 1950 as the Guild of Guide Lecturers (renamed in 1995). Over 1700 members. See https://www.britainsbestguides.org

- Association of Professional Tourist Guides (APTG)

An autonomous group within Unite, partly rebranded as Guide London. Around 470 members. See https://www.guidelondon.org.uk/ (previously http://www.touristguides.org.uk/). Date of founding unclear: '1980', 'the 1980s', '1998' or '2000'.

- Scottish Tourist Guides Association (STGA)

Over 400 members. Date of founding unclear: 'over 50 years ago' or '1996'. See http://www.stga.co.uk/

== Miscellaneous ==
- Asylum and Immigration Tribunal (AIT; previously the Immigration Appellate Authority) Interpreters Panel

Not strictly a professional association, although sometimes described that way. The AIT became part of a unified Tribunals framework (see tribunals.gov.uk, although in 2011 this merged with HM Courts Service to form HM Courts & Tribunals Service). What is now the Central Interpreters Unit (CIU) was established in September 2000, with a central database used by ports and UK Visas & Immigration (UKVI) agency offices, and a remit that does include interpreter training.

- International Association of Conference Interpreters (AIIC)

Founded 1953. Not UK-centric, but lists over 130 interpreters based in the UK / Ireland (as part of a global network of 3000).

== See also ==
- List of professional associations in the United Kingdom
- List of Japanese interpreting and translation associations
