= Nomikai =

Japanese drinking party phenomenon

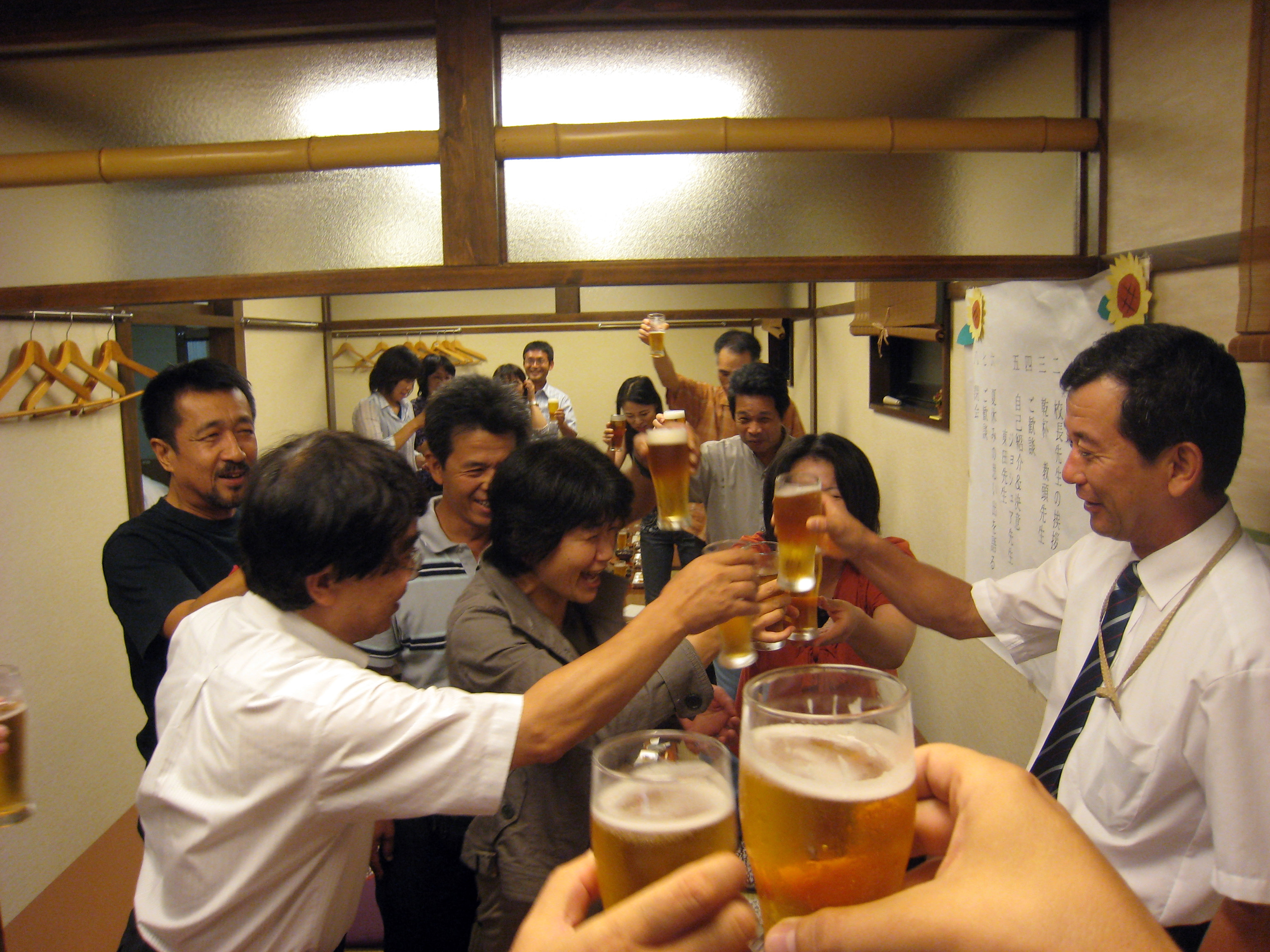
A group of Japanese people in Kumamoto begin to drink

A nomikai (Japanese: 飲み会) is a type of drinking party popular in Japanese culture. Nomikai are a part of the culture of most places of employment, from schools to nightclubs. They are most often held in restaurants or izakaya, usually with everyone seated at one large table or occupying a separated section of the venue.

Employees are usually expected to participate to some extent in various nomikai, as it is considered a social aspect of work, although it is not expressly required. Such parties focus on the bond between coworkers as a group, and are not considered private or somehow non-work related (see Japanese values). Attendance does not necessarily imply that a person will drink any alcohol, however, and attendees generally pay a set amount for the food, drink, and venue regardless of consumption. Any leftover money may be put toward organizing the next nomikai.

The student version of the nomikai is called a konpa and contains some distinguishing characteristics.

== Procedure ==
Nomikai are held to mark a wide range of events, including completion of major projects, attainment of set goals, foundation anniversaries, school sporting events, entry of new coworkers, and retirement of senior employees. There is always at least one organizer (幹事) responsible for the preparation of the venue. This is usually not the same person or persons for whom the nomikai takes place.

With the exception of the end of year bōnenkai (忘年会; forget the year party) and New Years party (新年会, shinnenkai), most nomikai consist of workers in one section or department of the workplace. In the case of the bōnenkai and Shinnenkai, everyone in the entire company may be present. In large companies, however, separate bōnenkais and Shinnenkai are often the norm for each department. Additionally, there may be both kinds of bōnenkai and Shinnenkai on separate dates. For example, there may be a math department bōnenkai and Shinnenkai on one day, with a school-wide bōnenkai and Shinnenkai for all teachers the following week.

At onset of the nomikai, the organizers give a brief welcome speech, followed by the manager, president, or principal, who offers words of reflection and encouragement. The monologue is punctuated by a toast after which everyone begins eating and drinking. If there are new employees or guests at the nomikai, it is customary for them also to give a self-introduction and salutation to the other members.

Nomikai are nearly always concluded after a few hours by everyone standing, clapping in unison. There are two main styles of clapping: ippon-jime and sanbon-jime. These translate roughly to "one-clap ending" and "three-clap ending", respectively. A three-clap ending is actually three series of three claps, followed by a single clap. Often this is repeated three times, leaving the total number of claps at thirty. Sometimes the shime (ending) may happen in conjunction with a verbose salute to the organizer or honored participant, or the singing of the company or school song.

The nijikai (二次会) is the afterparty. After the main nomikai is concluded, the attendees often break into smaller groups and move to different bars. As attendance is not at all mandatory for nijikai, they usually are groups of friends or people interested in doing a lot of drinking, including bar-hopping. Drinking that comes after a nijikai is referred to as sanjikai (三次会). 'Ni' means two and 'San' means three in Japanese. The meanings of 'Niji' and 'Sanji' are secondary and tertiary, respectively.

== Nomikai etiquette ==
During nomikai there are rules of etiquette which are generally followed. Generally, one tries to avoid filling one's own glass, but instead offers to fill others' for them. This is especially true of senpai-kōhai relationships, where the participant of lower rank or age will first offer to serve his superior. This relationship is often reciprocal, and the superior will offer to fill the junior's glass in return. This is not perceived so much as currying favor as it is seen as acting in a manner conducive to workplace harmony (see Wa).

Another point of etiquette which differs from Western business culture is that it is considered acceptable to become drunk at nomikai. In the same vein, things said and done under such circumstances are not taken seriously, but are forgiven or ignored upon return to the workplace. Consequently, there are sometimes frank and emotional displays between coworkers, regardless of rank, which may not occur in a normal workplace context. This phenomenon is called bureikō (無礼講) in Japanese.

On the other hand, it is generally regarded as unacceptable to pressure people into drinking alcohol or consuming more of it than they want. Participants may drink non-alcoholic beverages or leave a glass full to signal that they are not willing to drink any (more) alcohol.

== See also ==
- Konpa

== Related terms ==
- Enkai (宴会) means banquet, and is often used as a general term to refer to a nomikai or bōnenkai.
