= List of A Town Where You Live chapters =

A Town Where You Live (君のいる町, Kimi no Iru Machi) is a Japanese manga written and illustrated by Kouji Seo. The series is a character-driven romance set in the same universe and time period as the manga and anime series, Suzuka. It follows Haruto Kirishima, a self-conscious teenage boy, and Yuzuki Eba, a boisterous teenage girl who has moved from Tokyo into the Kirishima family's hometown.

A Town Where You Live was published as a series in the Japanese magazine Weekly Shōnen Magazine, which has been published by Kodansha since June 2008. As of January 2014, Kodansha has compiled its chapters into 26 bound volumes. The final chapter was released on February 12, 2014, in the 11th issue of Weekly Shōnen Magazine, and the final volume was released on March 17, 2014.

On October 30, 2013, Crunchyroll Manga was launched and included A Town Where You Live in its library. The series was also published in several languages, including French and Chinese.

== Volume list ==
| No. | Japanese release date | Japanese ISBN |
|---|---|---|
| 1 | August 12, 2008 | 978-4-06-384029-2 |
1. "The Moment When Cherry Blossoms Bloom" (桜の咲く頃, "Sakura no Sakukoro"); 2. "You're Not Wearing Anything Seriously" (はいてない、マジ。, "Hai Tenai, Maji."); 3. "Wait At The Convenience Store, Okay?" (コンビニで待ってて, "Konbini de Mattete"); 4. "Why Don't You Try To Fall For Me Then" (好きになっちゃえば、いい。, "Suki ni Natchaeba, ī."); 5. "Mixed Bathing, It's Just A Joke" (混浴は、冗談だけど。, "Kon'yoku wa, Jōdan Dakedo."); 6. "An Unexpected Kiss Behind The Door" (突然、バタンチュー, "Totsuzen, Batonchū"); 7. "When Haruto Isn't Around" (青大がいないと, "Haruto ga Inaito"); 8. "Their Relationship" (ふたりの関係, "Futari no Kankei")
Yuzuki Eba moves from Tokyo to Shōbara, Hiroshima and moves in with Haruto Kirishima and his family for high school. Yuzuki adjusts to her life in the countryside and helps Haruto bond with his crush, Nanami Kanzaki. Yuzuki then kisses Haruto which leads Haruto to believe that she is flaunting herself, causing them to argue. After Yuzuki reveals she only loves Haruto, the two reconcile and continue their relationship.
| 2 | October 17, 2008 | 978-4-06-384055-1 |
9. "Big Misunderstanding" (大いなる誤解, "Ōinaru Gokai"); 10. "Declaration Of War" (宣戦布告, "Sensen Fukoku"); 11. "Akari's Love" (月の恋, "Akari no Koi"); 12. "Double Date Plan" (Wデート決行, "W Dēto Kekkō"); 13. "It's Time To Leave School" (下校時間に, "Gekō Jikan ni"); 14. "Alone With Who?" (誰と2人きり?, "Dare to Futari Kiri?"); 15. "An Unstoppable Force" (勢いは止まらない, "Ikioi wa Tomaranai"); 16. "Running Away Is Bad" (逃げるのよくない。, "Nigeru no ga Yokunai."); 17. "Honest Feelings" (正直な気持ち, "Shōjikina Kimochi"); 18. "Not Like Dating" (つき合うとかじゃなくて, "Tsukiau Toka Janakute")
Nanami believes that Haruto actually loves Yuzuki. Yuzuki then tells Nanami that she likes Haruto and will make him hers. Haruto's friend, Akari Kaga, asks Haruto to set up a double date with Nanami's brother, Narumi, and Haruto and Nanami. On the double date, Narumi let it be known that he likes Yuzuki. Haruto then asks Nanami out, but she wants to remain friends. Haruto remains committed to Nanami.
| 3 | January 16, 2009 | 978-4-06-384090-2 |
19. "The Town You Were In" (君がいた町, "Kimigaita Machi"); 20. "Sis' Welcome Party" (姉ちゃんの歓迎会, "Nēchan no Kangei-kai"); 21. "Email Reply" (メールのお返し, "Mēru no Okaeshi"); 22. "The Gloomy Yuzuki Chan" (ねくらなゆずきちゃん, "Ne Kurana Yuzuki-chan"); 23. "Summer Festival" (なつまつり, "Natsu Matsuri"); 24. "I Want You To Come" (来てほしい, "Kite Hoshī"); 25. "Wasting Your Time All Alone" (ひとりぼっちで待ちぼうけ, "Hitori Botchi de Machibōke"); 26. "At Sis' Room" (姉ちゃんの部屋で, "Nēchan no Heya de"); 27. "The True Rin" (懍の素顔, "Rin no Sugao"); 28. "A Cynical Smile And Rage" (冷笑と激昂, "Reishō to Gekikō"); Esp. "Pond Where The Nushi Are" (ヌシのいる池, "Nushi no Iru Ike")
Haruto finds a diary which reveals his first meeting with Yuzuki during a summer festival. He had told her to return to Shōbara if she doesn't like it. Nanami asks Haruto to go on a shopping date; however, when Yuzuki is asked to return to Tokyo for a funeral, Haruto instead accompanies Yuzuki and cancels his date with Nanami. In Tokyo, Yuzuki returns to her home, and Haruto meets Rin Eba, Yuzuki's younger step-sister. She tells Haruto that Yuzuki is estranged from the family.
| 4 | April 17, 2009 | 978-4-06-384127-5 |
29. "As Family" (家族とは, "Kazoku to Wa"); 30. "Going Home" (帰るね, "Kaeru ne"); 31. "The Eba Sisters" (枝葉姉妹, "Eba Shimai"); 32. "Their Closing Ceremony" (それぞれの終業式, "Sorezore no Shūgyō-Shiki"); 33. "Summer, Beach, Just the two of us" (夏、海、2人っきり。, "Natsu, Umi, 2-Rikkiri."); 34. "The Second Coming of Rin" (懍、再臨。, "Rin, Sarin."); 35. "I'll Cheer You On" (応援します, "Ōen Shimasu"); 36. "Surprise X 2" (サプライズ×2, "Sapuraizu × 2"); 37. "What He Kept Secret" (ヒミツにしたこと, "Himitsu ni Shita Koto"); 38. "Say It Clearly" (直接、言う。, "Chokusetsu, Iu.")
After finding Yuzuki and having her explain the situation, Haruto chastises Yuzuki's step-siblings about the situation. Haruto brings together Yuzuki and her step-siblings to reconcile. The two return to Shōbara and later, Nanami asks Haruto to be her date for the summer festival. Yuzuki's step-siblings also attend the summer festival, and Rin reveals to Nanami why Haruto canceled their date. As a result, Nanami decides to not go to the festival, but then realizes she loves Haruto and attends anyway. She nearly confesses her feelings to Haruto but is interrupted with the news that Yuzuki is missing.
| 5 | June 17, 2009 | 978-4-06-384151-0 |
39. "The Last Time" (最後だから, "Saigo Dakara"); 40. "The Night He Was Dumped" (フラれた夜。, "Furareta Yoru."); 41. "The Night Of Crying Brightens" (涙の夜が明け, "Namida no Yoru ga Ake"); 42. "Bitter And Sweet" (Bitter & Sweet); 43. "A Town Where Eels Live" (鰻のいる町, "Unagi no Iru Machi"); 44. "One's Path And Everything Else" (進路とか、いろいろ, "Shinro Toka, Iroiro"); 45. "The School Festival Is Coming" (文化祭がやってくる, "Bunka Matsuri ga Yattekuru"); 46. "About Eba-san" (枝葉さんのことが, "Eba-san no Koto ga"); 47. "Searching For An Apple Farm" (リンゴ農家を探せ, "Ringo Nōka o Sagase"); 48. "History's Largest Confirmation" (史上最大の確認, "Shijō Saidai no Kakunin")
Nanami, seeing Haruto and Yuzuki together, decides not to date Haruto. Haruto and Yuzuki are chosen to be part of a committee for a school event. For the event, Haruto works on his relationship with Nanami, and asks to use her family's apple farm. He then discusses their relationship and why she won't date him where she confirms it is due to his relationship with Yuzuki.
| 6 | September 17, 2009 | 978-4-06-384189-3 |
49. "Something That Couldn't Be Said" (言えなかったこと, "Ienakatta Koto"); 50. "For Who?" (誰がため, "Dare ga Tame"); 51. "The Road Home Has Been A While" (久し振りの帰り道, "Hisashiburi no Kaerimichi"); 52. "Kikukawa's Glasses" (菊川のメガネ, "Kikukawa no Megane"); 53. "Ignition" (着火, "Chakka"); 54. "Up In Flames" (炎上, "Enjō"); 55. "Invitations To The Kouyasai" (後夜祭の誘い, "Goya-sai no Sasoi"); 56. "Kōyasai" (後夜祭, "Goya-sai"); Esp. "Yuna One Shot" (七夕, "Tanabata")
Since Yuzuki reconciled with her family, she will be moving back to Tokyo after the school year. This causes Haruto to realize that he has feelings for Yuzuki and tries to show Yuzuki. She then avoids him after. Meanwhile, a girl from the school committee believes that Haruto will ask her to be his date for the Kōyasai. But, Haruto asks Yuzuki to be his date.
| 7 | November 17, 2009 | 978-4-06-384215-9 |
57. "Even If..." (仮に‥‥, "Karini‥‥"); 58. "A Pretty Flower" (キレイな花, "Kireina Hana"); 59. "With Haruto-Kun" (青人くんとの‥, "Ao Haruto-kun to no‥"); 60. "The Beginning Of Long Distance" (エンキョリ開始, "Enkyori Kaishi"); 61. "Meddlesome People" (お節介なヤツら, "Osekkaina Yatsura"); 62. "The Destination For The School Trip" (修学旅行の行方, "Shūgakuryokō no Yukue"); 63. "Shrimp Tails" (エビの尻尾, "Ebi no Shippo"); 64. "A Professional's Taste" (プロの味, "Puro no Aji"); 65. "Don't Rush The Love Story" (まかないと、恋話。, "Makanai to, Koihana."); Esp. "A Town Where Rin Live" (懍のいる町, "Rin no Iru Machi")
Haruto confesses his feelings to Yuzuki. Yuzuki says she will not date anyone since she is moving. On the day of Yuzuki's move, Haruto convinces her to try a long-distance relationship. Later, Haruto's class is going on a field trip to Tokyo, so Haruto begins working at a restaurant to earn money for a present for Yuzuki.
| 8 | February 17, 2010 | 978-4-06-384251-7 |
66. "School Trip" (修学旅行, "Shūgakuryokō"); 67. "Kanzaki's Boyfriend" (神咲の彼氏や, "Kanzaki no Kareshiya"); 68. "No Contact" (音信不通, "Inshinfutsū"); 69. "Meanie" (ずるいよ‥。, "Zurui yo‥."); 70. "The Pains of Goodbyes" (別れの辛さ, "Wakare no Karasa"); 71. "Nanami Again" (七海ふたたび, "Nanami Futatabi"); 72. "A Love Burn" (恋、焦がし, "Koi, Kogashi"); 73. "Rin's Tip Off" (懍のタレコミ, "Rin no Tarekomi"); 74. "After She Did It" (しちゃった後。, "Shi Chatta Nochi."); 75. "The Left Over Letter" (置き手紙, "Okitegami")
During the school trip, Nanami asks Haruto to pretend to be her boyfriend to impress her friend. The two are then seen by Yuzuki, but the misunderstanding is resolved. Yuzuki gives Haruto a present and the next day, Haruto's class returns home. Yuzuki has cut ties with everyone from Shōbara, including ending the relationship with Haruto. Haruto is saddened by this, and Nanami attempts to comfort him and confesses her feelings for him. Haruto learns that Yuzuki has begun dating someone. He finds a letter in Yuzuki's present which says so, but he believes something has happened to Yuzuki.
| 9 | April 16, 2010 | 978-4-06-384284-5 |
76. "Going After Her" (追っかけて, "Okkakete"); 77. "Clash" (衝突, "Shōtotsu"); 78. "Something Forgotten" (忘れ物, "Wasuremono"); 78.5. "A Special Recollection" (特別回想編 ウチがきた町, "Tokubetsu Kaisō-hen Uchi ga Kita Machi"); 79. "Before The Departure" (さよならの前に, "Sayonara no Mae ni"); 80. "Premonition of Love" (恋の予感, "Koi no Yokan"); 81. "Talking Weird" (変な言葉, "Hen'na Kotoba"); 82. "Meddling" (おせっかい, "Osekkai"); 83. "A Country Side Dining Table" (田舎モンの食卓, "Inaka Mon no Shokutaku"); 84. "An Unwavering Dream" (捨てられぬ夢, "Sute Rarenu Yume")
Haruto decides to move to Tokyo and talks with his friends, Akari and Takashi, about their past together. During their discussion, Akari kisses him and asks him not to forget them. In Tokyo, Haruto becomes friends with Asuka Mishima and Kyousuke Kazama.
| 10 | July 16, 2010 | 978-4-06-384331-6 |
85. "Just One Wish" (1枚の望み, "1-Mai no Nozomi"); 86. "He Came!" (出たー！, "Deta!"); 87. "Seen In A Dream" (夢にまで見た, "Yume ni Made Mita"); 88. "Things That Feel Good" (気持ちいいこと, "Kimochīi Koto"); 89. "Greetings" (あいさつ, "Aisatsu"); 90. "Maybe There Still Is..." (もしかしたら、まだ, "Moshika Shitara, Mada"); 91. "Just Like What He Did For Me" (私にしてくれたみたいに, "Watashi ni Shite Kureta Mitai ni"); 92. "Who I Am" (オレの本心, "Ore no Honshin"); 93. "Delicious Fried Eggs" (おいしい卵焼き, "Oishī Tamagoyaki"); 94. "Beef Stroganoff Trap" (ビーフストロガノフの罠, "Bīfu Sutoroganofu no Wana")
Haruto asks a classmate, Mina Nagoshi, to take him to an event at Yuzuki's school. There he finds Yuzuki but is asked to stay away from her; and shortly after, Haruto learns that Yuzuki is dating Kyousuke. Yuzuki says that after learning Kyousuke was terminally ill with a year left to live, she began to date him. Realizing he can't remain friends with Kyousuke unless he is honest, Haruto openly declares his intentions to date Yuzuki.
| 11 | October 15, 2010 | 978-4-06-384383-5 |
95. "Because You Think It" (想えばこそ, "Amoeba Koso"); 96. "Unsurfaced Anger" (怒りの源泉, "Ikari no Gensen"); 97. "The Canned Peach Plan" (桃缶作戦！, "Momokan Sakusen!"); 98. "No Handicaps" (ハンデなしで, "Hande Nashide"); 99. "I Can Trust Her To You" (お前に任せる, "Omae ni Makaseru"); 100. "Favor" (ねがい, "Negai"); 101. "At The Highest Place" (一番高い場所で, "Ichiban Takai Basho de"); 102. "What Was Burned" (焦がしたのは, "Kogashita no Wa"); 103. "The Snow In Hiroshima" (広島の雪, "Hiroshima no Yuki"); 104. "Absolutely Can't Win" (絶対に勝てない, "Zettai ni Katenai")
Kyousuke's friend, Kiyomi Asakura, shares that Kyousuke has declined to have a risky surgery because he wants to use his illness to date Yuzuki. However, hearing Haruto's feelings changes his mind, and he decides to have the surgery to compete for Yuzuki's love fairly. The day before the surgery, Kyousuke invites everyone for dinner, and Kiyomi reveals she loves him. The surgery fails and Kyousuke dies. Haruto and Yuzuki decide not to date each other as they feel guilty about starting a relationship after his death. Haruto invites Asuka and Kiyomi to Shōbara for winter break.
| 12 | January 17, 2011 | 978-4-06-384429-0 |
105. "Unfinished Business" (やり残したこと, "Yari Nokoshita Koto"); 106. "All There's Left To Do Is Go Forward" (あとは前に進むだけ, "Ato wa Mae ni Susumu Dake"); 107. "This Time For Sure" (今度は絶対, "Kondo wa Zettai"); 108. "You Do Things Like Kiss And Stuff, Right?" (キスとかするモンだろ, "Kisutoka Suru Mondaro"); 109. "Going Public" (報告, "Hōkoku"); 110. "Campus Life" (キャンパスライフ, "Kyanpasu Raifu"); 111. "Welcome Party" (新歓コンパ, "Shinkan Konpa"); 112. "You Can Thank Me With Your Body" (お礼はカラダで, "Orei wa Karada de"); 113. " Gathering Notes For An Author" (作者取材のため, "Sakusha Shuzai no Tame"); 114. "What Are You Thinking About Right Now?" (いま何考えてる？, "Ima Nani Kangae Teru?")
Haruto considers his feelings for Asuka. Asuka loves Haruto, but he has never shown feelings for her so she tells him she has to stop being friends. This causes Haruto to recognize his feelings and tells her. Before telling everyone about their relationship, Haruto and Asuka visit Kyousuke's grave to tell him first. Two years later, Haruto and his friends have entered the same Seijo University. Haruto is tricked into going to a love hotel by Shiori Amaya for reference materials and is seen by Nanami. Shiori Amaya uses this to blackmail Haruto into taking class notes for her while she focuses on her career as a manga artist.
| 13 | April 15, 2011 | 978-4-06-384476-4 |
115. "Interrogation At Cafe Amami" (尋問@カフェ天見, "Jinmon @ Kafe Amami"); 116. "A Strange Date" (変なデート, "Hen'na Dēto"); 117. "...Right?" (‥‥ね？, "‥‥ Ne?"); 118. "I Have A Girlfriend" (彼女おるし！, "Kanojo Orushi!"); 119. "The Night They See Each Other Again" (再会の夜に, "Saikai no Yoru ni"); 120. "More Than You Think" (思ってるよりも, "Omotteru Yori mo"); 121. "To Pass By Destiny" (Destinyで、すれ違い。, "Desutinī de, Surechigai."); 122. "The Bombshell Girl Returns" (爆弾娘ふたたび, "Bakudan Musume Futatabi"); 123. "Get Mad" (怒られて, "Okora Rete"); 124. "A Challenge" (挑戦状, "Chōsen-jō")
Haruto continues to be blackmailed into keeping Shiori's career a secret. Haruto has a difficult time explaining the situation to his friends and Asuka. But, luckily, Asuka believes his good intentions. Haruto goes to a group date where he is reunited with Yuzuki. Yuzuki treats Haruto cordially and exchanges contact information with him. Haruto begins working part-time at a convenience store and becomes reacquainted with Rin. Rin challenges Haruto's feelings for Asuka, and invites him on a date to an amusement park.
| 14 | July 15, 2011 | 978-4-06-384520-4 |
125. "You Going On A Date?" (デートするか。, "Dēto Suru ka."); 126. "The Best Smile" (最高の笑顔, "Saikō no Egao"); 127. "Two Phone Straps" (ふたつのストラップ, "Futatsu no Sutorappu"); 128. "The Notebook" (ノートのゆくえ, "Nōto no Yukue"); 129. "Summer Plans" (夏休みの予定, "Natsuyasumi no Yotei"); 130. "Moving Forward" (前に進め, "Mae ni Susume"); 131. "One Step At A Time" (一歩ずつ, "Ippo Zutsu"); 132. "About Yuzuki" (柚希のこと, "Yūzuki no Koto"); 133. "Better than my Ex" (元カレよりも。, "Moto Kare Yori mo."); 134. "Continuing Our Conversation" (話の続き, "Hanashi no Tsudzuki")
Instead of the date with Rin, it turns out that Rin has set up a date between Haruto and Yuzuki. While at the amusement park, Haruto invites Yuzuki to go with him as he finds a souvenir for Asuka. Haruto and Asuka plan a trip to Okinawa for the summer, but Asuka is forced to cancel due to a family member being injured. Remembering it's Yuzuki's birthday, Haruto gives her a pendant from two years ago. Yuzuki takes this to mean she should move on from Kyousuke's death and discards her old pendant from him. Haruto, his friends, and Yuzuki decide to return to Shōbara for the summer.
| 15 | October 17, 2011 | 978-4-06-384567-9 |
135. "The Two Left Behind" (残された2人, "Nokosa Reta 2-Ri"); 136. "The Fourth Time" (4度目は, "4-Dome wa"); 137. "The Town Where I Met You" (大好きです, "Daisuki Desu"); 138. "You Liar" (ウソつき, "Usotsuki"); 139. "Choices" (選択肢, "Sentakushi"); 140. "Confession" (「告白」, "`Kokuhaku'"); 141. "Everyone's Decisions" (それぞれの決意, "Sorezore no Ketsui"); 142. "Advice" (助言, "Jogen"); 143. "As Your Girlfriend" (彼女として, "Kanojo to Shite"); 144. "The First Step" (はじめの一歩, "Hajime no Ippo")
At the summer festival, Haruto and Yuzuki confess their love for each other. Haruto decides to end his relationship with Asuka to be with Yuzuki, but their decision causes their friends to ostracize them. Haruto decides to move to a new apartment and makes amends with Asuka.
| 16 | December 12, 2011 | 978-4-06-384601-0 |
145. "Purikura" (プリクラ, "Purikura"); 146. "The Day Of The Departure" (門出の日, "Kadode no Hi"); 147. "A Love Song" (恋の歌, "Koi no Uta"); 148. "His Neighbor!?" (お隣さんは!?, "Otonari-san wa!?"); 149. "Swimsuit Surprise" (水着サプライズ, "Mizugi Sapuraizu"); 150. "A Pool Date" (プール・デート, "Pūru Dēto"); 151. "To The Pool Again!?" (プール再び!?, "Pūru Futatabi!?"); 152. "Leading To A Misunderstanding" (誤解の行方, "Gokai no Yukue"); 153. "Relocation!?" (転勤!?, "Tenkin!?"); 154. "Mover" (引っ越しお手伝い, "Hikkoshi Otetsudai")
Haruto and Yuzuki become acquainted with Miyu Hoshina, Haruto's neighbor and junior from school. Haruto then adjusts to his daily life with Yuzuki, and becomes friends with Miyu and Rin. Yuzuki and Rin's family moves to Nagoya leaving the two alone in Tokyo.
| 17 | March 16, 2012 | 978-4-06-384644-7 |
155. "Late Night Film Festival" (深夜の鑑賞会, "Shin'ya no Kanshō-kai"); 156. "A Visitor !?" (来訪者は!?, "Raihō-sha wa!?"); 157. "What Are Her Father's True Intentions ?" (父の真意!?, "Chichi no Shin'i!?"); 158. "In Nagoya" (名古屋にて。, "Nagoya Nite."); 159. "Formal Dining, Declaring War" (宣戦布告な晩餐会, "Sensen Fukokuna Bansan-kai"); 160. "Decision" (決断, "Ketsudan"); 161. "Their First Night" (初めての夜, "Hajimete no Yoru"); 162. ""Living Together"" (「同棲」, "`Dōsei'"); 163. "A Father's Past" (父の過去, "Chichi no Kako"); 164. "Letter" (手紙, "Tegami")
Yuzuki's father learns about her relationship with Haruto, and forcefully brings her to Nagoya. Haruto attempts to convince him to let Yuzuki return to Tokyo, but her father does not agree. She then runs away from home and moves in with Haruto. Yuzuki's stepmother visits and lets them know that Yuzuki's father has reluctantly approved of their relationship.
| 18 | June 15, 2012 | 978-4-06-384689-8 |
165. "A Surprising Present" (びっくりプレゼント, "Bikkuri Purezento"); 166. "An Unexpected Reunion" (思わぬ再会。, "Omowanu Saikai."); 167. "A Gathering" (勢揃い！, "Seizoroi!"); 168. "The Panty Incident!?" (パンツ事件!?, "Pantsu Jiken!?"); 169. "Going to Visit a Grave" (墓参りへ, "Hakamairi e"); 170. "To Kazama" (風間へ, "Kazama e"); 171. "Trick or Treat" (トリック・オア・トリート, "Torikku oa Torīto"); 172. "The Day Before They Leave" (出発前日, "Shuppatsu Zenjitsu"); 173. "Nanami's Secret" (七海の激白, Nanami no Gekihaku"); 174. "Ice Flowers" (氷花, "Hibana")
Akari contacts Haruto to reconcile their friendship, along with Takashi. Haruto, Yuzuki, Akari, and Takashi get together to mend their relationships. On the anniversary of Kyousuke's death, the group finds Kiyomi and Asuka, and are able to resolve their differences. Lastly, Haruto reconciles with Nanami.
| 19 | August 17, 2012 | 978-4-06-384720-8 |
175. "It's Really Sweet!" (すっごく甘いモノ・, "Suggoku Amai Mono"); 176. "Premature Ejaculation?" (ソーロー!?, "Sōrō!?"); 177. "A Little Love Rival" (小さな恋敵!?, "Chīsana Koigataki!?"); 178. "An Authorized Affair !?" (公認浮気!?, "Kōnin Uwaki!?"); 179. "Homesick" (望郷, "Bōkyō"); 180. "Circles" (サークル, "Sākuru"); 181. "Camping" (キャンプ, "Kyanpu"); 182. "Grand Failure" (大失敗, "Dai Shippai"); 183. "Let's Go One step At a Time" (一歩ずつ進もう, "Ippo Zutsu Susumou"); 184. "Newcomer Party" (初幹事, "Hatsu Kanji")
Yuzuki's student, Chisa Miyanaga, confesses her love towards Haruto. Chisa threatens to go on a study strike if she doesn't have a date with Haruto- which he agrees to. At school, Haruto decides to join an outdoors camping club; where he meets club captain Seiya Mizumoto and is reacquainted with his high school classmate Mina Nagoshi. During the camping trip, Mina misunderstands Haruto's words and actions, and believes she is now his girlfriend.
| 20 | November 16, 2012 | 978-4-06-384767-3 |
185. "Picnic under the Cherry Blossoms" (お花見, "O Hanami"); 186. "Homesick" (帰るけェ, "Kaeru ke"); 187. "Goodbye" (サヨナラ, "Sayonara"); 188. "Okay, let's go!" (さあ、いこう！, "Sāikou!"); 189. "Depends on what you do" (行動あるのみ！, "Kōdō Aru Nomi!"); 190. "No change at all?" (相変わらずで？, "Aikawarazu de?"); 191. "I'm not alone!" (1人じゃない！, "1-Ri Janai!"); 192. "What the Hell!" (何なのよ！, "Nanina no Yo!"); 193. "Don't touch me!" (触んないで！, "Sawan'naide!"); 194. "Only here!" (ここだけだよ！, "Koko Dakeda Yo!")
Akari's father becomes sick forcing her to drop out of school and join her father's company. Miyu asks Haruto and Yuzuki to go on a trip with her to Okinawa to overcome her social anxiety. To pay for the trip, Haruto takes another part-time job at Shiho's restaurant. After hearing Haruto talk about a girl at work, Yuzuki begins to treat him coldly. The two then reconcile on the Okinawa trip.
| 21 | January 17, 2013 | 978-4-06-384797-0 |
195. "Goya Night?" (ゴーヤナイト☆, "Gōya Naito ☆"); 196. "I'll Go Home" (私、帰ります。, "Watashi, Kaerimasu."); 197. "Try Again Tomorrow" (また、明日, "Mata, Ashita"); 198. "A Man's Problems" (男なりの事情, "Otoko Nari no Jijō"); 199. "Revenge" (リベンジ, "Ribenji"); 200. "Your Precious Other Half" (好きの向こう側, "Suki no Mukōgawa"); 201. "Restart" (リスタート, "Risutāto"); 202. "A Place To Belong" (居場所, "Ibasho"); 203. "Card Game" (一生ゲーム, "Isshō Gēmu")
Haruto gives Yuzuki a ring which she puts on her ring finger. The two attend a summer festival, and after returning home, have sex for the first time. Rin hears about it and realizes that she liked Haruto this whole time. At his high school reunion, Haruto gets drunk and is carried back to Asuka's room.
| 22 | March 15, 2013 | 978-4-06-384837-3 |
204. "Reunion" (再会・, "Saikai"); 205. "Sparks Flying" (バチバチ, "Bachi Bachi"); 206. "Answer To A Confession" (告白の返事, "Kokuhaku no Henji"); 207. "Character Assessment" (本性発覚！, "Honshō Hakkaku!"); 208. "The Destination Of An Unrequited Love" (片想いの行方, "Kataomoi no Yukue"); 209. "Earnest, Huh?" (一途か!?, "Ichizu ka!?"); 210. "Dreamer?" (夢追い人？, "Yumeoibito?"); 211. "The Greatest Moment" (最高の一瞬, "Saikō no Isshun"); 212. "Have a Good Year" (今年もよろしく♪, "Kotoshi mo Yoroshiku ♪"); 213. "Leading for The First Time?" (初リーダー!?, "Hatsu Rīdā!?")
Asuka calls a taxi and accompanies Haruto home. There, Yuzuki apologies for taking Haruto from Asuka and the two reconcile. Nanami asks Haruto if she should date Akito Fujikawa. Upon hearing rumors that Akito is a womanizer, Haruto investigates. The rumors turn out to be false as the girl who started the rumor is revealed to have a crush on Nanami. The same girl then attempts to pursue Yuzuki and then Rin. For New Years, Haruto and their friends vacation to Mount Fuji. Haruto and Mina are appointed as the captains for the outdoors camping club. Later, Haruto gets his driver's license.
| 23 | June 17, 2013 | 978-4-06-384878-6 |
214. "Reunion" (お兄さん!!, "Onīsan!!"); 215. "Good Driver!?" (運転上手!?, "Unten Jōzu!?"); 216. "Leadership" (リーダーシップ, "Rīdāshippu"); 217. "Mixed Bathing!?" (混浴!?, "Kon'yoku!?"); 218. "Renewing Memories" (思い出の更新, "Omoide no Kōshin"); 219. "Akari's True Motive" (月の真意, "Akari no Shin'i"); 220. "Not Cool!!" (おもんない！, "Omon'nai!"); 221. "As If I'd Cry!" (泣くもんか！, "Naku Mon Ka!"); 222. "Time To Make Up Your Mind" (決意の刻, "Ketsui no Koku")
Yuzuki convinces Haruto to return to the location where they promised to stop seeing each other after Kyousuke's death in order to rewrite the memories associated with that location. Akari reveals she is going to marry Narumi. But, she asks Haruto to have sex with her to make sure she no longer has feelings for him. Haruto declines. After Akari's wedding ceremony, Miyu makes plans to study abroad and Takashi confides to Haruto that Kiyomi is pregnant.
| 24 | August 16, 2013 | 978-4-06-394912-4 |
223. "The Riff Raff" (THE ドタバタ, "THE Dotabata"); 224. "I Plan To..." (大前提は‥!?, "Daizentei wa‥!?"); 225. "Rehearsal!" (予行練習！, "Yokō Renshū!"); 226. "Overtime!?" (延長戦!?, "Enchō-sen!?"); 227. "Cats Aren't That Bad" (猫は悪くない！, "Neko wa Warukunai!"); 228. "Crabs" (ヤドカリ, "Yadokari"); 229. "You're Not Alone" (サヨーナラ!?, "Sayōnara!?"); 230. "Declaration Of War!!" (ライバル再び, "Raibaru Futatabi"); 231. "Farts" (ブーブー, "Būbū"); 232. "Something I'm Passionate About" (夢中になれるコト, "Muchū ni Nareru Koto")
Takashi and Kiyomi decide to keep their baby and receive permission from Kiyomi's parents. Haruto and Yuzuki host a party for Miyu before her departure. Chisa moves into Miyu's apartment.
| 25 | November 15, 2013 | 978-4-06-394965-0 |
233. "The Secret Behind The Moan" (声のヒミツ, "Koe no Himitsu"); 234. "In A Rut!?" (マンネリ!?, "Man'neri!?"); 235. "The Tokyo Decision" (東京決意, "Tōkyō Ketsui"); 236. "The Reason Behind The Fight" (ケンカの理由, "Kenka no Riyū"); 237. "Job Fair" (合同会社説明会, "Gōdō Kaisha Setsumei Kai"); 238. "Anything, Anywhere!" (何が何でも！, "Naniganandemo!"); 239. "Liar Liar" (ウソばっかり, "Uso Bakkari"); 240. "Switch" (スイッチ, "Suitchi"); 241. "The Burden Of Expectations" (期待の重み, "Kitai no Omomi"); 242. "Smile!" (笑顔！, "Egao!")
Haruto begins searching for a job and befriends his old classmate Mina Nagato. Kiyomi gives birth to her child. Haruto and Yuzuki discuss starting a family, and Yuzuki decides on the name Daiki if they have a son. Mina tells Haruto that she intends to use her body to secure an interview. Haruto convinces her not to, and Mina succeeds in finding a job without it. An employer, having seen Haruto save Mina, offers him a job.
| 26 | January 17, 2014 | 978-4-06-394995-7 |
243. "First Appearance!" (初登場！, "Hatsu Tōjō!"); 244. "Forward!" (前進！, "Zenshin!"); 245. "Forever And Ever" (ずっとずっと, "Zuttozutto"); 246. "A Rift Between Them" (2人の距離, "2-Ri no Kyori"); 247. "Three And a Half Years' Worth" (3年半の, "3-Nen Han no"); 248. "Quality Merchandise" (良い商品, "Yoi Shōhin"); 249. "Example?" (目標？, "Mokuhyō?"); 250. "Why You Like Her" (好きの理由, "Suki no Riyū"); 251. "Why I Like Her" (好きの理由!!, "Suki no Riyū!!"); 252. "Long Distance Relationships" (遠距離恋愛, "Enkyori Ren'ai")
Haruto starts his new job. Yuzuki keeps visiting Haruto at his work. And, Haruto realises that she has spent a lot of money to keep visiting him. He feels bad about it, but he likes having Yuzuki visiting him.
| 27 | March 17, 2014 | 978-4-06-395029-8 |
253. "Secret!" (秘訣！, "Hiketsu!"); 254. "The Time for Decisions" (決断時期, "Ketsudan Jiki"); 255. "What Should I Do!?" (どうする!?, "Dō Suru!?"); 256. "Answer" (答え, "Kotae"); 257. "Work" (仕事, "Shigoto"); 258. "Fight" (のこった!!, "Nokotta!!"); 259. "Growing Up?" (一人前？, "Ichininmae?"); 260. "Cherry Blossom Petals" (花びら 桜, "Hanabira Sakura"); 261. "When The Cherry Blossoms Blooms" (桜の咲く頃, "Sakura no Sakukoro")
Haruto decides to break up with Yuzuki due to the costs of a long distance relationship. Yuzuki seems to take it well, but as the train leaves the station, Haruto sees Yuzuki crying. He feels bad, but feels like it was the right decision to let her fulfill her dreams and for him to continue working where he is. Years later, Haruto receives a promotion at work which is located back in Tokyo. Haruto is excited to work in Tokyo and have the potential of seeing Yuzuki. Haruto meets up with Takashi and asks about Yuzuki. Takashi is impressed that Haruto has not given up on Yuzuki and has had no girlfriend. Haruto then walks to the cherry blossom trees where he and Yuzuki had promised to meet each other each year. As the flowers drop, he sees Yuzuki standing there. She tells him that he is late which makes Haruto cry as he hugs her. Yuzuki and Haruto get married. Their friends comment on how impressed they all are that the two waited for each other and searched each other out after all this time. Another few years later, Takashi and Akari visit Haruto's restaurant. Haruto has quit his job to open his own restaurant. As they are going in, they see Daiki, Haruto and Yuzuki's son. At the restaurant, all of their old friends gather to watch Asuka play softball on Japan's national team along with Kazama's helmet. Haruto contemplates how happy he is to be with Yuzuki and his friends again in this town where he lives.
