= IJET =

IJET may mean:

- International Journal of Educational Technology, a peer-reviewed journal about Educational Technology
- International Japanese-English Translation Conference, annual conference organized by the Japan Association of Translators
- A brand of Independence Air
