= Konpa =

Japanese drinking gathering

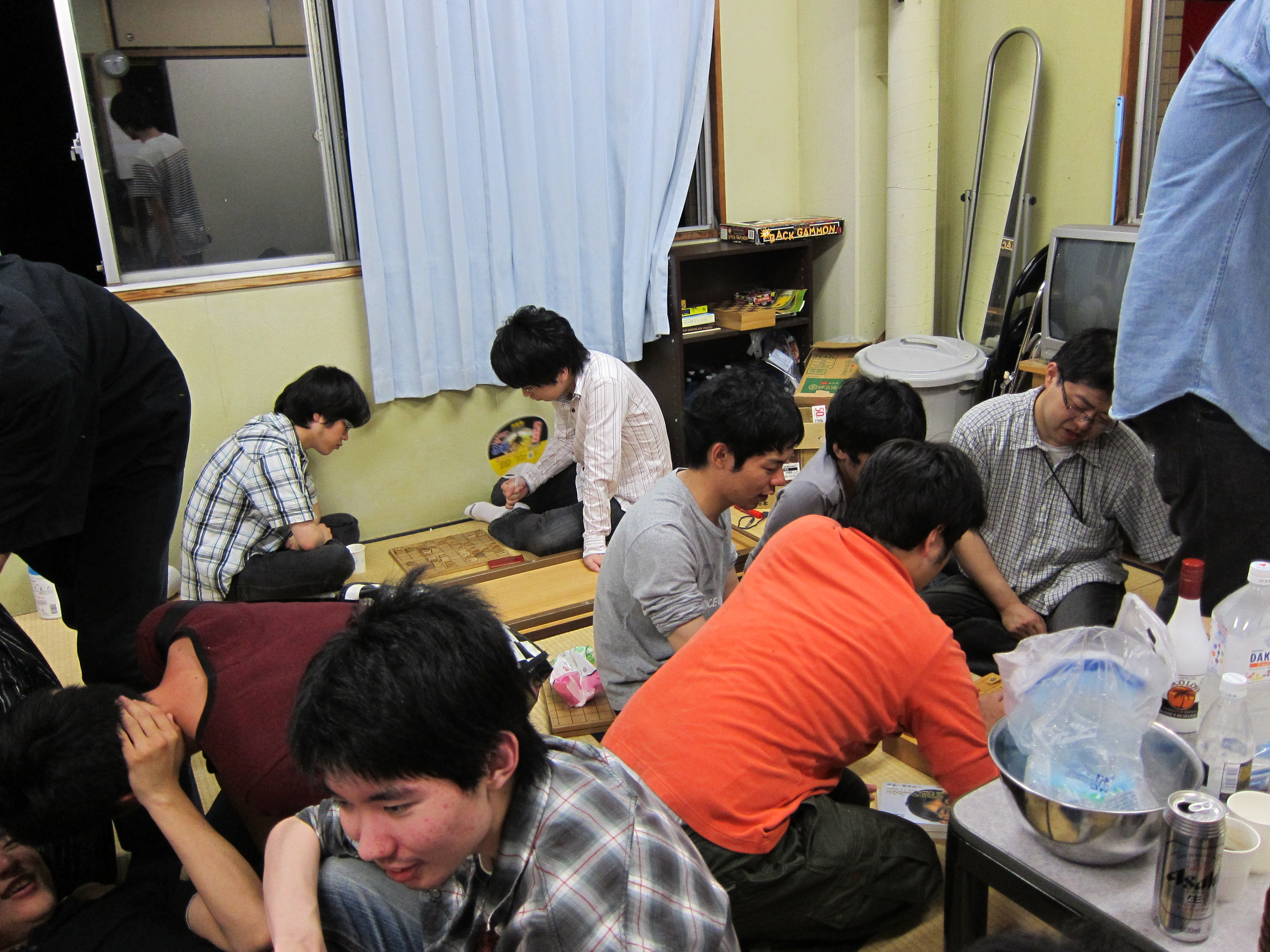
A group of students playing different games at a konpa

Konpa (コンパ) are a type of Japanese drinking gathering held by university students in a casual drinking establishment called an izakaya, and are more relaxed than the traditional nomikai. It is often suggested that this word originally came from German: Kompanie, English: company, or French: compagnie, although the exact root is unknown. These gatherings are intended for developing friendships or deepening relationships with members of the same affiliated group or with the opposite sex that benefit Japanese socially in their careers and in their lives.

== History ==
When Japanese university culture was first established during the Meiji period (1868–1912), the custom of members of the same class or dormitory drinking together to deepen their bond of friendship began. These gatherings were largely restricted to members of the same sex until after World War II when mixing between the sexes became increasingly more common. The modern manifestation of this drinking custom is the konpa of today. In recent years, young professionals continue to hold konpa even after graduation from a university, often to find a potential spouse, but the definition of konpa (as opposed to the all encompassing nomikai) restricts it to young people and is very rarely participated in after marriage.

== Current practice ==
Konpa are heavily planned, and an appointed organizer (termed kanji in Japanese) often seeks out the location, determines a time, and sets the price for each attendee. The participants in the parties are pre-determined, and it is not typically accepted to attend or join in a konpa if one is not invited by the kanji. Attendees typically sit on the floor on a sitting cushion (see: zabuton) around a long table in a secluded area of the predetermined venue. In some cases attendees will be seated at one or several Western-style tables. As typical of Japanese drinking gatherings (see: nomikai), konpa often begin with an opening speech from a senior member or organizer and a toast. Drinks are brought in by a wait staff along with various types of snacks thought to go along with alcohol (termed tsumami in Japanese). It is typical to have a time-restricted "all you can drink" period termed nomihōdai (or nomihō for short) that is paid for by a set fee. This often comes along with a certain number of snacks, and extra items can generally be ordered for an additional price. A beer-only "all you can drink" period is usually cheaper than an all-inclusive period including heavier liquors. This system is conducive to the heavy drinking prevalent among Japanese university students, which is viewed as a way of relaxing to permit more uninhibited conversation between attendees. It is common for attendees to drink to the point of vomiting or losing consciousness. It is usually the duty of the organizer to ensure that everyone has all of his or her own belongings and that they return home safely.

== Variations ==
=== Freshman welcoming konpa ===
Japanese: shinnyūsei kangei konpa (新入生歓迎コンパ) or abbreviated shinkan konpa (新歓コンパ)

As new freshmen enter the university setting, student organizations, clubs, sports teams, and/or dormitories often recruit them heavily. Many of these groups schedule welcoming konpa for any interested freshmen, and offer free drinks. It is an opportunity for incoming freshmen to meet members of various organizations in a socially risk-free environment that provides the aforementioned free drinks for the first few rounds of the shinkan konpa. The cost of the freshmen’s drinks is typically spread evenly among group members, or is paid for through either organization funding or alumni. As many incoming freshmen have little experience drinking alcohol, for many Japanese the shinkan konpa is the induction into Japanese drinking culture and their first nomikai. It is common for the upperclassmen to test the tolerance limits of the attending freshmen by encouraging heavy drinking or chugging. As there are several rounds of these shinkan konpa, there is a perceived escalation of commitment if a freshman continues to participate. It is common in the last round for a freshman to make a commitment speech to the group.

=== Seminar konpa ===
Japanese: zemi konpa (ゼミコンパ)

The Japanese seminar course or zemi is a small focus group of students who, with a supervising professor, study a similar topic together in a course setting for two years and write a graduation thesis upon completion of the course. These students, with their professors, often go out to drink after a long evening of studying. It is common for a professor to pay for the entire amount or a large bulk of the bill. Some zemis will include alumni of the seminar course to offer job-hunting advice to students. A "thesis completion konpa" (sotsugyō ronbun uchiage konpa, abbrev: sotsuron uchiage konpa) is also usually held after students have finished presenting their thesis.

=== Send-off konpa ===
Japanese: oidashi konpa (追い出しコンパ) or abbreviated oikon (追いコン)

Before seniors graduate, the groups they are affiliated with on campus (usually the zemis or various clubs) often have a send-off konpa for them. In this case the seniors are usually not required to pay any of the bill.

=== Joint konpa ===
Japanese: gōdō konpa (合同コンパ) or abbreviated gōkon (合コン)

Gōkon is a party where those looking for a relationship with the opposite sex participate, and is similar to the Western practice of blind dating. The usual spread is 4 females and 4 males, or 3 males and 3 females, though occasionally there will be a large gōkon organized with as many as 20 of each sex. There is usually one male who organizes a group of his friends, and one female who brings her friends. It is common for students to have gōkon with students from other universities.

See: Gōkon, Group dating

=== Sex konpa ===
Japanese: yarikon (ヤリコン)

There are some cases where both parties come into a konpa expecting to engage in sexual acts at the completion of the konpa either at a home, at a dormitory, or at a love hotel. In the case that the participants are looking specifically for a sexual encounter instead of a serious relationship, the konpa is called a yarikon. This word is derived from the Japanese slang yaru, to have sex, and the kon from "konpa."

== Drinking games ==
To keep the konpa lively or to increase the collective use of alcohol, it is common for participants to participate in drinking games. Although most of these games are simple, they become more difficult as participants become more intoxicated. Some of the most common games include:

=== Yamanote Line game ===
Japanese: Yamanote-sen gēmu (山手線ゲーム)

This game started with participants required to go around in a circle naming stations on the Yamanote line. Even if a different category is picked, it is still called the Yamanote-sen Game. Each participant must answer in rhythm with clapping, and must drink if they are unable to give an answer or give an answer not in the category.

=== No Laughing game ===
Japanese: waraccha ikenai gēmu (笑っちゃいけないゲーム)

The no-laughing game is very similar to Yamanote-sen game, but participants are allowed to repeat the same answer as another participant. The object of this game is to make someone in the group laugh. If anyone laughs, they are required to drink.

=== Pin-Pon-Pan ===
Japanese: pin pon pan (ピンポンパン)

Going around clockwise, the first participant says "pin", the second "pon", and the third "pan" while pointing to anyone else in the group. The person pointed to must then say "pin" and start over. If anyone makes a mistake they must drink.

=== Pocky game ===
Japanese: Pokkī gēmu (ポッキーゲーム)

This is a two-person game, but many can participate at one time. All that is required is one box of Pocky, a long biscuit with chocolate on one end. Two people begin eating one Pocky from each end. The first person whose mouth comes off the Pocky or the other player gets to the middle first loses. If the participants end up kissing, it is a tie. This game is particularly popular at gōkon.

=== King game ===
Japanese: ōsama gēmu (王様ゲーム)

The king game starts with a stack of paper equal to the number of participants, one of which is labeled as the "king," and others with a number. Each participant must then draw a piece. Similar to the American game of truth or dare, the king gets to give out an order, then calls out a number, without being aware of which person has which number. The participant with the called number must then follow the given order. After the order is carried out the pieces of paper are drawn again and a new king is appointed.

The king game is sometimes played without the number system.

== Gender and konpa ==
The roles that female and male students assume at a konpa are distinct from one another.

=== Female role ===
Female participants in konpa behave in ways seen as feminine by modern Japanese university students, such as acting as caregivers and emphasizing manners.

Women at konpa typically monitor the group members' drink levels to ensure everyone has a full drink at all times. They also make certain to clear the table when the party has ended and check to see if any personal belongings have been left.

Female students do not drink as much as male students, and usually consume cocktails, or drinks considered to be "pretty" and "girly." Females generally behave in a more passive manner than the men and may feel pressured to drink more than they would in a one-on-one situation because they cannot turn down a drink that has been offered to them.

=== Male role ===
Likewise, male participants in konpa have a clear tendency to assume roles seen as masculine to Japanese university students, such as showing their bravery and physical strength. One way this is achieved is by consuming large quantities of alcohol. Therefore, men drink more on average than the female participants.

Male students in konpa face, and largely yield to, peer pressure to drink. At the konpa, males participate in drinking games run by the upperclassmen senpai, and as a result, the students feel added pressure to drink.

Male students tend to take on the task of planning, deciding where to hold the konpa, and making the decisions during the parties. At konpa, the men take steps to behave as entertainers to the females. Men act more aggressive socially so as to provide amusement at the konpa by telling stories.

== Seniority power ==
During these konpa, the members involved have certain roles that demonstrate a hierarchy and a distribution of power among the participants. For instance, a kohai is a junior: anyone who is younger than or less progressed in something, while everyone that is higher level is a senpai. With these roles in mind, each individual acts accordingly. In this case, the kohai accepts all drinking gestures bestowed by the senpai, and the senpai has the authority to offer as many drinks as they like to the kohai.

Drinking parties start with a brief speech by someone appointed master of ceremonies, and perhaps a speech by the senior participant, or the kanji. Once the speeches are over, there is always a toast. In modern Japan, even when sake is available, the toast is usually drunk in beer, perhaps because beer is a better thirst-quencher than sake.

Each dish is considered communal, and every attendee has their own small plate, or torizara to put food onto. It is considered important to make sure that each dish has been passed around the table. It is improper for any participant to fill her or his own beer glass: this act is the responsibility of one’s neighbors, which can lead to everyone drinking more than they would otherwise. As the party warms up, people start moving about from one person to another, so that there is a constant circulation of people in the room, driven by junior members trying to ensure that they have an opportunity to talk to, and drink with, every senior person present. Power is distributed in a pyramid-like fashion from the eldest to the youngest.

== See also ==
- Nomikai
- Gōkon
