= Wales Interpretation and Translation Service =

Welsh quango

The Wales Interpretation and Translation Service (WITS; Welsh: Gwasanaeth Cyfieithu a Dehongli Cymru; GCDC) is a not-for-profit quango providing 24-hour linguistic services to public authorities in Wales, including councils, police forces, health and social services, but not courts.

The services offered include interpreting, translation and transcription, and cover approximately 135 languages & dialects including British Sign Language. The linguists are security vetted to national police employment standards and assessed and trained in professional interpreting.

It had a place on the steering committee of Professional Interpreters for Justice (PI4J), an umbrella group formed in 2011 to campaign against the Ministry of Justice language services framework agreement.

== History ==
WITS was created in November 2009 by Chief Inspector Tony Wilcox and formally established on 13 October 2010, with initial funding from the National Assembly for Wales, City of Cardiff Council and Gwent Police. The aims were to help people experiencing communication difficulties to overcome language barriers when accessing public services, and thereby to encourage social inclusion and integration, and improve community cohesion.

In January 2017 it was agreed to transfer hosting responsibilities from Gwent Police to Cardiff Council.

== See also ==
- Welsh Language Board
- Association of Welsh Translators and Interpreters
- List of UK interpreting and translation associations
