= Jnet =

Jnet or JNET may refer to:

- Japanese Network of the Institute of Translation & Interpreting in the United Kingdom
- Jewish Learning Network, an adult education program run by the Chabad-Lubavitch movement
- JNET Radio Network, An Australian Radio Network
- Jackpot Enterprises, which later changed its name to J Net Enterprises during the dot-com bubble in the 2000s
