= Association of Translation Companies =

- Type: Professional association
- Founded: 1976; 50 years ago
- Services: Representing Translation Companies
- Website: atc.org.uk

The Association of Translation Companies (ATC) is a professional membership association promoting language services in the United Kingdom and beyond. It represents the interests of translation companies operating in the UK's language services industry, which is home to over 1,200 translation companies, is worth more than £1 billion and employs more than 12,000 people.

The ATC has several membership levels, covering established companies, start-ups, corporate partners and technology partners. Full members can use an official certification stamp.

It is governed by a volunteer council, elected from its member companies, and is led by a chief executive officer.

== History ==
The Association of Translation Companies was formed in 1976 by leading British translation companies to promote the use of professionally produced translation work, and to support UK exporters.

It has played a role in the development of European language services, including the establishment of the European Union of Associations of Translation Companies. It was one of the original developers of the European translation services standard EN 15038, a precursor to the international translation services standard ISO 17100.

== Activities ==
The ATC organises regular networking and training events and webinars, and hosts an annual conference, the Language Industry Summit. It publishes an annual Language Industry Survey, in collaboration with market research firm Nimdzi Insights, charting the state of the language services industry in the UK. It also undertakes research and lobbying, including on the economic case for promoting languages.

The ATC's commercial ISO Certification Service provides auditing and certification services and training on language service and quality management ISO standards.

== See also ==
- List of UK interpreting and translation associations
- List of professional associations in the United Kingdom
