= Institute of Translation and Interpreting =

UK professional association

Institute of Translation and Interpreting (ITI)
- Formation: 1986
- Purpose: Promoting the highest standards in translation and interpreting
- Professional title: AITI, MITI and FITI
- Headquarters: Milton Keynes, UK
- Members: Circa 2,500
- Chair: Dr Jonathan Downie (Oct 2026- )
- Previous Chairs: Lloyd Bingham (Sep 2026), Fiona Gray (2025–2026), Nicki Bone (2022–2025), Paul Appleyard (2019–2022), Sarah Bawa-Mason (2016–2019), Iwan Davies (2013–2016), Nick Rosenthal (2011–2013), Pamela Mayorcas (2010–2011), Catherine Greensmith (2005–2010), preceded by Bill Chilcott, Graham Cross, Anne Napthine, Stephen Slade, Roger Fletcher, John Sykes)
- Chief Executive: Sara Robertson (May 2023– )
- Previous Chief Executive: Paul Wilson (2011–2023)
- Website: iti.org.uk

The Institute of Translation and Interpreting (ITI) is a professional association representing translators, interpreters and language services businesses in the United Kingdom. ITI is affiliated with the International Federation of Translators (FIT).

== History ==
ITI was founded in 1986, as a successor to the IOL's Translators' Guild. As the principal professional association of translators and interpreters in the United Kingdom, it has become one of the primary sources of information on translation and interpreting to government, industry, the media and the public. It was one of the bodies consulted regarding the creation of the EN 15038 European quality standard for the provision of translation services.

== Aim ==
The Institute of Translation and Interpreting aims to promote the highest standards in the translation and interpreting professions. It achieves this through the publication of a quarterly magazine (now known as ITI Insight), blog posts and pamphlets, the organisation of regular conferences and courses linked to continuing professional development, rigorous criteria for full membership including examinations and peer assessment, and a mentoring scheme for newcomers to the profession. The institute also worked together with the CIoL on the establishment and administration of the new designation of Chartered Linguist as well as collaborating with numerous other UK-based interpreting organizations in the umbrella body Professional Interpreters for Justice (PI4J/PIJ), to campaign against the new Ministry of Justice framework agreement for public service interpreting.

Dr Jonathan Downie, who became ITI's chair in October 2026

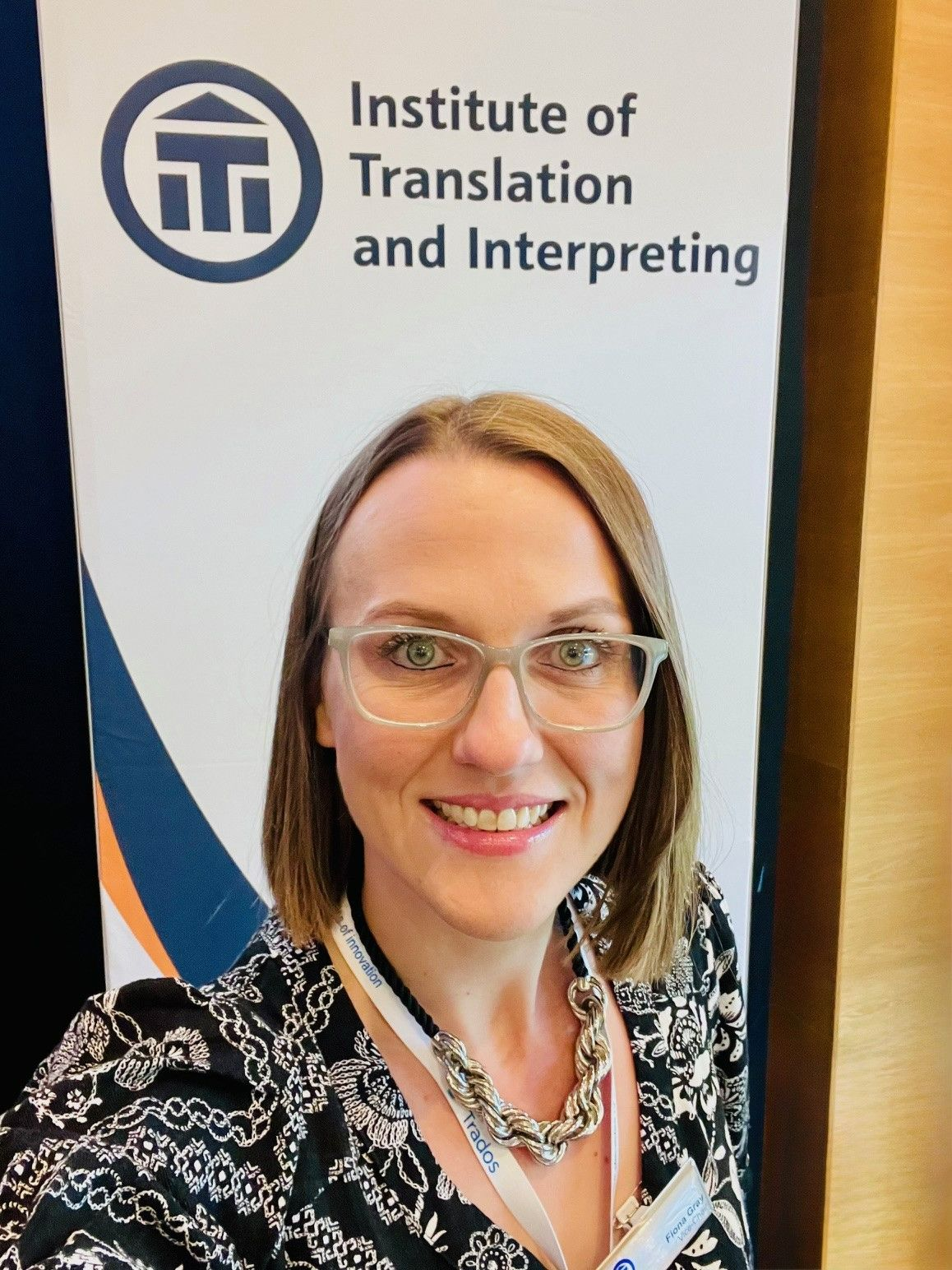
Fiona Gray, ITI's Chair from May 2025 until her resignation in September 2026

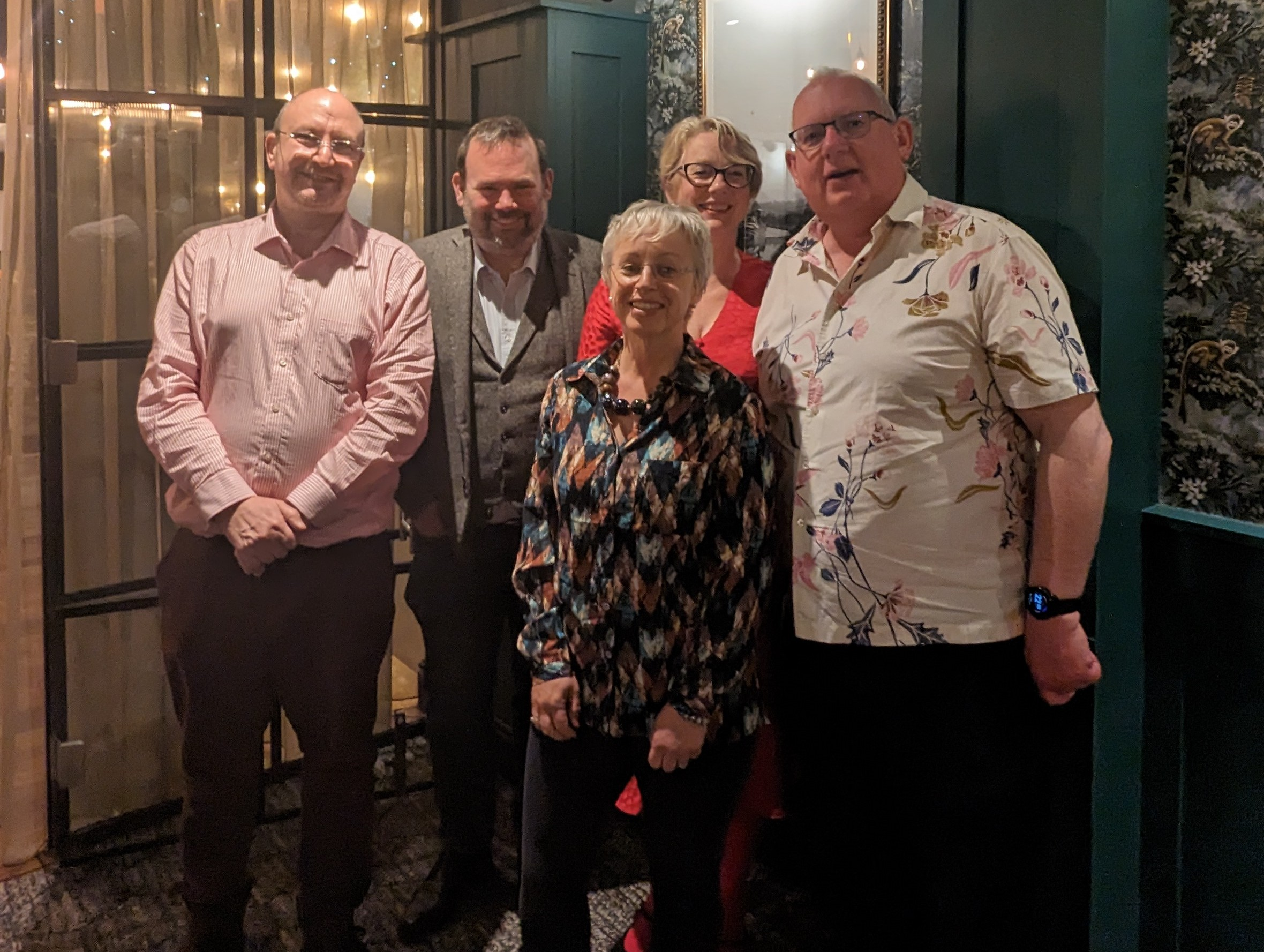
Five of ITI's previous chairs, from left Nick Rosenthal FITI, Iwan Davies FITI, Nicki Bone MITI, Sarah Bawa-Mason FITI, Paul Appleyard FITI

== Membership ==
Although most of its members are based in the United Kingdom, ITI has members from across continental Europe and other countries where English is commonly used. The main grades of individual membership are Fellow, Qualified Member, Associate, Affiliate, Project Manager and Student, and there are categories for individual Supporters and Academics, with some Corporate Members, classified into Corporate – Language Services Providers, Corporate Education and Corporate Affiliate. In January 2022 the numbers included 62 Fellows, 1535 Members, 444 Associates, 301 Students and 87 Corporates, along with a handful of honorary and concessionary members, making a total of 3165, although the Institute's Annual Review for 2024-2025 showed a slight decline in total membership to 2919. Members are bound by the institute's Code of Professional Conduct. Fellows and Qualified Members are entitled to use the postnominals FITI and MITI; the equivalent AITI for Associates was abolished when the precise definition of 'Associate' changed several times in around 2005, but was reinstated in 2013.

== Member Magazine ==
Originally called ITI News, the member magazine was known as the ITI Bulletin until it was renamed to ITI Insight in 2026. The magazine, is published four times a year and has an estimated readership of 7000. As well as publicising ITI events, including conferences, workshops etc., it contains articles relating to translating and interpreting. Some editions include interviews with authors and articles on world issues running alongside regular features on the pitfalls of poor translation, reviews of translation software, taxation, money matters, and the many uses of translation and interpreting.

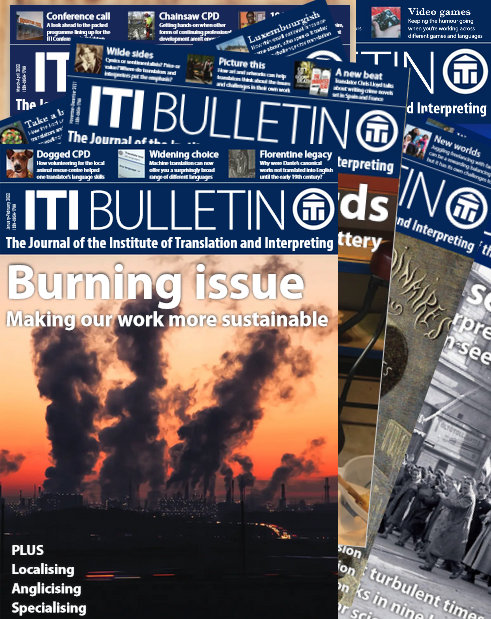
A collage of ITI Bulletin covers

== Conference ==
One of the highlights in the ITI Calendar is its conference, held every two years at different venues across the UK. The last face-to-face event before the pandemic was held at Cutlers' Hall in Sheffield in May 2019 and was attended by 375 people, while previous editions in recent years were held in locations such as Cardiff, Newcastle, Gatwick Airport, Birmingham and London. In years when there is no conference, the Institute organises a one-day event, with the first held in London in 2018. It was planned to hold the next event in Bristol in June 2020, but this had to be cancelled due to COVID-19. ITI's 2021 conference was held online in May 2021. As Covid restrictions were reduced, the 2022 conference was held as a hybrid event, online and in Brighton on 31 May - 1 June 2022. 250 people attended the event, held at the Grand Hotel, Brighton, with a similar number online. Sessions were held across four streams, with three focused on translation, while the fourth stream was devoted to interpreting matters. In 2023, ITI held two one-day events, the first took place in Harpenden in May and the second in Manchester in September.

In 2024, the ITI Conference was held in Edinburgh on 4–5 June. Once again, it was a hybrid event, with 300 people on-site at the John McIntyre Conference Centre, with a further 120 watching online. The event had four streams, following the same format as the previous conference, with access to recordings available for a full year after the event.

The 2026 Annual Conference followed a different format with contributions from the wider business space. Entitled EX:CHANGE 2026 and marking the ITI's 40th anniversary year, it took place on 1-2 July at Unity Place, Milton Keynes.

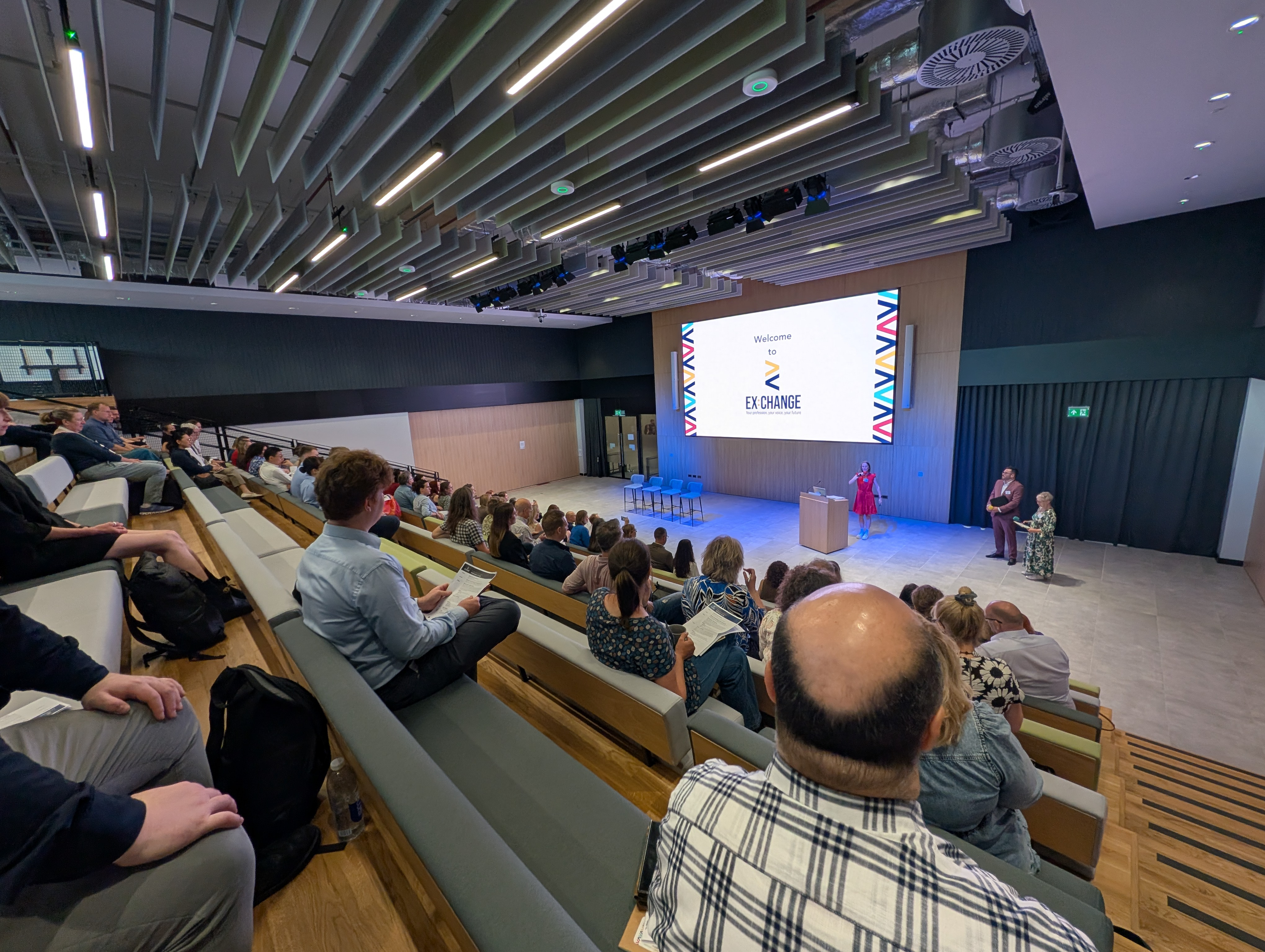
ITI Chair (at the time) Fiona Gray kicks off EX:CHANGE in Milton Keynes

== Covid-19 ==
During the COVID-19 pandemic, the ITI continued to work to support its members by moving events online. During the early part of the first UK lockdown, an online coffee morning was held weekly, along with other online webinars offering training in a range of subjects. These were supplemented by online activities and events offered by regional groups and networks. Online events have continued and been developed into a permanent feature of the post-Covid CPD offering, with members getting access to a library of past events.

== ITI networks ==
From the beginning, ITI members have sought to form groups based on regional, language and specialist lines. ITI has groups across all geographical areas of United Kingdom, including the ITI Scottish Network, ITI Cymru Wales, ITI London Regional Group. Language groups such as the German Network, Polish Network, French Network and Japanese Network (J-Net), as well as subject-based networks such as STEP and infotech, maintain internet-based groups for purposes such as the clarification of terminological queries, discussion of best practice, sharing work, and organizing social events.
