= Group dating =

Organizing dates as part of a group

Group dating is a modern pattern for dating where a group of single people organize a night out, with the hope of forming romantic partnerships. It is most popular in Japan, where it is known as gōkon. In the U.S., group dating is becoming a safer alternative to single dating (especially blind dating), which also helps to ease tension, because both parties will feel more comfortable having the company of their friends.

Group dating is often recommended by parenting experts as more age appropriate form of dating for preteens than one-on-one dating.

== Japan ==
A gōkon (合コン) is a type of group blind date in Japan, commonly organized to encourage socializing and potential romantic connections between two single-sex groups. Typically, a man and a woman who know each other arrange the gathering, each inviting several single friends. These events are usually held in informal venues such as restaurants or izakaya, where food, drinks, and conversation are encouraged.

The term gōkon comes from the Japanese words konpa (a party for members of a single group, class, or club) and gōdō ("together", "combination"). Generally speaking, gōkon are not primarily intended to result in one-night stands (something more associated with nanpa), but rather for making new acquaintances and possibly forming long-term relationships. Typically groups of men and women will sit opposite each other and converse with one another, while simultaneously whispering discussions with their same-sex peers about which potential partners they find attractive. Sometimes games are played to reduce tension and encourage a convivial atmosphere.

Since the advent of mobile phones, texting on and showing it to others has become popular as an alternative to whispering.

== United Kingdom ==
Gōkon-style events have also developed independently at Oxford and Cambridge universities, where they are known as 'crewdate' or 'swap', respectively.

== United States ==
According to an article in USA Today:

Group online dating, its creators and practitioners say, is safer than traditional Internet dating: With friends in tow, there's little fear that a date will spike your drink during a trip to the bathroom. It's more natural, akin to happy-hour mixing. Going out in groups improves your odds, at least in theory. And if the opposing social circle doesn't live up to its virtual profile, well, it's a night out with your gang."

According to a San Diego Union-Tribune article:

[The Concept] is part of a growing trend in the lucrative online dating market – harnessing the power of friends. Several sites are tapping into the idea that most real-world relationships begin, like it or not, with the help and influence of friends and family.

== See also ==
- Culture of Japan
- Online dating service

== General and cited references ==
- Azuma, Hiroki "Azzie" (21 September 2004). "Mobile Dating in Japan". The Mobile Technology Weblog. Creative Weblogging. Archived from the original on 21 December 2004.
- evankirby (16 April 2006). "16/04: GenkiJACS' first "goukon"". GenkiJACS. Genki Japanese and Culture School.
- "Middle-aged gals hooked on swinging matchmaking parties". Mainichi Shimbun. September 12, 2001.
- Takano, Yuko (24 May 2004). "An Introduction to the Somewhat Strange Dating Practices of the Japanese People". The Stanford Business Reporter. Berkeley, Calif. Archived from the original on 27 September 2007.
