= Cymdeithas Cyfieithwyr Cymru =

Representative translators body in Wales

- Abbreviation: CCC
- Nickname: Association of Welsh Translators and Interpreters
- Formation: 1976; 50 years ago
- Purpose: Association for English/Welsh translators and interpreters
- Region served: Wales
- Affiliations: International Federation of Translators

Cymdeithas Cyfieithwyr Cymru (transl. the association of Welsh translators [and interpreters]) is a professional body representing translators and interpreters, between the English and Welsh languages, in Wales. The association has some 340 members, most of whom are translators; less than a quarter are interpreters. Cymdeithas Cyfieithwyr Cymru is a member of the International Federation of Translators (FIT).

== History ==
Cymdeithas Cyfieithwyr Cymru was established in 1976 to provide a forum for the discussion of issues relating to Welsh/English translation and interpreting. Its goal is to ensure professional translation standards are upheld in the field of Welsh/English translation and interpreting. The association also advises the Welsh Language Commissioner on translation issues.

== See also ==
- Wales Interpretation and Translation Service
