= Bōnenkai =

Japanese drinking party

Bōnenkai 忘年会
- Genre: Party
- Date: December
- Frequency: Annually
- Inaugurated: 15th century

A bōnenkai (忘年会; literally "forget the year gathering") is a Japanese drinking party that takes place at the end of the year and is generally held among groups of co-workers or friends. The purpose of the party, as its name implies, is to forget the woes and troubles of the past year, and hopefully look to the new year, usually by consumption of large amounts of alcohol. A bōnenkai does not take place on any specific day, but they are usually held within December.

Bōnenkai are observed by parties of friends or co-workers or sponsored by a company or business office for their employees. Bōnenkai are not part of the New Year shogatsu celebration which lasts until 3 January; they are instead a way of ending the year through a group celebration. The tradition started in the 15th century during the Muromachi period as gatherings to express thanks. At that time, the parties were known as nōkai (納会, "great achievement gathering"). By the 18th century, they had become known as bōnenkai, or year-end parties.

Bōnenkai are seen as times for bureikō (無礼講) or letting one's hair down and not worrying about the boss/employee formal relationship or the rank and age divisions.

When a business decides to have a bōnenkai, they take into account several things before planning a party. Some of their concerns are to ensure that enough of the employees and management will attend. They also try to set a generalized cost of no more than 5,000 yen per person; this is used to cover the cost of the party and to not discourage employees from attending a party that is too expensive. Some companies pay the entire cost of the party and will at times opt to not have the party at a traditional izakaya (restaurant and drinking places where the majority of bōnenkai are held) and instead have it on the business premises and save a lot of money in the process.

== History ==
Since the late 16th century, banquets and parties have been held with similar intentions as the modern-day bōnenkai. On the 30th of December, groups of samurai lords would gather to observe what they called "The Forgetting of the Year". It consisted of typical upper-class activities like writing and reciting poetry, and was followed by a large feast. These types of parties did not become commonplace in the regular populace of Japan until the abolishment of the feudal ruling system in the late 19th century. Around the same time period, a story written by Japanese author Tsubouchi Shōyō entitled 忘年会 was published in a newspaper. It depicted one of these parties, which featured boisterous discussion, prolific drinking, and entertaining Geishas. In post-occupation Japan, the "lifetime employment systems" established by some companies incorporated many company-organized events, one usually being an end-of-the-year Bōnenkai in December.

== See also ==
- Shinnenkai, New Year gathering in January
