= Blue Badge tourist guide =

Professional Tourist Guides in the United Kingdom

London Blue Badge © Institute of Tourist Guiding.

The Blue Badge tourist guide is a guide who has been certified as a qualified and accredited guide for tourists in the United Kingdom.

== History ==
The England Guides’ Badge

The Scottish Guides’ Badge

The Wales Guides’ Badge

The initial certifying organization, originally called the Guild of Guide Lecturers, was founded to identify qualified tourist guides for the Festival of Britain in 1951. After being renamed several times, it became the Guild of Registered Tourist Guides and more recently the British Guild of Tourist Guides. In 2002, the Institute of Tourist Guiding was established to accredit tourist guide training programmes, assess qualifications and language proficiency, accredit trainers, and award badges.

== Qualification ==
The Institute of Tourist Guiding examines and accredits guides in England. In Scotland, the Scottish Tourist Guides Association (STGA) sets the standards and accredits all the training courses. All Blue Badge guides must pass the institute's exams or the STGA's exams. They study for up to two years at university level, taking a comprehensive series of written and practical exams which qualify them to become Blue Badge Tourist Guides.

To qualify, potential guides must complete an extensive curriculum and pass exams. The Institute of Tourist Guiding awards three different badges:

- The blue badge identifies a tourist guide who has qualified for guided walks, guiding at sites, and guiding in moving vehicles, in a specified region.
- The green badge identifies a tourist guide who has qualified for guided walks and at sites in a city, town, borough, or area of the countryside.
- The white badge identifies a tourist guide who has qualified for either guiding at a specific site or for a guided walk along a fixed route.
