= Shinnenkai =

Japanese Tradition

A shinnenkai (Japanese: 新年会, literally "new year gathering") is the Japanese tradition of welcoming the arrival of the New Year, usually by the drinking of alcohol.

A shinnenkai is generally held among co-workers or friends in January. Like the many festivals (matsuri) and celebrations that the Japanese are known for, a shinnenkai is their way of getting together to celebrate a new year and to make promises to each other to do their best for this year while wishing each other good luck and fortune.

A shinnenkai is similar to a bōnenkai in several ways with just a few exceptions. Both are observed by parties of friends or co-workers or sponsored by a company for their employees. Bōnenkai and shinnenkai are not part of the New Year Shogatsu celebration which lasts until the 3rd of January; they are instead a way of ending and beginning the year through a group celebration. At a shinnenkai however, some of the Shogatsu festivities can carry over to the New Year’s party like the making of mochitsuki by pounding sweet steamed rice or kagamiwari which is the breaking open of sake barrels with a wooden hammer and drinking together.

This tradition started in the 15th century during the Muromachi period as gatherings to express one's thanks for each other. At that time, the party was known as nōkai (great achievement gathering). Later on in the 18th century a new word was appearing in writings and was since then was known as a bōnenkai or year-end party and a shinnenkai is the same type of celebration.

Although the Japanese have always been a people of great feeling and emotion as in the expression mono no aware, they are more reserved in expressing their feelings to others, so the shinnenkai has been a way of showing public displays of gratitude. This is especially true for the company or business office shinnenkai where they can do bureikō or let their hair down and not worry about the boss/employee formal relationship or the rank and age divisions and have a good time.

When a business decides to have a shinnenkai they take into account several things before planning a party. Some of their concerns are to ensure that enough of the employees and management will attend. They also try to set a generalized cost of no more than 5,000 yen per person; this is used to cover the cost of the party and to not discourage employees from attending a party that is too expensive. Some companies pay the entire cost of the party and will at times opt to not have the party at a traditional izakaya (restaurant and drinking places where the majority of shinnenkai are held) and instead have it on the business premises and save a lot of money in the process.

Statistically, more people attend bōnenkai than shinnenkai parties. The majority of those that celebrate a shinnenkai are office co-workers, rather than friends.

== See also ==
- Bōnenkai, forget the year gathering in December
