= Public service interpreters in the UK =

Language translation service

Public service interpreting in the UK is used by police, courts, immigration services, solicitors, local government, health providers and every other part of the public services that has a language need.

== The interpreting profession ==
Most interpreters are self-employed and are hired on a job by job basis, not knowing when, or where, their next assignment may take them. The availability of Registered Interpreters varies across the UK. There is a range of ways the interpreter may be engaged by public service users: by direct contact using the National Register https://www.nrpsi.org.uk/for-clients-of-interpreters/why-use-a-registered-interpreter.html or the interpreter's own website, via interpreting agencies, or as part of a government framework covering departmental or regional requirements.

== Protection of the public ==
A number of tragic examples have resulted in government reports indicating the importance of professional interpreting.

In 1981, Iqbal Begum, a non-English speaker, was convicted of the murder of her husband and sentenced to life imprisonment. It was discovered by accident a number of years later that she had understood very little of what was happening in her trial, or the exact crime for which she was being tried. The court had used an accountant who did not speak Mrs Begum's dialect to act as the language mediator.

In the 1985 R v Iqbal Begum Court of Appeal ruling the need for defendants in court to be able to understand the proceedings, using an interpreter if necessary, was identified: "It is beyond the understanding of this court that it did not occur to someone that the reason for her [the defendant's] silence....... was simply because she was not being spoken to in a language which she understood." As a result of the appeal Mrs Begum was released, but she never recovered from the disgrace of the original conviction and serving four years in jail, and some years later took her own life.

The death of seven-year-old Victoria Climbié in February 2000 as a result of failures in child protection led to the public inquiry by Lord Laming. Lord Laming's report highlighted failures on the part of various public services, including health services, social services and the police. Victoria's first language was not English and there were significant language difficulties in the case: her great-aunt Marie-Therese Kouao claimed to speak no English. At no time was Victoria interviewed alone with the aid of an interpreter. Instead, language mediation between Victoria and the English-speaking public services was provided by Kouao, the woman ultimately found to be jointly responsible for Victoria's death.

The lack of ‘suitable interpreters’ is also highlighted as an issue in a major maternal deaths study (now called Confidential Enquiry into Maternal Deaths in the UK): “A lack of availability of suitable interpreters is one of the key findings running throughout this Report. The use of family members… or members of their own, usually tight-knit, community as translators causes concern.” Reinforcing the dangers of using a family member to interpret when they could be the perpetrator of abuse against the party they are interpreting for, the study reports a victim as saying: “Even if the perpetrator isn’t with you, he sends one of his family members with you. And in the name of honour you can’t ever talk about it. Especially if they say ‘I’m going to interpret because she can’t speak English’.”

The absence of professional language services occurred in the events leading to the death of five-year-old Daniel Pelka in March 2012. Family members and perpetrators of the crime were the ones used to interpret between the victim and the public services. Reporting in the Serious Case Review for the Coventry Safeguarding Children Board in September 2013, Dr Neil Fraser said about Daniel Pelka: “Without proactive or consistent action by any professional to engage with him via an interpreter, then his lack of language and low confidence would likely have made it almost impossible for him to reveal the abuse he was suffering at home.”

The Independent Review of Quality Arrangements under the Ministry of Justice Language Services Framework Agreement (the 'Matrix Report') in December 2014 reported that 50% of respondents working for Capita TI did not hold even one of the top ten qualifications needed for interpreting in the justice sector. Capita TI holds the Ministry of Justice contract to provide interpreters and translators in courts, tribunals and prisons until October 2016. The Matrix Report supported independent regulation of the interpreting profession.

== National register ==
The 1993 Runciman Royal Commission on Criminal Justice recommended that a national register of qualified interpreters should be established with the aim of "using only interpreters with proven competence and skills, who are governed by a nationally recognised code of conduct".

Following an initial project which received Home Office financial support, in 1994 the Nuffield Foundation invited tenders to run an interpreting register. This was awarded to the Institute of Linguists (now the Chartered Institute of Linguists) and the National Register was born. At the same time the relevant graduate-level qualification, now called the Diploma in Public Service Interpreting, was established and continues to be offered by the IoL Educational Trust.

In 1998 the Trials Issues Group recommended the exclusive use of the National Register when selecting interpreters for criminal investigations and court proceedings. The need for a national register was confirmed by Lord Justice Auld's 2001 Review of the Criminal Courts of England and Wales.

The National Agreement on Arrangements for the Use of Interpreters, Translators and Language Service Professionals in Investigations and Proceedings within the Criminal Justice System (the ‘National Agreement’), published in revised form in 2007 by the Office for Criminal Justice Reform standardised the working relationships with interpreters and specified that spoken-language interpreters should be sourced from the NRPSI. This quality standard was dispensed with by the Ministry of Justice when they outsourced interpreting services to the commercial company ALS in 2012, leading to many problems and criticism from the UK Parliament.

NRPSI became independent of the Chartered Institute of Linguists in April 2011 and is now an independent not-for-profit organisation.

The National Register of Public Service Interpreters (NRPSI) is an independent not-for-profit organisation that regulates the standards for interpreters working in the public services in the UK. The principal aim is to protect the public from poor standards of interpreting. Known by interpreters and users alike as the National Register, or just ‘the Register’, NRPSI manages the UK's largest register of accredited interpreters.

The three-year strategy published by NRPSI in 2016 states that the organisation's ultimate goal is statutory regulation of the public service interpreting profession which would make it illegal for unregistered interpreters to work for the public services.

== Current status ==
There is a strong drive for recognition of interpreting as a profession in the UK despite government moves to de-recognise professional status. Increased immigration as a result of EU policies has led to greater recognition of the need for governments to facilitate communication between different language speakers and provide entitlement to interpreting and translation services. NRPSI has taken part in the LIT Search project funded by the Criminal Justice Programme of the European Commission Directorate General Justice, which aims to link the European national registers to aid cross-border interpreting requirements.

Due to the voluntary nature of the regulation by the National Register, many interpreters work in the UK without registration and appropriate qualifications. It is therefore not known how many interpreters are working regularly, nor how many assignments they are completing. The Ministry of Justice reported that in the courts system (probably the largest user of interpreting services in the UK) there were 153,500 requests during the year 2015.

NRPSI identified eight key challenges facing the interpreting profession, including the downward pressure on quality standards as a result of financial constraints on public services, the need to ensure that qualified interpreters maintain their skills throughout their career, and the lack of a clear career path. NRPSI's stated long-term aims are protection of title and statutory regulation of public service interpreting to better protect the public.
