= Japan Association of Translators =

Professional association of translators and interpreters in Japan

The Japan Association of Translators (JAT) is the largest professional association of practicing translators and interpreters in Japan, with approximately 800 members. The association was founded in 1985.

Membership is open to any individual with an interest in translation and interpreting between English and Japanese as a profession or as a scholarly pursuit. Members include, but are not limited to, translators, interpreters, teachers, and project managers.

JAT is affiliated with the International Federation of Translators (FIT). Its home office is in Tokyo, Japan.

== See also ==
- List of Japanese interpreting and translation associations
