= List of Japanese interpreting and translation associations =

The translation/interpreting profession and industry in Japan is very fragmented, with a plethora of associations, many funded by tests marketed as 'qualifications'.

== Primarily translation ==
- Japan Society of Translators (JST) ja:日本翻訳家協会

Founded in 1934, backed by the Ministry of Education (Japan) and Ministry of Foreign Affairs (Japan). Primarily literary; original/official representative of the International Federation of Translators.

- National Translation Institute of Science and Technology ja:日本科学技術翻訳協会

Founded in 1966, foundered in 1995. Had 13,000 “Licensed Technical Translators”.

- Japan Translation Federation (JTF) ja:日本翻訳連盟

Founded in 1981, backed by the Ministry of International Trade and Industry. Despite a perception that members are primarily agencies, it has 130 corporates and 300 individual members.

- National Council of Professional Translators ja:全国職業翻訳者協議会

Founded in 1993 by Itagaki Shinpei, also a director of JTF, and winner of Asahi Shimbun, Japan Times and Itabashi Bologna Book Fair prizes. Apparently inactive from around 2012 due to Itagaki's ill health.

- Society of Writers, Editors and Translators (SWET)

Formed in 1980. Gave birth to JAT, but still has its own translator members, with a bias towards translators working for publication (somewhat like JST, but mainly Gaijin). Publishes the well-known Japan Style Sheet.

- Japan Association of Translators ja:日本翻訳者協会

Formed from SWET in 1985. Over 700 members, predominantly non-Japanese. Organizes biennial IJET International Japanese-English Translation conferences, monthly meetings and social events.

- Japan Translation Association (JTA) ja:日本翻訳協会

Founded in 1986, backed by the Ministry of Labour (Japan). Connected with the BABEL university and publishing group.

- Japan Association for Interpretation & Translation Studies (JAITS) ja:日本通訳翻訳学会

Founded in 1990 as the Interpretation Research Association of Japan (IRAJ) ja:通訳理論研究会, later becoming the Japan Association for Interpretation Studies (JAIS) ja:日本通訳学会 in 2000 and the current name in 2008. Around 350 members.

- Nippon Intellectual Property Translation Association (NIPTA) ja:日本知的財産翻訳協会

Founded in 2004 by private company Chizai Corporation, focused on patents.

- Wycliffe Bible Translators Japan ja:日本ウィクリフ聖書翻訳協会

Founded in 1968, following on from the ja:日本聖書翻訳協力会 (founded 1966).

- Asia-Pacific Association for Machine Translation (AAMT) ja:アジア太平洋機械翻訳協会

Founded in 1991, originally as ja:日本機械翻訳協会.

- IT Software Translator Certification Association ja:ITソフトウェア翻訳士認定協会

A collaboration between 5 private translation agencies.

== Primarily interpreting ==
- Medical Interpreters & Translators Association (MITA)

Organized at Tokyo Medical University by J.P. Barron and Raoul Breugelmans, 1993-2012. It was an offshoot from JAT, focused on helping Japanese doctors communicate in English, with links throughout the world and some government funding. It created training resources such as actual video interviews with patients in Leicestershire (having various accents), and a 3-way glossary (Japanese, doctors' English, patients' English).

- Japan Association for Health Care Interpreting in Japanese and English (J.E.) ja:日本英語医療通訳協会

Founded in 2006, but website apparently defunct as of around 2010.

- International Medical Interpreters Association (IMIA) ja:国際医療通訳士協議会

Has a Japan Chapter and West Japan Chapter, founded in 2008. The parent body was founded in 1986 in Massachusetts, and went 'international' in 2007; it has around 2000 members in total, and incorporates the (American) National Board of Certification for Medical Interpreters.

- Japan Association of Medical Interpreters (JAMI) ja:医療通訳士協議会

Founded in 2011.

- International Medical Interpreters and Translators Association (IMEDIATA) ja:りんくう国際医療通訳翻訳協会

Founded in 2011; around 30 members.

- Medical Interpreting Association of Japan (MIAJ) ja:日本医療通訳協会

Founded in 2014.

- Japan Interpreters‘ Association (JIPTA) ja:日本通訳協会

Founded 1973, foundered 2008. Around 130,000 took its tests (通訳技能検定試験(通検) + ボランティア通訳検定試験（V通検）), of whom 38,000 passed.

- Foreign Languages Interpreting Certificate Association (FLICA) ja:外国語通訳検定協会

Founded in 2011.

- Japan Association of Conference Interpreters ja:日本会議通訳者協会

Founded in 2015; around 200 members (25 certified). Organizes annual JIF Japan Interpreting Forum conferences, quarterly seminars, and social events.

- International Association of Conference Interpreters (AIIC)

Founded 1953. Not Japan-centric, but has 8 interpreters based in Japan.

- Japanese Association of Sign Language Interpreters (JASLI) ja:日本手話通訳士協会

Founded in 1991. 3000 members.

== Primarily tourist guides ==
- Japan Guide Association (JGA) ja:日本観光通訳協会
- Japan Federation of Certified Guides (JFG) ja:全日本通訳案内士連盟
- The Japan Association of Interpreter-Tour Guides ja:日本通訳案内士研鑽会
- Japan Guide Consortium (JGC) ja:日本通訳案内士連合
- Institute for Japanese Culture Experience & Exchange ja:日本文化体験交流塾
- Korean Guide Organization (KGO) ja:全日本韓国語通訳案内士会
- Chinese Language Guide-Interpreter Association of Japan (CLGIAJ) ja:中国語通訳案内士会
- Guide-Interpreting & Communication Skill Studies Association (GICSS) ja:通訳ガイド＆コミュニケーション・スキル研究会
- Japan Culture Club (JCC) ja:通訳案内士「日本文化と歴史探訪会」
- Tochigi Association of Certified Interpreters & Guides (TOTAK) ja:栃木県通訳案内士協会
- Mt Fuji Yamanashi Guide-Interpreter Association ja:富士の国やまなし通訳案内士会
- ja:やまなし通訳ガイドの会
- Licensed Interpreter-guide Net Kanazawa ja:石川通訳案内士協会
- Kansai Interpreter & Guide Association (KIGA) ja:関西通訳・ガイド協会
- Hiroshima Interpreter & Guide Association ja:ひろしま通訳・ガイド協会
- Kyushu Tsuyaku Guide (KTG) ja:九州通訳・ガイド協会
- Okinawa Interpreter Guide Association (OIGA) ja:沖縄通訳案内士会
