= Senpai and kōhai =

Japanese hierarchical relationship

Senpai (先輩, "senior") and kōhai (後輩, "junior") are Japanese terms used to describe an informal hierarchical interpersonal relationship found in organizations, associations, clubs, businesses, and schools in Japan and expressions of Japanese culture worldwide. The senpai and kōhai relationship has its roots in Confucianism, but has developed a distinctive Japanese style. The term senpai can be considered a term in Japanese honorifics.

== Concept ==
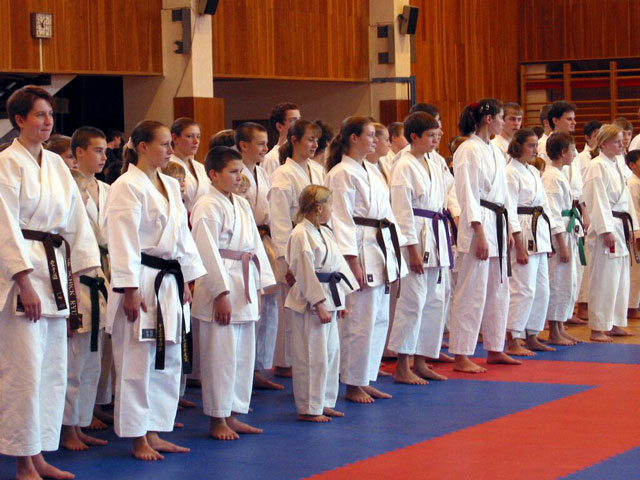
The senpai–kōhai relation has spread through Japanese martial arts, in which the members of different kyū and dan levels are sorted by belt colour.

The relationship is an interdependent one, as a senpai requires a kōhai and vice versa, and establishes a bond determined by the date of entry into an organization. Senpai refers to the member of higher experience, hierarchy, level, or age in the organization who offers assistance, friendship, and counsel to a new or inexperienced member, known as the kōhai, who must demonstrate gratitude, respect, and occasionally personal loyalty. The kōhai defers to the senpai's seniority and experience, and speaks to the senpai using honorific language. The senpai acts at the same time as a friend. This relation is similar to the interpersonal relation between tutor and tutored in Eastern culture, but differs in that the senpai and kōhai must work in the same organization.

The relation originates in Confucian teaching, as well as the morals and ethics that have arrived in Japan from ancient China and have spread throughout various aspects of Japanese philosophy. The senpai–kōhai relation is a vertical hierarchy (like a father–son relation) that emphasizes respect for authority, for the chain of command, and for one's elders, eliminating all forms of internal competition and reinforcing the unity of the organization.

Over time this mechanism has allowed the transfer of experience and knowledge, as well as the expansion of acquaintances and the building of institutional memory. It also allows the development of beneficial experiences between both, as the kōhai benefits from the senpai's knowledge and the senpai learns new experiences from the kōhai by way of developing a sense of responsibility. This comradeship does not imply friendship; a senpai and kōhai may become friends, but such is not an expectation.

The Korean terms seonbae and hubae are written with the same Chinese characters and indicate a similar senior–junior relationship. Both the Japanese and Korean terms are based on the Chinese honorifics xianbei (先輩/先辈) and houbei (後輩/后辈), written in the same Chinese characters.

Similar concept exists in the Chinese-speaking world, though the terms vary depending on the context. In business, the terms are usually qiánbèi (前輩/前辈) for seniors and hòubèi (後輩/后辈) for juniors. For students, the term is usually xuézhǎng/xuéjiě (學長/姐, more common in Taiwan) or shīxiōng/shījiě (师兄/姐, mainland China) for male and female senpai, respectively, and xuédì/xuémèi (學弟/妹, Taiwan) or shīdì/shīmèi (师弟/妹, mainland China) for male and female kohai, respectively. The student terms are also used in the Taiwanese military and the police system, though the existence of this seniority system in parallel to the ranks is criticized.

== History ==
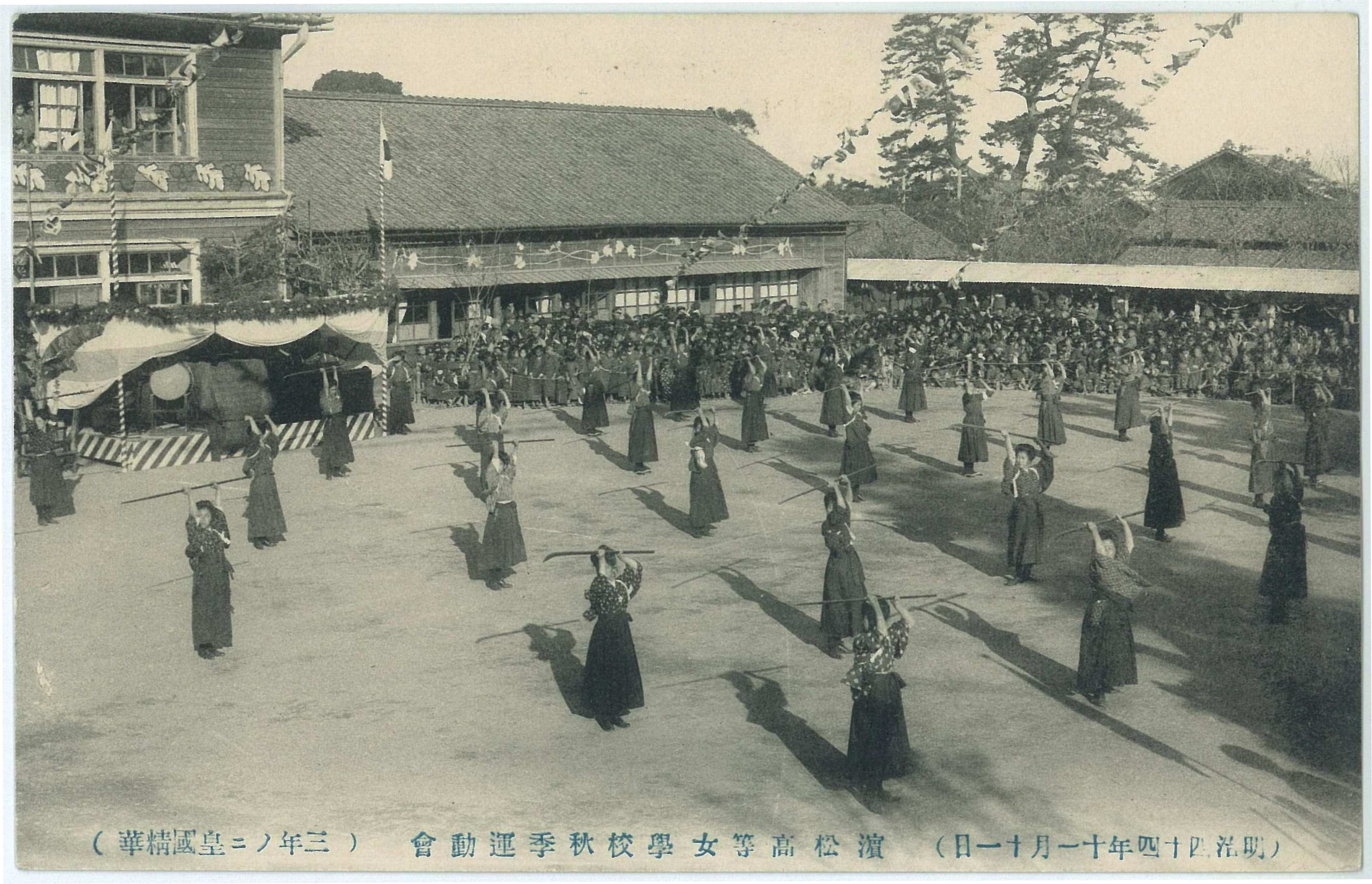
Demonstrating the use of the naginata at a sports festival in Hamamatsu in 1911. Discipline training in school clubs historically has influenced the senpai–kōhai system with students.

The senpai–kōhai system is deeply rooted in Japanese history. Three elements have had a significant impact on its development: Confucianism, the traditional Japanese family system, and the Civil Code of 1898.

Confucianism arrived from China between the 6th and 9th centuries, but the derived line of thought that brought about deep social changes in Japan was Neo-Confucianism, which became the official doctrine of the Tokugawa shogunate (1603–1867). The precepts of loyalty and filial piety as tribute (朝貢 chōkō) dominated the Japanese at the time, as respect for elders and ancestor worship that Chinese Confucianism taught were well accepted by the Japanese, and these influences have spread throughout daily life. Like other Chinese influences, the Japanese adopted these ideas selectively and in their own manner, so that the "loyalty" in Confucianism was taken as loyalty to a feudal lord or the Emperor.

The Japanese family system (家 ie) was also regulated by Confucian codes of conduct and had an influence on the establishment of the senpai–kōhai relation. In this family system the father, as male head, had absolute power over the family and the eldest son inherited the family property. The father had power because he was the one to receive an education and was seen to have superior ethical knowledge. Since reverence for superiors was considered a virtue in Japanese society, the wife and children had to obey it. In addition to the hereditary system, only the eldest son could receive his father's possessions, and neither the eldest daughter nor the younger children received anything from him.

The last factor influencing the senpai–kōhai system was the Civil Code of 1898, which strengthened the rules of privilege of seniority and reinforced the traditional family system, giving clear definitions of hierarchical values within the family. This was called koshusei (戸主制, "family-head system"), in which the head of the household had the right to command his family and the eldest son inherited that position. These statutes were abolished in 1947, after the surrender of Japan at the end of World War II. These ideals nevertheless remained during the following years as a psychological influence in Japanese society.

== Terminology ==
The seniority rules are reflected in various grammatical rules in the Japanese language. A person who speaks respectfully to a superior uses honorific language (敬語 keigo), which is divided into three categories:

- Sonkeigo (尊敬語, "respectful language"): Used to denote respect towards a superior with or of whom one speaks, including the actions, objects, characteristics, and people related to this person.
- Kenjōgo (謙譲語, "humble language"): In contrast to sonkeigo, with kenjōgo the speaker shows respect to a superior by lowering or deprecating him or herself.
- Teineigo (丁寧語, "polite language"): Differs from the other two in that the deference is afforded only to the person being addressed, rather than those being spoken about. Use of the verb desu ("to be") and the verb ending -masu are examples of teineigo.

Sonkeigo and kenjōgo have expressions (verbs, nouns, and special prefixes) particular to the type of language; for example, the ordinary Japanese verb for "to do" is suru, but in sonkeigo is nasaru and in kenjōgo is itasu.

Another rule in the hierarchical relation is the use of honorific suffixes of address. A senpai addresses a kōhai with the suffix -kun after the kōhai's given name or surname, regardless if the kōhai is male or female. A kōhai similarly addresses a senpai with the suffix -senpai or -san; it is extremely unusual for a kōhai to refer to a senpai with the suffix -sama, which indicates the highest level of respect to the person spoken to.

== Prevalence ==
One place the senpai–kōhai relation applies to its greatest extent in Japan is in schools. For example, in junior and senior high schools (especially in school clubs) third-year students (who are the oldest) demonstrate great power as senpai. It is common in school sports clubs for new kōhai to have to perform basic tasks such as retrieving balls, cleaning playing fields, taking care of equipment, and even wash elder students' clothes. They must also bow to or salute their senpai when congratulated, and senpai may punish kōhai or treat them severely.

The main reason for these humble actions is that it is believed that team members can become good players only if they are submissive, obedient, and follow the orders of the trainer or captain, and thus become a humble, responsible, and cooperative citizen in the future. Relations in Japanese schools also place a stronger emphasis on the age than on the abilities of students. The rules of superiority between a senpai and a kōhai are analogous to the teacher–student relation, in which the age and experience of the teacher must be respected and never questioned.

The senpai–kōhai relation is weaker in universities, as students of a variety of ages attend the same classes; students show respect to older members primarily through polite language (teineigo). Vertical seniority rules nevertheless prevail between teachers based on academic rank and experience.

The senpai–kōhai system also prevails in Japanese businesses. The social environment in Japanese businesses is regulated by two standards: the system of superiority and the system of permanent employment. The status, salary, and position of employees depend heavily of seniority, and veteran employees generally take the highest positions and receive higher salaries than their subordinates. Until the turn of the 20th and 21st centuries, employment was guaranteed for life and thus such employees did not have to worry about losing their positions.

The senpai–kōhai relation is a cornerstone in interpersonal relations within the Japanese business world; for example, at meetings the lower-level employee should sit in the seat closest to the door, called shimoza (下座, "lower seat"), while the senior employee (sometimes the boss) sits next to some important guest in a position called kamiza (上座, "upper seat"). During meetings, most employees do not give their opinions, but simply listen and concur with their superiors, although they can express opinions with the prior consent of the employees of greater rank and influence in the company.

Outside Japan, the senpai–kōhai relation is often found in the teaching of Japanese martial arts, though misunderstandings arise due to lack of historical knowledge, and as the vertical social hierarchy of Japan does not exist in cultures such as those in the West.

== Issues ==
Despite the senpai–kōhai relation's deep roots in Japanese society, there have been changes since the end of the 20th century in academic and business organizations. Kōhai no longer show as much respect to the experience of their senpai, the relation has become more superficial, and the age factor has begun to lose importance. The student body has diversified with Japanese students, who have spent a large part of their lives overseas and have returned to Japan, as well as foreign students without a mentality rooted in the Japanese hierarchical system.

The collapse of the economic bubble in the early 1990s caused a high level of unemployment, including the laying off of high-ranked employees. Companies since then first began to consider employees' skills rather than age or length of service with the company, due to which many long-serving employees lost their positions over being incapable of fulfilling expectations. Gradually many companies have had to restructure their salary and promotion systems, and seniority has thus lost some influence in Japanese society.

Attitudes towards the senpai–kōhai system vary from appreciation for traditions and the benefits of a good senpai–kōhai relationship; to reluctant acquiescence; to antipathy. Those who criticize the system find it arbitrary and unfair, that senpai were often pushy, and that the system results in students who are shy or afraid of standing out from the group. For example, some kōhai fear that if they outperform their senpai in an activity, their senpai will lose face, for which kōhai must apologize. In some cases, the relation is open to violence and bullying. Most Japanese people—even those who criticize it—accept the senpai–kōhai system as a common-sense aspect of society, straying from which would have inevitably negative social consequences.

== See also ==
- Etiquette in Japan
- Honne and tatemae
- Japanese honorifics
- Oyabun and kobun
- Sensei
