= Feinberg =

Feinberg, Feinberger; Russian: Фейнберг
Origin
- Language: Yiddish
- Meaning: fine, beautiful + mountain
- Region of origin: Ukraine, Russia, Soviet, Israel, United States

Other names
- Variant forms: Fein (< {fin, vin}), Feine, Feiner, Feinert, Feinbaum, Feinblatt, Feinbruck (Feinbruk, Feinbrik), Feinbuch (Feinbauch), Feinglas (Feinglass), Feingold (= Gingold), Feinknopf, Feinkohl (Feinkol), Feinkopf, Feinkuch (Feinkuchen), Feinmann, Feynman, Feinsilber, Feinsinger, Feinstadt (Feinstad), Feinstein, Feintuch (Fayntikh, Feintichel), Feinwachs (Feinwax); Schön Similar surnames: Feinschel; Feingenbaum; Feind (Feindt), Feindel, Feindl, Feindstein; Fehn; Feimann, Faimann

Feinberg is a surname. Notable people with the surname include:

- Aaron Feinberg, American rollerblading champion
- Abraham Feinberg (1899–1986), American rabbi and singer
- Ada Feinberg-Sireni (1930–2025), Israeli politician
- Andrew Feinberg, American journalist
- Andrew Feinberg (geneticist), American epigenetics academic
- Avshalom Feinberg (1889–1917), Jewish spy and martyr
- Baruch Feinberg (1933–2007), Israeli Olympic javelin thrower
- Benjamin F. Feinberg (1888–1959), New York politician
- Charles L. Feinberg (1909–1995), American biblical scholar, first dean of Talbot Theological Seminary
- Israel Lewis Feinberg (1872–1941), New York City coroner
- Gerald Feinberg (1933–1992), American physicist
- Ian Feinberg (1963–1993), Israeli lawyer murdered by Islamic terrorists in Gaza
- Jay Feinberg, American community activist and founder of Gift of Life Marrow Registry
- Joel Feinberg (1926–2004), American philosopher
- John Feinberg, American theologian
- Kenneth Feinberg, American attorney, Special Master of the September 11th Victim Compensation Fund
- Leon Feinberg, (1897–1969) Russian-American Yiddish poet and journalist
- Leslie Feinberg, transgender activist
- Louis Feinberg (1902–1975), birth name of Larry Fine, one of The Three Stooges
- Martin Feinberg, American mathematician
- Mildred Feinberg (1899–1990), American artist
- Paul Feinberg (1938–2004), American theologian
- Samuel Feinberg (1902–1989), birth name of Sammy Fain, American popular music composer
- Samuil Feinberg (1890–1962), Russian composer and pianist
- Sarah Feinberg (born 1977), American Interim President of the New York City Transit Authority, and former Administrator of the Federal Railroad Administration
- Savely Moiseevich Feinberg (1910–1973), Soviet nuclear physicist, chief engineer of the VVER reactor design
- Steve Feinberg, founder of Cerberus Capital Management

== See also ==
- 15569 Feinberg (asteroid)
- Feinberg School of Medicine at Northwestern University
