= Feinstein =

Feinstein, Finestein (Yiddish: פֿײַנשטײַן, Hebrew: פיינשטיין, Russian: Файнштейн, "Fajnsztajn", "Fajnsztejn" in Polish spelling) or anglicized as Finestone, meaning "fine stone", that is gemstone, is a compound surname of German and Yiddish origin, similar to names like Goldstein or Rubinstein which is relatively wide spread among Ashkenazi Jews. It may refer to:

== People with the name ==
=== Feinstein ===
- Aaron Feinstein (fl. 1903–1910), Estonian chess player
- Alan Feinstein (philanthropist) (1931–2024), American philanthropist
- Alvan Feinstein (1925–2001), American epidemiologist
- Andrew Feinstein (born 1964), South African politician
- Aryeh Löb Feinstein (1821–1903), Russian Jewish scholar
- Charles Feinstein (1932–2004), British economic historian
- Daniel Isaac Feinstein (born 1930), birth name of Swiss artist and author Daniel Spoerri
- Dianne Feinstein (1933–2023), American politician and US Senator from California
- Dovid Feinstein (1929–2020), American Orthodox rabbi, son of Moshe Feinstein
- Elaine Feinstein (1930–2019), British writer
- Genevieve Grotjan Feinstein (1912–2006), American cryptanalyst
- Guy Feinstein (1929-2008),French photographer and artist painter
- Harold Feinstein (1931–2015), American photographer
- Jeffrey Feinstein (born 1945), retired officer of the United States Air Force
- John Feinstein (1956–2025), American sportswriter and commentator
- Katherine Feinstein (born 1957), American judge
- Keith Feinstein, exhibition designer and video game researcher
- Meir Feinstein (1927–1947), Jewish underground fighter
- Michael Feinstein (born 1956), American singer and pianist
- Mike Feinstein, American Green Party politician
- Miles Feinstein (1941–2023), American criminal defense attorney and commentator
- Moshe Feinstein (1895–1986), American Orthodox rabbi
- Rachel Feinstein (born 1971), American sculptor
- Rachel Feinstein (born 1980), American stand-up comedian
- Reuven Feinstein (born 1937), American Orthodox Rabbi, son of Moshe Feinstein

=== Finestein ===
- Israel Finestein (1921–2009), English barrister

=== Feinstone ===
- Morris Feinstone (1878–1943), Jewish Polish-born British and American labor activist
  - SS Morris C. Feinstone, United States ship named after Feinstone
- Stephen Feinstone, virologist

=== Finestone ===
- Pete Finestone (born 1964), American drummer
- Sheila Finestone (1927–2009), Canadian politician

== Other uses ==
- Feinsteine, one of aggregate names of grain size (see German Korngröße article)

== See also ==
- Fein (disambiguation)
- Feinberg
- Feingold
- Feinman
- Feinmann
