= Gingold =

Gingold (Yiddish: גינגאָלד, Hebrew: גינגולד, Russian: Гингольд) is a Yiddish word and surname which may refer to:

- Alfred Gingold, American writer
- Chaim Gingold (born 1980), computer game designer
- Hermione Gingold (1897-1987), British actress
- Josef Gingold (1909-1995), Belarusian-Jewish violinist and teacher
- Kurt Gingold (1929–1997), Austrian-American scientific translator
- Michael Gingold, American screenwriter and journalist
- Peter Gingold (1916–2006), German Resistance figure and Holocaust survivor

It may also refer to:

- 15019 Gingold, a main-belt asteroid discovered in 1998
- "Gingold", the name of a fictitious brand of soda pop that DC Comics superhero Elongated Man drinks.

== See also ==
- Feingold, Finegold (same meaning)
