= Finegold (surname) =

Finegold is a surname. It is an alternate spelling of Feingold, meaning "fine gold". Notable people with this surname include:

- Avi Finegold, Canadian rabbi
- Barry Finegold (1971–), American politician
- Ben Finegold (1969–), American chess International Grandmaster
- Gina Linn Finegold, Belgian and American chess player
- Rachel Kohl Finegold, Canadian rabba
- Sydney M. Finegold (1921–2018), American physician and medical researcher

== See also ==
- Feingold
- Meital Slominsky, known by her stage name Mei Finegold
- Finegold Alexander Architects
