= Belaye Lake =

Belaye Vozera Белае Возера Белое Озеро
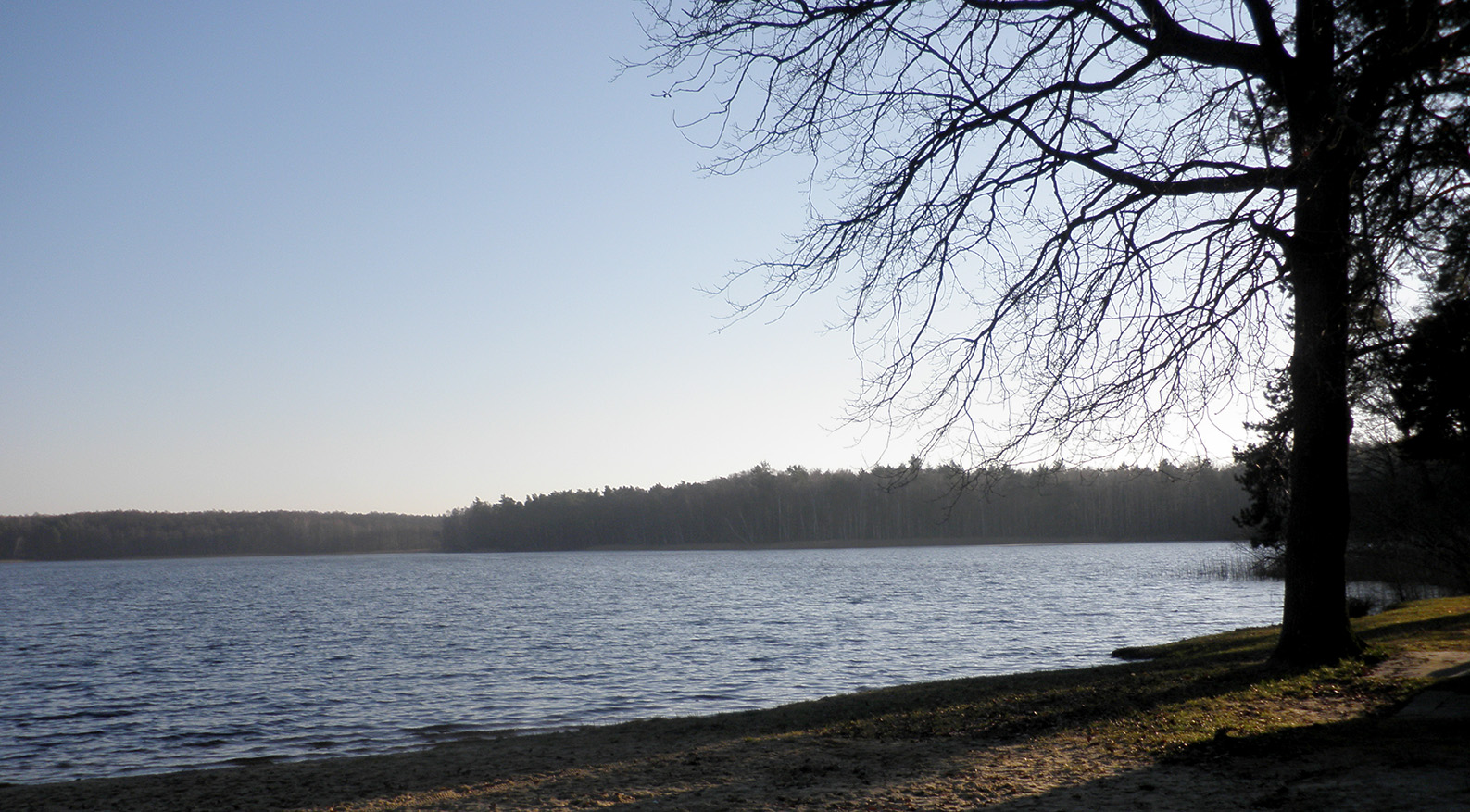
- Belaye Lake, the main attraction of the place.

- Location in Belarus
- Coordinates: 51°49′N 23°42′E
- Country: Belarus
- Region: Brest Region
- District: Brest District
- Time zone: UTC+2 (EET)
  - Summer (DST): UTC+3 (EEST)
- Area code: +375 (0)162

Belaye Vozera (Russian: Белое Озеро, Belarusian: Белае Возера, Polish: Białe Jezioro) is a rural settlement in Brest District of Brest Region of Belarus, located in the recreational area on the shore of Belaye (White) Lake, 25 km south of Brest, Belarus, 7 km east of the frontier with Poland, and 15 km from the border crossing Damačava-Sławatycze. A big recreational complex “Belaye vozera” was built here in the Soviet period. Chalet “Greenwood” comprising a hotel and a restaurant of European standard was built here in 2013
