= Feinman =

Feinman or Feinmann is a surname. Notable people with the surname include:

- Barbara Feinman, ghostwriter of It Takes a Village
- Barbara Feinman, milliner
- Dinah Shtettin (1862–1946), later Feinman, Yiddish theater actress
- Eduardo Feinmann (born 1958), Argentine journalist
- Gary M. Feinman (born 1951), American archaeologist
- Jay Feinman (born 1951), American legal scholar
- José Pablo Feinmann (1943–2021), Argentine philosopher and screenwriter
- Paul Feinman (1960–2021), American attorney
- Richard D. Feinman (born 1940), American biochemist

== See also ==
- Fein (disambiguation)
- Feynman (disambiguation)
- Fineman
