= Feen =

Feen may refer to:

- Die Feen, an 1888 opera by Richard Wagner
- BG Feen, a pioneer of hydrostatic weighing
- Feen Rainbow, a character in The Honey Siege, a British children's adventure television series
- Lutia Feen, a character in G-Darius, an arcade video game released in 1997
- FEEN (Field Expression Encoding Notation), a Shogi notation

== See also ==
- Andrew Vanderfeen (born 1955), sometimes spelled van der Feen, former Australian rules footballer
- Maas van der Feen (1888–1973), Dutch tennis player
- Fien, a feminine given name and surname
- Fein (disambiguation)
