= Kamianica Zhyravjeckaja =

Village in Belarus

Kamianica Zhyravjeckaja Камяніца Жыравецкая
- Village

- Location within Belarus
- Coordinates: 52°03′31″N 23°48′50″E
- Country: Belarus
- Region: Brest
- District: Brest
- Time zone: UTC+3 (MSK)

Kamianica Zhyravjeckaja (Belarusian: Камяніца Жыравецкая, Polish: Kamienica Żyrowiecka) is a village in the Brest District, Brest Region in southwestern Belarus.

== History ==
The village was located in the Brześć Litewski Voivodeship of the Polish–Lithuanian Commonwealth until the Third Partition of Poland in 1795, when it was annexed by Russia. Following World War I, it was part of reborn Poland, within which it was administratively located in the Polesie Voivodeship.

Following the joint German-Soviet invasion of Poland, which started World War II in September 1939, it was first occupied by the Soviet Union until 1941. Two local Polish policemen were murdered by the Russians in the Katyn massacre in 1940. From 1941 it was occupied by Nazi Germany, and from 1944 it was re-occupied by the Soviet Union, which eventually annexed it from Poland in 1945.
