= Stay in Love (disambiguation) =

Stay in Love is an album by Minnie Ripperton, and a song of the same name from that album. Other uses include:

- "Stay in Love", song by Hilary Duff from Breathe In. Breathe Out.
- "Stay in Love", song by Sam Sparro
- "Stay in Love", song by Uppermost from Origins (2011–2016)

== See also ==
- "I Stay in Love", 2008 Mariah Carey song
