= Kavyardzyaki =

Village in Brest Region, Belarus

Coordinates: 52°10′38″N 23°40′09″E

Kavyardzyaki or Koverdyaki (Belarusian: Кавярдзякі, romanized: Kaviardziaki; Russian: Ковердяки) is a village in Brest District, Brest Region, Belarus. It is part of Matykaly selsoviet.
