= Alan Feinstein =

Alan Feinstein may refer to:

- Alan Feinstein (philanthropist)
- Alan Feinstein (actor)
