= Zańków =

- Village
- Location within Poland
- Coordinates: 51°48′N 23°32′E
- Country: Poland
- Voivodeship: Lublin
- County: Biała
- Gmina: Sławatycze
- Time zone: UTC+1 (CET)
  - Summer (DST): UTC+2 (CEST)

Zańków [ˈzaɲkuf] is a village in the administrative district of Gmina Sławatycze, within Biała County, Lublin Voivodeship, in eastern Poland, close to the border with Belarus.

== History ==
Three Polish citizens were murdered by Nazi Germany in the village during World War II.
