= Sławatycze =

- Village
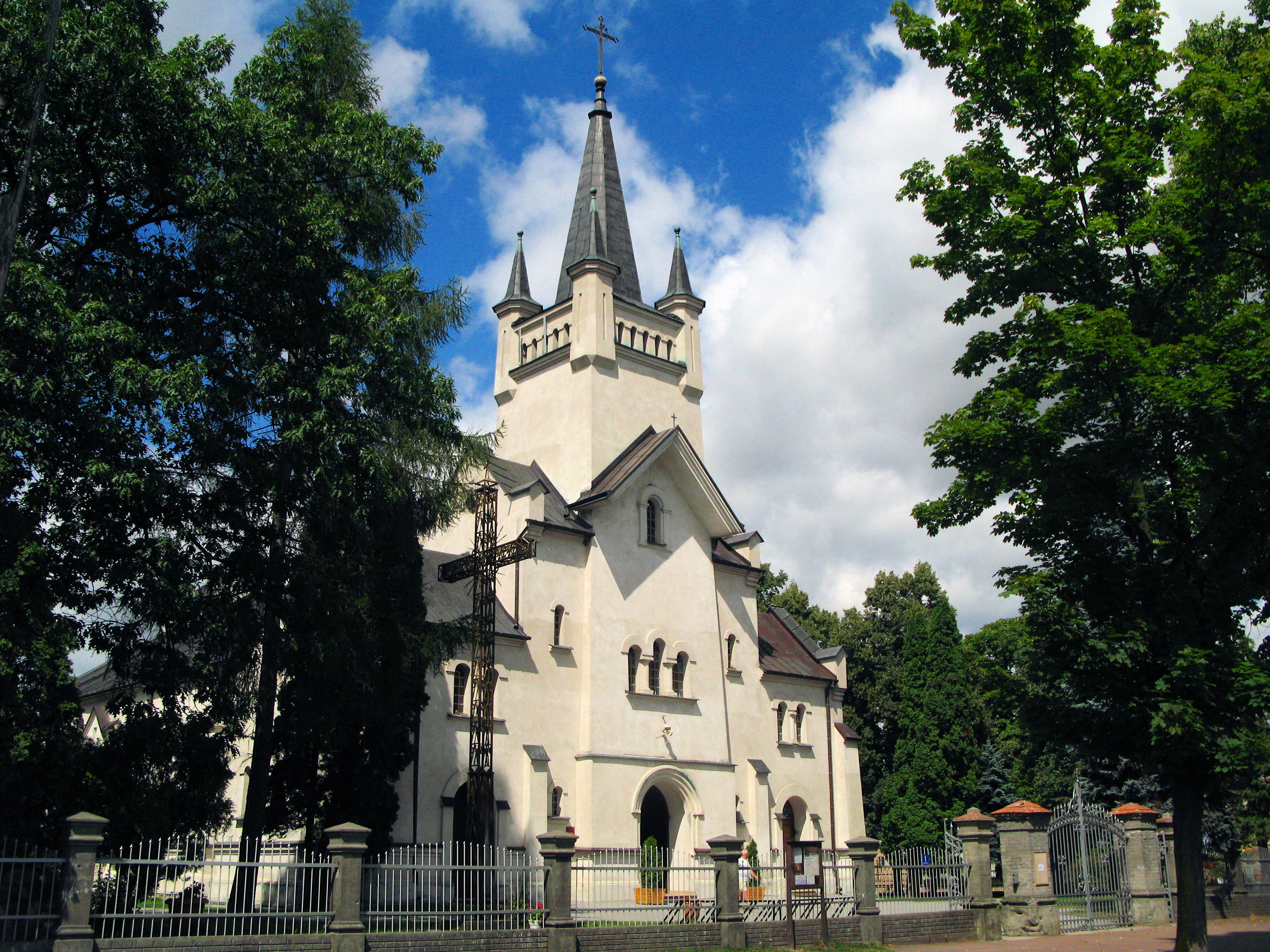
- Our Lady of the Rosary church in Sławatycze

- Location within Poland
- Coordinates: 51°45′N 23°33′E
- Country: Poland
- Voivodeship: Lublin
- County: Biała
- Gmina: Sławatycze

Population
  - Total: 2,738
- Time zone: UTC+1 (CET)
  - Summer (DST): UTC+2 (CEST)
- Vehicle registration: LBI

Sławatycze [swavaˈtɨt͡ʂɛ] is a village in Biała County, Lublin Voivodeship, in eastern Poland, close to the border with Belarus. It is the seat of the gmina (administrative district) called Gmina Sławatycze. It lies on the Bug River, directly opposite the settlement of Damachava.

== History ==
Sławatycze was granted town rights in 1577. It was a private town of the powerful magnate families of Leszczyński and Radziwiłł. The churches of Saint Michael Archangel and of the Intercession were established by Michał Kazimierz Radziwiłł and Karol Radziwiłł, respectively.

In the late 19th century, it had several tanneries, a brewery, a distillery, a mill, a windmill, and a brickyard. Two annual fairs were held in Sławatycze.

Following the German-Soviet invasion of Poland, which started World War II in September 1939, the settlement was occupied by Germany until 1944.

=== Jews in Sławatycze ===
Jews lived in Sławatycze as early as 1623 and by 1700 they constituted 56% of its population.

Before the Holocaust, the local Jewish population numbered around 1,300 individuals. In June 1942, the Germans gathered all Jewish citizens in the market square and during the next three days murdered them all. Their bodies were laid in a 100 meter long mass grave in the Jewish cemetery in Sławatycze.

==== Jewish cemetery in Sławatycze ====
THe cemetery is located on on ulica Polna about 100 m from the Catholic cemetery and is about 1.3, hectares in area. The cemetery is owned and partially maintained by the municipality. It was destroyed by the German army during WWII and most of the gravestones removed. A restoration project was initiated jointly by U.S.-based descendants and local officials resulting in a memorial and gate.

Information sign at cemetery

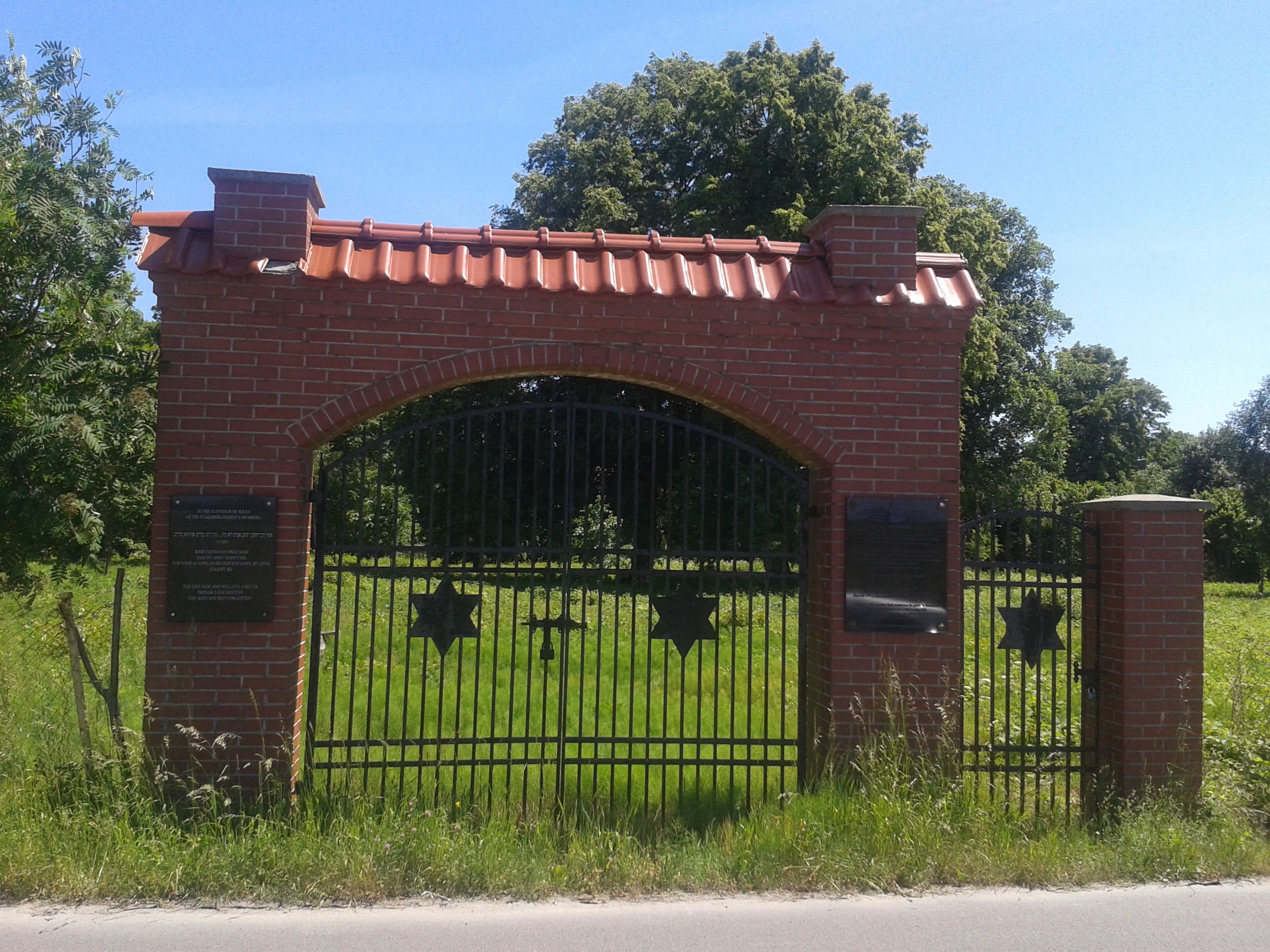
Gate of Jewish cemetery

Memorial sign at cemetery

Gravestones inthe cemetery
