= Mościce Dolne =

- Village
- Location within Poland
- Coordinates: 51°46′41″N 23°36′28″E
- Country: Poland
- Voivodeship: Lublin
- County: Biała
- Gmina: Sławatycze

Mościce Dolne [mɔɕˈt͡ɕit͡sɛ ˈdɔlnɛ] is a village in the administrative district of Gmina Sławatycze, within Biała County, Lublin Voivodeship, in eastern Poland, close to the border with Belarus.
