= Krzywowólka =

- Village
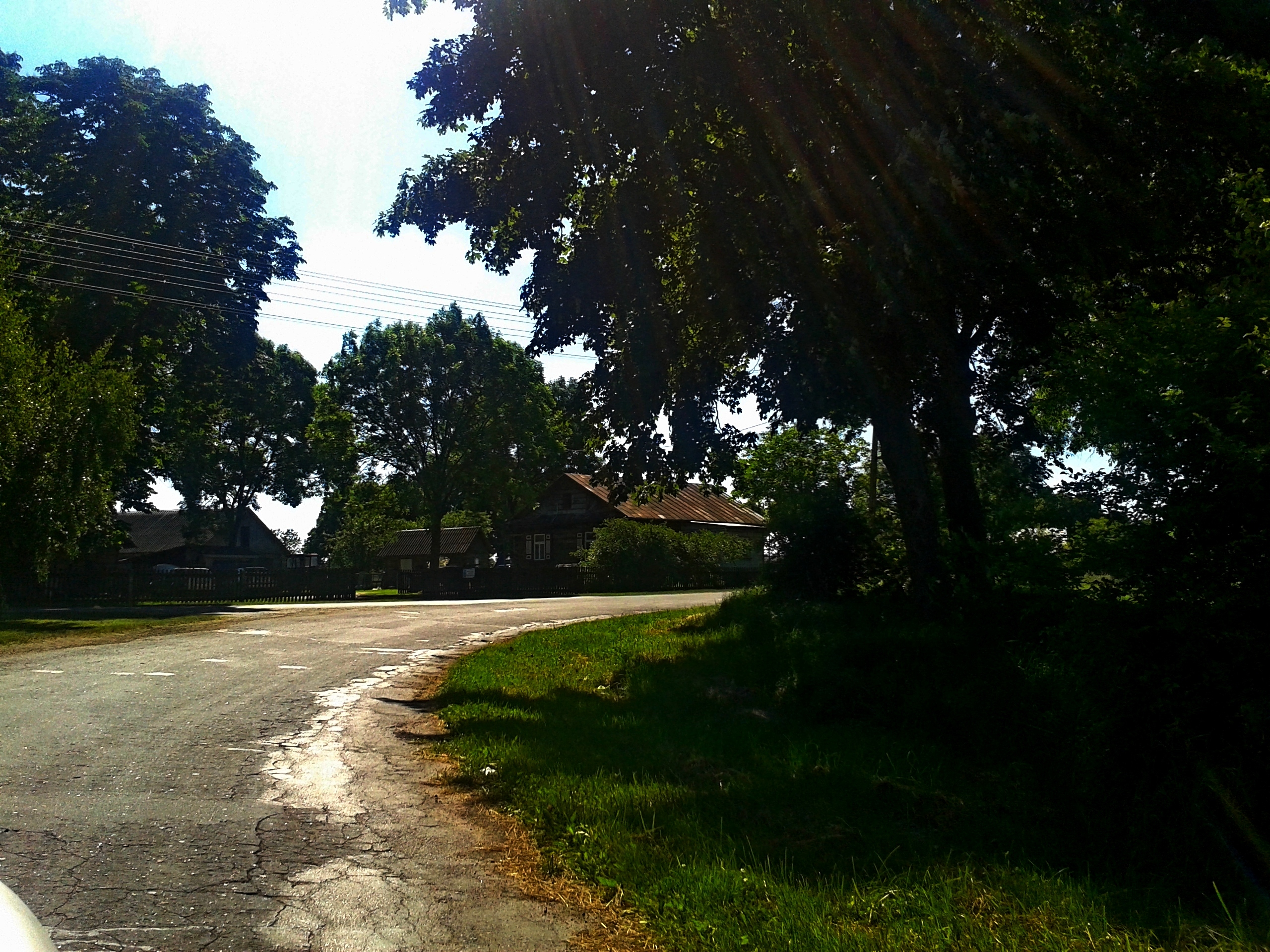
- Krzywowólka Center

- Location within Poland
- Coordinates: 51°49′N 23°31′E
- Country: Poland
- Voivodeship: Lublin
- County: Biała
- Gmina: Sławatycze

Krzywowólka [kʂɨvɔˈvulka] is a village in the administrative district of Gmina Sławatycze, within Biała County, Lublin Voivodeship, in eastern Poland, close to the border with Belarus.
