= HM Prison Norwich =

Category B/C prison in Norwich, England

Coordinates: 52.6367°N 1.3179°E

HMP Norwich
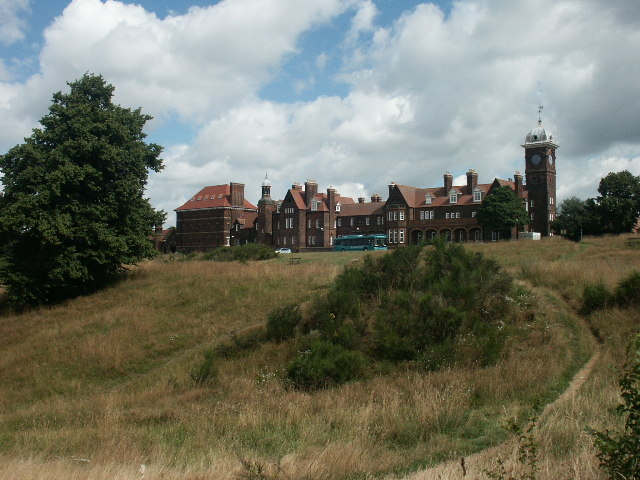
- Interactive map of HMP Norwich
- Location: Norwich, Norfolk
- Security class: Adult Males/Juveniles
- Population: 767 (February 2010)
- Opened: 1887
- Managed by: HM Prison Services
- Governor: Declan Moore
- Website: Norwich at justice.gov.uk

HM Prison Norwich is a Category B/C prison for adult and juvenile males, located on Mousehold Heath in Norwich, Norfolk and operated by His Majesty's Prison Service.

== History ==
Norwich opened as a prison in 1887 on the site of the Britannia Barracks the former home of the Royal Norfolk Regiment. The impressive barrack block which stood behind the facade served as a Category C prison for some years from the 1970s but was demolished in the 1980s and replaced by a modern Category B prison block. The Victorian prison which stands at the end of Knox Road behind the old Barracks site was built in the mid-19th century as part of the reformation of the penal system brought about by reformers, including Elizabeth Fry.

The prison has had a variety of roles over the years, but today acts as a prison for Category B & C inmates. In January 2003, a report from His Majesty's Chief Inspector of Prisons criticised Norwich Prison for factors including poor cleanliness and the failure of its anti-drug and anti-bullying programmes. The report also criticised the lack of work and education opportunities.

In November 2004, the Prison Reform Trust criticised the prison for overcrowding, stating that nearly half of all single cells were holding two prisoners, and inmates were spending too much time locked up in their cells.

At around this time Norwich became the only prison in England and Wales to have a unit exclusively for elderly males, mainly serving life sentences.

== The prison today ==
Education provision for inmates at Norwich Prison is mainly centred on basic and key skills. Other courses offered include ESOL, Food Hygiene, First Aid, Health and Safety, NVQ Catering, Art and Craft and pre-release work programmes. Workshops offer printing, textiles, contract packing services and gardens. Other facilities include a gym and a multi-faith chaplaincy.

There is also a Prison Visitor Centre which is operated by the Ormiston Children and Families Trust.

On 4 May 2016, ITV broadcast Her Majesty's Prison: Norwich. The documentary records the daily life of the inmates and their families.

== Notable former inmates ==
- Reggie Kray
- Anthony Sawoniuk
- Ronnie Biggs
- Donald Neilson
