= American Translators Association =

American professional association

- Abbreviation: ATA
- Formation: 1959
- Legal status: Association
- Headquarters: Alexandria, Virginia, United States
- Region served: International
- Members: translators, interpreters, educators, educational institutions, language services companies
- President of the Board of Directors: Andy Benzo
- Affiliations: International Federation of Translators
- Website: ATA

The American Translators Association (ATA) is the largest professional association of translators and interpreters in the United States with nearly 8,500 members in more than 100 countries.

Founded in 1959, membership is open to anyone with an interest in translation and interpretation as a profession or as a scholarly pursuit. Members include translators, interpreters, educators, project managers, web and software developers, language services companies, hospitals, universities, and government agencies.

ATA offers certification examinations for its members in some language combinations and is affiliated with the International Federation of Translators (FIT). The association is headquartered in Alexandria, Virginia.

The ATA represents both "labor" and "management"—that is, both the independent contractors who produce translation and interpreting services and the agencies who purchase them. The ATA does not provide union-type benefits, such as collective bargaining or health insurance, to its freelance members.

== Professional development ==
ATA's primary goals are to foster and support the professional development of translators and interpreters and to promote the translation and interpretation as professions. The Association offers a variety of programs and services in support of these goals, including webinars and one-day workshops throughout the year and an ATA Annual Conference every fall—all of which feature translating and interpreting education in diverse specialties and languages.

== Certification ==
The ATA currently offers certification exams in the following language pairs:

Into English from Arabic, Chinese, Croatian, Danish, Dutch, French, German, Italian, Japanese, Polish, Portuguese, Russian, Spanish, Swedish, and Ukrainian.

From English into Arabic, Chinese, Croatian, Dutch, Finnish, French, German, Hungarian, Italian, Japanese, Polish, Portuguese, Romanian, Russian, Spanish, Swedish, and Ukrainian.

After passing the ATA certification examination, translators are required to complete a certain number of "continuing education" points in order to retain their certification.

== Advocacy ==
ATA is a member of the Joint National Committee for Languages, a nonprofit education policy association that works to raise grassroots awareness of the importance of languages to national security, economic growth, and social justice. ATA has also advocated for translators and interpreters on specific issues affecting the translation and interpreting professions. See ATA Statement Opposing Discontinuing Immigration Interpreting Services, ATA Opposes Lower Interpreter Exam Scores in Texas, and ATA Position Statement Regarding California Assembly Bill 5 and Request for Exemption.

== International Translation Day ==
Since 2018, ATA has celebrated International Translation Day (September 30) by publishing a series of social media posts intended to educate the public about the role of professional translators and interpreters. ATA's 2018 ITD celebration centered on six infographics highlighting "need to know" facts about translation and interpreting services.

== Governance ==
ATA is governed by its Bylaws, and has a President, a President-Elect, a Secretary, a Treasurer, and a nine-member Board of Directors.

=== Current officers ===
- Geoff Koby, President
- Andy Benzo, President-Elect
- Eve Bodeux, Secretary
- Robin Bonthrone, Treasurer

=== Past presidents ===
- 1960–1963 Alexander Gode
- 1963–1965 Kurt Gingold
- 1965–1967 Henry Fischbach
- 1967–1969 Boris Anzlowar
- 1969–1970 Daniel Peter Moynihan (Resigned in June 1970)
- 1970–1971 William I. Bertsche (Completed Moynihan's term)
- 1971–1973 Thomas Wilds
- 1973–1975 William I. Bertsche
- 1975–1977 Roy Tinsley
- 1977–1979 Josephine Thornton
- 1979–1981 Thomas R. Bauman
- 1981–1983 Benjamin Teague
- 1983–1985 Virginia Eva Berry
- 1985–1987 Patricia E. Newman
- 1987–1989 Karl Kummer
- 1989–1991 Deanna L. Hammond
- 1991–1993 Leslie Wilson
- 1993–1995 Edith F. Losa
- 1995–1997 Peter W. Krawutschke
- 1997–1999 Muriel M. Jérôme-O'Keeffe
- 1999–2001 Ann G. Macfarlane
- 2001–2003 Thomas L. West III
- 2003–2005 Scott Brennan
- 2005–2007 Marian S. Greenfield
- 2007–2009 Jiri Stejskal
- 2009–2011 Nicholas Hartmann
- 2011–2013 Dorothee Racette
- 2013–2015 Caitilin Walsh
- 2015–2017 David Rumsey
- 2017–2019 Corinne L. McKay
- 2019–2021 Ted Wozniak
- 2021–2023 Madalena Sánchez Zampaulo
- 2023–2025 Veronika Demichelis

== Publications ==
- The ATA Chronicle is a monthly publication available 'online' and in hard-copy format. The publication includes articles on various translation- and interpreting-related issues combined with regular features.
- ATA Newsbriefs is an e-newsletter distributed to members twice a month. The publication features national and international news about translation and interpreting.
- ATA Translation and Interpreting Compensation Survey is an industry-wide survey providing a comprehensive picture of the market for T&I services. The full report is free to ATA members. An Executive Summary is available at no cost to non-members.
- The ATA Compass is a free e-publication for buyers of translation and interpreting services.
- Translation: Getting it Right
- Interpreting: Getting it Right
- ATA Scholarly Monograph Series—Published annually by John Benjamins.

== Awards ==
The ATA presents the following annual and biennial awards "to encourage, reward, and publicize outstanding work": Awards tha the ATA sponsors include the Advocacy Award, Alexander Gode Medal, Dynamo Award, Impact Award, Innovation Award, Lewis Galantière Award, Mentoring Award, Rising Star Award, Student Translation Award, and Ungar German Translation Award.

=== Lewis Galantière Award ===
The ATA bestows the Lewis Galantière Award even-numbered years for a book-length translation into English, from a language other than German. Galantière was founding member of the association.

Award Recipients:

- 1984: William Weaver
- 1986: Hildegard Hannum; Hunter Hannum
- 1988: Patrick Creagh
- 1990: Edward K. Kaplan
- 1992: Ruth Harwood Cline
- 1994: Tiina Nunnally
- 1996: William Rodarmor
- 1998: Rose-Myriam Rejouis; Val Vinokurov
- 2000: Peter Meineck
- 2002: Willard Wood
- 2004: Roger Greenwald
- 2006: Geoffrey Brock
- 2008: Norman R. Shapiro
- 2010: Margaret Sayers Peden
- 2012: Arthur Goldhammer
- 2014: Juliet Winters Carpenter
- 2016: Katrina Dodson
- 2018: Sam Taylor
- 2020: Michael Meigs
- 2022: Natasha Wimmer

=== Ungar German Translation Award ===
The Ungar German Translation Award is given in odd-numbered years, for a book-length translation from German into English.

== Structure ==
ATA divisions provide members with common interests a way to network and receive career updates. The divisions offer newsletters, online forums, seminars, conference presentations, and networking sessions. ATA offers 22 special interest groups or divisions, based on language or subject-area specialty. Any member of the ATA can belong to any division(s).

- Arabic Language Division
- Audiovisual Division
- Chinese Language Division
- Dutch Language Division
- Educators Division
- French Language Division
- German Language Division
- Government Division
- Interpreters Division
- Italian Language Division
- Japanese Language Division
- Korean Language Division
- Language Technology Division
- Law Division
- Literary Division
- Medical Division
- Nordic Division
- Portuguese Language Division
- Science and Technology Division
- Slavic Languages Division
- Spanish Language Division
- Translation Company Division

== ATA chapters ==
ATA chapters and affiliates provide regional information, marketing, networking, and support services to local translators and interpreters.

- Association of Translators and Interpreters of Florida (ATIF)
- Atlanta Association of Interpreters and Translators (AAIT)
- Carolina Association of Interpreters and Translators (CATI)
- Colorado Translators Association (CTA)
- Delaware Valley Translators Association (DVTA)
- Michigan Translators/Interpreters Network (MiTiN)
- Mid-America Chapter of ATA (MICATA)
- Midwest Association of Translators and Interpreters (MATI)
- National Capital Area Chapter of the ATA (NCATA)
- New York Circle of Translators (NYCT)
- Northeast Ohio Translators Association (NOTA)
- Northern California Translators Association (NCTA)
- Northwest Translators and Interpreters Society (NOTIS)
- Upper Midwest Translators and Interpreters Association (UMTIA)

== Affiliated groups ==
- Association of Translators and Interpreters in the San Diego Area (ATISDA)
- Austin Area Translators and Interpreters Association (AATIA)
- El Paso Interpreters and Translators Association (EPITA)
- Houston Interpreters and Translators Association (HITA)
- Iowa Interpreters and Translators Association (IITA)
- Nebraska Association of Translators and Interpreters (NATI)
- Nevada Interpreters and Translators Association (NITA)
- New Mexico Translators and Interpreters Association (NMTIA)
- Oregon Society of Translators and Interpreters (OSTI)
- Tennessee Association of Professional Interpreters and Translators (TAPIT)
- Utah Translators and Interpreters Association (UTIA)

== See also ==
- List of translators and interpreters associations
