= Sławatycze-Kolonia =

- Village
- Location within Poland
- Coordinates: 51°46′38″N 23°30′42″E
- Country: Poland
- Voivodeship: Lublin
- County: Biała
- Gmina: Sławatycze

Sławatycze-Kolonia [swavaˈtɨt͡ʂɛ kɔˈlɔɲa] is a village in the administrative district of Gmina Sławatycze, within Biała County, Lublin Voivodeship, in eastern Poland, close to the border with Belarus.
