= Finer =

Finer is an occupational surname meaning the occupation of the refiner and polisher of precious metals, cf. "Feiner". It may refer to:

- Hagar Finer, Israeli boxer
- Herman Finer (1898–1969), British administrative-scholar
- Jem Finer musician/composer
- Sir Morris Finer, lawyer
- Leslie Finer, journalist
- Samuel Finer (1915–93), historian of government
- Sarah Dawn Finer, singer, songwriter, and actress
- Stephen Finer, artist
