= Uppermost =

French music producer and DJ

- Uppermost in 2018

Background information
- Also known as: Uppermost, Downed, Alonely
- Born: Behdad Nejatbakhshe; February 19, 1989 (age 36)
- Origin: Paris, France
- Genres: Electro house, electroclash, progressive house, experimental, French house
- Occupations: DJ, producer
- Years active: 2008–present
- Labels: Uppwind Records, Bazooka Records, Zimbalam

Behdad Nejatbakhshe (born February 19, 1989), better known by his stage name Uppermost, is a French electronic music producer and DJ based in Paris.

== Career ==
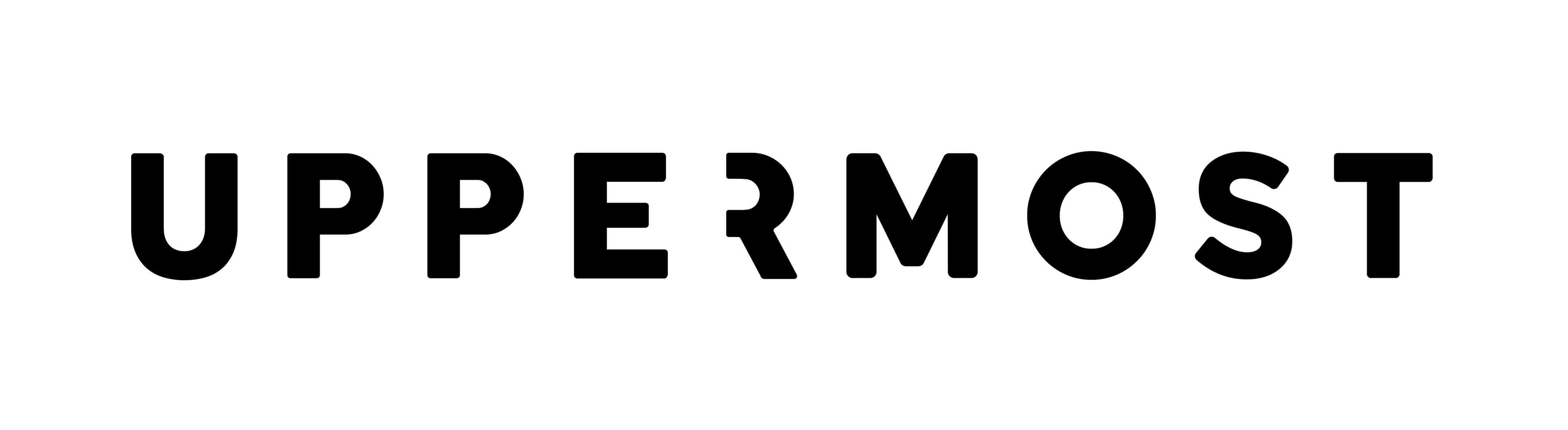
Uppermost's wordmark

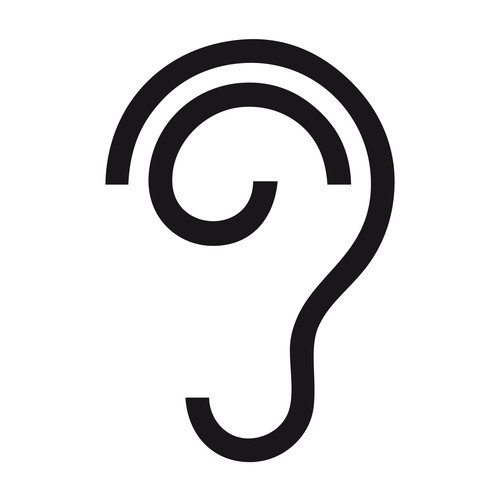
Uppermost's logo

Uppermost started producing music using FL Studio at the age of 17. His music has been released by Sony BMG, Ministry of Sound, BugEyed Records, Starlight Records, and his own label, Uppwind. His song "Equivocal" reached 3rd place in the Beatport electro-house chart in 2009 and in 2011 his Biscuit Factory EP ranked 1st on the JunoDownload electro-house chart. Uppermost has remixed Daft Punk, deadmau5, Burial, Crystal Castles, Johnathan Coulton, Syl Johnson, Congorock, Gregor Tresher, Cyberpunkers, OniMe, Jesus Luz, Spencer & Hill and Felguk. He has been playlisted by artists such as Tiësto, Armin van Buuren and Steve Angello and remixed by the popular Swedish dance duo Dada Life. In 2010, Uppermost released 41 tracks for free on his MySpace page under the aliases Uppermost, Alonely and Downed. Uppermost is currently working to promote his record label, Uppwind. His goal is to "...create a network where people can share art with each other; an artistic community where all talents can meet and learn from each other." Uppermost's idea to create music came from "an urge to express what I (Uppermost) felt at the time, some kind of nostalgia, music seemed to be the only language to translate this emotion."

On 19 September 2011, Uppermost released his debut album, Action, on his own label, Uppwind. It was made available for purchase on Beatport and Amazon on 28 November. On 19 December 2011, he released his second album, Polis, for free on his Uppwind blog, just two months after the release of Action. Uppermost began performing at live events in early 2012, starting with his gig at Alte Kaserne in Zurich. He made his first French radio interview on a student's radio named CommonWave on 21 January 2012 with Steige and Zach Mayer.

On 15 September 2023, marking his third free-to-download LP releases to date since Polis and Control, Uppermost released his 12th album, titled P2P. All tracks are titled in all caps, with their initialisms deliberately referencing computer science terminologies (HDMI, VOIP, SSH, P2P...). Uploaded on Google Drive, the release contains, alongside the 16 tracks in .wav format, a .zip password-encrypted archive titled "EXTENDED" featuring 7 additional tracks, and a readme.txt asking listeners to "find some hints on (his) discord server".

On 3 November 2023, P2P EXTENDED was released, including the 7 previously unreleased tracks.

== Influences ==
He cites Burial and Daft Punk as some of his greatest influences.

== Discography ==
=== Studio albums ===
Year	Album details
2011	Action: Released: 19 September 2011 (CD), 28 November 2011 (Download); Label: Uppwind/Zimbalam; Formats: CD, digital download
2011	Polis: Released: 19 December 2011; Label: Uppwind; Formats: Free digital download
2012	One: Released: 10 September 2012; Label: Uppwind; Formats: CD, digital download
2012	Control: Released: 17 December 2012; Label: Uppwind; Formats: Free digital download
2013	Revolution: Released: 10 June 2013; Label: Uppwind; Formats: CD, digital download
2014	Evolution: Released: 14 April 2014; Label: Uppwind; Formats: CD, digital download
2017	Origins (2011-2016): Released: 10 February 2017; Label: Uppwind; Format: LP, CD, digital download
2018	Perseverance: Released: 23 March 2018; Label: Uppwind; Format: LP, CD, digital download
2018	Given by Nature: Released: 7 September 2018; Label: Uppwind; Format: LP, CD, digital download
2021	Painted Stories: Released: 12 February 2021; Label: Uppwind; Formats: LP, CD, digital download
2021	Digital Realism: Released: 26 December 2021; Label: Uppwind; Formats: CD, digital download
2023	P2P: Released: 15 September 2023; Label: Uppwind; Formats: LP, CD, free digital download
2023	P2P EXTENDED: Released: 3 November 2023; Label: Uppwind; Formats: LP, CD, free digital download

=== Compilation albums ===
Year	Album details
2019	Uppwind on Air, Vol.1: Released: 8 March 2019; Formats: CD, digital download

=== Extended plays ===
- Daily Clouds EP (2008)
- Funk EP (2008)
- Uncontrollable EP (with Yoann Feynman) (2008)
- Cake Shop EP (2009)
- Off Stage EP (2009)
- Punch EP (2009)
- Mainstreaminization EP (2010)
- Biscuit Factory EP (2011)
- A Fallen Soul (2011)
- Method of Noise EP (2011)
- System32 EP (2011)
- Underground Life EP (2011)
- Life Is a Fight (2012)
- Hidden Poetry (2013)
- New Moon (2015)
- Impact (2016)
- Origins (2011 – 2016) (The Remixes) (2017)
- Pure (with Juani) (2019)
- Night Walk (2019)
- Overnight (2020)

=== Singles ===
Title	Year	Album	Additional Notes
"We Rock"	2009	Non-album single	None
"Equivocal"	2009	Non-album single	None
"So the Answer Is"	2009	Non-album single	None
"Mirage"	2009	Non-album single	None
"Somebody" (vs. Antillas)	2009	Non-album single	None
"Give It Some Punch"	2009	Non-album single	None
"Sound Box"	2009	Non-album single	None
"Cake Shop Is Dope"	2009	Non-album single	None
"Hit"	2009	Non-album single	None
"Clipped"	2010	Non-album single	None
"Rox Sox"	2010	Non-album single	None
"Technical Lies"	2010	Non-album single	None
"Take a Blow"	2010	Non-album single	None
"Funky"	2010	Non-album single	None
"Life Is a Fight"	2012	Non-album single	None
"Hidden Poetry"	2013	Non-album single	None
"Disco Kids"	2015	New Moon EP	None
"Hold Me Up" (featuring Vita Schmidt)	2016	Impact EP	None
"Watch You Blaze" (featuring Dutch Party)	2016	Impact EP	None
"Impact"	2016	Impact EP	None
"Hope"	2016	Origins (2011-2016)	None
"Stay in Love" (featuring Ofelia)	2016	Origins (2011-2016)	None
"Dance"	2016	One	None
"Constellation"	2016	Origins (2011-2016)	None
"Emotion"	2017	Origins (2011-2016)	None
"Alive"	2017	Origins (2011-2016)	None
"Beautiful Light"	2017	Origins (2011-2016)	Previously featured in Control (2012)
"Retro Digital"	2017	Non-album single	None
"Make a Change"	2017	Perseverance	None
"Step by Step" (featuring Sora)	2017	Perseverance	None
"Slide" (featuring Yudimah)	2018	Perseverance	None
"Atoms" (featuring Birsen)	2018	Perseverance	None
"Better Days Ahead"	2018	Perseverance	None
"Perseverance" (featuring Harry Pane)	2018	Perseverance	None
"Given by Nature"	2018	Given by Nature	None
"Starslide"	2018	Given by Nature	None
"Echoes of Mystery"	2018	Given by Nature	None
"Open Hearts"	2019	Non-album single	None
"Days and Nights" (featuring Jack Lena)	2019	Non-album single	None
"Overcome"	2019	Non-album single	None
"Forever Present"	2019	Non-album single	None
"Pure" (with Juani)	2019	Non-album single	None
"23rd Street"	2019	Non-album single	Rework of "23rd Street", a previously unreleased track
"True"	2019	Non-album single	Rework of "True", previously featured in Control (2012)
"Inner Peace"	2019	Non-album single	None
"Selfless"	2019	Non-album single	None
"Every Human Is an Artist"	2019	Non-album single	None
"Night Walk"	2019	Non-album single	Rework of "Night Walk", released as a single in 2014
"Fire Starter"	2020	Non-album single	None
"Creative Infinity"	2020	Non-album single	None
"When the Birds Start Singing"	2020	Non-album single	None
"United in Hearts"	2020	Painted Stories	None
"Fireflies"	2020	Painted Stories	None
"Iris" (with Fuji)	2020	Non-album single	None
"The City 2"	2020	Painted Stories	None
"They Call Us Dreamers"	2020	Painted Stories	None
"Shatter"	2020	Painted Stories	Rework of "Shatter", a previously unreleased track
"Willpower"	2020	Painted Stories	Rework of "Willpower", a previously unreleased track
"Everlasting"	2020	Painted Stories	None
"Endure"	2020	Painted Stories	None
"Don't Forget the Sun"	2020	Painted Stories	Rework of "Don't Forget the Sun", released as a single in 2013
"After Hours"	2020	Painted Stories	None
"Deep Space" (with Fuji)	2020	Non-album single	None
"Missing Link"	2020	Painted Stories	None
"Get Warm"	2020	Painted Stories	None
"Overnight"	2020	Painted Stories	Rework of "Overnight", released as a single in 2012
"Discover Life"	2021	Painted Stories	Rework of "Discover Life", released as a single in 2013
"Warm Winter" (with OBu)	2021	Digital Realism	None
"Ascent" (with OBu)	2021	Digital Realism	None
"Cristal" (with Fuji)	2021	Digital Realism	None
"1000" (with Fuji)	2021	Digital Realism	None
"Emerald" (with Fuji)	2021	Digital Realism	None
"Raw Jewels" (with Fuji)	2021	Digital Realism	None
"Sapphire" (with Fuji)	2021	Digital Realism	None
"ODC" (with Medium Douce)	2021	Digital Realism	None
"Fast Forward"	2021	Digital Realism	None
"Sanctuary Tree" (with Ambyion)	2021	Digital Realism	None
"Morning Dew"	2021	Digital Realism	None
"Rainy Nights Magic"	2021	Digital Realism	None
"Now or Never"	2021	Digital Realism	None
"New Dawn"	2021	Digital Realism	None
"Someday"	2021	Digital Realism	None
"Beginnings"	2021	Digital Realism	None
"Example" (with No Mana)	2021	Electromag (compilation)	None
"LAE" (with FA)	2021	Digital Realism	None
"Supernova"	2021	Digital Realism	None
"Journey"	2021	Digital Realism	None
"Heaven"	2021	Digital Realism	None
"Upflow"	2021	Digital Realism	None
"Illusion"	2021	Digital Realism	None
"Glider" (with Fuji and OBu)	2021	Digital Realism	None
"BSO" (with Fuji and OBu)	2021	Digital Realism	None
"Feeling" (with Mesita)	2021	Digital Realism	None

=== Samples ===
- 2012: "Flow" (samples Daft Punk – "Digital Love" / Justice – "D.A.N.C.E." / Daft Punk – "Something About Us" / Rockwell ft. Michael Jackson – "Somebody's Watching Me" / Nightcrawlers – "Push the Feeling On (The Dub of Doom)")
- 2012: "Passion" (samples Linkin Park – "Shadow of the Day" / Apparat – "Escape" / Apparat – "Ash/Black Veil")
- 2012: "True" (samples Burial – "Archangel")
- 2012: "Independent" (samples Ben Howard – "Keep Your Head Up")
- 2012: "Beautiful Light" (samples Paul McCartney & Michael Jackson – "Say Say Say" / Birdy – "People Help the People" / Daft Punk – "Face to Face" / Muse – "Madness")
- 2013: "Discover Life" (samples Gabrielle Aplin – "The Power of Love")

=== Remixes ===
- 2007: Kevin Tandarsen – "Moria"
- 2008: Cyberpunkers – "Is Alternative"
- 2008: Missy Jay – "Nobody's Perfect"
- 2009: Disco Bitch – "C'est Beau La Bourgeoisie (Kevin Tandarsen & Uppermost Remix)"
- 2009: Greenpower featuring Ely Morelli – "What Is Love?"
- 2009: Nina Martine – "Kick It"
- 2009: OniMe – "Close Your Eyes"
- 2010: Swen Weber & Jewelz – "Memory"
- 2010: Spencer & Hill – "303"
- 2010: Sebastien Szade & Eddine.B – "Pyramid of Kheops"
- 2010: deadmau5 – "Complications" [unreleased]
- 2010: Jesus Luz – "Around the World"
- 2010: deadmau5 – "Jaded"
- 2010: Squeeeze! – "Doop"
- 2010: Felguk – "Side by Side"
- 2010: Daft Punk – "Technologic"
- 2010: Rene Rodrigezz featuring Sivana Reese – "More & More"
- 2010: Syl Johnson – "I'm Talking About Freedom"
- 2010: Jonathan Coulton – "Still Alive"
- 2010: Burial – "Archangel"
- 2010: Fatboy Slim – "Star 69" [unreleased]
- 2011: OniMe – "Elsewhere"
- 2011: Crystal Castles – "Vietnam"
- 2011: Keane – "He Used To Be a Lovely Boy"
- 2011: Burial – "Forgive" & "Street Halo"
- 2011: Dada Life – "Happy Violence"
- 2012: Sebastien Benett – "Slap"
- 2012: Lemaitre – "Appreciate"
- 2013: Futurecop! featuring Cavaliers of Fun – "Atlantis 1997"
- 2013: Camo & Krooked featuring Ian Shaw – "Move Around"
- 2014: Daft Punk – "Face to Face"
- 2014: Röyksopp – "Poor Leno"
- 2015: Phoenix – "Bourgeois"
- 2015: Adele – "Hello"
- 2015: Modjo – "Lady"
- 2015: Christine and The Queens – "Saint Claude"
- 2016: Olga Kouklaki – "Oxytocin"
- 2016: Rihanna – "Work"
- 2016: Halsey – "Haunting"
- 2017: Flyboy featuring Radiochaser – "Run Away with Me"
- 2017: Xavier Boyer – "Stockholm Syndrome"
- 2018: SKYGGE feat. The Pirouettes – "One Note Samba"
- 2018: SACRE – "Forever Young"
- 2019: Uppermost – "Pure" [with Popiche]
- 2019: The Midnight – "Shadows"
- 2020: Midnight Kids featuring Lisa Goe – "Break Away"
- 2020: Gareth Emery – "Way to You"
- 2021: Alex Bone feat. Nile Rodgers - "In Dream"
