= Terebiski =

- Village
- Location within Poland
- Coordinates: 51°48′N 23°36′E
- Country: Poland
- Voivodeship: Lublin
- County: Biała
- Gmina: Sławatycze

Population
  - Total: 14

Terebiski [tɛrɛˈbʲiskʲi] is a village in the administrative district of Gmina Sławatycze, within Biała County, Lublin Voivodeship, in eastern Poland, close to the border with Belarus.
