= Feynman (disambiguation) =

Richard Feynman (1918–1988) was a physicist.

Feynman may also refer to:

- 7495 Feynman, asteroid
- Foresight Institute Feynman Prize in Nanotechnology

== Other people with the surname ==
- Joan Feynman (1927–2020), astrophysicist, sister of Richard
- Yoann Feynman (born 1990), French musician

== See also ==
- Feynmanium
- Feinman, a surname
- Fineman, a surname
