= Krzywowólka-Kolonia =

- Village
- Location within Poland
- Coordinates: 51°49′13″N 23°30′44″E
- Country: Poland
- Voivodeship: Lublin
- County: Biała
- Gmina: Sławatycze

Krzywowólka-Kolonia [kʂɨvɔˈvulka kɔˈlɔɲa] is a village in the administrative district of Gmina Sławatycze, within Biała County, Lublin Voivodeship, in eastern Poland, close to the border with Belarus.
