= Finegold =

Finegold may refer to:

- Finegold, California, former name of Fine Gold, California, community in Madera County
- Finegold Alexander Architects, American architecture firm
- Finegold (surname), a surname
