= William I. Bertsche =

American translator

William I. Bertsche (1918–1998) was an American commercial translator. A speaker of English and German, he could sight-read Afrikaans, Danish, Dutch, French, Finnish, Icelandic, Italian, Norwegian, Portuguese, Romanian, Spanish and Swedish.

Bertsche was the son of Carl Bertsche and Herta Woelfler. In 1908 his mother had founded the Lawyers' and Merchants' Translation Bureau at 11 Broadway, New York (now a subsidiary of RWS Holdings). His father was a charter member of the American Translators Association (ATA). William obtained degrees in English and Chemical Engineering from Columbia University and in Law from Fordham (1943), being called to the New York bar. In 1944 and 1945 he served in the U.S. Counter-Intelligence Corps as a German translator and interpreter.

After the end of World War II, Bertsche joined the family business, and he became owner when his parents retired in 1966. He continued to run the bureau, one of the most prestigious translation agencies in the United States, until 1994.

Besides working as a technical translator and legal translator, Bertsche was also involved in translator training and professionalization. He taught German translation at New York University, and twice held the Presidency of the ATA, also serving as chair of its Ethics Committee, as Treasurer (computerizing the association's accounting system), and as Accreditation Chair.

In 1986 he was awarded the Alexander Gode medal for outstanding service to the translation and interpreting professions.

Bertsche lived in Croton-on-Hudson, and died of cancer at Calvary Hospital in the Bronx on July 11, 1998. His obituary in The New York Times said he "had been one of the nation's leading document translators for more than half a century".
