= Parośla-Pniski =

- Village
- Location within Poland
- Coordinates: 51°48′35″N 23°36′37″E
- Country: Poland
- Voivodeship: Lublin
- County: Biała
- Gmina: Sławatycze

Population
  - Total: 130

Parośla-Pniski [paˈrɔɕla] is a village in the administrative district of Gmina Sławatycze, within Biała County, Lublin Voivodeship, in eastern Poland, close to the border with Belarus.
