= Gmina Sławatycze =

Gmina Sławatycze Sławatycze Commune
- Gmina
- Flag Coat of arms
- Interactive map of Gmina Sławatycze
- Coordinates (Sławatycze): 51°45′N 23°33′E
- Country: Poland
- Voivodeship: Lublin
- County: Biała County
- Seat: Sławatycze

Area
  - Total: 71.71 km^{2} (27.69 sq mi)

Population (2014)
  - Total: 2,415
  - Density: 33.68/km^{2} (87.22/sq mi)
- Website: http://www.slawatycze-gmina.pl

Gmina Sławatycze is a rural gmina (administrative district) in Biała County, Lublin Voivodeship, in eastern Poland, on the border with Belarus. Its seat is the village of Sławatycze, which lies approximately 44 kilometres (27 mi) south-east of Biała Podlaska and 88 km (55 mi) north-east of the regional capital Lublin.

The gmina covers an area of 71.71 square kilometres (27.7 sq mi), and as of 2006 its total population is 2,616 (2,415 in 2014).

== Villages ==
Gmina Sławatycze contains the villages and settlements of Jabłeczna, Krzywowólka, Krzywowólka-Kolonia, Kuzawka-Kolonia, Liszna, Mościce Dolne, Nowosiółki, Parośla, Pniski, Sajówka, Sławatycze, Sławatycze-Kolonia, Terebiski and Zańków.

== Neighbouring gminas ==
Gmina Sławatycze is bordered by the gminas of Hanna, Kodeń and Tuczna. It also borders Belarus.
