= Aryeh Löb Feinstein =

Russian Jewish scholar

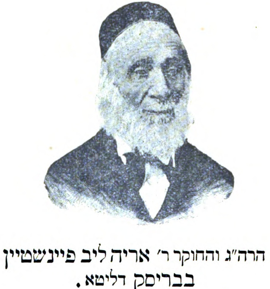
- Born: 6 December 1821; Damachev, Russian Empire
- Died: 20 January 1903 (aged 81); Damachev, Russian Empire
- Writing career
- Language: Hebrew

Aryeh Löb Feinstein (Hebrew: אריה ליב פיינשטיין; December 6, 1821 – January 20, 1903) was a Russian Jewish scholar.

== Biography ==
Aryeh Löb Feinstein was born in Damachev, Grodno Governorate, in 1821. After devoting many years to the study of the Talmud, he worked as a foreman for a firm in Brest. In his commercial dealings with Christian merchants, he acquired a knowledge of languages. He later established his own successful business, amassing substantial wealth.

Feinstein actively participated in the Jewish community's affairs, serving as its parnas for many years.

Among other works, he was the author of Elef ha-Magen (Warsaw, 1870), a commentary on the Passover Haggadah, and 'Ir Tehillah (Warsaw, 1886), a history of the Jewish community of Brest-Litovsk, co-written with Abraham Marcus Finkelstein.

== Selected publications ==
- Elef ha-Magen (in Hebrew). Warsaw. 1870.
- Feinstein, Aryeh Loeb; Finkelstein, Abraham Mordecai (1886). 'Ir Tehillah (in Hebrew). Warsaw.
- Tal-piyyot (in Hebrew). Warsaw. 1896.
