= Anthony Sawoniuk =

Belarusian Nazi collaborator (1921–2005)

- Born: Andrei Sawoniuk; 7 March 1921; Damačava, Polesie Voivodeship, Poland
- Died: 6 November 2005 (aged 84); HMP Norwich, Norwich, England
- Known for: Nazi collaborator and war criminal
- Status: Deceased
- Conviction: Murder (18 counts)
- Penalty: Life imprisonment (whole life tariff)

Anthony Sawoniuk (born Andrei Sawoniuk; Belarusian: Андрэй Саванюк, romanized: Andrej Savaniuk; 7 March 1921 – 6 November 2005) was a Belarusian Nazi collaborator from the town of Damachava in Brest Region.

After taking part in the murder of the Jewish community in his home town, Sawoniuk served in the SS until November 1944 when he defected to the Polish II Corps in the British Eighth Army. After the war, he settled in Britain, became a British citizen, and became the first (and currently the only) person to be convicted under the UK's War Crimes Act 1991, when he was found guilty in 1999 of war crimes for the murder of 18 Jews. Sawoniuk received a life sentence, and died in prison six years later.

== Early life ==
Andrei Sawoniuk was born in Domaczewo, Poland (now Damačava, Belarus), a spa town on the Bug River. At that time 90% of the town's population were ethnic Jews, with the remainder being Poles, Ukrainians, Belarusians, and German Volksdeutsche. Sawoniuk, nicknamed "Andrusha" (a Russian and Belarusian diminutive of Andrey), has been described as Belarusian, though some newspaper reports say that his mother was Polish. Sawoniuk never knew the identity of his father, although townspeople believed him to be Josef Jakubiak, the town's Jewish schoolmaster, because his mother Pelagia had been working as a cleaner at Jakubiak's school and home during the months when Sawoniuk was conceived. Andrei used the patronymic "Andreyevich", which does not appear in the Polish language, as Poles do not use patronyms. His mother's former husband also had the name Andrei.

The family were poor: his mother washed clothes for money while Sawoniuk and his half-brother collected firewood to sell. Sawoniuk also worked as a sabbath goy: a gentile employed by Orthodox Jews to carry out Sabbath tasks that were forbidden to them, such as lighting fires or chopping wood. He learnt basic Yiddish from his employers.

== Actions during and after World War II ==
During World War II, Sawoniuk was a member of the local Nazi-supported Belarusian Auxiliary Police and rose to the rank of Commandant. While serving in the police he participated in the murder of Jews.

In 1944, Sawoniuk fled westwards when the Red Army advanced towards Domaczewo and in July 1944 joined the German armed forces, serving in the 30th Waffen Grenadier Division of the SS. He deserted from the SS in November 1944 and changed sides, using his Polish birth certificate to join the 10th Hussar Regiment of the Polish II Corps.

After the war, Sawoniuk settled in England in 1946, posing as a Polish patriot. In 1951, he wrote a letter to his half-brother, Nikolai. The KGB, who already suspected him of being a war criminal, intercepted the letter and noted that he was now living in the UK. It was not until the 1980s that the KGB started sharing such information with the UK. However, due to a misspelling of his name, it took until 1994 for authorities to realise that Sawoniuk, then working for British Rail, was one of the people on the KGB list. He was then arrested.

== Trial ==
Sawoniuk had, by that time, become a British citizen. He was tried at the Old Bailey in London in 1999 on two specimen charges of murder with regard to the murder of Jews in his German-occupied hometown during World War II. The jury found him guilty of one charge by unanimous decision and of the other by a ten to one majority. A further two charges of murder were withdrawn by the prosecution due to procedural errors with evidence. However, both of the murders of which Sawoniuk was convicted were individual elements of two group murders: in the first Sawoniuk, according to eyewitnesses, shot 15 Jews; in the second he shot three Jews.

At his trial, Sawoniuk said of his accusers "They are professional liars. They have criminal records. Some of the witnesses at the magistrates court have done 25 years, alcoholics. I was the best friend of the Jews." He also stated that "Everyone is telling lies. They have been told by the Russian KGB to say there was a ghetto. These devils came here with their lies against me." and "I have done no crime whatsoever. My conscience is clear. I killed no one. I would not dream of doing it. I am not a monster, I am an ordinary working-class poor man." He also denied having been a member of the German armed forces, stating "I have never been in the German army". In court, he accused a member of the Metropolitan Police of fabricating a Waffen-SS document which contained his details. He speculated that the Metropolitan Police had conspired against him with the help of the KGB.

He was given two life sentences, and trial judge Mr Justice Potts recommended that Sawoniuk should spend the rest of his life in prison.

He was the first and, to date, the only person in United Kingdom to be convicted under the War Crimes Act 1991. From a legal perspective, this case is unique, as it was also the first time that a British jury had travelled overseas to view the scene of a crime. In 2000, the House of Lords refused him permission to appeal.

Sawoniuk died in Norwich Prison of natural causes in 2005, aged 84.

== Bibliography ==
- The Ticket Collector from Belarus - "An Extraordinary True Story of the Holocaust and Britain's only War Crimes Trial" - by Mike Anderson & Neil Hanson - 2021 - Simon & Schuster (publishers)
