= Fineman =

Fineman is a surname. Notable people with the surname include:

- Herbert Fineman (1920–2016), American politician
- Howard Fineman (1948–2024), American journalist
- Martha Fineman (born 1943), American scholar
- Uri Fineman (born 1959), Israeli singer
- Chloe Fineman (born 1988), American actress and comedian

== See also ==
- Feynman (disambiguation)
- Rondell Rawlins, nicknamed "Fineman"
- Smith–Fineman–Myers syndrome
