= Nowosiółki, Gmina Sławatycze =

Nowosiółki
- Village
- Location within Poland
- Coordinates: 51°0′11″N 23°36′30″E
- Country: Poland
- Voivodeship: Lublin
- County: Biała
- Gmina: Sławatycze

Nowosiółki [nɔvɔˈɕuu̯kʲi] is a village in the administrative district of Gmina Sławatycze, within Biała County, Lublin Voivodeship, in eastern Poland, close to the border with Belarus.
