= Feiner =

Feiner is an occupational surname meaning the occupation of the refiner and polisher of precious metals, cf. "Finer". It may refer to:

- Irving Feiner, plaintiff in Feiner v. New York
- Leon Feiner, Polish-Jewish lawyer, political activist
- Michael Feiner, Swedish musician
- Steven K. Feiner, American computer scientist
- William Feiner, German Jesuit missionary
- Yehiel Feiner, birth name of Yehiel De-Nur, Jewish writer, Holocaust survivor
