= Avi Finegold =

Canadian rabbi

Avi Finegold is a Canadian rabbi in Montreal. In 2015, he founded the Jewish Learning Lab for adult Jewish education, and from July 2017 to 2018 served as interim rabbi of the Spanish and Portuguese Synagogue of Montreal. Finegold previously served as executive director of the Montreal Board of Rabbis.

In 2021, Finegold started a podcast with The Canadian Jewish News called Bonjour Chai, a weekly current affairs program discussing topics relevant to the Canadian Jewish community. His co-hosts are actor/writer David Sklar in Calgary and actor Ilana Zackon in Vancouver.

He is married to Rabba Rachel Kohl Finegold, of Congregation Shaar Hashomayim.
