= Murder of Ian Feinberg =

Ian Sean Feinberg (1963–1993) was an Israeli lawyer who was also the legal counsel for Office of Co-operation for Development in Gaza, a European-funded aid project which provided loans to Gazan businessmen. At age 30, he was murdered by terrorists who burst into the room while he was participating in a business meeting to discuss economic development in their Gaza offices.

== Biography ==
Feinberg was born in South Africa in 1963 and moved to Israel after completing high school. He attended the Bar Ilan University law school, where he graduated with outstanding grades. After serving in the army, he opened a law office in Tel Aviv and, among other things, provided legal representation to commercial interests in Gaza. He also served as the legal counsel for the Gaza offices of Co-operation for Development, a European-funded aid project which makes loans to businessmen.

He was survived by a widow, Ofra, three small children, parents and siblings.

== Murder ==
On Sunday afternoon on April 18, 1993 he participated in a business meeting at the Gaza offices of Co-operation for Development. Two killers, armed with a Kalashnikov assault rifle, knives and a hatchet, burst into the meeting at about 4:30pm, claiming that they had come to "murder the Jew." Local employees and others who were present pleaded with the gunmen not to attack him, but they stabbed Feinberg in the throat many times and hacked his head with a hatchet.

The killers were part of the Red Eagles, the armed wing affiliated with George Habash’s Popular Front for the Liberation of Palestine (PFLP).

His murder sent shock waves throughout Gaza and Israel. Issam Shawa, Palestinian head of a US aid agency in Gaza, said the murder was particularly shocking because the victim was 'clearly trying to help Gazans and their economy'. It broke an unwritten rule that non-partisan Israelis, such as lawyers and journalists, enjoy immunity from terrorist attacks. The Davar newspaper said that with Feinberg's murder a dream was also murdered. Ian believed that you had to help people, no matter who they were, what their religion, background or political views.

His sister, Gila Molcho said that he believed in people and that by bringing work to Gaza he would be improving their quality of life. He didn't worry about working in Gaza and never imagined that someone would attack him in the office because of his work.

== Murderers ==
- Rafat Ali Muhammad Aruqi knew Feinberg personally. He was arrested in May 1993 and given a life sentence for his role in Feinberg's murder. He was released in 2011 as part of the prisoner exchange that freed IDF soldier Gilad Shalit who was held by Hamas in Gaza for five years.
- Omar Issa Masoud was working as a guard at the European Union building where Feinberg was volunteering. He was the main murderer and wielded the hatchet. He was arrested shortly after the murder and sentenced to 90 years in prison. He was released in 2013 in a prisoner exchange connected to a four-stage prisoner release deal.
- Yusef Abed al-Al was imprisoned in 1994 as an accessory to Ian's murder for providing information to the murderers and for carrying out several grenade attacks and murdering Sami Ramadan. He was sentenced to 22 years imprisonment. He was one of twenty six prisoners released in August 2013 as part of a confidence-building measure aimed at bolstering renewed Palestinian-Israeli peace negotiations.

== Burial ==
He is buried in the Kiryat Shaul cemetery in Tel Aviv in a special section for terrorist victims.
