= Richard D. Feinman =

American medical researche (born 1940)

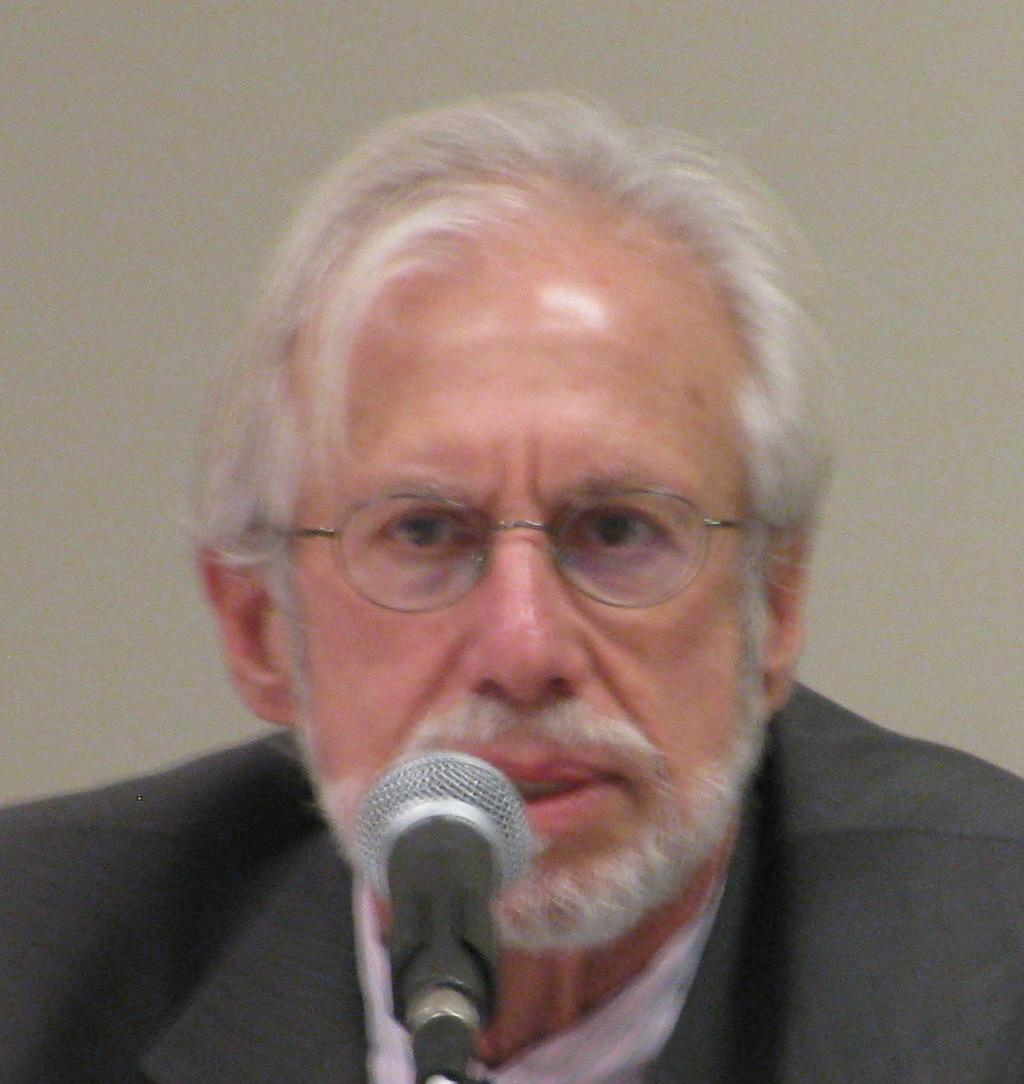
- Born: Richard D. Feinman; 1940 (age 85–86); New York, New York
- Known for: Diet composition and energy balance
- Spouse: Tana Feinman
- Children: Mimi Feinman, Jessica Feinman, Robin Feinman
- Scientific career
- Fields: Biochemistry
- Institutions: SUNY Downstate Medical Center, Brooklyn

Richard David Feinman (born 1940) is a professor of biochemistry and medical researcher at State University of New York Health Science Center at Brooklyn, better known as SUNY Downstate Medical Center, who studies nutrition and metabolism. His current area of research is the area of diet composition and energy balance.

He is a director of the Metabolism Society and a former co-Editor-in-Chief of the Open Access online medical journal, Nutrition & Metabolism.
