= Mildred Feinberg =

American artist

- Born: 1899
- Died: 1990 (aged 90–91)
- Occupation: Artist

Mildred Feinberg (June 1899 – June 1990) was an American artist known for her etchings and paintings.

== Biography ==
Born in New York City, Mildred studied at Parsons School of Design, 1917, and graduated from the School of Fine and Applied Arts at the Pratt Institute of Fine Arts in 1920.

Mildred and Minna had a design business, Twins Advertising Art Service, NYC, on Madison Avenue from 1923 to 1974.

Art exhibitions with her sister took place in The Townhouse Gallery, Woodstock, NY, in 1952 and at the Charles Barzansky Galleries, NYC, in 1957. She participated in group exhibitions at the Ward Eggleston Galleries, 1953–55, Tokyo Municipal Art Museum, 1960, Riverside Museum, NYC, 1960, Royal Academy Galleries, Edinburgh, Scotland, 1963, Royal Society of British Artists, Birmingham, England, 1964, National Academy of Design, 1963, Allied Artists International, 1961–63. Her paintings were exhibited at Lever House, NYC, 1965–68, 72, Palazzo Vecchio, Florence, Italy, 1972, Salvator Rosa Public Garden, Naples, Italy, 1972.

Her works are included in the permanent collections of the Rose Art Museum, Brandeis University, the Museum of Arts and Sciences in Norfolk, Virginia, and the Evansville, Indiana Museum of Arts and Sciences.

== Awards ==
- Lillian Cotton Memorial prize, National Association of Women Artists, 1965
- Medal of honor for painting by National Art Club, 1968
- Woman Art Award Honorable Mention, 1978, 79
- Ziuta and Joseph James Akston Foundation prize for painting, Whitney Museum, 1979
