= Rachel Kohl Finegold =

Rabba Rachel Kohl Finegold
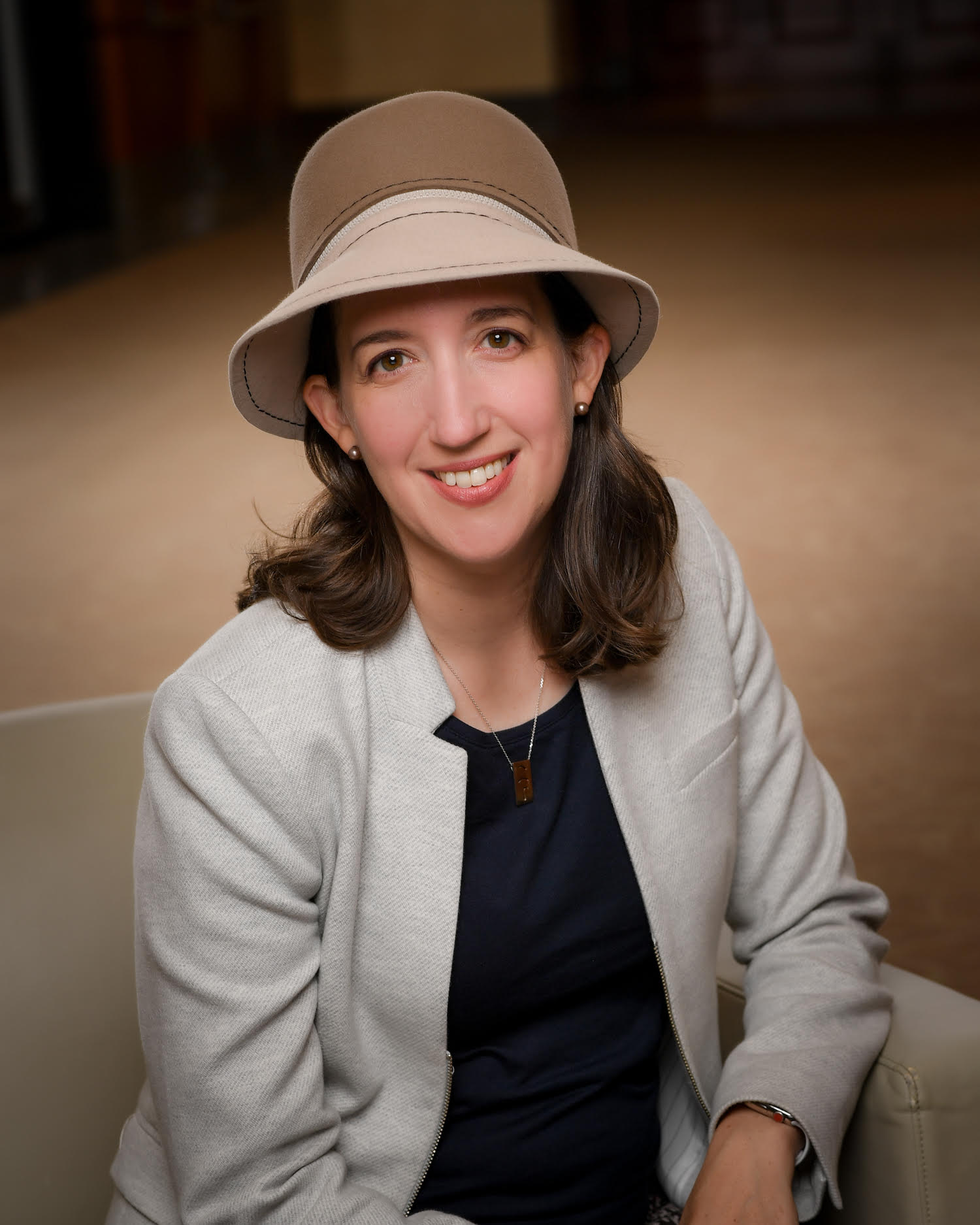

Personal life
- Born: Rachel Kohl; 1980 (age 45–46) Brooklyn, New York
- Spouse: Avi Finegold
- Education: Boston University; Yeshivat Maharat

Religious life
- Religion: Judaism
- Denomination: Orthodox Judaism

Jewish leader
- Synagogue: Moriah Congregation; Deerfield, Illinois

Rachel Kohl Finegold (born 1980) is the Rabba at the Moriah Congregation in Deerfield, Illinois. She was the first Orthodox woman to serve as synagogue clergy in Canada, serving as Associate Rabba at Congregation Shaar Haashomayim in Montreal until 2023.

== Biography ==
Kohl Finegold grew up in Brooklyn, New York, before attending Boston University, where in 2003 she earned a B.A. in Religion with a minor in Psychology. In 2007, she received a certificate from the Drisha Institute for Jewish Education in New York. She interned at the Ohev Sholom Synagogue in Washington, D.C., before spending six years as Education and Ritual Director at Anshe Sholom B'nai Israel in Chicago. In June 2013, she was one of the first three women to graduate from Yeshivat Maharat, a four-year program in The Bronx that ordains Orthodox women as spiritual leaders.

In August 2013, Kohl Finegold became the Director of Education and Spiritual Enrichment at Congregation Shaar Hashomayim in Montreal, the largest and oldest traditional Ashkenazi synagogue in Canada. In doing so, she also became the first Orthodox woman to serve as synagogue clergy in Canada. In 2019, she changed her title from Maharat to Rabba. She served as the president of the Montreal Board of Rabbis from 2019-2023, and served as Vice President of the International Rabbinic Fellowship. In 2022, Kohl Finegold created the podcast Verses, which draws links between Broadway and Torah.

In 2023, she became rabbinic leader of the Moriah Congregation in Deerfield, Illinois, where she lives with her husband Rabbi Avi Finegold and their three children.

== See also ==
- Maharat
