= Fehn =

Fehn is a surname. Notable people with this surname include:

- Chris Fehn (born 1973), American musician
- Gustav Fehn (1892–1945), German general
- Hans-Georg Fehn (1943–1999), German water polo player
- Sverre Fehn (1924–2009), Norwegian architect

== See also ==
- Fern (name)
