= Barbara Feinman Millinery =

Hattery in Manhattan, New York

Coordinates: 40°43′38.51″N 73°59′13.04″W

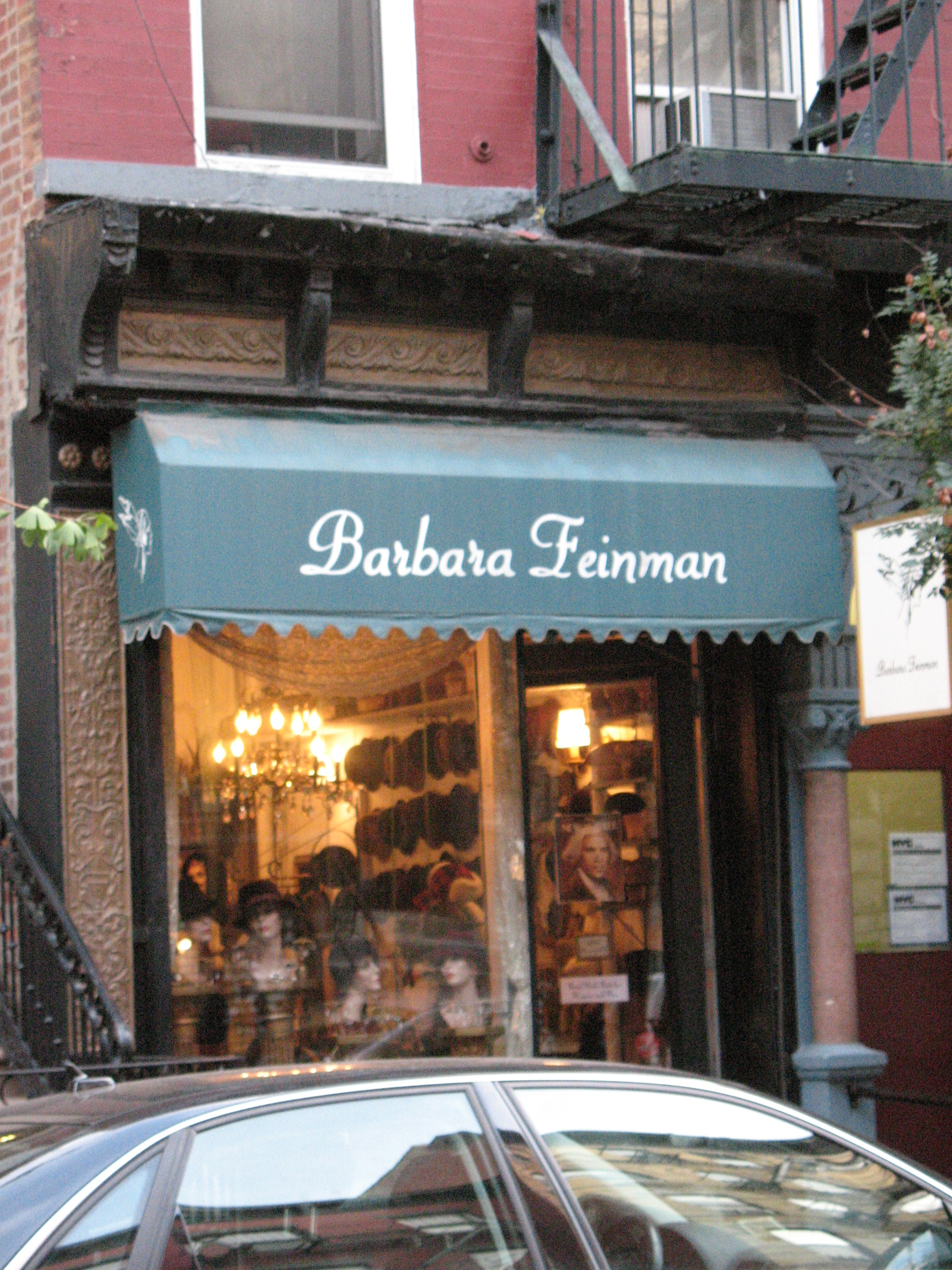

The Barbara Feinman Millinery is a custom hattery in New York City's East Village. Feinman's hats were made by two other milliners, Julia Emily Knox and Katherine Carey, using a 100-year-old sewing machine and various materials.

== History ==
Feinman studied English at Vassar College and worked 20 years in corporate jobs before taking a millinery class at the Fashion Institute of Technology and switching careers. Her work has been described as elegant and of "impeccable" workmanship with a "dash of whimsy".

Feinman sold her hat designs through retailers until opening her shop in 1998. The millinery store was a member of the nine store Designers of the East Village Association or (DEVA) group. It was located in an area that has "a history of anarchy, counterculture and edginess."

The store was unusual in having hats made on site. Feinman worked with business partner, Julia Emily Knox and milliner Katherine Carey to "hand-block and hand-craft hats from start to finish using techniques and equipment scarcely changed since the 19th century".

Styles range from fedoras to cloches and fur hats, as well as retro film noir and cocktail hats with face veils. The hats start at a price of $250. The store also stocks jewelry, and sunglasses.

Barbara Feinman Millinery was number four in New York Magazine's 1998 Christmas shopping guide "50 Great New Stores" list and included in the "New York Magazine Shops — A Guide to the Best Stores in New York" in 2000. Customers range from uptown matrons to Japanese tourists. For example, Brookelynn Starnes from the show Cloak & Dagger said she wore Barbara Feinman's Panama-style hats.

Feinman suggested trying hats on when shopping for them because "two hats can look the same, but a small difference in proportion makes a big difference when worn" and to "stay away from small hats if you have big hair" in favor of a "loosely fitting hat that that frames [the] face." Her motto was "If you want to stand out, wear a hat," and she said that "There really is no substitute for a handmade hat."

Feinman retired and sold her business to business partner, Knox.

== Today ==
The business was renamed East Village Hats and moved to 80 East 7th Street. Knox added hat-making classes and invited guest teachers from around the world.

Knox is an English milliner, trained at FIT New York. She leads a small team of milliners at East Village Hats, where they hand craft the hats on the premises, using traditional tools, methods and materials.
