= Feinblatt =

Feinblatt is a surname. Notable people with the surname include:

- John Feinblatt (fl. late 1970s–2011), an American gun control activist, lawyer, and author
- Lois Feinblatt (1922–2022), an American nurse and professor
