= Uri Fineman =

Israeli singer and composer

Uri Fineman אורי פיינמן
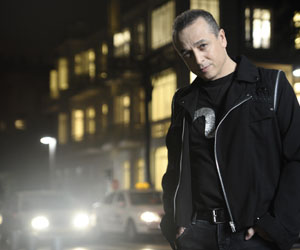
- Uri Fineman, February 2009

Background information
- Born: 1959 (age 65–66)
- Origin: Tel Aviv, Israel
- Instrument(s): Guitar, singing
- Website: uri-fineman.com

Uri Fineman (Hebrew: אורי פיינמן; born 1959) is an Israeli singer and composer who has released several album.

== Biography ==
Fineman was born in 1959 in Tel Aviv, Israel. He won first prize at a major music competition at age 11 singing Nissim Gelding's "איני יכול". He plays the guitar as well as sings. In addition to music he also practices karate. He joined the Israel Defense Forces in 1977.

In 1987, two years after beginning work on his first album, he released the first song "את אינך" to radio where it quickly became a hit. In 1990, he released his second album, מלח הארץ, with Tamir Klisky. In 1990 and 1991, he participated in the Hanukkah contest קדם אירוויזיון, singing the songs "הבה נגילה" and "האור".

In 1993, he released his third album, אהבה מחודשת which went platinum. By 1994, he had released three more albums in the אהבה מחודשת series, which also went platinum. In 1996, he released his seventh album, "ים של אהב which was written by a mix of other composers and himself. In 1995–96, he released אם רק תביני – אוסף הלהיטים הגדולים, a collection of songs from previous albums as well as two new ones. In 1997–98, he released לך בנשיקה, which contained 1960s songs in Hebrew. It went gold.

In 2002, he was given an eight month suspended jail sentence due to infringement of a Microsoft copyright. In 2009, he worked on a collaboration with several other artists on his first album in 12 years.
