= Kurt Gingold =

Kurt Gingold (1929–1997) was an Austrian-American scientific translator, and a charter member and second president of the American Translators Association.

== Life and career ==
Kurt Gingold was born in Austria in 1929. He studied at Tulane University, where he was active in the student chapter of the American Chemical Society and Hillel, graduating in 1950. He went on to do graduate work at Harvard, obtaining his doctorate in chemistry in 1954. In 1957 Gingold was a contestant on the NBC game show Twenty-One.

For thirty years he worked as a translator (senior information scientist) for American Cyanamid, going on to work as a consultant translator for Boehringer Ingelheim. He was a charter member of the American Translators Association (ATA), founded in 1959, serving as vice president 1960–63, and as president 1963–65. It was in the latter capacity that, on September 30, 1964, he gave a presentation to the Automatic Language Processing Advisory Committee of the National Academy of Sciences and the United States National Research Council, explaining the lack of correlation between cost and quality in commercial translation. In 1965 he became the second recipient of the Gode Medal for services to the profession. He was accredited by the ATA as a translator into English from Dutch, French, German, Italian, Portuguese, Russian and Spanish.

Gingold served as a vice-president of the International Federation of Translators, and in 1970 he became director of the Interlingua Institute.

Gingold died July 19, 1997.

== Publications ==
=== As author ===
- Gingold, Kurt; Rochow, Eugene G.; Seyferth, Dietmar; Smith, Albert C.; West, Robert (1952). "Ionization of Organometallic Halides". Journal of the American Chemical Society. 74 (24): 6306. Bibcode:1952JAChS..74.6306G. doi:10.1021/ja01144a532.
- Rochow, Eugene G.; Gingold, Kurt (1954). "The Conversion of Chlorosilanes to Siloxanes by Dimethylformamide". Journal of the American Chemical Society. 76 (19): 4852–5. Bibcode:1954JAChS..76.4852R. doi:10.1021/ja01648a025.
- Kurt Gingold, Systems of Chlorosilanes and Amides, Harvard University, 1954.
- Gingold, Kurt (1961). "Translation Pools - Ideal and Reality". Journal of Chemical Documentation. 1 (2): 14–19. doi:10.1021/c160002a005.

=== As translator ===
- Mirra Osipovna Korshun, Simultaneous Rapid Combustion (Methods in Microanalysis 1), edited by J. A. Kuck. Translated from the Russian by Phyllis L. Bolton and Kurt Gingold. Gordon and Breach, New York, 1964.
- Aleksandr Petrovich Terentʹev, et al., Wet combustion and catalytic methods in microanalysis (Methods in Microanalysis 2), edited by J. A. Kuck. Translated by Kurt Gingold. Gordon & Breach, 1965.
- J. A. Kuck (ed.), Determination of carbon and hydrogen and the use of new combustion catalysts (Methods in Microanalysis 3). Translated by Kurt Gingold. Gordon and Breach, 1968.
- M. A. Dalin, I. K. Kolchin, B. R. Serebryakov, Acrylonitrile. Translated by Kurt Gingold. Westport Conn.: Technomic, 1971.
- Kurt Gingold, Soviet Urethane Technology (Soviet Progress in Polyurethanes series). CRC Press, 1973. ISBN 0-87762-069-5
- Natal'ia Petrovna Bechtereva, The Neurophysiological Aspects of Human Mental Activity. Translated from the Russian by Kurt Gingold and James Woodbury. 2nd edition. New York: Oxford University Press, 1978. ISBN 0-19-502131-2 Originally published in Russian, Leningrad: Meditsina Publishing House, 1974.
- Kurt Gingold, Synthesis and Physical Chemistry of Urethanes (Soviet Progress in Polyurethanes series). CRC Press, 1975. ISBN 978-0-87762-157-7
- J. A. Kuck (ed.), The determination of oxygen, selenium, chromium and tungsten (Methods in Microanalysis 5). Translated by Kurt Gingold. Gordon and Breach, 1977. ISBN 0-677-20920-7 "Translated microchemical research papers of contemporary microanalysts in Italy, West Germany, Czechoslovakia, Hungary, Poland, Yugoslavia and the Soviet Union"
- J. A. Kuck (ed.), The determination of sulfur in the presence of other elements or simultaneously with them (Methods in Microanalysis 6). Translated by Kurt Gingold. Gordon and Breach, 1978. "microchemical research papers of contemporary microanalysts in Bulgaria, Czechoslovakia, Hungary, Poland, Roumania and the Soviet Union"
- Mark Efimovich Vol'pin (ed.), Chemistry Reviews, Vol. 4. Translated by Kurt Gingold. Soviet Scientific Reviews Series. Gordon & Breach Publishing Group, 1982. ISBN 3-7186-0114-1
- M. G. Voronkov, E. A. Maletina, V. K. Roman,Heterosiloxanes: Derivatives of Non-Biogenic Elements Vol 1 (Soviet Scientific Reviews). Translated by Kurt Gingold. Harwood Academic (Medical, Reference and Social Science), 1988. ISBN 3-7186-4811-3
