= Fien =

Fien is a feminine given name and surname which may refer to:

- Casey Fien (born 1983), American former Major League Baseball pitcher
- Cassie Fien (born 1985), Australian marathon runner
- Gavin Fien (born 2007), American baseball player
- Nathan Fien (born 1979), New Zealand former rugby league footballer
- Fien Delbaere (born 1996), Belgian racing cyclist
- Fien van Eynde (born 1998), Belgian racing cyclist
- Fien Troch (born 1978), Belgian film director, producer and screenwriter

== See also ==
- Fein (disambiguation)
- Feen (disambiguation)
