= Alfred Gingold =

American freelance writer

Alfred Gingold is an American freelance writer and is the author of several humorous books.

== Life ==
Alfred Gingold was born and raised in New York City. He attended Cornell University where he studied English and theater and was a member of the Quill and Dagger society. After working in several fields such as acting, directing, and teaching; Gingold became a full-time freelance writer. As a freelance writer Gingold worked for numerous publications including Esquire magazine, The New York Times, and Harper's Bazaar. Gingold also authored an online column entitled "Don't Ask" through the Prodigy Internet Service. Gingold also covered the 2002 Westminster Dog Show for Slate magazine.

Gingold is probably best known for his humorous works including Fire in the John, a parody of the modern men's movement. His other notable works include Items from Our Catalog, The House Trap, and Dog World and the Humans Who Live There.

Gingold married Helen Rogan with which he co-authored a number of books including The Cool Parents' Guide to All of New York: Excursions and Activities in and around Our City Your Children Will Love and You Won't Think Are Too Bad Either and Brooklyn's Best: Sightseeing, Shopping, Eating, and Happy Wandering in the Borough of Kings.

== Selected bibliography ==
- Items from Our Catalog (1982)
- More Items from Our Catalog (1983)
- The House Trap (1988)
- Fire in the John (1991)
- Dog World: And the Humans Who Live There (2005)
