= Alan Feinstein (philanthropist) =

American philanthropist (1931–2024)

- Born: June 25, 1931; Milton, Massachusetts, U.S.
- Died: September 7, 2024 (aged 93)
- Education: Boston University
- Occupations: Philanthropist mail-order internet promoter

Alan Shawn Feinstein (June 25, 1931 – September 7, 2024) was an American philanthropist and mail-order and internet promoter.

== Biography ==
=== Early years ===
Alan Shawn Feinstein was born in Milton, Massachusetts on June 25, 1931. He grew up in Dorchester, Massachusetts.

Feinstein graduated from Boston University, where he studied economics and journalism. After graduating, he wrote advertisements for a shoe company but was unsatisfied with the experience. He attended Boston Teachers' College at night and taught elementary and junior high school in Massachusetts and Rhode Island.

Feinstein married Pratarnporn Chiemwichit, a child psychiatrist, in 1963 and moved to Rhode Island. As part of an extended trip to Thailand in 1965, Feinstein had a private audience with King Bhumibol Adulyadej. The couple returned in 1966 and settled in Cranston, Rhode Island, where Feinstein lived until his death.

Feinstein and his wife have three children: Leila Feinstein, a television news anchor at KTLA; Ari, a salesman and entrepreneur who died in 2021; and Richard, a writer who died in 2008.

=== Business ===
His booklet, Making Your Money Grow, was advertised in various publications and sold several hundred thousand copies. He built his newsletter and collectibles business by buying mailing lists from brokers. He established two newsletters, International Insider's Report and The Wealth Maker, which attracted circulation of 400,000. Feinstein offered collectibles, including coins and president autographs, as well as such items as a gold-leaf-lined set of cards honoring Babe Ruth's 100th birthday issued by Guyana in collaboration with Feinstein.

Feinstein also started a newspaper column that was widely syndicated. He wrote several self-published booklets: "How to Make Money," "How to Make Money Fast," etc. He also wrote a novel and several children's books, which were published by A.S. Barnes/Yoseloff Publishing Company. In 1984, Prentice Hall published The Four Treasures of Alan Shawn Feinstein, a book written by a New York author, Milton Pierce.

Much of Feinstein's wealth came from selling philatelic 'collectibles' through newsletters independent of the stamp collector community under a business model in which purchasers had a one-year money-back guarantee, including a "Face on Mars" stamp set issued by Sierra Leone promoted with a claim that the value of the stamps would soar once alien life was discovered on Mars, a claim that has garnered him criticism. Feinstein's stamps have been valued at lower prices than his newsletters predicted.

=== Philanthropy and controversy ===
Feinstein founded the Feinstein Foundation in 1991. By 2008, over 125,000 children have been in his school program and are recognized as Feinstein Junior Scholars for promising to do good deeds for others.

Feinstein was heavily involved in founding the first public high school with community service as its central focus, the Feinstein High School in Providence, named in his honor.

Feinstein required that institutions that he aided be renamed in either his honor or in the names of his family members, a practice that has sometimes resulted in controversy due to the source of his funds and also because of his purchases of time on local television stations advertising his donations.

The focus of Feinstein's community service efforts has been in helping raise funds to fight hunger, which has included the annual "Feinstein Challenge", initiated in 1996, which encourages local organizations to raise funds with a portion of the amounts raised by the organizations matched by the foundation, with $1 million distributed annually. The Feinstein Challenges have raised over $1 billion for them to date.

The Feinstein Foundation and Feinstein Family Fund had about $43 million in assets in 2005.

Feinstein offered a payback program to Rhode Island students who join in supporting his campaign to fight hunger.

Alan Shawn Feinstein's 2012 15th annual spring $1 million giveaway to fight hunger raised $230,664,188 nationwide.

1863 anti-hunger agencies and houses of worship throughout the country participated. The Feinstein $1 million is being divided proportionally among them.

Feinstein started his yearly $1 million spring giveaway in 1997. Since its inception, his annual campaign every March and April has raised over $2.5 billion.

=== Death ===
Feinstein died on September 7, 2024, at the age of 93.

== Brandeis lawsuit ==
In the early 1990s, Feinstein collaborated with Brown University to found the Feinstein World Hunger Program, a university research and teaching center dedicated to studying the causes of and possible solutions to hunger, which later moved to Tufts University. In 2000, he entered into an agreement with a Tufts professor, J. Larry Brown, to give $3 million to start another similar center at Brandeis University. A dispute between them developed, and Feinstein sued Brown. In his lawsuit, Feinstein also accused Brown of defamation, a claim that was later dismissed.

== Westerly controversy ==
Initially offering $1 million to Westerly Middle School in Westerly, Rhode Island, Feinstein withdrew because of a controversy in the community over his requirement that the school be renamed for him. Feinstein said, "If it's going to cause any friction whatsoever, I would rather withdraw the offer."

== Awards ==
Feinstein has received many awards for his philanthropy, including the Distinguished Services Award from the American History Society, the Longfellow Humanitarian Award from the American Red Cross, and was named Rhode Island Citizen of the Year by the March of Dimes. He was awarded the President's Medal at both Rhode Island College and Brown. He has been named to the Rhode Island Hall of Fame. He has been awarded honorary doctorates by Providence College, Salve Regina University, Johnson & Wales University, Roger Williams University, Rhode Island College, the University of Rhode Island, and the New England Institute of Technology.

Several schools are named in his honor. The most recent, Alan Shawn Feinstein Middle School of Coventry (Formerly Knotty Oak), is named after him after he donated 1 million dollars to the school, making community service a requisite there.

== IMAX lawsuit ==
Feinstein had signed an agreement with IMAX in 2003 to name the firm's IMAX theater at the Providence Place Mall after his foundation. In exchange for a total of $1.4 million paid over five years, the theater would offer 50,000 free tickets to students participating in Feinstein's community service programs, offer discounted admission to students who have performed good deeds, and donate a portion of these ticket sales to the Rhode Island Hunger Fund. The agreement was extended in 2005 with the stipulation that the naming rights would become permanent if all conditions were met. After the theater was purchased by National Amusements in January 2008, The Feinstein name was removed, and the community programs were suspended. Feinstein filed a lawsuit against IMAX and National Amusements, but National Amusements asserts that its deal to purchase the theater included the furniture and equipment but no other obligations. IMAX settled with Feinstein out of court for an undisclosed amount.

== Books by Alan Feinstein ==
- Triumph! (1960)
- Folk Tales from Siam (1969)
- Folk Tales from Persia (1971)
- Folk Tales from Portugal (1972)
- How to Make Money Fast (1975)
