= Damachava =

Urban-type settlement in Brest Region, Belarus

Damachava Дамачава (Belarusian)
- Urban-type settlement
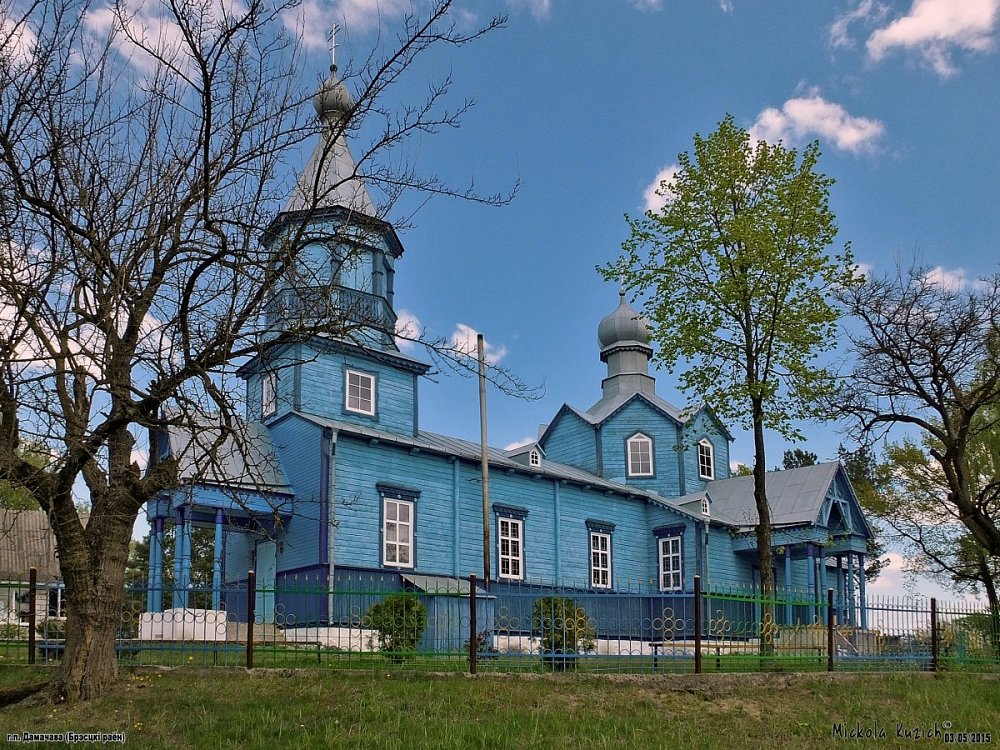

- Location within Belarus
- Coordinates: 51°45′N 23°36′E
- Country: Belarus
- Region: Brest Region
- District: Brest District
- Founded: 1700s

Population (2026)
  - Total: 1,162
- Time zone: UTC+3 (MSK)

Damachava (Belarusian: Дама́чава, romanized: Damačava; Russian: Дома́чево, romanized: Domachevo; Polish: Domaczewo) is an urban-type settlement in Brest District, Brest Region, Belarus. As of 2026, it has a population of 1,162.

== History ==
Within the Grand Duchy of Lithuania, Damachava was part of Brest Litovsk Voivodeship. In 1795, Damachava was acquired by the Russian Empire as a result of the Third Partition of Poland.

From 1921 until 1939, Damachava (Domaczewo) was part of the Second Polish Republic. In September 1939, Damachava was occupied by the Red Army and, on 14 November 1939, incorporated into the Byelorussian SSR.

From 21 June 1941 until 23 July 1944, Damachava was occupied by Nazi Germany and administered as a part of the Generalbezirk Wolhynien-Podolien of Reichskommissariat Ukraine.

The majority of the town inhabitants were Jewish before World War II. From November 1941, the Jews were kept imprisoned in a ghetto. In September 1942 they were murdered in a mass execution.

== Notable people ==
- Anthony Sawoniuk (1921–2005), a resident of Damachava who fled after murdering Jews during the Holocaust. Later working as a ticket collector in Britain, he was sentenced to life imprisonment for the murder of 18 Jews in the United Kingdom's only war crimes trial.
