= Yoann Feynman =

Yoann Feynian
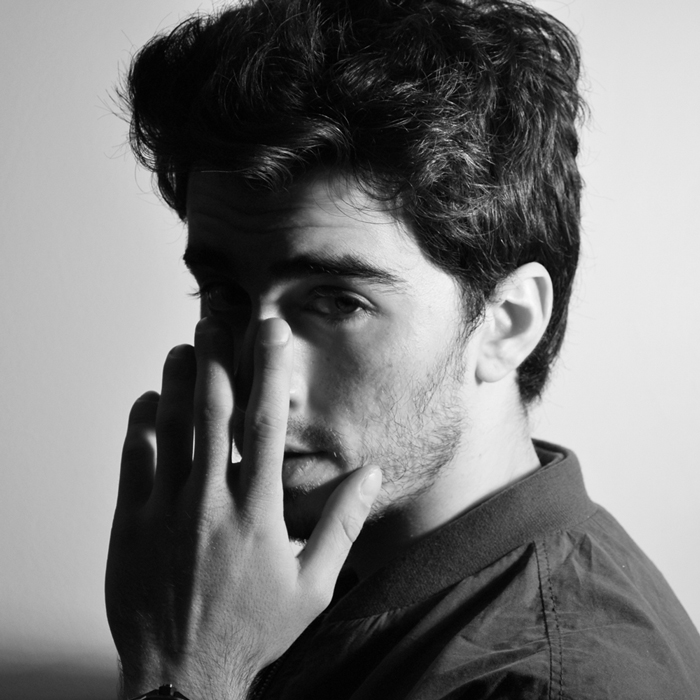

Background information
- Also known as: YFM, FEYNIAN
- Born: 20 March 1990 (age 35); Paris, France
- Genres: Electronic, Experimental, Techno, House, Disco-House
- Occupation: Interpret
- Years active: 2008
- Labels: FAKE MUSIC
- Website: www.yoannfeynian.com

Yoann Feynian (born 20 March 1990) is a French musician.

== Biography ==
Feynian, born in Paris, is a French interpret. He is also part of the record label and artist collective FAKE MUSIC. He started listening to music when he was 17 and was with French artist Monomotion in 2008. He also mixed music under various aliases such as YFM (with Monomotion) and FEYNIAN. He used to play compo from his friends.

He stopped all activities in 2009.

== Discography ==
=== EPs(2017) ===
- (2015)
- (2014)
- (2013)

=== Singles ===
- No music (2008)
- Stealer (2009)
- Zero mind (2008)
- Fake! (2008)
- Fail (2008)
- Stink (2008)
- Buckethead (2008)
- Feynian - Memories Part I (2008)
- Feynian - Miso (2008)

== Remixes ==
- 2008:
  - Joachim Garraud - Invasion (Yoann Feynman remix)
- 2009:Records
  - Records
- 2011:
  - Records
- 2014:
