= Brest district =

District of Brest region, Belarus

Brest district Брэсцкі раён (Belarusian) Брестский район (Russian)
- District
- Coat of arms

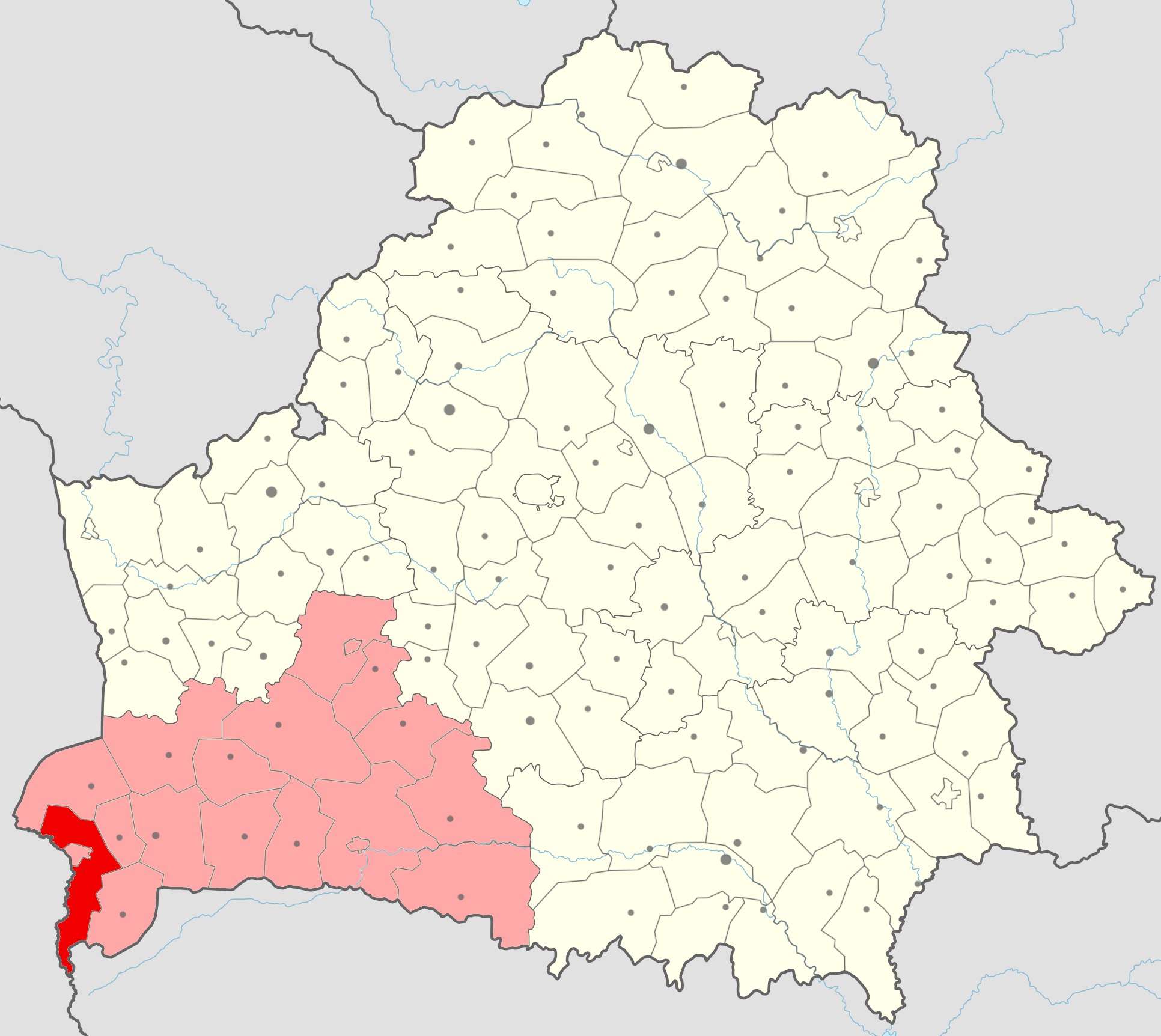
- Coordinates: 52°06′55″N 23°39′40″E
- Country: Belarus
- Region: Brest Region
- Formed: January 15, 1940
- Administrative center: Brest

Area
  - District: 1,533.89 km^{2} (592.24 sq mi)

Population (2024)
  - District: 45,658
  - Density: 29.766/km^{2} (77.094/sq mi)
  - Urban: 1,142
  - Rural: 44,516
- Time zone: UTC+3 (MSK)
- Website: brest.brest-region.gov.by

Brest district (Belarusian: Брэсцкі раён; Russian: Брестский район) is a district (raion) of Brest region in Belarus. Its administrative center is Brest, which is administratively separated from the district. As of 2024, it has a population of 45,658.

== Demographics ==
At the time of the 2009 Belarusian census, Brest district had a population of 39,426. Of these, 83.0% were of Belarusian, 8.1% Russian, 6.9% Ukrainian and 0.9% Polish ethnicity. 54.8% spoke Russian and 40.4% Belarusian as their native language. In 2023, it had a population of 45,629.

== Industries ==
This raion is specialized in agriculture. Several recreational areas like Belaye Lake, summer camps and rest homes along the Mukhavets River attract numerous tourists from the country and abroad.
