= Fein =

Fein or FEIN may refer to:

== People ==
- Adrian Fein (born 1999), German footballer
- Benjamin Fein (fl. 1910s), Jewish American gangster
- Bruce Fein (born 1947), American lawyer
- Clinton Fein (born 1964), South African artist, writer and activist
- Ellen Fein, co-author of the book The Rules
- Ephraim Fein, aka Ephraim Eitam (born 1952), Israeli brigadier general and politician
- Helen Fein (1934–2022), American historical sociologist and professor
- Mónica Fein (born 1957), Argentine biochemist and politician
- Monroe Fein (1923–1982), US Navy officer and captain of the Altalena in a 1948 confrontation between the Israeli Defense Forces and the Irgun
- Robert Fein (1907–1975), Austrian Olympic champion weightlifter
- Rusty Fein (born 1982), American figure skater
- Sylvia Fein (1919–2024), American painter and author
- Wilhelm Emil Fein (1842–1898), German inventor

== Other uses ==
- Fein and Sebé, characters in the anime Zatch Bell!
- Fein (company), founded by Wilhelm Fein
- Federal Employer Identification Number, used by the United States Internal Revenue Service
- "Fein" (song), a 2024 song by Travis Scott featuring Playboi Carti

== See also ==
- Fine (disambiguation)
- Fien, a list of people named Fien
- Feen (disambiguation)
- FEIN-Codierung Friedberger Eigentümer-Identifikations-Nummer, a system to mark personal items
