= Feingold =

Feingold is a surname. Notable people with the surname include:

- Benjamin Feingold (1899–1982), American pediatric allergist
  - Feingold diet, named after Benjamin Feingold
- David Sidney Feingold (1922–2019), American biochemist
- Eleanor Feingold, American statistical geneticist
- Ilay Feingold (born 2004), Israeli footballer
- Kenneth Feingold (born 1952), American artist
- Marko Feingold (1913–2019), Austrian Holocaust survivor
- Michael Feingold (1945–2022), American critic, translator, lyricist, and playwright
- Russ Feingold (born 1953), American politician
- Sharon Feingold, American voice actress
