= List of massacres in the Soviet Union =

The following is a list of massacres that took place in the Soviet Union. For massacres that took place in countries that were once part of the Soviet Union, list of massacres in that country.

Name	Date	Location	Deaths	Notes	Perpetrator
Execution of the Romanov family	1918, July 16–17	Yekaterinburg	11	Justified by the Bolsheviks as necessary to prevent the anti–communist White Army from rescuing them. The USSR repeatedly denied that Vladimir Lenin was responsible.	Bolshevik revolutionaries
Explosion in Leontievsky Lane	1919, September 25	Place of mass gathering of people in the premises of the Moscow Committee of the Russian Communist Party (Bolsheviks), Leontievsky Lane, Tverskoy District, Moscow	12		Russian anarchists
White Terror	1918–1922	Nationwide	20,000 to 300,000	For the purposes of political repression and elimination of opposition to White rule.	White movement and the Russian State
Red Terror	1918–1922	Nationwide	100,000 – 1,300,000	For the purposes of political repression and elimination of opposition to Bolshevik rule.	Soviet Union (Cheka)
Sinhanch'on Incident	1920, April 5	Sinhanch'on, Vladivostok, Far Eastern Republic	Several hundred	Massacre of Korean civilians by Japanese soldiers	Empire of Japan (Imperial Japanese Army)
Tambov Rebellion	19 August 1920 – June 1921	Tambov Governorate	15,000+ (figure of deaths due to execution only)	Total of 240,000 rebels and civilians killed by communist forces.	Soviet Union (Red Army, Cheka)
Free City incident	1921, June 28	Svobodny, Amur Oblast, Far Eastern Republic	36–272	The extent of casualties varies depending on the data. Data shows 36 deaths, 864 prisoners, and 59 missing, while other data records 272 deaths, 31 drownings, 250 missing, and 917 prisoners.	
First Decossackization	1919–1920s	Don and Kuban regions	Anywhere from 10,000 executed to 300,000 – 500,000 both deported and killed	The decossackization is sometimes described as a genocide of the Cossacks, although this view is disputed, with some historians asserting that this label is an exaggeration. The process has been described by scholar Peter Holquist as part of a "ruthless" and "radical attempt to eliminate undesirable social groups" that showed the Soviet Union's "dedication to social engineering".	Soviet Union (Red Army, Cheka)
1921–1923 famine in Ukraine	1921–1923	Ukraine	200,000–1,000,000	No systematic records of fatalities were then made.	
August Uprising	1924	Georgia	7,000–10,000	After the failed 1924 August uprising in Georgia, Red army detachments exterminated entire families, including women and children, in a series of raids. Mass executions also took place in prisons, where people were shot without trial. Hundreds were shot directly in railway trucks, so that the dead bodies could be removed faster.	Soviet Union (Red Army)
Shonguy massacre	1930, May 3	Shonguy, Kildinstroy, Kolsky District, Murmansk Oblast	15	Mass murder of 15 railway workers and their families by bandits at Shonguy station.	Bandits
Kazakh famine of 1930–33	1930–1933	Kazakhstan	1.5 – 2.3 million	Some historians and scholars consider that this famine amounted to genocide of the Kazakhs. The Soviet authorities undertook a campaign of persecution against the nomads in the Kazakhs, believing that the destruction of the class was a worthy sacrifice for the collectivization of Kazakhstan. Europeans in Kazakhstan had disproportionate power in the party which has been argued as a cause of why indigenous nomads suffered the worst part of the collectivization process rather than the European sections of the country.	
Holodomor	1932–1933	Ukraine	3.5–3.9 Million in Ukraine; in total: ~5.7 to 8.7 million	Scholars continue to debate "whether the man–made Soviet famine was a central act in a campaign of genocide, or whether it was designed to simply cow Ukrainian peasants into submission, drive them into the collectives and ensure a steady supply of grain for Soviet industrialization." Whether the Holodomor is a genocide is a significant issue in modern politics and there is no international consensus on whether Soviet policies would fall under the legal definition of genocide. A number of governments, such as the United States and Canada, have recognized the Holodomor as an act of genocide. However, David R. Marples states such decisions are mostly based on emotions, or on pressure by local groups rather than hard evidence. Robert Davies, Stephen Kotkin, and Stephen Wheatcroft reject the notion that Stalin intentionally wanted to kill the Ukrainians, but exacerbated the situation by enacting bad policies and ignorance of the problem, which, according to historian John Archibald Getty, was the overwhelming weight of opinion among scholars who studied the newly opened Soviet archives in 2000. In contrast according to Simon Payaslian, the scholarly consensus classifies the Holodomor as a genocide.	
Karatal Affair	1930	Karatal, Kazakhstan	18–19	Kazakhs families were shot dead in their attempt to flee to China with some of the victims including women and children even being raped.	Soviet Union (Soviet Border Troops)
Blacklisting of villages in Ukraine, Kazakhstan and the North Caucasus	1932–1933	Ukraine, Kazakhstan, North Caucasus (Kuban)	Unknown; hundreds of farms and dozens of districts affected. Some blacklisted areas in Kharkiv could have death rates exceeding 40% while in other areas such as Stalino blacklisting had no particular effect on mortality.	'Blacklisting, synonymous with a "board of infamy", was one of the elements of agitation–propaganda in the Soviet Union, and especially Ukraine and the ethnically Ukrainian Kuban region in the 1930s, coinciding with the Holodomor. Blacklisting was also used in Soviet Kazakhstan. The blacklist system was formalized in 1932 by the November 20 decree "The Struggle against Kurkul Influence in Collective Farms". A blacklisted collective farm, village, or raion (district) had its monetary loans and grain advances called in, stores closed, grain supplies, livestock and food confiscated as a "penalty" and was cut off from trade. Its Communist Party and collective farm committees were purged and subject to arrest, and their territory was forcibly cordoned off by the OGPU secret police. In the end 37 out of 392 districts along with at least 400 collective farms were put on the "black board" in Ukraine, more than half of the farms in the Dnipropetrovsk Oblast alone. In 1932, 32 (out of less than 200) districts in Kazakhstan that did not meet grain production quotas were blacklisted.	
Sealing of the Ukrainian borders during the Soviet famine	1932–1933	Ukraine	150,000	Joseph Stalin signed the January 1933 secret decree named "Preventing the Mass Exodus of Peasants who are Starving", restricting travel by peasants after requests for bread began in the Kuban and Ukraine; Soviet authorities blamed the exodus of peasants during the famine on anti–Soviet elements, saying that "like the outflow from Ukraine last year, was organized by the enemies of Soviet power." During a single month in 1933, 219,460 people were either intercepted and escorted back or arrested and sentenced. It has been estimated that there were some 150,000 excess deaths as a result of this policy, and one historian asserts that these deaths constitute a crime against humanity. In contrast, historian Stephen Kotkin argues that the sealing of the Ukrainian borders caused by the internal passport system was in order to prevent the spread of famine–related diseases.	
Searches for hidden grain in Ukraine	Early 1933	Ukraine	Possibly 550,000 people had food confiscated from them and an unknown number of them died	Between January and mid–April 1933, a factor contributing to a surge of deaths within certain regions of Ukraine during the period was the relentless search for alleged hidden grain by the confiscation of all foodstuffs from certain households, which Stalin implicitly approved of through a telegram he sent on the 1 January 1933 to the Ukrainian government reminding Ukrainian farmers of the severe penalties for not surrendering grain they may be hiding. In his review of Anne Applebaum's book Mark Tauger gives a rough estimate of those affected by the search for hidden pra reserves: "In chapter 10 Applebaum describes the harsh searches that local personnel, often Ukrainian, imposed on villages, based on a Ukrainian memoir collection (222), and she presents many vivid anecdotes. Still she never explains how many people these actions affected. She cites a Ukrainian decree from November 1932 calling for 1100 brigades to be formed (229). If each of these 1100 brigades searched 100 households, and a peasant household had five people, then they took food from 550,000 people, out of 20 million, or about 2–3 percent."	
Great purge	1936–1938	Nationwide	700,000–1,200,000	Ordered by Joseph Stalin.	Soviet Union (NKVD)
Serpantinka	1937–1938	Magadan Oblast	Unknown	Number of victims unknown.	Soviet Union (NKVD)
Finnish Operation of the NKVD	1937–1938	Nationwide	8,000–25,000	Mass arrest, execution and deportations of persons of Finnish origin by NKVD during the Great Purge.	Soviet Union (NKVD)
Estonian Operation of the NKVD	1937–1938	Nationwide	4,672	Mass arrest, execution and deportations of persons of Estonian origin by NKVD during the Great Purge.	Soviet Union (NKVD)
Polish Operation of the NKVD	1937, August – 1938, November	Nationwide	111,091	Largest ethnic shooting during the Great Purge. Polish Nationalism was a very big movement in The USSR at the time, resulting in the deaths of many Polish Nationalists dubbed as "Fascists" by The Soviet Union.	Soviet Union (NKVD)
Latvian Operation of the NKVD	1937–1938	Nationwide	16,573+		Soviet Union (NKVD)
1937 mass execution of Belarusians	1937, 29–30 October	Byelorussian SSR	132	Mass extermination of Belarusian writers, artists and statespeople by the Soviet Union occupying authorities.	Soviet Union (NKVD)
Kurapaty massacres	1937–1941	Kurapaty, Minsk, Byelorussian SSR	7,000–30,000	NKVD summary executions.	Soviet Union (NKVD)
Bykivnia graves	1937–1941	Kyiv, Ukrainian SSR	30,000–100,000		Soviet Union (NKVD)
Sandarmokh	1937–1938	Sandarmokh, Karelia	9,000 (Disputed)	Mass executions of prisoners. 1,111 of the executed were transferred from Solovki prison camp.	Soviet Union (NKVD)
Stalinist repressions in Mongolia	1937–1939	Mongolian People's Republic	20,000–35,000		Soviet Union (NKVD)
Vinnytsia massacre	1937–1938	Vinnytsia, Ukraine	9,000–11,000 (Disputed)		Soviet Union (NKVD)
Tatarka common graves	1938–1940	Tatarka [uk], Odesa, Ukrainian SSR	3,500–5,000		Soviet Union (NKVD)
Massacre at Dem'ianiv Laz	1939–1941	Pasieczna (Now Pasichna), Soviet–occupied Poland, modern Ivano–Frankivsk	At least 524	At least 524 captives (including 150 women with dozens of children) were shot by the NKVD.	Soviet Union (NKVD)
Battle of Grodno	September 1939	Grodno, Occupied Poland	300	Some 300 Poles were murdered in Grodno following the battle.	Soviet Union (Red Army)
Malaya Berestavitsa massacre	September 1939	Malaya Berestavitsa, Occupied Poland	8		Pro–communist militia
Battle of Husynne	24 September 1939	Husynne, Occupied Poland	25		Soviet Union (Red Army)
Battle of Szack	28 September 1939	Mielniki (Shatsk), Occupied Poland	18	18 Polish POWs were executed after the battle.	Soviet Union (Red Army)
Mokrany massacre	28 September 1939	Makrany, Occupied Poland	18		Soviet Union (Red Army)
1940–1942 Red Army purges	1940–1942	Across the Soviet Union	Unknown		Soviet Union (NKVD)
Katyn massacre	1940, April–May	Katyn Forest, Kalinin and Kharkiv prisons	21,857	Mass executions of Polish nationals by NKVD.	Soviet Union (NKVD)
Lunca massacre	1941, 7 February	Lunka, Ukraine	600	Hundreds of civilians (mostly ethnic Romanians) were killed when Soviet Border troops opened fire on them while they were attempting to forcefully cross the border from the Soviet Union to Romania, near the village of Lunca, now Lunka in Chernivtsi Oblast.	Soviet Union (NKVD)
Zhestianaya Gorka massacre	1941–1943	Zhestianaya Gorka, Novgorod Oblast	2,600	Massacre of partisans and civilians, mostly women and children by Schutzmannschaft and Nazi collaborators.	Nazi Germany (Latvia Auxiliary Police, Einsatzgruppen)
Fântâna Albă massacre	1941, April 1	Northern Bukovina	44–3,000	Between 44 and 3,000 civilians were killed by Soviet Border Troops as they attempted to cross the border from the Soviet Union to Romania near the village of Fântâna Albă, now Staryi Vovchynets in Chernivtsi Oblast, Ukraine.	Soviet Union (NKVD)
NKVD prisoner massacres in Lviv	June 1941	Lviv, Occupied Poland	3,500–7,000		Soviet Union (NKVD)
NKVD prisoner massacres	1941, June–July	Occupied Poland, Belarus, Ukraine, Baltic states	~100,000	The NKVD prisoner massacres were a series of mass executions of political prisoners carried out by the NKVD, the People's Commissariat for Internal Affairs of the Soviet Union, across Eastern Europe, primarily Poland, Ukraine, the Baltic states, and Bessarabia. After the start of the German invasion of the Soviet Union on June 22, 1941, the NKVD troops were supposed to evacuate political prisoners into the interior of the Soviet Union, but the hasty retreat of the Red Army, the lack of transportation and other supplies and the general disregard for legal procedures often meant that the prisoners were executed. Approximately two thirds of the 150,000 prisoners were murdered; most of the rest were transported into the interior of the Soviet Union, but some were abandoned in the prisons if there was no time to execute them, and others managed to escape.	Soviet Union (NKVD)
Lviv pogroms (1941)	1941, June–July	Lviv, Occupied Poland	2,000–7,000		Nazi Germany (Einsatzgruppen C) Organisation of Ukrainian Nationalists (OUN–B) Local crowds
Lukiškės Prison massacre	June 1941	Lukiškės Prison, Lithuanian SSR	Unknown		Soviet Union (NKVD)
Evacuation of Chortkiv Prison	1941, June–July	Chortkiv, Occupied Poland	890+		Soviet Union (NKVD)
NKVD prisoner massacre in Sambir	June 22–27, 1941	Sambir, Occupied Poland	around 600		Soviet Union (NKVD)
Bombings and destruction of Kyiv 1941–1942	22 June 1941–1942	Kyiv, Ukrainian SSR,	200,000		Nazi Germany (Luftwaffe, SS, Wehrmacht)
NKVD prisoner massacre in Lutsk	June 23, 1941	Lutsk, Eastern Poland/Western Ukraine	around 2,000	Mass execution of Prisoners, mainly Ukrainians and Poles by the NKVD and NKGB	Soviet Union (NKVD)
Berezwecz–Taklinovo Death Road	23 June–28 June 1941	Berezwecz, Occupied Poland	1,000–2,000		Soviet Union (NKVD)
NKVD prisoner massacre in Dubno	June 23–25, 1941	Dubno, Occupied Poland	500–550		Soviet Union (NKVD)
Vileyka–Barysaw Death Road	24 June 1941	Vileyka, Occupied Poland	500–800		Soviet Union (NKVD)
Valozhyn–Tarasovo Death Road	June 24–25, 1941	Valozhyn, Occupied Poland (present–day Belarus).	100		Soviet Union (NKVD)
Rainiai massacre	June 24–25, 1941	Telšiai, Lithuanian SSR	70–80		Soviet Union (NKVD)
Chervyen massacre	25–27 June 1941	Chervyen, Byelorussian SSR	Several hundred–18,000	The exact death toll is unknown, and while the number of 18,000 killed is possibly inflated, several hundred are estimated to have been killed minimum.	Soviet Union (NKVD)
Pravieniškės massacre	26 June 1941	Pravieniškės	260	NKVD executed about 260 people, including prison guards.	Soviet Union (NKVD)
NKVD prisoner massacre in Berezhany	June 26–30, 1941	Berezhany, Occupied Eastern Poland/Ukrainian SSR	174–300		Soviet Union (NKVD)
Łącki prison massacre	28 June 1941	Frankivskyi District, Lviv, Ukrainian SSR	1681		Soviet Union (NKVD)
NKVD prisoner massacre in Zolochiv	June 1941	Zolochiv, Occupied Poland	650–720		Soviet Union (NKVD)
Dobromyl massacre	June and July 1941	Dobromyl, Ukrainian SSR	500–1,000		Soviet Union (NKVD)
Massacre of Broniki	July 1, 1941	Broniki, Ukrainian SSR	153	Killing of members of the Wehrmacht by soldiers of the Red Army.	Soviet Union (Red Army)
2nd Czortków massacre	2 July 1941	Czortków, Occupied Poland	8		Soviet Union (NKVD)
NKVD prisoner massacre in Tartu	July 9, 1941	Tartu, Estonian SSR	193	193 detainees were shot in Tartu prison and the Gray House courtyard by NKVD.	Soviet Union (NKVD)
Lychkovo massacre	July 18, 1941	Lychkovo, Demyansky	Around 41	Mass killing of 41 people, primarily children, by Nazi Germany.	Nazi Germany (Luftwaffe)
Kautla massacre	24 July 1941	Kautla, Estonian SSR	20+		Soviet Union (NKVD)
Pripyat Marshes massacres	28 July– 29 August 1941 (or 31 August)	Pinsk Marshes, Byelorussian and Ukrainian Soviet Socialist Republics	13,788 (phase one), 3,500 (phase two)		Nazi Germany (Wehrmacht, Waffen–SS)
Kamianets–Podilskyi massacre	1941, August 27–28	Kamianets–Podilskyi	23,600	23,600 Hungarian and Ukrainian Jews were murdered by the German Police Battalion 320 along with Friedrich Jeckeln's Einsatzgruppen, Hungarian soldiers, and the Ukrainian Auxiliary Police.	Nazi Germany (Einsatzgruppen, Police Battalion 320, Ukrainian Auxiliary Police) Kingdom of Hungary (Royal Hungarian Army)
Pavoloch massacre	5 September 1941	Pavoloch, Ukrainian SSR	1,500		Nazi Germany (Einsatzgruppen)
Medvedev Forest massacre	1941, September 11	Medvedev Forest, near Oryol	157	Soviet massacre of political prisoners.	Soviet Union (NKVD)
Nikolaev massacre	16–30 September 1941	Mykolaiv (also known as Nikolaev), Kherson, Ukrainian SSR	35,782		Nazi Germany (Einsatzgruppe D)
Babi Yar	29–30 September 1941	Kiev, Ukrainian SSR	33,771 in first 2 days, 100,000–150,000		Nazi Germany (Einsatzgruppen, Order Police battalions, Ukrainian Auxiliary Police, Sonderkommando 4a, Wehrmacht)
1941 Odessa massacre	1941, October 22–24	Odessa	34,000–100,000	Romanian and German troops, supported by local authorities, massacred Jews in Odesa and the surrounding towns in Transnistria.	Kingdom of Romania Nazi Germany (Einsatzgruppe)
Slutsk massacre	27 to 28 October 1941	Slutsk, Byelorussian SSR	8,000–10,000		Nazi Germany (Gestapo, Lithuanian Auxiliary Police)
Barbysh massacre	28 October 1941	Barbysh, Kuybyshev, Russian SSR	20	Filipp Goloshchyokin was among those killed.	Soviet Union (NKVD)
Petrushino Massacres	1941, October 29 – 1943, August 21	Outskirts of Taganrog	7,000	Over 7,000 Soviet civilians and POWs, and members of the Taganrog resistance movement were massacred by the German army, with the assistance of non–German divisions, during their occupation of Taganrog.	Nazi Germany
1st Simferopol massacre	31 October 1941	Simferopol, Ukrainian SSR	Unknown		Soviet Union (NKVD)
1st Chachersk massacre	November 1941	Chachersk, Chachersk District, Byelorussian SSR	80		Nazi Germany (Einsatzgruppen, Wehrmacht, Belarusian Auxiliary Police)
Yalta massacre	4 November 1941	Yalta, Ukrainian SSR	Unknown		
2nd Simferopol massacre	9 December 1941	Simferopol, Ukrainian SSR	14,300		Nazi Germany
2nd Chachersk massacre	28 December 1941	Chachersk, Chachersk District, Byelorussian SSR	432		Nazi Germany (Einsatzgruppen, Wehrmacht, Belarusian Auxiliary Police)
Zmievskaya Balka massacre	1942–1943	Zmievskaya Balka, Rostov–on–Don	27,000 Jews and other Soviet Civilians	Organized by Nazi forces; part of the Holocaust in Russia.	
Massacre of Feodosia	1941, December 29, 1942, January 1	Feodosia, Crimea	160	Murder of 160 German POWs by Red Army.	Soviet Union (Red Army)
The Pit massacre	2 March 1942	Minsk, Byelorussian SSR	5,000		Nazi Germany (Schutzstaffel)
Odradna Balka massacre	15–16 March 1942	Odradna Balka, Ukrainian SSR	200+		
Dzyatlava massacre	1942, April 30– August 10	Zdzięcioł (now, Dzyatlava)	3,000–5,000	About 3,000–5,000 Jews were killed near the town of Dzyatlava by a German death squad aided by the Lithuanian and the Belarusian Auxiliary Police battalions.	
Sernyky massacre	August–September 1942	Serniki, Rivne Oblast, Ukrainian SSR	553		Nazi Germany
Nizhny Chir massacre	1942, September 2	Nizhny Chir, Stalingrad Oblast	47	Killing of 47 children with intellectual disabilities organized by Nazi forces.	
Kortelisy massacre	22–23 September 1942	Kortelisy, Ukrainian SSR	2,892		
Cherek tragedy	1942, November 27 – December 04	Chereksky District, Kabardino–Balkarian Autonomous Soviet Socialist Republic	1,500	Mass murder of 1,500 civilians by the combined detachment of the 11th SD NKVD	Soviet Union (NKVD)
Massacre of Grishino	February 1943	Pokrovsk, Ukrainian SSR	596	A total of 596 prisoners of war, nurses, construction workers and female communication personnel (Nachrichtenhelferinnen) were killed.	Soviet Union (Red Army)
Koriukivka massacre	1–2 March 1943	Koriukivka, Soviet Ukraine	6,700–7,000		Nazi Germany (Schutzstaffel) Kingdom of Hungary (Royal Hungarian Army)
Khatyn massacre	1943, March 22	Khatyn	Around 149 people, including 75 children under 16 years of age.	Extermination of a whole village in Belarus by Nazi Germany.	Nazi Germany (Schutzmannschaft Battalion 118 of the Ukrainian Auxiliary Police, SS–Sonderbataillon Dirlewanger)
Bolshoye Zarechye massacre	1943, October 30	Bolshoye Zarechye, Leningrad Oblast	66	Soviet civilians were shot and burned alive by the German Army.	Nazi Germany (Wehrmact)
Krasukha massacre	1943, November 27	Krasukha, Pskov Oblast	280	Soviet civilians were burned alive by the German Army.	Nazi Germany (Wehrmact)
Khaibakh massacre	1944, February 27	Chechnya, Soviet Union	230–700	During the deportation of the Chechen and Ingush peoples. Siberian winter was too hard to handle for the Chechens, who lived in a mostly hot climate.	Soviet Union (NKVD)
Deportation of the Crimean Tatars	1944, May 18 – 20	Crimea	Various estimates		Soviet Union (NKVD)
Boraltan Bridge massacre	1945, August 6	Umut Bridge, Nakhichevan Autonomous Soviet Socialist Republic	195	195 victims of Azeri origin Soviet Soldiers prisoners of war executed by Soviets.	Soviet Union (NKVD)
Soviet assault on Maoka	1945, August 19–22	Maoka, South Sakhalin	1,377	3,400 troops of the Soviet Navy combined marine battalion and the 113th Rifle Brigade landed in Port Maoka (now Kholmsk). The landing party was met with fierce Japanese defense. A few naval vessels were damaged which led to the Soviet response of intense naval bombardment of the city, causing approximately 600 to 1,000 civilian deaths. Maoka was captured on 22 August, with heavy Japanese resistance continuing throughout the city. Japanese military casualties in this battle were 300 killed and 600 captured. Soviet casualties were 60 army soldiers killed and 17 naval infantry killed.	
Soviet famine of 1946–1947 in Ukraine	1946–1947	Ukraine	300,000–1,000,000		
Gîsca school bombing	4 April 1950	Gîsca, Moldavian Soviet Socialist Republic	24		Vladimir Georgievich Tatarnikov
1951 anti–Chechen pogrom in Kazakhstan	1951, April 10 – June 18	Kazakh SSR	41	Anti–Chechen pogrom	Amnestied criminals
Vorkuta uprising	1953, starting July 19	Vorkuta	42		Soviet Union (MVD)
Kengir uprising	1954, May 6 – June 26	Kengir, Steplag, Kazakh SSR	500–700		Soviet Union (MVD)
1956 Georgian demonstrations	1956, March 4–10	Tbilisi, Georgian SSR	22–800	Popular demonstrations begin in the Georgian Soviet Socialist Republic, protesting against Nikita Khrushchev's de–Stalinization policy.	Soviet Union (Soviet Army)
Novocherkassk massacre	1962, June 1 – 2	Novocherkassk, Rostov Oblast, Russian SFSR	26	Massacre of rallying unarmed civilians.	Soviet Union (Soviet Army, MVD, KGB)
1971 Krasnodar bus bombing	1971, June 14	Krasnodar	10	A homemade suitcase bomb placed near the gas tank by mentally ill Peter Volynsky exploded, killing 10 persons and wounding 20–90 others.	Peter Kuzmich Volynsky
Aeroflot Flight 773 bombing	1971, October 10	Near Baranovo, Naro–Fominsky District	25		Unknown
Aeroflot Flight 109 bombing	1973, May 18	Chita–Kadala International Airport, Chita Oblast	81	An Aeroflot Tupolev Tu–104B flying from Irkutsk Airport to Chita Airport exploded in flight after a passenger detonated a bomb when refused passage to China. The plane crashed east of Lake Baikal, killing all 82 passengers.	Chingis Yunusogly Rzayev
Letipea massacre	1976, August 8	Letipea, Estonian SSR	11 (including the perpetrator)	A conflict between workers and drunken Soviet border guards escalated when one of the guards opened fire with a machine gun, killing multiple workers as well as one of his fellow guards.	Viktor Bagižev
1977 Moscow bombings	1977, January 8	Moscow	7	A bomb was detonated on a Moscow Metro train as it rolled into Kurskaya station. 7 people died and 37 were seriously injured.	National United Party (alleged)
Korean Air Lines Flight 007	1983, September 1	Sea of Japan, near Moneron Island, west of Sakhalin Island	269	Korean Air Lines Flight 007 is shot down by Soviet Union Air Force Su–15 Flagon pilot Major Gennadi Osipovich near Moneron Island when the commercial aircraft enters Soviet airspace. All 269 on board are killed, including U.S. Congressman Larry McDonald. * September 6 – The Soviet Union admits to shooting down Korean Air Lines Flight 007, stating that the pilots did not know it was a civilian aircraft when it violated Soviet airspace.	Soviet Union (Soviet Air Forces)
Aeroflot Flight 6833 Hijacking	1983, November 18	Tbilisi, Georgian SSR to Leningrad	8	7 Georgians hijacked Aeroflot Flight 6833 in hopes of escaping the Soviet Union. The siege ended with Soviet forces storming the plane and resulting in the deaths of 3 passengers, 2 crew members and 3 hijackers. The remaining hijackers were executed.	
Jeltoqsan massacre	1986, December 16 – 19	Alma–Ata, Kazakh SSR	168–1,000	Mass anti–government protests, break out across the Kazakh SSR, resulting in the massacre of over 168–1,000 protesters.	
Sumgait massacre	1988, February 26 – March 1	Sumgait, Azerbaijan SSR	32		Azerbaijani rioters
Aeroflot Flight 3739 Hijacking	1988, March 8	Veshchevo	9 (including 5 of the hijackers)	A Tu–154B–2 (СССР–85413), was hijacked by the Ovechkin family, a family of 11 who were attempting to flee the Soviet Union and demanded to be flown to London. The flight engineer persuaded the hijackers to allow a stop in Finland to refuel, but the pilot tricked the hijackers by landing at Veshchevo instead. Realizing they had been tricked, one of the hijackers killed a flight attendant, Tamara Zharkaya. After landing, the aircraft was stormed and another hijacker blew himself up, starting a small fire in the tail that was quickly put out. Four hijackers committed suicide and three passengers also died during the takeover. Two surviving hijackers were tried and received prison sentences	
Gugark pogrom	March – December 1988	Gugark District, Armenian SSR	11 (per official Soviet data) 21 (per Arif Yunusov)	Anti–Azerbaijani pogroms in Response to similar pogroms of Armenians in Azerbaijan.	
Kirovabad pogrom	1988, November	Kirovabad, Azerbaijan SSR	7 (per Soviet authorities), 130 (per human rights activists)		Azerbaijani rioters
Tbilisi Massacre	1989, April 9	Tbilisi, Georgia	21	Hundreds of civilians were wounded and killed with sapper spades.	Soviet Union (Soviet Army)
Fergana massacre	1989, June 3 – 12	Fergana Valley, Uzbek SSR	97	At least 97 Meskhetian Turks had been killed and over 1000 wounded by Uzbek extremists.	Uzbek nationalist mobs
Novouzenskaya massacre	1989, June 17–28	Zhanaozen, Kazakh SSR	~200	Interethnic clashes on June 17–28, 1989 in the city of Novy Uzen of the Kazakh SSR between groups of Kazakhs and people from the North Caucasus.	
January Massacre	1990, January 19 – 20	Baku, Azerbaijan	131–170	Known also as the Black January (Qara Yanvar).	
1990 Dushanbe riots	1990, February 12 – 14	Dushanbe, Tajik SSR	26	Anti–Armenian and anti–communist unrest in Dushanbe, 565 injured.	
1990 Osh clashes	1990, June 4 – 6	Osh, Kyrgyz SSR	300–600 deaths (official estimate); 1,000–10,000 (unofficial estimate)	Ethnic conflict between Kyrgyz and Uzbeks	
1990 Tbilisi–Agdam bus bombing	1990, August 10	Khanlar, Azerbaijan	15–20	A bus carrying about 60 passengers from Georgia's capital Tbilisi to Aghdam in Azerbaijan is bombed in Khanlar (now Goygol). The bombing was carried out by two ethnic Armenians named Armen Avanesyan and Mikhail Tatevosov, who were members of Vrezh, an underground militant anti–Azerbaijan group operated out of Rostov–on–Don.	Vrezh (Armen Avanesyan, Mikhail Tatevosov)
January Events	1991, January 11 – 13	Vilnius, Lithuania	14	After Lithuania recently declared its independence, the USSR sent in the army to crackdown on the "nationalist government". Immediately, hundreds of thousands of unarmed Lithuanians went to the streets to defend the local parliament, TV tower, the radio station and other key buildings. 14 people died during the violence. In 2019, Lithuania sentenced 67 people for war crimes and crimes against humanity.	Soviet Union (Soviet Army)
Patrikeyevo massacree	1991, July 14	Patrikeyevo, Bazarnosyzgansky District, Ulyanovsk Oblast	11	Privates Vitaly Semenikhin and S. Muradov killed 8 soldiers, 3 warrant officers and wounded 2 other soldiers.	Vitaly Semenikhin and S. Muradov

== See also ==
- List of massacres in Russia
- List of massacres in Ukraine
- List of massacres in Belarus
- List of massacres in Lithuania
- List of massacres in Latvia
- List of massacres in Poland
- Mass killings in the Soviet Union
- Soviet war crimes
- The Holocaust in Russia
- The Holocaust in Belarus
- The Holocaust in Ukraine
- World War II casualties of the Soviet Union
