= Soviet atrocities committed against prisoners of war during World War II =

During World War II, the Soviet Union committed various atrocities against prisoners of war (POWs). These actions were carried out by the People's Commissariat for Internal Affairs (NKVD) and the Red Army. In some cases, the crimes were sanctioned or directly ordered by Joseph Stalin and the Soviet leadership.

Before the German invasion of the USSR, the USSR, which had recently annexed parts of Poland as well as the Baltic states, carried out the Katyn massacre of 1940, a series of mass executions of over 20,000 Polish citizens, including 8,000 Polish Army officers, and smaller scale massacres of Baltic states officers. After being invaded by Germany, the USSR carried out various massacres of mostly German POWs. The most infamous included the torture and murder of 160 wounded German soldiers in the massacre of Feodosia (1941-1942), and the 1943 torture, rape and murder of 596 Axis POWs and civilians in the massacre of Grischino. Estimates of German POWs who died in Soviet custody range from over 350,000 to 1.2 million. The mortality rate of German and Italian prisoners in Soviet custody was high, estimated at over 30% and over 70%, respectively. This was despite the USSR's public declarations of support for humane treatment of prisoners of war.

It is estimated that about 1.5 million Axis European POWs died after surrendering to the USSR.

== 1939–1941 ==
=== Legal framework ===
The tsarist government ratified the 1907 Hague Convention, but the Soviet Union had not signed the 1929 Geneva Convention on Prisoners of War. In 1931 USSR passed the "Statute of POWs" that was roughly similar to the Geneva Convention, although it explicitly outlawed many privileges customarily afforded to military officers.

=== Poland ===
While the Soviet Union did not consider itself engaged in World War II until Operation Barbarossa in 1941, already on 17 September 1939 it invaded Poland, alongside Germany, in accordance with the Molotov–Ribbentrop Pact. Neither Poland nor the Soviet Union actually declared war on one another, which made the status of Polish prisoners of war in Soviet custody somewhat unclear under international law, and facilitated Soviet classification of them as "counterrevolutionaries" rather than POWs.

The Soviets often failed to honor the terms of surrender. In some cases, they promised Polish soldiers freedom after capitulation and then arrested them when they laid down their arms; this happened to soldiers under command of Generals Władysław Langner and Mieczysław Smorawiński, among others. Soviet treatment of POWs included "reprisals such as torture, humiliation, robbery and killings through shooting or bayoneting". Some Polish soldiers were murdered shortly after capture in numerous incidents. The highest profile victims of Soviet atrocities of that period included General Józef Olszyna-Wilczyński, who was taken prisoner, interrogated and shot together with his adjutant on September 22. Around that time, the NKVD also executed about 300 Polish defenders taken captive after the battle of Grodno. On September 24, 25 Polish POWs were murdered in the aftermath of the Battle of Husynne. On September 25, the Soviets murdered staff and patients at a Polish military hospital in the village of Grabowiec near Zamość; Tadeusz Piotrowski mentions the death of 12 officers in this context. After a tactical Polish victory at the battle of Szack on September 28, where the combined Korpus Ochrony Pogranicza (KOP) or Border Protection Corps forces, under General Wilhelm Orlik-Rueckemann, routed the Soviet 52nd Rifle Division, the Soviets executed Polish officers they captured; 18 victims were identified. Also on 28 September 1939, 18 prisoners of war from the Riverine Flotilla of the Polish Navy were massacred in the Makrany massacre. Overall, it is estimated that during the invasion, approximately 2,500 Polish soldiers were murdered in various executions and reprisals for offering resistance, by Soviets and Ukrainian nationalists; officers were more likely to be murdered in such way than rank-and-file soldiers.

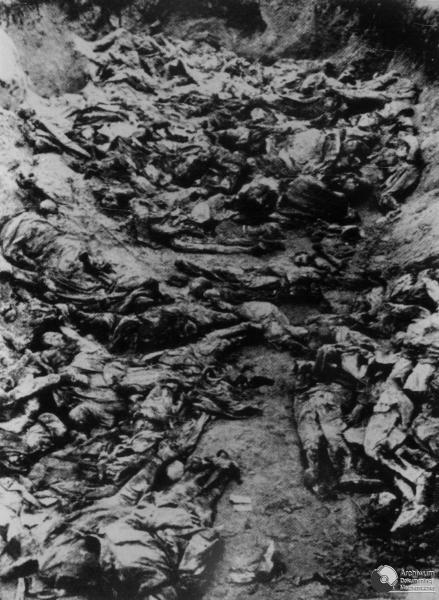
Mass grave of Polish officers in Katyn Forest, exhumed by Germany in 1943

Some lower ranking soldiers (privates and NCOs), about 60,000, were used as forced laborers before being eventually released. Some were transported to Soviet's Far East (Komi Republic). According to Edmund Nowak, they "were decimated... by inhumane treatment, extremely hard work conditions, cold, diseases and chronic hunger".

One of the Soviet Union's earliest and largest crimes against prisoners of war occurred in the aftermath of the invasion. After the fighting ended, the Soviet Union ended up with several hundred thousands of Polish prisoners of war. Some escaped, were transferred to German custody, or released, but 125,000 were imprisoned in camps run by the NKVD. By mid-November the number of Polish POWs in Soviet custody decreased to about 40,000. However, in December 1939, a wave of arrests resulted in the imprisonment of additional Polish officers (about a thousand). Once at the camps, from October 1939 to February 1940, the Poles were subjected to lengthy interrogations and constant political pressure to accept the dogma of communism and friendship of the Soviet Union. If a prisoner could not be induced to quickly adopt a pro-Soviet attitude, he was declared a "hardened and uncompromising enemy of Soviet authority". On 5 March 1940, the Soviet Politburo signed an order to execute over twenty thousand of Polish "nationalists and counterrevolutionaries" deemed unperformable (declared "avowed enemies of Soviet authority"), kept at camps and prisons in occupied western Ukraine and Belarus. The resulting massacre is known as the Katyn massacre, a series of mass executions of nearly 22,000 Polish intelligentsia, including about 8,000 military officers (mostly prisoners of war from the invasion of September 1939), carried out by the NKVD in April and May 1940. This was done to deprive a potential future Polish military of a large portion of its talent, and to reduce future opposition to the Soviet rule, and was part of a wider plan of oppression of Polish populace in the occupied territories.

Overall, the situation of Polish POWs in Soviet camps were much worse than those in German camps, even though most Polish POWs spent significantly less time in the former. Approximately 2-3% of Polish POWs in German camps died during the war; according to Nowak, "the mortality rate among the [Polish] POWs remaining in the Soviet captivity was much higher". For the officers, most of whom perished in the Katyn massacre, it was a stark 97%. A more general estimate for "mortality rate among deportees and POWs from 1939-1941" gave the odds at 20% for adults and 30% for the children. The mortality rate for the military enlisted has been estimated at 35% to 40%.

=== Baltic states ===
Soviets also committed atrocities against POWs from the armies of the Baltic states following their occupation of that territory in 1940. For example, two hundred Latvian officers were shot in Litene and 80 in Riga; and 560 were deported to Siberian gulags. Only 90 of them returned from Siberia after Joseph Stalin's death. 2,000 Lithuanian officers and 4,500 soldiers were kept in Soviet camps; most of them are estimated to have died there. In Yukhonovo Camp, about 1,000 Baltic officers were kept; the mortality rate in it was about 90%.

== After German invasion of the USSR (1941) ==
Shortly after the German invasion, Soviet Union revised its laws related to the treatment of POWs; one of the crucial changes was related to officially recognizing the NKVD as the organization in charge of the POWs in the USSR.

Throughout the Second World War, the Wehrmacht War Crimes Bureau (Wehrmacht-Untersuchungsstelle, also known as WuSt) collected and investigated reports of crimes against the Axis POWs. According to Alfred de Zayas, "For the entire duration of the Russian campaign, reports of torture and murder of German prisoners did not cease. The War Crimes Bureau had five major sources of information: (1) captured enemy papers, especially orders, reports of operations, and propaganda leaflets; (2) intercepted radio and wireless messages; (3) testimony of Soviet prisoners of war; (4) testimony of captured Germans who had escaped; and (5) testimony of Germans who saw the corpses or mutilated bodies of executed prisoners of war. From 1941 to 1945 the Bureau compiled several thousand depositions, reports, and captured papers which, if nothing else, indicate that the killing of German prisoners of war upon capture or shortly after their interrogation was not an isolated occurrence. Documents relating to the war in France, Italy, and North Africa contain some reports on the deliberate killing of German prisoners of war, but there can be no comparison with the events on the Eastern Front."

In a November 1941 report, the Wehrmacht War Crimes Bureau accused the Red Army of employing "a terror policy... against defenseless German soldiers that have fallen into its hands and against members of the German medical corps. At the same time... it has made use of the following means of camouflage: in a Red Army order that bears the approval of the Council of People's Commissars, dated 1 July 1941, the norms of international law are made public, which the Red Army in the spirit of the Hague Regulations on Land Warfare are supposed to follow... This... Russian order probably had very little distribution, and surely it has not been followed at all. Otherwise the unspeakable crimes would not have occurred."

According to the depositions, Soviet massacres of German, Italian, Spanish, and other Axis POWs were often incited by unit commissars, who claimed to be acting under orders from Stalin and the Politburo. Other evidence cemented the War Crimes Bureau's belief that Stalin had given secret orders about the massacre of POWs. Unlike with the execution of Polish POWs at Katyn, however, no such directive attributed to Stalin or top Soviet officials, concerning Germans, have been found. However, despite the non-existence of such order, many lower ranking officers and soldiers, encouraged by brutal and simplistic propaganda, believed it exists, or that the execution of German POWs is unofficially expected or sanctioned. In the early years of the war, the justification for such actions was provided by the Stalin's speech of November 6, 1941, in which Stalin said that "From now on our task, the task of the peoples of the U.S.S.R., the task of the fighters, commanders and the political workers of our Army and our Navy will be to exterminate every single German who has set his invading foot on the territory of our Fatherland. No mercy for the German invaders! Death to the German invaders!". Soon afterward, Soviet officials realized that such approach, leading to POW executions, was counterproductive, and reduced the chance of German soldiers surrendering; consequently, in February 1942, Stalin, in another speech, explicitly encouraged taking prisoners.

In the context of German POWs, Grunewald in a monograph dedicated to the topic argued that "economic realities... not retribution, motivated [Soviet] policies and practices toward German POWs, noting that Soviet treatment of German prisoners was not significantly motivated by retribution, despite the enormous scale of the German atrocities committed against Soviet prisoners of war. Grunewald also pointed out that Soviet authorities generally "did not respond by taking similar actions against their prisoners" and to a large extent followed the standards of the Geneva Convention (despite the USSR not being a signatory) by segregating officers from enlisted soldiers, exempting officers from labour and trying to give POWs rations equal to those of equivalent rank in their own army. Subsequently, in the forced labour system, the Soviets authorities even expended more resources on the well-being of foreign prisoners than they did on that of Soviet inmates, considering potential consequences for international public relations. Mark Edele noted that Soviet policy and actions towards German POWs in the early years of the war were inconsistent; and overall, "while Soviet war crimes cannot and should not be denied, they have more in common with prisoner executions in other times and places than with the Germans’ premeditated war of extermination" and "the murder and mutilation of prisoners by the Soviets was less common than [similar actions by the Germans]".

According to MacKenzie, many crimes committed by the Soviets against POWs were the result of intensive propaganda that portrayed Germans as not humans (here, mirroring similar German propaganda). He noted that the situation of German and other Axis POWs improved in the later years of the war, as Soviets started to integrate them more efficiently (and purposively) into the economy of USSR as forced laborers. The conditions for those POWs, however, were very hash; deaths from starvation, disease or freezing conditions were common.

Soviet sources list the deaths of 381,000 of the 3,350,000 German Armed Forces taken prisoner in the war; some German estimates however are higher, suggesting a death toll of as high as one million (when accounting for German MIAs, which some scholars, like Rüdiger Overmans, believe to be undocumented POWs death). Valerie Genevieve Hébert noted that "The general consensus regarding the fate of German prisoners of war under Soviet control is that of 3.15 million taken, 1.2 million died, mainly after January 1943".

The death rate of German soldiers held by Soviet Union has been estimated at 15% by Mark Edele, and at 35.8% by Niall Ferguson. An even higher estimate of death rate has been suggested for the Italian soldiers held by the Soviet Union: 79% (estimate by Thomas Schlemmer) or 56.5%. High mortality rates have also been given for Romanian (29%) and Hungarian (10.6%) soldiers held by the USSR. The high mortality rate of the Italians has been attributed to the fact that they have been captured in the middle of the harsh winter, with little winter equipment, and the Soviets with few resources to spare for POWs; tens of thousands are assumed to have frozen or died from disease and starvation shortly after capture.

After World War II Japanese personnel in the Soviet Union and Mongolia were interned to work in labor camps as POWs. Estimates for their number vary, from 560,000–760,000 to 900,000. Of them, it is estimated that between 60,000, to 200,000-300,000 died in captivity.

=== Notable incidents ===
==== Massacre of Feodosia ====
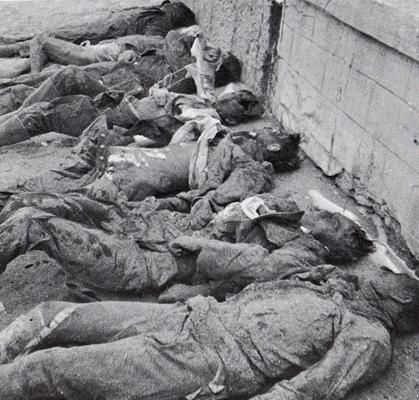
Corpses from the Massacre of Feodosia in front of the main hospital on the coast

Soviet soldiers rarely bothered to treat wounded German POWs. A particularly infamous example took place after the Crimean city of Feodosia was briefly recaptured by Soviet forces on December 29, 1941. The retreating Wehrmacht left 160 wounded soldiers in military hospitals. After the Germans retook Feodosia, it was learned that every wounded soldier had been massacred by Red Army, Navy, and NKVD personnel. Some had been shot in their hospital beds, others repeatedly bludgeoned to death, still others were found to have been thrown from hospital windows before being repeatedly drenched with freezing water until they died of hypothermia.

==== Massacre of Grishchino ====
The Massacre of Grischino was committed by an armoured division of the Red Army in February 1943 (Soviet 4th Guards Tank Corps) in the eastern Ukrainian town of Krasnoarmeyskoye (also known as Grishchino). The Soviets took control of the location on the night of 10 and 11 February 1943, but were pushed back by the German 5th SS Panzer Division Wiking with the support of 333 Infantry Division and the 7th Panzer Division on 18 February 1943 .The Wehrmacht War Crimes Bureau announced that it had found the bodies of numerous POWs; many subject to gruesome torture: many of the bodies were horribly mutilated, ears and noses cut off and genital organs amputated and stuffed into their mouths. Breasts of some of the nurses were cut off, the women being brutally raped. In the cellar of the main train station around 120 Germans were herded into a large storage room and then mowed down with machine guns. Among the dead were 406 soldiers of the Wehrmacht, 58 members of the Organisation Todt (including two Danish nationals), 89 Italian soldiers, 9 Romanian soldiers, 4 Hungarian soldiers, 15 German civil officials, 7 German civilian workers and 8 Ukrainian volunteers.

== Postwar ==
Some German and Japanese prisoners were released soon after the war. Many others, however, remained in the GULAG long after the surrender of their countries; the last groups of German and Japanese POWs were repatriated to their home countries from USSR only in 1956.

In addition to mistreatment of enemy POWs, contemporary Soviet leaders, including Stalin, considered Soviet soldiers who surrendered to be traitors. Moore noted that "Moscow’s attitude towards any soldier falling into enemy hands... had been brutal in the extreme." Early in the war, in August 1941, Soviets issued the Order No. 270, which categorized all those taken prisoner as malicious deserters subject to summary execution upon recapture; 10,000 were executed in the first months of the war alone. MacKenzie noted that "those who survived German captivity to 1945 were promptly sent to the Gulag", although Moore noted that only about 17% of the returnees suffered that fate; while similar numbers ended up in penal battalions. The remainder suffered from various discriminations; including some (about 6% of the total repatriated Soviet citizens, civilians and POW, who were "transferred to the NKVD ‘for disposal’". Most were forced to settle in remote regions, subject to regular controls, and denied compensation payments (even after the fall of the Soviet Union), common in most other countries. Similar mistreatment faced Soviet prisoners of war returning from Finland.

== Historiography ==
Research into Soviet crimes against POWs was hampered due to public condemnation of the Nazi regime, and the fact that discredited Nazi propaganda for many years made claims about related Soviet atrocities, which also led to the "propagandist contamination" of German records. Although such claims eventually became accepted in German and Western historiographies, in particular, as noted by Mark Edele, in the Soviet Union, "Any claim that the glorious Red Army might have committed war crimes was dismissed as slanderous enemy propaganda". Denial that such crimes occurred is still not uncommon in modern Russia, where the issue has remained politically controversial, and research on this topic in Russia is difficult. Edele noted that as of mid-2010s, the Central Archives of the Russian Ministry of Defence still "remains closed for this kind of research".

== Relationship with Soviet official statements ==
While the Soviet Union had not signed the 1929 Geneva Convention on Prisoners of War, Soviet officials claimed early in the war that they intended to respect the 1907 Hague Convention, ratified by the tsarist government; and official Soviet regulations on the treatment of POWs were in line with the Hague principles. However, scholars noted that the Soviet Union, while publicly declaring its support for humane treatment of POWs, routinely ignored them, committing various atrocities. Pavel Polian observed that different decrees were intended by propaganda for dissemination to the international community, and others were implemented in practice. George Sanford wrote that Soviet public declarations and laws on concerning POWs were "part of the Soviet 'big lie' for propaganda". Charles Rollings noted that USSR, together with the Axis powers, "ignored [Geneva] provisions to a great or lesser degree". Likewise, Simon MacKenzie noted that "[Soviet] declared commitment to humanitarian principles [in the context of treatment of prisoners of war], however, was largely for foreign propaganda purposes" Susan Grunewald likewise noted that Soviet officials "recognized that intentionally retributive treatment of German POWs would be an international relations disaster" and would clash with Soviet propaganda portraying USSR as a "peace loving country", particularly in the later years of the war and the early Cold War period. However, unlike the other authors cited above, she adduced that motive as an explanation of genuine efforts on the part of the USSR to treat German prisoners well.

The Soviet treatment of Finnish prisoners of war in the Soviet Union has been described as an exception to that country treatment of Axis-aligned soldiers; they have been treated better than the Germans or Italians, and repatriated promptly after the war ended.

== See also ==
- Allied war crimes during World War II
- Atrocity crimes during the Russo-Ukrainian War
- Cursed soldiers
- German atrocities committed against Soviet prisoners of war
- NKVD prisoner massacres
- Polish prisoners and internees in Soviet Russia and Lithuania (1919–1921)
- Prisoners of war in World War II
- Soviet war crimes
- Wilm Hosenfeld
