= List of massacres in Belarus =

The following is a partial list of selected massacres that are known to have occurred in the territory of modern-day Belarus (some numbers may be approximated):

Name	Date	Location	Perpetrators	Deaths	Notes
Pripet Marshes massacres (1654)	c. September 1654	Pripet Marshes	Cossacks	Thousands	Ivan Zolotarenko's Cossacks of Nizhyn Regiment massacred thousands of Polish civilians in the Pripet Marshes.
Pinsk massacre	April 5, 1919	Pinsk	(Second Polish Republic) Poland	35	Jewish men from illegal gathering of suspected Bolshevik cell executed by Polish troops during Polish–Soviet War.
Kurapaty massacres	1937–1941	Kurapaty (Minsk)	Soviet Union	7,000–30,000	NKVD summary executions
Massacre of Brzostowica Mała	September 1939	Brzostowica Mała, occupied Poland (Malaya Byerastavitsa)	Belarusian peasants	50	Poles massacred by Belarusian peasants on the second day of the Soviet invasion of Poland.
Mokrany massacre	September 28, 1939	Mokrany, occupied Poland	Soviet Union	18	Polish POWs massacred by Soviet forces.
1941 Oszmiana massacre	July 26, 1941	Oszmiana, occupied Poland (Ashmyany)	Nazi Germany	527	Massacre of Jews committed by Nazi German occupiers as part of the Holocaust.
Pripet Marshes massacres (1941)	28 July – 29 August 1941	Pripet Marshes	Nazi Germany	17,288	Massacres of Jews and Soviet civilians committed by Nazi German occupiers as part of the Holocaust.
Slutsk Affair	October 1941	Slutsk	Nazi Germany	4,000	Part of the Holocaust in Belarus; non-Jewish residents also killed
Misznowszyna Forest massacre	October 20–21, 1941	Misznowszyna Forest near Horodyszcze, occupied Poland (Haradzishcha)	Nazi Germany	1,000+	Massacre of Jews committed by Nazi German occupiers as part of the Holocaust.
Kleck massacres of 1941	October 25 and 30, 1941	Kleck, occupied Poland (Klyetsk)	Nazi Germany	~3,800	Massacre of Jews committed by Nazi German occupiers as part of the Holocaust.
Nieśwież massacre	October 30, 1941	Nieśwież, occupied Poland (Nyasvizh)	Nazi Germany	~4,000	Massacre of Jews committed by Nazi German occupiers as part of the Holocaust.
Siniawka massacre	autumn of 1941 and summer of 1942	Siniawka, occupied Poland (Sinyawka)	Nazi Germany	~730	Massacre of Jews committed by Nazi German occupiers as part of the Holocaust.
Babruysk massacre	November 9, 1941	Babruysk	Nazi Germany	1,700	Soviet POWs massacred by soldiers of the German 339th Infantry Division.
Ilja massacres	March 17 and June 7, 1942	Ilja, occupied Poland (Ilya)	Nazi Germany	650–850	Massacre of Jews committed by Nazi German occupiers as part of the Holocaust.
Dołhinów massacre	March 30, 1942	Dołhinów, occupied Poland (Dawhinava)	Nazi Germany	~1,000	Massacre of Jews committed by Nazi German occupiers as part of the Holocaust.
Dzyatlava massacre	April 29 and August 10, 1942	Zdzięcioł, occupied Poland (Dzyatlava)	Schutzstaffel; Belarusian Auxiliary Police	1,500	Carried out by the SS and Belarusian Auxiliary Police.
Bronna Góra massacre	May 1942 – November 1942	Bronna Góra, occupied Poland	Schutzstaffel	50,000	Mass killings by Schutzstaffel (SS) and SS-Totenkopfverbände (SS-TV) over execution pits dug in the forest
Łużki massacre	June 1, 1942	Łużki, occupied Poland (Luzhki)	Nazi Germany	528	Massacre of Jews committed by Nazi German occupiers as part of the Holocaust.
Iwieniec massacre	June 9, 1942	Iwieniec, occupied Poland (Ivyanyets)	Nazi Germany	~800	Massacre of Jews committed by Nazi German occupiers as part of the Holocaust.
Druja massacre	June 17, 1942	Druja, occupied Poland (Druya)	Nazi Germany	1,000+	Massacre of Jews committed by Nazi German occupiers as part of the Holocaust.
Marków massacre	June 24, 1942	Marków, occupied Poland (Markava)	Nazi Germany	500+	Massacre of Jews committed by Nazi German occupiers as part of the Holocaust.
Horodziej massacre	July 16, 1942	Horodziej, occupied Poland (Haradzyeya)	Nazi Germany	~1,000	Massacre of Jews committed by Nazi German occupiers as part of the Holocaust.
1942 Kleck massacre	July 22, 1942	Kleck, occupied Poland (Klyetsk)	Nazi Germany	~1,400	Massacre of Jews committed by Nazi German occupiers as part of the Holocaust.
Mereczowszczyzna massacre	July 24–25, 1942	Mereczowszczyzna, occupied Poland (Myerachowshchyna)	Nazi Germany	~1,200	Massacre of Jews committed by Nazi German occupiers as part of the Holocaust.
Lenin massacre	August 14, 1942	Lenin, occupied Poland	Nazi Germany	28	Massacre of nearly all Jewish residents committed by Nazi German occupiers as part of the Holocaust.
Oszmiana massacre of 1942	October 23, 1942	Oszmiana, occupied Poland (Ashmyany)	Nazi Germany	406	Massacre of elderly Jews committed by Nazi German occupiers as part of the Holocaust.
Duniłowicze massacre	November 21–22, 1942	Duniłowicze, occupied Poland (Dunilavichy)	Nazi Germany	826	Massacre of Jews committed by Nazi German occupiers as part of the Holocaust.
Mirnaya massacre	December 1942	Mirnaya (Мірная), Belarus (be)	Nazi Germany	147	Nazi retribution for partisan attacks
Lyubozhanka massacre	January 8, 1943	Lyubozhanka, Dzyarzhynsk district, Minsk region	Nazi Germany	42	Nazi forces unexpectedly invaded the village. They invaded the houses and shot anyone who tried to escape, They pursued them with German Shepherds. Immediately, they set fire to houses and other buildings. According to the official version, 42 villagers were killed, including 14 children.
Khatyn massacre	March 22, 1943	Khatyn	Ukrainian Auxiliary Police; Dirlewanger Brigade	149	Troops from the Ukrainian Auxiliary Police and Dirlewanger Brigade destroyed the entire village in retribution for Soviet partisan attack (not to be confused with Katyn massacre).
Operation Zauberflöte	17−22 April 1943	Minsk	Nazi Germany	Unknown	
Naliboki massacre	May 8, 1943	Naliboki, occupied Poland	Soviet partisans	128	Polish civilians massacred by the Soviet partisans.
Operation Cottbus	20 May – 24 June 1943	Vitebsk Oblast	Nazi Germany	20,000+	Estimated at least 20,000 victims at the cost of 59 German troops killed in action
Martyrs of Nowogródek execution	1 August 1943	Novogrudok	Gestapo	11	11 Sisters of the Holy Family of Nazareth executed by the Gestapo
Mashchanitsa affair	31 May - 1 June 2005	Vyalikaya Mashchanitsa, Mogilev Oblast	Mikalai Rakutin, Syarhei Yushkevich, Pavel Pavlyuchenko, Gennady Salauyev (sentenced)	6	Burglary in the house
2011 Minsk Metro bombing	April 11, 2011	Minsk	Dzmitry Kanavalau, Uladzislau Kavalyou	15	Including 204 injured
Stowbtsy School stabbing	February 11, 2019	Stowbtsy	Vadim Miloshevsky	2	2 wounded
