= List of terrorist incidents in 1990 =

This is a timeline of incidents in 1990 that have been labelled as "terrorism" and are not believed to have been carried out by a government or its forces (see state terrorism and state-sponsored terrorism).

== Guidelines ==
- To be included, entries must be notable (have a stand-alone article) and described by a consensus of reliable sources as "terrorism".
- List entries must comply with the guidelines outlined in the manual of style under MOS:TERRORIST.
- Casualty figures in this list are the total casualties of the incident including immediate casualties and later casualties (such as people who succumbed to their wounds long after the attacks occurred).
- Casualties listed are the victims. Perpetrator casualties are listed separately (e.g. x (+y) indicate that x victims and y perpetrators were killed/injured).
- Casualty totals may be underestimated or unavailable due to a lack of information. A figure with a plus (+) sign indicates that at least that many people have died (e.g. 10+ indicates that at least 10 people have died) – the actual toll could be considerably higher. A figure with a plus (+) sign may also indicate that over that number of people are victims.
- If casualty figures are 20 or more, they will be shown in **bold**. In addition, figures for casualties more than 50 will also be **underlined**.
- Incidents are limited to one per location per day. If multiple attacks occur in the same place on the same day, they will be merged into a single incident.
- In addition to the guidelines above, the table also includes the following categories:

0 people were killed/injured by the incident.
1–19 people were killed/injured by the incident.
20–49 people were killed/injured by the incident.
50–99 people were killed/injured by the incident.
100+ people were killed/injured by the incident.

== List ==
| Date | Type | Dead | Injured | Location | Details | Perpetrator | Part of |
|---|---|---|---|---|---|---|---|
| January 29 | Prison break | 0 | 0 | Santiago, Chile | 49 political prisoners of the FPMR escape the state jail through a tunnel in the largest prison break in Chilean history. | Manuel Rodríguez Patriotic Front | Armed resistance in Chile (1973-1990) |
| February 9 | Shooting | 1 | 4 | Santiago, Chile | A policeman was shot dead and four others badly injured during an attack on two police headquarters in the San Ramon district. Two vehicles carrying four militants each arrived at both Carabineros de Chile and Investigation's Police buildings that were in front of each other. At about 10:00 PM, a men came out of one of the cars with a LAW rocket launcher firing it against the Carabineros building and the three others fired automatic guns at the building, meanwhile from the other car the rest of the team fired at the Investigation's office. One Carabinero was killed and 4 others officers wounded. A so called "Arturo Villabella Commando" of the Revolutionary Left Movement (named after a rebel leader killed by police in 1983) took credit for the attack. | Revolutionary Left Movement | Armed resistance in Chile (1973-1990) |
| February 22 | Shooting | 7 | 3 (+14 Kidnapped) | Segovia, Colombia | FARC militants attack a mobile patrol post of the Bombona Battalion in Antioquia Department. Seven soldiers die and 14 more are kidnapped. | FARC Militants | Colombian conflict |
| February 27 | Shooting | 0 | 0 | Santiago, Chile | At 10:00 PM, a passing car carrying four men armed with M16 rifles and a Light Antitank Weapon rocket launcher arrived at the 2nd Military Court in Santiago. The men sprayed the building with rifle fire and finally launched a rocket at the entrance destroying windows and the main door. Hours later an anonymous call calling itself a member of the Lautaro Youth Movement claimed responsibility for the attack in protest for the recent jailing of MJL members for gun possession, armed robbery and murder of policemen. | Lautaro Youth Movement | Armed resistance in Chile (1973-1990) |
| March 3 | Shooting | 43 | Unknown | Trujillo, Colombia | A series of massacres occurred between 1986 and 1994. That day a number of 43 people died. | FARC militants | Colombian conflict |
| March 21 | Assassination attempt | 0 | 2 | Santiago, Chile | Retired Air Force general Gustavo Leigh and another retired Air Force official were shot at their office by two assailants with pistols just 10 days after the new democratic government assumed. Leigh was one of the four army generals that led the 1973 coup that started the military regime. Leigh and his companion survived but Leigh lost an eye. | Manuel Rodríguez Patriotic Front | Armed resistance in Chile (1973-1990) |
| March 22 | Assassination | 1 | 0 | Bogotá, Colombia | Senator and presidential candidateBernardo Jaramillo Ossa was killed on a bridge when he was preparing to travel to Santa Marta. Fidel and Carlos Castaño ordered the crime | Peasant Self-Defenders of Córdoba and Urabá or Los Pepes | Colombian conflict |
| March 28 | Ambush | 0 | 2 | Talcahuano, Chile | A Carabineros patrol in the southern city of Talcahuano making its routine route was attacked with automatic rifles. The two policemen inside were badly injured and their guns stolen. Shortly after, the MJL (Lautaro Youth Movement) claimed responsibility. | Lautaro Youth Movement | Armed resistance in Chile (1973-1990) |
| March 29 | Ambush | 7 | Unknown | Trujillo, Colombia | ELN members ambush and kill 7 soldiers in the village of La Sonora. | ELN | Colombian conflict |
| March 30 – April 17 | Massacre | 30 | Unknown | Trujillo, Colombia | Valle del Norte cartel members supported by elements of the Army, disappear and kill about 30 civilians in reprisal for guerrilla attacks. | Northern Valle cartel and Colombian army | Colombian conflict |
| April 9 | Shooting | 6 (+8) | 8 | Norte de Santander, Colombia | 120 ELN insurgents are taken to San Calixto. In the fighting 6 policemen and 8 guerrillas die. | ELN | Colombian conflict |
| April 26 | Assassination | 1 | 0 | Bogotá, Colombia | Presidential candidate Carlos Pizarro Leongómez is assassinated on board a plane. | Medellín cartel (suspected) | Colombian conflict |
| May 7 | Car bombing | 1 | 5 | Pereira, Colombia | A car bomb kills one and injures five outside a government building. No group claims responsibility but the government blames drug lords who declared war on the country nine months earlier. | Medellín Cartel (suspected) | Colombian conflict |
| May 10 | Assassination | 1 | 1 | Santiago, Chile | 2 radicals disguised as high school students shot retired Carabineros colonel Luis Fontaine dead 18 times as he was riding a taxi cab. During the shooting, a 19 year old girl was shot in the stomach but survived. Fontaine was a top police agent during the dictatorship that was involved with numerous murders including the gruesome throat cutting death of 3 communist militants in 1985. | Manuel Rodríguez Patriotic Front | Armed resistance in Chile (1973-1990) |
| May 12 | Car bombings | 26 | 180 | Bogotá, Colombia | Two car bombs explode simultaneously in the Quirigua and Niza shopping malls during Mother's Day killing 19, including six children, and wounding 140, while another bomb exploded in a restaurant in Cali, killing six and injuring 20. Authorities said the Medellín Cartel was to blame. | Medellín Cartel | Colombian conflict |
| May 14 | Bombings | 0 | 0 | Santiago, Chile | Three explosions occurred but no casualties were reported. The group Comando 14 de Diciembre claimed responsibility for the attack and has not been heard of since. Its targets suggest that this was an isolationist group that did not want foreigners operating in Chile. | Comando 14 de Diciembre | Armed resistance in Chile (1973–1990) |
| May 14 | Bombing | 0 | 1 | Santiago, Chile | The US Consulate placed in the wealthy district of Las Condes was attacked with two explosive devices in the morning hours. During that time, two well dressed individuals were seen carrying suitcases in the nearby area. By around 9:00 AM, the two individuals trowed the two suitcase (filled with dynamite) into the Consulate parking lot. One of the exploded in the air not causing damage or injuries, while the other one fell upon a car totally destroying it and causing damage to the machines around and injured a security guard. Hours later, local radio stations received various phone calls by the Manuel Rodríguez Front claiming responsibility. | Manuel Rodríguez Patriotic Front | Armed resistance in Chile (1973-1990) |
| May 16 | Bombing | 1 | 4 | London, United Kingdom | The IRA detonate a bomb under a military minibus, killing Sgt Charles Chapman, and injuring four other soldiers. | PIRA | The Troubles |
| May 24 | Shooting, Bombing, Looting | 0 | 0 | Santiago, Chile | A group of Lautaristas (MJL members) fired a rocket launcher and machine guns on a Carabineros station of the La Florida district causing no casualties. Meanwhile, another MJL group entered the La Florida Mall Plaza, disarmed the security guards and looted the whole Mall, ransacking electronics, clothing, toys and drug stores to be delivered to the slums nearby. | Lautaro Youth Movement | Armed resistance in Chile (1973-1990) |
| May 25 | Ambush, Shooting | 8 (+6) | 12 (+2 kidnapped) | San Vicente, Colombia | ELN guerrillas ambush a convoy of the National Police. 8 agents and 6 guerrillas die. 4 officers and 8 agents were injured, another two were kidnapped. | ELN | Colombian conflict |
| June 4 | Bombing | 1 | 1 | Santiago, Chile | A Carabineros explosive expert was killed and other badly injured when they try and failed to deactivate a high powered bomb on the National Treasure building meters away from the presidential palace. | Manuel Rodríguez Patriotic Front | Armed resistance in Chile (1973-1990) |
| June 11 | Massacre | 600–774 | | Eastern Province, Sri Lanka | Over 600 unarmed police officers are shot dead by the LTTE in several Police Stations. | LTTE | Sri Lankan Civil War |
| June 18 | Assassination | 1 | 0 | Chillan, Chile | In the early hours, Marques Rodolfo Echeverría, former member of the Carabineros intelligence branch and participant in a number of political murders and disappearances against leftist during the 1970s was gunned down near his home in the southern city of Chillan. Numerous groups took responsibility for the attack, but suspicion fell on the Revolutionary Left Movement because of the group already made an attempt on his life one year earlier in which he and his daughter survived injury and also killed one of his attackers. | Revolutionary Left Movement (suspected) | Armed resistance in Chile (1973-1990) |
| June 29 | Shooting | 0 | 0 | Panama City, Panama | Militants of the M-20 movement shoot eight bullets of 9mm weapon struck the U.S embassy | 20 December Movement (M-20) | Terrorism in Panama |
| July 20 | Bombing | 0 | 0 | London, United Kingdom | The IRA detonate a bomb at the London Stock Exchange causing damage to the building. Nobody was injured. | PIRA | The Troubles |
| July 30 | Assassination, bombing | 1 | 0 | Pevensey, United Kingdom | Conservative MP Ian Gow is killed by a bomb planted under his car by the PIRA. | PIRA | The Troubles |
| August 3 | Massacre | 147 | | Kattankudy, Sri Lanka | Over 30 Tamil Tiger cadres attacked four Muslim mosques in Batticaloa district, killing at least 147 Muslims who were praying inside. | LTTE | Sri Lankan Civil War |
| August 10 | Bombing | 15–20 | 16–30 | Khanlar, Azerbaijan | A bus carrying about 60 passengers from Georgia's capital Tbilisi to Aghdam in Azerbaijan is bombed in Khanlar (now Goygol). The bombing was carried out by two ethnic Armenians named Armen Avanesyan and Mikhail Tatevosov, who were members of Vrezh, an underground militant anti-Azerbaijan group operated out of Rostov-on-Don. | Vrezh | |
| August 10 | Shooting, Ambush | 2 (+1) | 0 | Santiago, Chile | A Carabineros bus making his routine route was ambushed with automatic weapons in the district of La Florida. Two policemen lost their lives and one assailant died with a shot in the head. | Lautaro Youth Movement | Armed resistance in Chile (1973-1990) |
| October 11 | Ambush, Shooting | 4 | 14 kidnapped | Carchi Province, Ecuador | ARC guerrillas ambush Ecuadorian troops in the region of the San Miguel river El Azul between Titizga and Tetete. The patrol of 24 soldiers assigned to the Brigade of Jungle N 56, is annihilated. The result is four soldiers killed and 14 kidnapped, including the major who commanded the unit. | FARC Militants | Colombian conflict |
| October 24 | Bombing | 7 | 14 | Northern Ireland | The Provisional Irish Republican Army (PIRA) launched three "proxy bombs" or "human bombs" at British Army checkpoints. Three men (who were or had been working with the British Army) were tied into cars loaded with explosives and ordered to drive to each checkpoint. Each bomb was detonated by remote control. The first exploded at a checkpoint in Coshquin, killing the driver and five soldiers. The second exploded at a checkpoint in Killeen, County Armagh; the driver narrowly escaped, albeit suffered a broken leg but one soldier was killed and 23 other soldiers were wounded. The third failed to detonate. | PIRA | The Troubles |
| October 26 | Assassination | 1 | 0 | Santiago, Chile | Víctor Valenzuela Montecinos, former member of Chilean intelligence police and ex bodyguard of Augusto Pinochet was killed with 5 shots to his body. | Manuel Rodríguez Patriotic Front | Armed resistance in Chile (1973-1990) |
| October 31 | Bombing | 0 | 8 | Viña del Mar, Chile | A medium powered device was planted in a German food restaurant full with foreigners including US Navy personnel in the sea side city of Viña del Mar. The device detonated by midnight injuring three US sailors, two waitresses and three british tourists (one seriously wounded). No group claimed responsibility, but police sources blamed the Manuel Rodríguez Patriotic Front, group responsible for a series of bombs, assassinations and robberies in the past months. | Unknown | Armed resistance in Chile (1973-1990) |
| November 5 | Assassination | 1 | 0 | Santiago, Chile | On the late hours of November 5th, army major and intelligence agent Manuel Flores Gallardo was driving home along with his mistress in La Reina district. When the traffic light turn red and the car stopped, three hooded men with guns on their hands forced him out of the car and immediately fired killing him instantly. Hours later, an anonymous call attributed the attack on the Manuel Rodríguez Patriotic Front. Despite this, numerous conspiracy theories have attributed the shooting to a rogue faction of the Army's Intelligence Department because of the Major's efforts to uncover a pyramid scheme inside the armed forces. | Manuel Rodríguez Patriotic Front (alleged) | Armed resistance in Chile (1973-1990) |
| November 5 | assassination | 1 | 2 (+1) | New York, United States | Assassination of Meir Kahane: Far-right American-Israeli politician Meir Kahane was shot and killed while a bystander was shot in the leg by Egyptian Islamist El Sayyid Nosair at the Marriott hotel. A police officer was wounded in the arrest of Nosair, who himself was also injured in the ensuing shootout. | El Sayyid Nosair | Terrorism in the United States |
| November 15 | Shooting, Ambush, Rescue | 5 (+1) | 0 (+1) | Santiago, Chile | An armed commando from the MJL (Lautaro Youth Movement) entered the Sotero del Río hospital in the Puente Alto district to rescue Marco Ariel Antonioletti. Antonioletti was serving time in prison because of his involvement in the murder of 3 Carabineros and was taken to the hospital because of his vision problem. Because of his sentence, Antonioletti was guarded by dozens of heavily armed prison guards and policemen, so the MJL members enter firing at the officers and caused huge mayhem. During the shooting, 4 prison guards and 1 Carabinero were killed, also, 1 female MJL member (a woman nicknamed "La Mujer Metralleta" or "the Machine Gun Woman" because of his involvement in various bank robberies) was shot in the back, she survived but with a critical back problem. The MJL successfully rescued Antonioletti and took him to an Estación Central safe house, but later that night, police raided the safe house and Antonioletti was killed with a single shot in the head. | Lautaro Youth Movement | Armed resistance in Chile (1973-1990) |
| November 17 | Bombing, attempted assassination | 1 | 3 | Santiago, Chile | During a baseball tournament for North American citizens, a baseball bat with dynamite stick to it detonated during a match, killing one and injuring other three. Later it was found that the bomb was directed to Tom Collins, at the time US embassy security agent. Collins survived but with serious injuries, meanwhile a Canadian fruit exporter died because of his injuries. Hours later, an anonymous call to a local radio told that the attack was made by the PLO, but quickly the FPMR took responsibility for the attack. | Manuel Rodríguez Patriotic Front | Armed resistance in Chile (1973-1990) |
| December 8 | Bombing | 6 | 10 | Sabadell, Spain | ETA bombs a police convoy that was on its way to police a football match. | ETA | Basque conflict |
| December 13 | Bombing | 7 | 23 | Medellín, Colombia | A remote control bomb kills seven police officers and injures 23 more. Authorities blame the Medellín Cartel for the attack. | Medellín Cartel | |

== See also ==
- List of terrorist incidents
