= Gorodishche Ghetto =

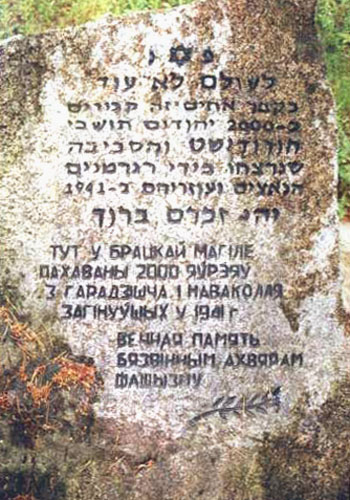
- Ghetto Gorodische
- Location: Gorodishche
- Date: summer 1941 - October 21 1941

Gorodishche Ghetto (summer 1941 - October 21 1941) was a Nazi Jewish ghetto established for the forced relocation of Jews from the village of Gorodishche (Today Haradzishcha) in the Baranovichi district of the Brest region and nearby settlements. This occurred during the persecution and extermination of Jews under the Nazi occupation of Belarus during World War II.

== Occupation of Gorodishche and the creation of the ghetto ==
According to data from 1921, 760 Jews lived in the town of Gorodishche. Until September 1939, the village was part of the Polesie Voivodeship of Poland. After the annexation of eastern Poland by the USSR, it became part of the Baranovichi region. As of August 21, 1940, there were 1,337 refugees from the German-occupied part of Poland in Gorodishche. German troops occupied Gorodishche from June 24, 1941, to July 8, 1944. On June 27, 1941, 17 or 18 Jews were shot by the Nazis, including two families of the Tsirinskys. Soon after, the Germans, implementing Hitler's program of exterminating Jews, organized a ghetto in the town. The ghetto in Gorodishche was located on Slonimsky Lane.

== Destruction of the ghetto ==
On October 20, 1941, an SS team arrived in Gorodishche. Jewish specialists (68 people) were left in the ghetto, while the remaining 100-150 adult men were taken two kilometers from the town to the Pogoreltsy tract and the Mikhnovshchina forest. They were forced to dig pits and were immediately shot there. The next day, October 21, 1941, between 1,200 and 1,440 Jews from Gorodishche were shot at these pits. Some of their names are known: barber Yelin, the Krasilshchikov brothers, and the 105-year-old rabbi Mordukhovich.

On the same day, in the Mikhnovshchina forest, the Germans killed another 70 (68) Jews from the intelligentsia. Subsequently, Jews from nearby villages and some Roma were brought to the ghetto. The next "action" (used by the Nazis for mass murders) was carried out in early May 1942, when 35 Jews were shot near the Orthodox cemetery. In August 1942, about 100 more Jewish specialists were shot there.

In the summer of 1942, a Jewish woman with two children, was shot near the church. In total, 3,830 Jews were killed in Gorodishche and the surrounding area (and in total, considering victims of other nationalities, about 4,000 people).

== Memory ==
The Extraordinary State Commission for Ascertaining and Investigating the Crimes Committed by the German–Fascist Invaders and Their Accomplices, discovered several mass graves in Gorodishche. One was located in the Pogoreltsy tract forest, two kilometers southeast of the town along the Gorodishche-Baranovichi road on the left side, 200 meters from the highway. There, on October 21 and 22, 1941, the Germans shot 154 Jews. The second grave was 300 meters near the Orthodox church. In 1994, memorial signs were installed near the Orthodox cemetery in Gorodishche and in the Pogoreltsy tract to honor the victims of the genocide of Jews.
