= Malaya Berestavitsa massacre =

- Part of Soviet Invasion of Poland and Polish-Belarusian ethnic conflict
- Native name: Zbrodnia w Brzostowicy Małej
- Location: Malaya Byerastavitsa, Grodno County
- Date: September 1939
- Deaths: 8
- Victim: Poles
- Perpetrators: Pro-communist militia mainly made up of Jews and Belarusians
- Accused: Ajzik Zusko, Sergei Koziejko

The Malaya Berestavitsa massacre (Polish: Zbrodnia w Brzostowicy Małej; Belarusian: Злачынства ў Малой Бераставіцы) happened in middle of September 1939 in the village of Malaya Byerastavitsa, during the Soviet Invasion of Poland. During that event, eight Polish villagers were murdered by pro-communist militia mainly made up of Jews and Belarusians.

== Historiography ==
The massacre in Malaya Berestavitsa was first described by Krzysztof Jasiewicz in the study Lista strat ziemiaństwa polskiego 1939–1956 (List of losses of Polish landowners 1939-1956) published in 1995. Later it was discussed by Ryszard Szawłowski in his book Wojna polsko-sowiecka 1939 (Polish-Soviet War 1939) (1997) and Marek Wierzbicki in his book Polacy i Białorusini w zaborze sowieckim. Stosunki polsko-białoruskie na ziemiach północno-wschodnich II Rzeczypospolitej pod okupacją sowiecką 1939–1941 (Poles and Belarusians in the Soviet Annexation. Polish-Byelorussian Relations in the North-Eastern Lands of the Second Polish Republic under Soviet Occupation 1939-1941) published in 2000. (Note: In doing so, the latter relied both on Jasiewicz's study and on the unpublished memoirs of Józef Apoznański entitled Krwawe wspomnienia skrzywdzonego polskiego emigranta (typescript in the collection of the Polish Institute and the General Sikorski Museum in London))

== The massacre ==
The exact date of the massacre is unknown. Jasiewicz states that it took place on the night of 17–18 September, i.e. only a dozen hours after the USSR's aggression against Poland. Other sources indicate that it was committed after the Red Army had already occupied the territory of the Indura County, i.e. between 19 and 20 of September. The perpetrators were allegedly members of a pro-communist militia made up of Jews and Belarusians, most of them former political and criminal prisoners. It was to be headed by Ajzik Zusko, a Jewish trader living on the Wołkowicki family's land estate, and a Belarusian criminal, Sergei Koziejko.

According to the account quoted by Wierzbicki in his book, the militia first attacked the Wołkowicki family mansion and the Polish offices in Malaya Berestavitsa. A number of Poles were detained and sent to the local prison. To celebrate their "success", the attackers drank alcohol. In the morning the drunken militiamen dragged the Poles out of the prison, with the paralysed Countess Wolkowicka being dragged out by her hair. After being tortured, the victims were murdered. Some were shot. Others - including the Countess in particular, who loudly threatened the torturers with trial and punishment - were forced to swallow lime. Many of the wounded victims were buried alive in a mass grave. The course of the murder was so cruel that one of the Belarusians standing guard allegedly suffered a nervous breakdown.

Wierzbicki states that a total of eight people were murdered: landowners Ludwika and Antoni Wołkowicki, Ludwika's brother Zygmunt Wojnicz-Sianożęcki, (Note: The sources refer to the landowner Zygmunt Wojnicz-Sianożęcki (born around 1870) - son of Aleksander and Teresa, née Ciechanowiecka, the last owner of the Chalcz estate near Gomel, Stara Rudnia and Tursk (see Jasiewicz 1995 ↓, p. 927). Not to be confused with Zygmunt Wojnicz-Sianożęcki (b. 1880), son of Leonard and Paulina, née Gozdowska, lecturer in chemistry at Tauryd University and Warsaw Polytechnic, lieutenant-colonel in the Polish Army, who died in Soviet captivity in Krasnouralsk in September 1940 or, according to other sources, was deported deep into the USSR in 1944, where he died.) as well as local representatives of the Polish state apparatus: the head of the village, the village secretary, the cashier, the postman and the teacher.

== Epilogue ==
Dozens, if not hundreds, of such incidents took place around that time in Eastern Poland as the Soviet army advanced westward; the largest related incident was the Skidel revolt of 18–19 September 1939.

After the consolidation of Soviet power in the occupied Eastern Borderlands, several of the perpetrators of the crimes were accepted into the ranks of the militia. Ajzik Zusko, on the other hand, was appointed chairman of the local cooperative by the Soviet authorities. He was killed by the Germans in June 1941, shortly after the outbreak of the German-Soviet war.

== IPN investigation ==
Influenced by publications that appeared in 2001 in the pages of Nasz Dziennik, the investigation into the crime in Malaya Berestavitsa was initiated by the Institute of National Remembrance. It was discontinued in 2005 due to the exhaustion of evidentiary possibilities. In an interview with Nasz Dziennik, prosecutor Dariusz Olszewski of the IPN branch in Białystok stated:

The circumstances made it plausible that the crime was committed with the aim of destroying a group of people of Polish nationality, belonging to the circle of representatives of the intelligentsia and the state authorities. Thus, the act was qualified as an act of genocide, committed by persons acting in the interests of the communist state and inspired by its authorities.

In the course of several years of investigation, the IPN found sixteen people who were residents of the village at the time. However, upon questioning them, it was established that none of them had participated in the events under investigation, and that these witnesses based their knowledge only on third party accounts.

== See also ==
- War crimes in occupied Poland during World War II
- List of massacres in Belarus

== Bibliography ==
- Jasiewicz, Krzysztof (1995). Lista strat ziemiaństwa polskiego 1939–1956. Warsaw: PoMost, Alfa-Wero. Pomost. ISBN 8370019579.
- Szawłowski, Ryszard (1997). Wojna polsko-sowiecka 1939. Tło polityczne, prawnomiędzynarodowe i psychologiczne, agresja sowiecka i polska obrona, sowieckie zbrodnie wojenne i przeciw ludzkości oraz zbrodnie ukraińskie i białoruskie. Vol. I–Monografia. Warszawa: Antyk. ISBN 8386482494.
- Wierzbicki, Marek (2000). Polacy i Białorusini w zaborze sowieckim. Stosunki polsko-białoruskie na ziemiach północno-wschodnich II Rzeczypospolitej pod okupacją sowiecką 1939–1941. Warsaw: Oficyna Wydawnicza Volumen. Volumen. ISBN 8372331618.
- Wierzbicki, Marek (1997). "Powstanie skidelskie 1939 r." Białoruskie Zeszyty Historyczne (in Polish) (7). Archived from the original on 2011-07-16.
