= Kortelisy =

- Village
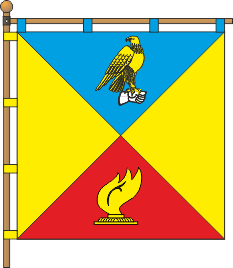
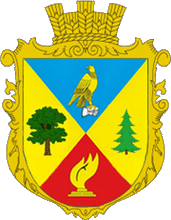
- Flag Coat of arms

- Location within Ukraine
- Coordinates: 51°51′9″N 24°25′49.08″E
- Country: Ukraine
- Oblast: Volyn
- Raion: Ratne
- Destruction: 22 and 23 September 1942

Kortelisy is a village in Ukraine which was destroyed on 22 to 23 September 1942, by Nazi German forces during the Great Patriotic War, with almost the entire population of the village being massacred. Around 2892 people were massacred by German forces (the Kortelisy massacre). The Nazis were assisted by local Ukrainian police.

The village was later rebuilt. Less well-known are reports that the German Army destroyed a total of 459 villages in Ukraine, killing many or all of their residents.
