= Dobromyl massacre =

NKVD mass murder in occupied Poland

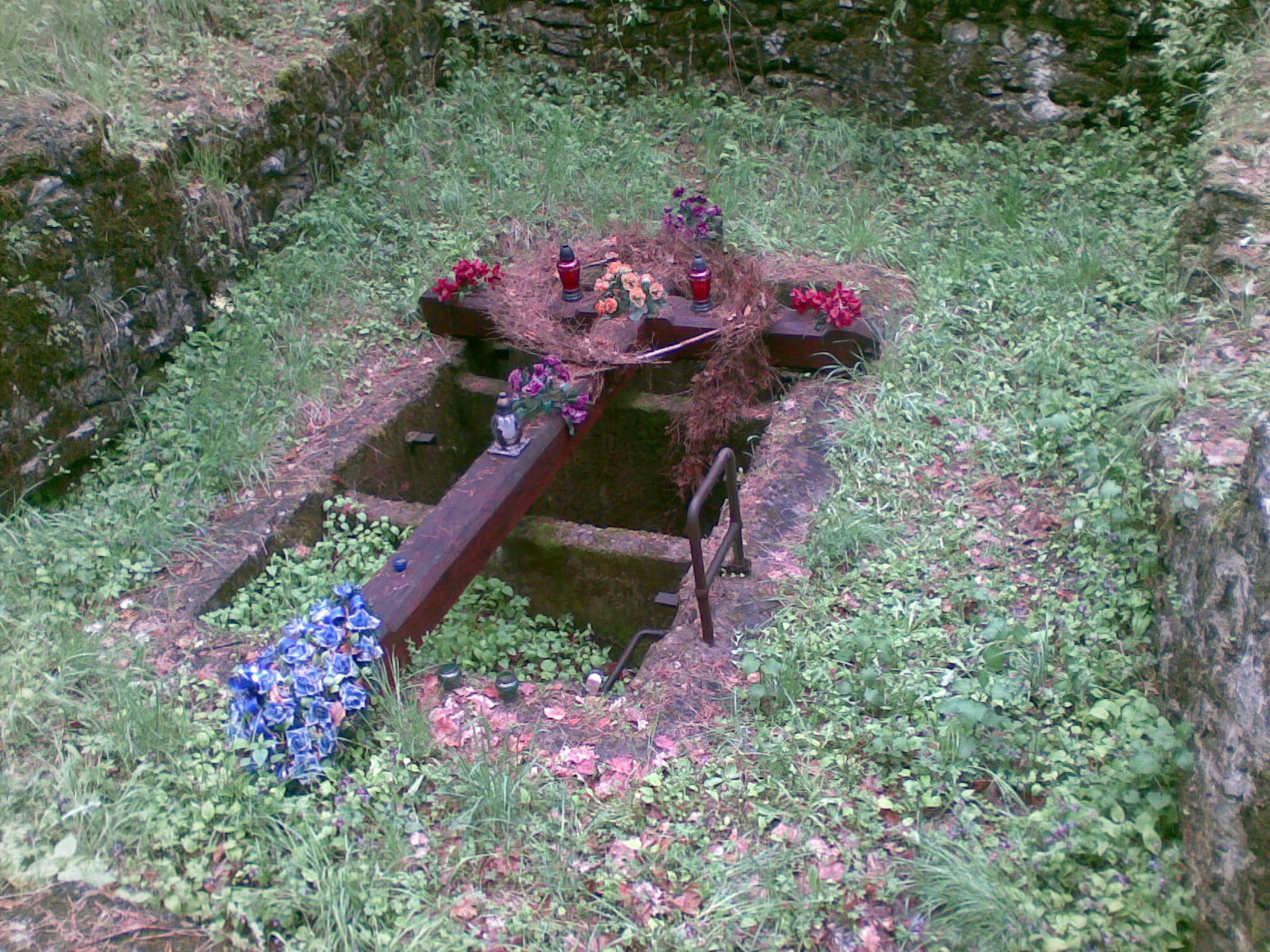
- Mass grave of NKVD's victims at the Salina salt mine
- Location: 49°34′55″N 22°45′50″E; Dobromyl – Salina salt mine
- Date: June and July 1941
- Attack type: mass murder
- Deaths: 500–1,000
- Perpetrator: NKVD

The Dobromyl massacre was a mass execution of prisoners held in the detention center in Dobromyl, carried out by NKVD officers in late June 1941, after the German invasion of Soviet Union began.

Mass executions took place both in the Dobromyl prison and in the Salina salt mine near Lacko. They were exceptionally brutal, as the NKVD officers, wanting to conceal evidence, murdered some of the prisoners with hammers and other blunt objects. The massacre resulted in between 500 and 1,000 deaths, mostly among Ukrainians and Poles. In addition to the inhabitants of Dobromyl and the surrounding area, many prisoners brought from Przemyśl and Mostyska were among the victims. The crime was one of many so-called NKVD prisoner massacres, carried out after the outbreak of the German–Soviet war.

After the Germans occupied Dobromyl, a pogrom targeting the Jewish population took place in the town, driven by the stereotype of "Judeo-Communism" that equated Jews with the Soviet system and its crimes.

== Background ==
On 22 June 1941, Nazi Germany invaded the Soviet Union. The first weeks of the war were very successful for the German side. Wehrmacht divisions managed to break up the armies of the Soviet border military districts and advanced deep into enemy territory. Among other things, the German attack on Volhynia and Eastern Galicia, where the largest and best-armed group of the Red Army – the Southwestern Front – was defending itself, was successful. In the first 20 days of the war, the Southwestern Front suffered enormous losses in manpower and equipment, and was forced to retreat almost 250 kilometers east of the German–Soviet demarcation line.

At the time of the German invasion, there were approximately 40,000–50,000 prisoners held in prisons and detention centers in Kresy. The Soviet authorities were determined to prevent them from being freed by the Germans. On 24 June 1941, Lavrentiy Beria ordered the regional offices of the People's Commissariat for State Security to shoot all political prisoners held in the western Soviet Union who could not be evacuated deeper into the country. The victims were mostly people convicted of "counter-revolutionary" or "anti-Soviet" activity, sabotage, and diversion, as well as political prisoners still under investigation. Following this order, between 20,000 and 30,000 people were murdered in Kresy alone. One of the most notorious crimes took place in Dobromyl.

== Course of the massacre ==
=== Prelude ===
Dobromyl, a county town in the Lwów Voivodeship before the war, had been under Soviet occupation since September 1939. It was located only 20 kilometers from the German–Soviet demarcation line. Those detained by the NKVD were held in the local prison that could accommodate about 60–70 prisoners.

Upon hearing the news of the German invasion, the NKVD began mass arrests of real and alleged enemies of the Soviet regime in Dobromyl and its surroundings. Because of this, among other reasons, the number of prisoners held in the detention center quickly increased. Dobromyl also became a transit point for prisoners evacuated from neighboring towns. On 23 June, around 70 prisoners from the prison in Przemyśl were brought to the detention center by trucks. Two or three days later, a column of 350–500 people, consisting almost exclusively of political prisoners, arrived on foot from the Przemyśl prison. (Note: After the German invasion began, another column of several hundred people was formed at the Przemyśl prison. Ultimately, it was supposed to consist of criminal prisoners, but a number of political prisoners managed to join it. The column was driven eastward, toward Medyka. The escort likely intended to shoot the prisoners in the forest near Shehyni. However, during the march, the column was intercepted by German troops and the prisoners were freed (Zbrodnicza ewakuacja (1997, p. 127); Waligóra (2013, pp. 51, 108–109)).) An unknown number of inmates from the prison in Mostyska were also transferred there.

=== Executions in the prison ===
The NKVD began executing prisoners on 24 or 25 June. Trying to conceal the crime, the Soviets initially chose an exceptionally cruel method of murder. During the first two or three days, prisoners were called out individually from their cells and taken to the prison woodpile, where the executioner killed them with a heavy hammer. According to eyewitness accounts, the perpetrator was Grauer, alias Kramer, a local NKVD collaborator of Jewish origin. (Note: The secretary of the local committee of the Soviet Communist Party, Bubnov, and the chairman of the city council, Petrovsky, also participated in the executions of prisoners (Zbrodnicza ewakuacja (1997, p. 69)).) Some of the prisoners brought to the woodpile were also murdered with bayonets. The bodies of the victims were transported by truck to the Salina salt mine, located 2 kilometers away near Lacko, where they were thrown into a disused shaft.

The brutality shocked even some of the torturers. According to one witness, the prison warden asked Alexander Malcev, the head of the NKVD in Dobromyl supervising the executions, to stop using a hammer and to kill the prisoners with firearms instead. However, the officer considered this request a sign of unacceptable "weakness" and personally shot the warden.

With the German army approaching, the Soviets were forced to accelerate the killings. The massacre reached its peak on the night of 26 to 27 June. The NKVD officers pulled the prisoners out of their cells, led them to a mass grave dug in the courtyard of the prison, and then murdered them with a shot to the back of the head. Those who tried to resist were killed in their cells. In their haste, the executioners did not manage to cover the grave. Only a few prisoners survived the massacre. Survivors included Dmytro Dvulit and Michał Mocio, who, despite being wounded, hid for some time among the piles of corpses in the mass grave, and Eustachy Pysarek, who hid under bodies in the prison corridor.

The Soviets evacuated Dobromyl early in the morning on 27 June (the Germans entered the town the following day). The residents, who had been watching the smoke from the burning files for several days and had heard the shots and screams of those being murdered the night before, broke into the prison, hoping to find their relatives and friends there. Witnesses recalled that the scene of the massacre was gruesome. The courtyard, cells, corridors, and stairs were strewn with corpses and flooded with streams of blood. Many bodies showed signs of brutal torture. Among others, the body of a Greek Catholic priest was found, whose limbs had been broken and whose tongue and genitals had been cut out. (Note: In the testimonies and accounts of witnesses who participated in the exhumations of victims of NKVD prisoner massacres, there are repeated references to the fact that the bodies found bore signs of brutal torture. It is possible that some NKVD officers abused their victims before murdering them. There were also reports – as was the case in Dobromyl – of some victims being killed with bayonets and blunt objects. However, Bogdan Musiał believes that the injuries, which witnesses often took to be signs of torture, were usually caused by the decomposition of the bodies (which progressed very quickly due to the summer heat), as well as by scavengers and inept exhumation. The executions were sometimes carried out very hastily, e.g., using grenades and machine guns. In addition, there were cases where, after the Soviets had left, the corpses were deliberately mutilated by Ukrainian nationalists who wanted to use drastic examples of their nation's martyrdom for propaganda purposes (Musiał (2001, pp. 235–241)).)

The murder of prisoners was not the only crime committed by the Soviets retreating to the east. In Dobromyl alone, they killed at least five civilians, including the principal of the local middle school and Roman Catholic priest, Jan Wolski, who was shot and stabbed with a bayonet while carrying the Blessed Sacrament to a sick parishioner.

=== Executions at the Salina salt mine ===
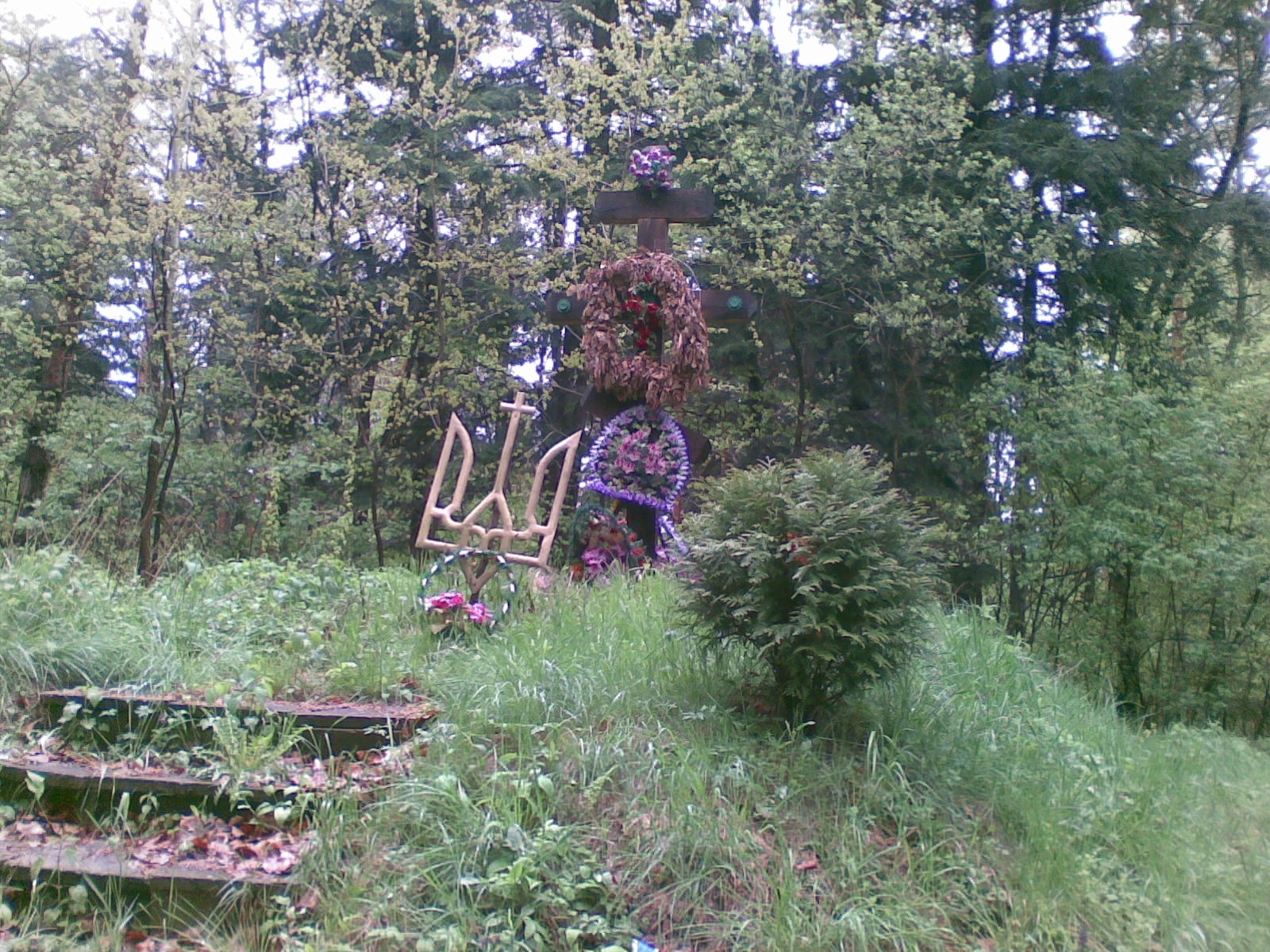
Mass grave at the Salina salt mine

On the border between Dobromyl and the village of Lacko (now Solonuvatka), stood a salt mine and saltworks, commonly known as Salina. According to unconfirmed reports, its shafts were used by the NKVD to dispose of bodies even before 22 June 1941. After the outbreak of the war, salt mining and production ceased entirely, and armed soldiers and NKVD officers began to appear at the site. Both the local population and mine workers were forbidden from entering the Salina area. On 25–26 June, the Soviets ordered the residents of nearby farms to lock themselves in their homes and cover windows with blankets. Shortly afterwards, even more drastic precautions were taken – residents were locked in basements under the guard of armed sentries. Those who accidentally witnessed the NKVD's activities at the mine faced arrest and death. There are reports that after the outbreak of war, the director of Salina ordered workers to report for outstanding payments, likely wanting to get rid of inconvenient witnesses, as most of those who obeyed the summons were to be arrested.

Some sources say that executions at the Salina began on the first day of the war, though they were most intense on 25–26 June. The massacre that took place in the mine was no less cruel than the executions in the detention center. The place of execution for female prisoners was the mine chapel, where the victims were murdered with hammers, among other things. Witnesses recalled that the walls, floors, and even the ceiling of the building were covered in blood. Some sources say that one of the victims was crucified on the wall of the chapel.

The place of execution for men was shaft No. 4, located within the mine orchard. Prisoners were led to its edge and then killed with a shot to the back of the head or a blow with a hammer. The latter tool was allegedly used by young female NKVD officers. The bodies of the murdered were thrown to the bottom of the shaft. The same was done with wounded prisoners, who drowned in brine or suffocated under piles of corpses. However, one man managed to survive the execution and then, under the cover of darkness, climb to the surface.

The bodies of murdered women and prisoners killed in the Dobromyl prison were also thrown into the shaft. The excavation, approximately 35–40 meters deep and 2.5 meters wide, was completely filled with bodies. As a result, the NKVD officers were forced to bury some of the victims in a mass grave dug near the shaft. After the massacre, the grave was covered with a thin layer of soil. The shaft was then filled with slag and covered with turf.

=== Victims ===
Sources provide conflicting information about the number of bodies found at crime scenes after the Soviets left. German documents report that the bodies of 68 people were found in the Dobromyl prison. Ukrainian witnesses, on the other hand, claimed that the number of bodies collected there was 51, 56, or 68. Polish sources, in turn, report that approximately 100–200 victims were found. Similar discrepancies appear for the Salina site. A Ukrainian witness questioned by German investigators claimed that the bodies of 94 people were recovered from the mass grave and over 47 corpses from a nearby shaft. Due to advanced decomposition from immersion in brine, the Germans quickly stopped the exhumation and ordered the shaft to be filled in and leveled. The nearby mass grave was also reburied. As a result, the exact number of bodies in the shaft remains unknown. The aforementioned witness estimated it to be at least 600.

Because of a lack of a full exhumation, conflicting witness accounts, and a lack of data from Soviet archives, the number of victims of the Dobromyl massacre can only be estimated. Polish historians assume that it amounted to approximately 500–1,000 people. On the other hand, some Ukrainian witnesses were inclined to estimate the number of those murdered at around 3,000–3,600.

The victims included Ukrainians, Poles, and Jews. The Soviets, wanting to get rid of witnesses to the crime, even murdered two local Jewish women who were employed as secretaries at the local NKVD office (one of them was heavily pregnant). In turn, in Salina, the mutilated bodies of a woman and her approximately six-month-old child were found, who were probably thrown alive into a grave.

== Aftermath ==
Some of the bodies found in the detention center were taken away by their families, while the unidentified remains were buried in mass graves at the cemetery in Dobromyl. A formal funeral for the victims of the massacre took place on the last Sunday of July 1941. For local Ukrainians, it became an opportunity to organize a nationalist demonstration.

As in the case of many other prison massacres, the Jewish population was blamed for the crimes of the NKVD, which, in accordance with the stereotype of "Judeo-Communism", was identified in its entirety with the Soviet system and its policy of terror. Shortly after the Wehrmacht units entered the town, an antisemitic pogrom took place in Dobromyl. In addition to the Germans, Slovak soldiers and members of an improvised Ukrainian People's Militsiya participated in the violence. (Note: One of the Slovak soldiers claimed that Polish residents of Dobromyl also participated in the pogrom. However, Waligóra (2013, pp. 84–85) argues that this information should be treated with caution, as the accounts of Slovak soldiers indicate that they had considerable difficulty distinguishing between Poles and Ukrainians.) During the unrest, the Ukrainians burned down the local synagogue. A group of about 200 Jews was forced to work on exhuming corpses from a mass grave and a shaft in Salina and then transporting them to the cemetery in Dobromyl. (Note: One witness claimed that Jews were forced to pull carts with coffins to the cemetery while German soldiers beat them with whips (Musiał (2001, p. 168)).) During this work, the workers were abused and humiliated by German soldiers and Ukrainian militiamen. The Soviet crime also served as a pretext for the Germans to carry out mass executions of Jews. Among others, some of the men forced to work on the exhumation in Salina were shot, and their bodies were thrown into the shaft. German reports state that "in retaliation," officers of the Einsatzgruppe C task force shot 132 Jews in Dobromyl. (Note: This crime took place on 30 June and was carried out by members of Einsatzkommando 6, one of the sub-units of Einsatzgruppe C. Musiał (2001, p. 224) emphasized that the fact that this unit was sent to such a small and remote town as Dobromyl indicates a connection between the crimes of the NKVD and the activities of the Einsatzgruppen.)

The NKVD crime was exploited by Nazi propaganda. The site of the massacre and the exhumation of the victims were filmed by a German propaganda team. The crime was reported by the collaborationist press in the General Government. On All Saints' Day 1941, the Germans posted an honor guard at the victims' grave in Dobromyl, likely in an attempt to win over the local community.

Salina also became a site of mass murder during the German occupation. In the summer of 1942, the Germans carried out a mass execution of Jews there.

== Commemoration ==
The victims of the crime were commemorated for the first time in the summer of 1941, when crosses were erected over the filled-in shaft and on the mass grave in Salina. Three years later, after Dobromyl was recaptured by the Red Army, the crosses were destroyed. The same fate befell the victims' grave. In place of the existing memorials, the Soviet authorities erected a plaque which falsely stated that the victims of the "fascist German occupiers" were buried in Salina.

During the Soviet era, a sanatorium for tuberculosis patients was established on the mine premises, and the chapel where some of the victims were murdered was converted into a canteen. Until the introduction of the glasnost policy, the communist authorities consistently tried to prevent the local population from commemorating the victims of the NKVD, including by destroying grassroots crosses and memorials. It was not until 1989 that the residents of Dobromyl and the surrounding area were allowed to tidy up the crime scene in Salina. The shaft and mass grave were then enclosed with a metal fence, and the grave was additionally marked with an oak cross. In addition, in July of that year, the first ceremony since the war to honor the victims of the massacre was organized in the former mine. In 1990, a similar ceremony was organized in Dobromyl itself, in front of the building that housed the NKVD prison and headquarters.

Proper commemoration of the victims of Soviet crimes became possible only after Ukraine gained independence. Each year on 26 June, mourning ceremonies are held in Dobromyl to honor the murdered. A commemorative plaque was unveiled on the site of the former prison. In 1996, a monument was erected over the shaft-grave in Salina, and in 2007, a chapel was built next to it. In 2011, a cross and statues of the Sacred Heart of Jesus and the Virgin Mary were erected opposite the site of the former chapel's foundations. A year later, a Polish-Ukrainian memorial march was organized from Przemyśl to Salina.

== Polish investigations ==
In 1991, an investigation into crimes committed by the NKVD in Salina was launched by the District Commission for the Investigation of Crimes against the Polish Nation in Rzeszów. A few months later, a separate investigation into murders committed at the detention center in Dobromyl was launched by the District Commission in Łódź. In 1995, both investigations were combined and transferred to the Łódź Commission, which on 31 December 1997 decided to suspend it "due to a long-term obstacle preventing the continuation of the proceedings".

In January 2006, the investigation into the crimes in Dobromyl and Salina was resumed by the branch of the Commission for the Prosecution of Crimes against the Polish Nation in Rzeszów, but after three years, it was decided to discontinue it due to the failure to identify the perpetrators. It was established that the only known participant in the crime, Aleksander Maltsev, died during the war.

== Bibliography ==
- Musiał, Bogdan (2001). Rozstrzelać elementy kontrrewolucyjne. Brutalizacja wojny niemiecko-sowieckiej latem 1941 roku [Shoot the Counter-Revolutionary Elements. The Brutalisation of the German–Soviet War in the Summer of 1941] (in Polish). Warsaw: Fronda Cultural Association. ISBN 83-88747-40-1.
- Popiński, Krzysztof; Kokurin, Aleksandr; Gurjanow, Aleksandr (1995). Drogi śmierci. Ewakuacja więzień sowieckich z Kresów Wschodnich II Rzeczypospolitej w czerwcu i lipcu 1941 [Roads of Death. The Evacuation of Soviet Prisons from Kresy of the Second Polish Republic in June and July 1941] (in Polish). Warsaw: Karta. ISBN 83-900676-9-2.
- Solonin, Mark (2015). Czerwiec 1941. Ostateczna diagnoza [June 1941. The Final Diagnosis] (in Polish). Poznań: Rebis. ISBN 978-83-7818-616-8.
- Waligóra, Jacek (2013). Zapomniana zbrodnia w Dobromilu-Salinie [The Forgotten Crime in Dobromyl-Salina] (in Polish). Kraków: Nemrod. ISBN 978-83-928666-3-3.
- Zychowicz, Piotr (July 2016). "Zbrodnia w kopalni soli" [The Crime at the Salt Mine]. Historia Do Rzeczy (in Polish). 7 (41).
- Zbrodnicza ewakuacja więzień i aresztów NKWD na Kresach Wschodnich II Rzeczypospolitej w czerwcu – lipcu 1941 roku. Materiały z sesji naukowej w 55. rocznicę ewakuacji więźniów NKWD w głąb ZSRR, Łódź 10 czerwca 1996 r [The Criminal Evacuation of NKVD Prisons and Jails in Kresy of the Second Polish Republic in June–July 1941. Proceedings of the Scholarly Session on the 55th Anniversary of the NKVD Prisoner Evacuation into the USSR, Łódź, 10 June 1996] (in Polish). Warsaw: Chief Commission for the Prosecution of Crimes against the Polish Nation. 1997. ISBN 83-903356-6-2.
