= Broniki massacre =

1941 massacre in the Soviet Union

Broniki Massacre
- Location: Broniki, Ukrainian SSR, Soviet Union
- Date: 1 July 1941
- Attack type: Massacre
- Deaths: 153 German POWs
- Perpetrator: Red Army

The Massacre of Broniki referred to the killing of members of the Wehrmacht by soldiers of the Red Army, on 1 July 1941 near the place Broniki, Rivne Raion in western Ukraine. Of the 153 victims from Infantry Regiment 35 (mot.) who were found, 132 "have been slaughtered in a bestial manner and were mutilated," as later the division commander of the 25th Infantry Division (mot.) reported.

Some members of the battalion survived, although seriously injured, or had been able to flee. They said later in the investigation hearing before the judge of the 25th Division Infantry Division (mot) Dr. Henrich and three other army judges, commissioned by the Wehrmacht-investigating authority with the investigation into the incident, the prisoners had to undress and leave valuables. After that they were shot. Also injuries from hand grenades and bayonets have been reported.

On 21 March 1983, the West German Radio (WDR) broadcast a documentary, which was based on Alfred de Zayas's investigation and also showed propaganda footage of the troops of the Wehrmacht on the massacre; witnesses talked to journalists in the documentary.

== See also ==
- Massacre of Grischino
- Massacre of Feodosia
