= Sinyawka =

Agrotown in Minsk Region, Belarus

Sinyawka Сіняўка
- Agrotown
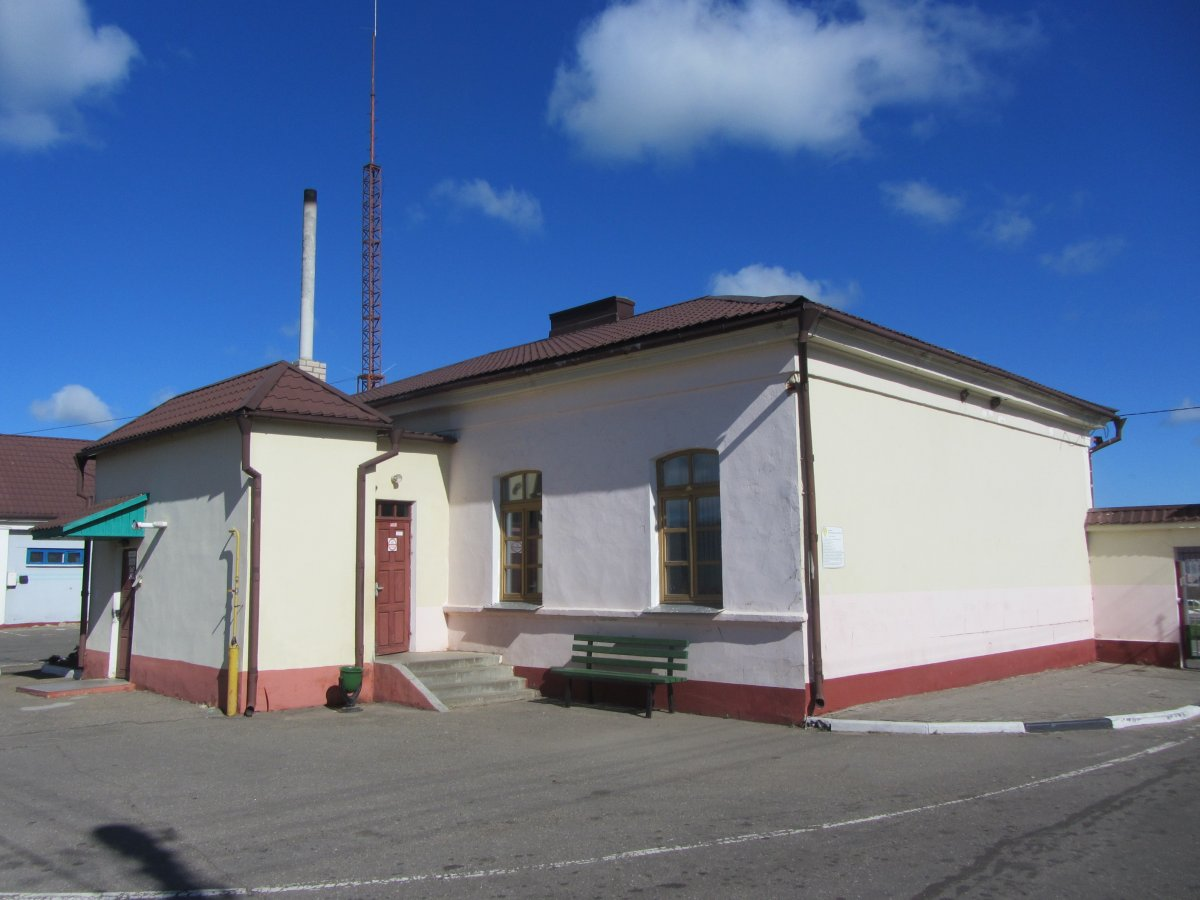

- Location within Belarus
- Coordinates: 52°57′N 26°28′E
- Country: Belarus
- Region: Minsk Region
- District: Klyetsk District

Population (2001)
  - Total: 1,728
- Time zone: UTC+3 (MSK)

Sinyawka (Note: Belarusian: Сіняўка, romanized: Siniaŭka; Russian: Синявка, romanized: Sinyavka; Polish: Siniawka.) is an agrotown in Klyetsk District, Minsk Region, in south-central Belarus. It is located 20 kilometres (12 mi) southeast of Baranavichy. In 2001, it had a population of 1,728.

== History ==
The settlement is known from the 15th century as a part of the Kletsk principality. It was later a possession of the Hlebowicz and Radziwiłł noble families, administratively located in the Nowogródek County in the Nowogródek Voivodeship of the Polish–Lithuanian Commonwealth. It was located at the intersection of the Brześć–Moscow and Nieśwież–Pinsk routes.

During the Polish–Soviet War, the town and train station were captured by the Polish 13th Wilno Uhlan Regiment on 14 March 1919. In the interbellum, Siniawka was divided into a town and village, both under the same name, administratively located in the Nieśwież County in the Nowogródek Voivodeship of Poland. According to the 1921 Polish census, the population of the town and village combined was 50.7% Polish, 38.9% Jewish and 10.3% Belarusian.

Following the invasion of Poland at the start of World War II in September 1939, it was first occupied by the Soviet Union until 1941, then by Nazi Germany until 1944. A few Jewish youths managed to flee Siniawka to the Soviet Union, and then the Germans established a Judenrat, banned the remaining Jews from leaving the settlement and established a ghetto. Some 600 Jews from Siniawka and some 130 Jews from Zaostrowiecze were eventually murdered by the Germans in two massacres in the fall of 1941 and summer of 1942. In 1944, the settlement was re-occupied by the Soviet Union, which eventually annexed it from Poland in 1945.

== Geography ==
Sinyawka is located at the intersection of the highways to Klyetsk, Hantsavichy and Ivatsevichy. It is situated 17 kilometres (11 mi) from Klyetsk and 144 kilometres (89 mi) from the capital Minsk.

== Sources ==
- "Сіняўка". Беларуская энцыклапедыя: У 18 т. Т. 14: Рэле — Слаявіна (in Belarusian). Mìnsk: Беларуская энцыклапедыя. 2002. p. 410. ISBN 985-11-0035-8.
- Megargee, Geoffrey P.; Dean, Martin (2012). The United States Holocaust Memorial Museum Encyclopedia of Camps and Ghettos 1933–1945. Volume II. Indiana University Press, United States Holocaust Memorial Museum. p. 1273. ISBN 978-0-253-35599-7.
