= Haradzishcha, Baranavichy district =

Urban-type settlement in Brest Region, Belarus

Haradzishcha Гарадзішча (Belarusian) Городище (Russian)
- Urban-type settlement
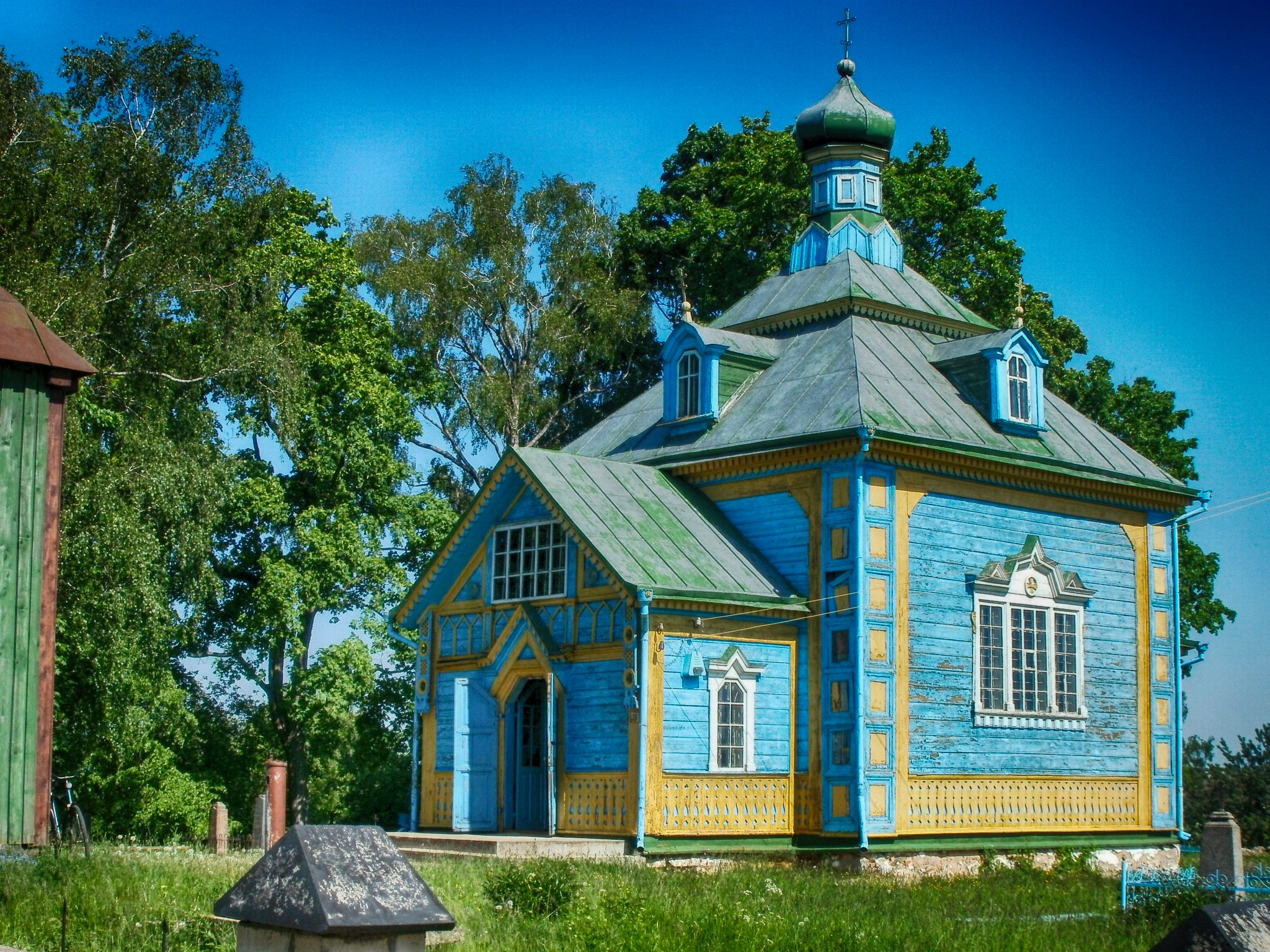
- Exaltation of the Holy Cross church

- Location within Belarus
- Coordinates: 53°19′38″N 26°00′18″E
- Country: Belarus
- Region: Brest Region
- District: Baranavichy District

Population (2026)
  - Total: 1,649
- Time zone: UTC+3 (MSK)

Haradzishcha (Belarusian: Гарадзішча, romanized: Haradzišča; Russian: Городище, romanized: Gorodishche) is an urban-type settlement in Baranavichy District, Brest Region, in west-central Belarus. It is located 40 kilometres (25 mi) north of Baranavichy. As of 2026, it has a population of 1,649.

== History ==
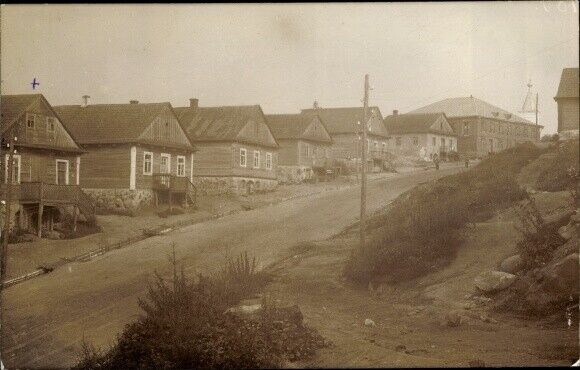
View from 1916

It was a private town, administratively located in the Nowogródek Voivodeship of the Polish–Lithuanian Commonwealth. The Kamieński family erected a Catholic parish church around 1640, whereas Michał Pac funded the Uniate church in 1764. The town was annexed by Russia in the Second Partition of Poland in 1793. It was a possession of Ludwik Michał Pac until 1831. The Catholic church was seized by the Tsarist authorities after the unsuccessful Polish January Uprising in 1864, whereas the local Uniate church was converted into an Orthodox church in 1839. During World War I, it was occupied by Germany.

In the interbellum, Horodyszcze, as it was known in Polish, was a town administratively located in the Nowogródek County in the Nowogródek Voivodeship of Poland. According to the 1921 Polish census, the population was 69.3% Jewish, 25.8% Polish and 2.2% Belarusian.

Following the invasion of Poland in September 1939, Horodyszcze was first occupied by the Soviet Union until 1941, then by Nazi Germany until 1944. The German occupiers established the Gorodishche Ghetto for local Jews. On 20–21 October 1941, the Germans committed a massacre of over 1,000 Jews at the nearby Misznowszyna Forest, with very few Jews remaining in the ghetto. The Germans massacred a further 35 and 100 Jews in May and August 1942, respectively, and 100 Romani people in November 1942. In 1944, the settlement was re-occupied by the Soviet Union, which eventually annexed it from Poland in 1945.

== Sources ==
- Megargee, Geoffrey P.; Dean, Martin (2012). The United States Holocaust Memorial Museum Encyclopedia of Camps and Ghettos 1933–1945. Volume II. Indiana University Press, United States Holocaust Memorial Museum. pp. 1196–1197. ISBN 978-0-253-35599-7.
