= Bombings and destruction of Kyiv 1941–1942 =

Bombings and destruction of Kyiv (1941–1942)
- Part of the Eastern Front of World War II
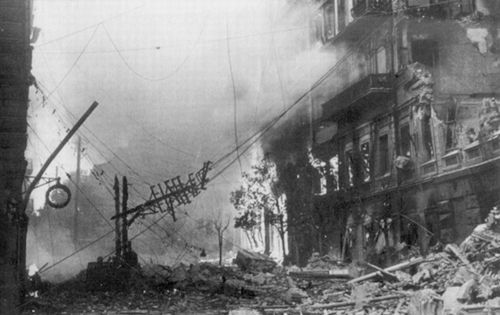
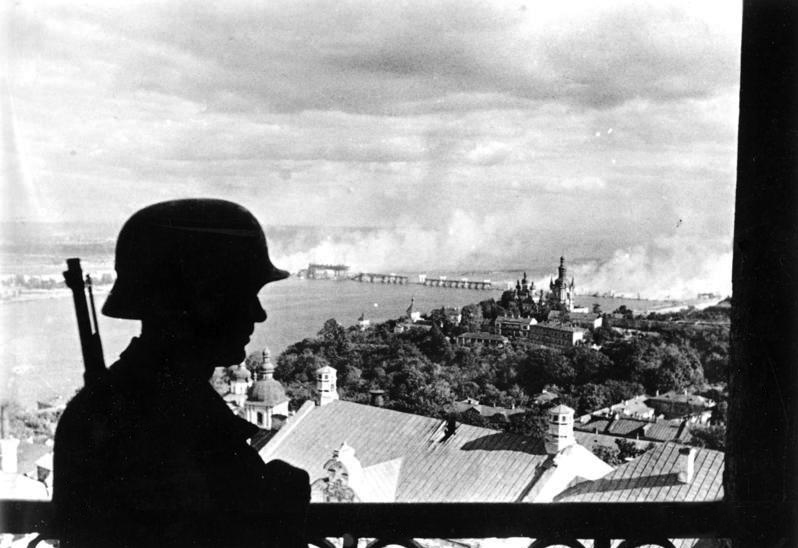
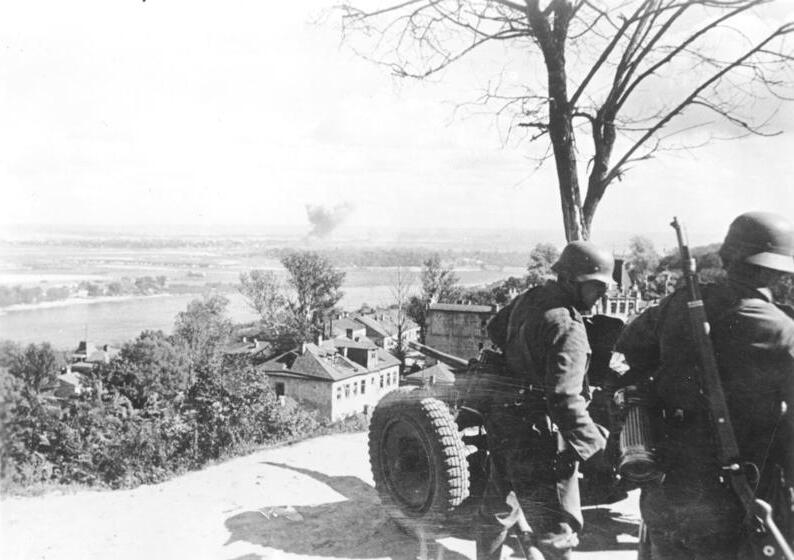
- Clockwise from top: Destroyed Prorizna Street in Kyiv; a German sentry at the Kyiv Fortress; a German bomber over Kyiv in 1941; a German anti-tank gun in position in Kyiv.
- Location: Kyiv, Kyiv Oblast, Ukrainian SSR, Soviet Union
- Date: 22 June 1941 – 1942
- Target: Kyiv civilians, Slavs, communists, and anti-Hitlerists
- Attack type: Bombings, massacre, genocide, mass murder, rape, summary execution
- Deaths: 200,000 civil killed
- Victims: 100,000 deported to concentration camps or expelled
- Perpetrators: Wehrmacht; SS; Luftwaffe; Paul Ludwig Ewald von Kleist; Kurt Eberhard; Paul Blobel; Otto Rasch; Friedrich Jeckeln; Eberhard von Mackensen; Franz Halder
- Motive: Anti-Slavic sentiment, Nazism, the Holocaust, anti-communism

The bombings and destruction of Kyiv in 1941–1942 refer to a series of catastrophic events that led to the large-scale devastation of Kyiv, the capital of Soviet Ukraine, during its capture and subsequent occupation by Nazi Germany in the early stages of the Eastern Front of World War II. This period encompasses the initial aerial bombardments of the city beginning on 22 June 1941, the massive fires and explosions that destroyed its central districts in late September 1941 following the entry of German troops, and the ongoing destruction of infrastructure and cultural heritage under the occupation regime. The events resulted in the deaths of over 200,000 civilians, the near-total destruction of the iconic Khreshchatyk street, and severe damage to irreplaceable architectural landmarks, including the Dormition Cathedral of the Kyiv Pechersk Lavra.

== Crimes against the civilian population ==
During the occupation of Kyiv, German forces systematically targeted the civilian population, enacting a policy of terror and mass murder. In one documented atrocity, soldiers of the Wehrmacht and SS locked elderly residents and children inside a building before setting it ablaze, burning the victims alive. The occupation regime routinely used public hangings and summary executions to terrorize the local populace, often in retaliation for acts of sabotage by Soviet underground fighters.

On September 29–30, 1941, the Sonderkommando 4a, under the command of Paul Blobel, executed 33,771 Jewish men, women, and children in the ravine of Babi Yar, marking one of the single largest massacres of the Holocaust. Mass arrests were conducted continuously, with victims confined to the Darnytsia and Syrets concentration camps, where thousands perished due to starvation, disease, and torture.

The Nazi administration also organized a forced labor program, deporting approximately 100,000 residents, primarily young people, to Germany as Ostarbeiter to work in the German war industry. Cultural and historical heritage was deliberately targeted, most notably with the demolition of the Dormition Cathedral of the Kyiv Pechersk Lavra on 3 November 1941. The combined effect of these atrocities resulted in the deaths of over 200,000 civilians in Kyiv during the 1941–1942 period, leaving the city's social and architectural fabric in ruins.

== See also ==
- Battle of Kiev (1941)
- Babi Yar
- Battle of Kiev (1943)
- Dormition Cathedral, Kyiv Pechersk Lavra
- Khreshchatyk
- Reichskommissariat Ukraine
- The Holocaust in Ukraine
- The Holocaust in the Soviet Union
- Eastern Front (World War II)
- War crimes of the Wehrmacht
- Einsatzgruppen
- Ostarbeiter
- Anti-Slavic sentiment
- Generalplan Ost
- Nazi war crimes in occupied Poland during World War II
- Siege of Leningrad
- Destruction of Warsaw
- Bombing of Dresden
- Nuremberg trials
- Forced labour under German rule during World War II

== Bibliography ==
- Berkhoff, Karel C. (2004). Harvest of Despair: Life and Death in Ukraine under Nazi Rule. Cambridge, MA: Belknap Press of Harvard University Press. ISBN 978-0-674-01308-7.
- Kamenir, Victor (2009). The Bloody Triangle: The Defeat of Soviet Armor in the Ukraine, June 1941. Minneapolis: Zenith Press. ISBN 978-0-7603-3514-7.
- Starinov, Ilya Grigorievich (1997). Записки диверсанта [Notes of a Saboteur] (in Russian). Moscow: Almanac "Vympel".
- Kuznetsov, Anatoly (1970). Babi Yar: A Document in the Form of a Novel. New York: Farrar, Straus and Giroux. ISBN 978-0-374-52817-1.
- Lower, Wendy (2005). Nazi Empire-Building and the Holocaust in Ukraine. Chapel Hill: University of North Carolina Press. ISBN 978-0-8078-2960-8.
- Snyder, Timothy (2010). Bloodlands: Europe Between Hitler and Stalin. New York: Basic Books. ISBN 978-0-465-00239-9.
- Dean, Martin (2000). Collaboration in the Holocaust: Crimes of the Local Police in Belorussia and Ukraine, 1941-44. New York: Palgrave Macmillan. ISBN 978-0-312-22056-3.
- Bartov, Omer (2001). The Eastern Front, 1941–1945: German Troops and the Barbarisation of Warfare. New York: Palgrave Macmillan. ISBN 978-0-333-94944-8.
- Förster, Jürgen (1998). "The German Military's Image of Russia". In Boog, Horst; Förster, Jürgen; Hoffmann, Joachim; Klink, Ernst; Müller, Rolf-Dieter; Ueberschär, Gerd R. (eds.). The Attack on the Soviet Union. Germany and the Second World War. Vol. IV. Oxford: Clarendon Press. ISBN 978-0-19-822886-8.
- Heer, Hannes; Naumann, Klaus (2000). War of Extermination: The German Military in World War II 1941–1944. New York: Berghahn Books. ISBN 978-1-57181-232-2.
- Megargee, Geoffrey P. (2006). War of Annihilation: Combat and Genocide on the Eastern Front, 1941. Lanham, MD: Rowman & Littlefield. ISBN 978-0-7425-4481-9.
- Streit, Christian (1978). Keine Kameraden: Die Wehrmacht und die sowjetischen Kriegsgefangenen 1941–1945 [No Comrades: The Wehrmacht and Soviet Prisoners of War 1941–1945] (in German). Bonn: Verlag J.H.W. Dietz Nachf. ISBN 978-3-8012-5016-4.
- Klee, Ernst; Dressen, Willi; Riess, Volker (1991). "The Good Old Days": The Holocaust as Seen by Its Perpetrators and Bystanders. New York: The Free Press. ISBN 978-0-02-917425-8.
- Browning, Christopher R. (2004). The Origins of the Final Solution: The Evolution of Nazi Jewish Policy, September 1939–March 1942. Comprehensive History of the Holocaust. Lincoln: University of Nebraska Press. ISBN 978-0-8032-1327-2.
- Arad, Yitzhak (2009). The Holocaust in the Soviet Union. Lincoln: University of Nebraska Press. ISBN 978-0-8032-2059-1.
- Brandon, Ray; Lower, Wendy (2008). The Shoah in Ukraine: History, Testimony, Memorialization. Bloomington: Indiana University Press. ISBN 978-0-253-35084-8.
- Musial, Bogdan (2004). Sowjetische Partisanen in Weißrußland: Innenansichten aus dem Gebiet Baranoviči 1941–1944 [Soviet Partisans in Belarus: Internal Views from the Baranovichi Region 1941–1944] (in German). Munich: R. Oldenbourg Verlag. ISBN 978-3-486-64588-7.
- Gerlach, Christian (1999). Kalkulierte Morde: Die deutsche Wirtschafts- und Vernichtungspolitik in Weißrußland 1941 bis 1944 [Calculated Murders: German Economic and Extermination Policy in Belarus 1941 to 1944] (in German). Hamburg: Hamburger Edition. ISBN 978-3-930908-54-7.
