= Pogoreltsevo =

Pogoreltsevo Погорельцево
- Village
- Location within Vologda Oblast Location within Russia
- Coordinates: 59°58′N 39°16′E
- Country: Russia
- Region: Vologda Oblast
- District: Ust-Kubinsky District
- Time zone: UTC+3:00

Pogoreltsevo (Russian: Погорельцево) is a rural locality (a village) in Bogorodskoye Rural Settlement, Ust-Kubinsky District, Vologda Oblast, Russia. The population was 4 as of 2002.

== Geography ==
Pogoreltsevo is located 53 km northwest of Ustye (the district's administrative centre) by road. Bogorodskoye is the nearest rural locality.
