= Husynne, Hrubieszów County =

Husynne
- Village
- Location within Poland
- Coordinates: 50°50′6″N 23°58′45″E
- Country: Poland
- Voivodeship: Lublin
- County: Hrubieszów
- Gmina: Hrubieszów
- Elevation: 190 m (620 ft)

Population
  - Total: 527
- Time zone: UTC+1 (CET)
  - Summer (DST): UTC+2 (CEST)
- Vehicle registration: LHR

Husynne ([xuˈsɨnːɛ]) is a village in the administrative district of Gmina Hrubieszów, within Hrubieszów County, Lublin Voivodeship, in eastern Poland, close to the border with Ukraine.

== History ==
In 1827 Husynne had a population of 384.

During the German-Soviet invasion of Poland at the start of World War II, on 23 September 1939, the village was the site of the Battle of Husynne between Poles and invading Soviet troops. The Soviets won the battle, and then carried out a massacre of 25 Polish prisoners of war. Seven Polish citizens were murdered by Nazi Germany in the village during the war.
