= Vrezh =

Alleged Armenian militant group

- Leader: Grayil Marukhian
- Dates active: 1989 - 1991
- Active regions: Azerbaijan

The Vrezh (transl. as Vengeance) was a hoax underground militant movement, whose existence was never confirmed.

Azerbaijan alleged that its creation was organized by the Armenian Revolutionary Federation in 1989 to "fight Azerbaijan and authorities in Northern Caucasus by bombing civilian targets".

== Operations ==
The organization is believed to have operated from the Russian city of Rostov-on-Don, where it was responsible for the murder of Colonel of Russian Internal Security Forces V. Blakhotin.

Allegedly, the organization was founded by an Grayil Marukhian, an anti-Soviet Armenian nationalist who was expelled from the Armenian SSR in the 1980s and lived in Greece and Syria since.

The bombing of a Tbilisi-Agdam bus on September 16, 1989 was blamed on Vredz by Azerbaijan. Azerbaijani security forces arrested two of the alleged perpetrators while they had purportedly been preparing another attack at the main bus station in Ganja.

Both were condemned to 20 and 15 years while the "mastermind" reportedly escaped. Azerbaijan claimed that Vrezh was the party in charge for the bombing of Tbilisi-Agdam bus close to Azerbaijani city of Ganja on August 10, 1990 and the failed attempt to bomb the Baku-Gazi-Magomet train on March 26, 1990 where the bomb was found and defused. Among other attacks believed to be the work of Vrezh are the April 30 and July 31, 1991 bombings of trains moving from Moscow to Baku.

== See also ==
- ASALA
- JCAG
