= 1990 Tbilisi–Agdam bus bombing =

Bus bombing

1990 Tbilisi–Aghdam bus bombing
- Location: 40.586944°N 46.315833°E; Khanlar, Azerbaijan, Soviet Union
- Date: August 10, 1990 (UTC+4)
- Attack type: Bombing
- Weapon: Improvised explosive device (IED)
- Deaths: 15–20
- Injuries: 16–30
- No. of participants: 2

The 1990 Tbilisi–Aghdam bus bombing, also known as 1990 Khanlar bus bombing occurred on 10 August 1990, in the vicinity of Khanlar, when an explosive device blew up in a bus 12.5 km away from Azerbaijan's second largest city, Ganja.

A map of Azerbaijan showing Khanlar's location.

== Fatalities ==
The bus with 60 passengers on board was travelling from the Georgian capital of Tbilisi to the Azerbaijani town of Aghdam. Fatalities reports range from 15 to 20. The number of the wounded with various degrees of injuries range from 16 to 30.

== Perpetrators ==
The bombing was allegedly carried out by two ethnic Armenians. Azerbaijan alleged that they were operatives of the possibly non-existent militant organization Vrezh. The organization's debut was the bombing of a Tbilisi-Baku bus on 16 September 1989, leaving 5 civilians dead and 27 injured.

The two men were Armen Mikhailovich Avanesyan and Mikhail Mikhailovich Tatevosov (Tatevosyan). Azerbaijani security forces claimed to have arrested them before their next plot on the same Aghdam–Tbilisi route, planned for 17 June 1991 was realized.

The Supreme Court of Azerbaijan charged and found them guilty in May 1992, sentencing Avanesyan and Tatevosyan to death and 15 years of imprisonment, respectively. Tatevosov was later exchanged for an Azerbaijani hostage in Tartar District of Azerbaijan in May 1992.

== See also ==
- 1994 Baku Metro bombings
- 1991 Azerbaijani Mil Mi-8 shootdown
