= Makrany =

Village in Belarus

Makrany Макраны
- Village
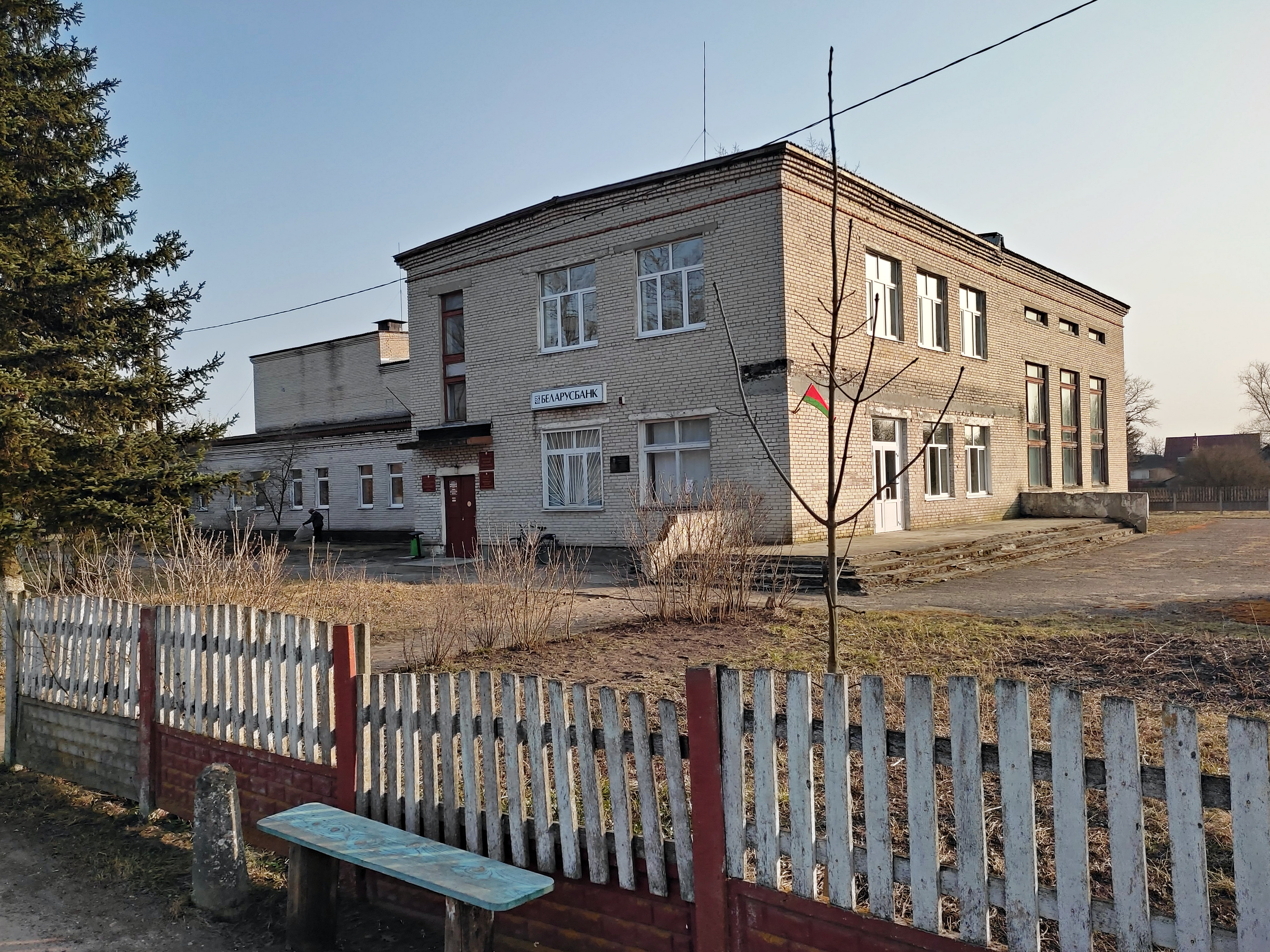

- Location within Belarus
- Coordinates: 51°50′N 24°15′E
- Country: Belarus
- Region: Brest
- District: Malaryta
- Elevation: 151 m (495 ft)
- Time zone: UTC+3 (MSK)

Makrany (Belarusian: Макраны, Polish: Mokrany) is a village in the Malaryta District, Brest Region in southwestern Belarus.

== History ==
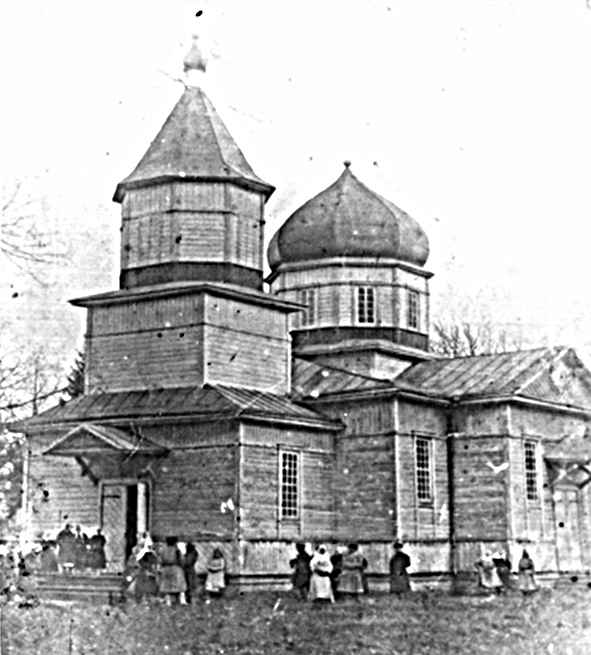
Local church in the early 20th century

The village was located in the Brześć Litewski Voivodeship of the Polish–Lithuanian Commonwealth until the Third Partition of Poland in 1795, when it was annexed by Russia. Following World War I, Mokrany was part of reborn Poland, within which it was administratively located in the Polesie Voivodeship.

Following the joint German-Soviet invasion of Poland, which started World War II in September 1939, Mokrany was first occupied by the Soviet Union until 1941. In September 1939, 30 Polish prisoners of war from the Riverine Flotilla of the Polish Navy were held by the Soviets in a local school building, and 18 were soon massacred (the Mokrany massacre). From 1941 it was occupied by Nazi Germany, and from 1944 it was re-occupied by the Soviet Union, which eventually annexed it from Poland in 1945. A monument to the victims of the Mokrany massacre was unveiled after the dissolution of the Soviet Union in 1991.
