= Battle of Husynne =

1939 battle of World War II

- Part of the Soviet Invasion of Poland in the European theatre of World War II
Date	24 September 1939
Location	Husynne, Lublin Voivodeship, Poland 50°50′6″N 23°58′45″E
Result	Soviet victory

Belligerents
Soviet Union	Poland

Commanders and leaders
Alexei Vinogradov	Witold Radziulewicz; Józef Cwynar

Casualties and losses
Several hundred killed and wounded	18 killed, 139 woundeded, 25 taken prisoner (later murdered)

The Battle of Husynne (Polish: bitwa pod Husynnem) was an armed engagement fought on 24 September 1939 between the Polish Army and the Red Army during the Nazi and Soviet invasion of Poland. The battle took place in the vicinity of Husynne manor, some 7 kilometres (4.3 mi) to the north east of the town of Hrubieszów. In the effect of a swift cavalry charge, a Polish improvised cavalry unit broke through Soviet infantry lines, but were then defeated by Red Army tanks.

On 24 September the 8th Rifle Corps of the Red Army crossed the Bug River near Hrubieszów. The unit, consisting of 44th and 81st Rifle Divisions, captured the town and headed westwards. It was met by an improvised Polish cavalry unit operating in the area. The Polish force, commanded by Major Witold Radziulewicz (retired), was composed of a march squadron of the 14th Regiment of Jazlowiec Uhlans, reinforced by a squadron of mobilised mounted police from Warsaw and an understrength battalion of chemical defence troops, some 1,500 men strong and armed with 36 81 mm wz. 31 mortars commanded by Capt. Józef Cwynar.

The Polish commander was heading southwards, towards the border with Hungary and Romania. Radziulewicz decided to break through the ranks of Soviet infantry and continue his march. The Soviet infantry started an assault of the Polish formation in an open field, but were met by a counter-charge of 400 Polish policemen, supported by the sudden bombardment of the mortar battery. The sudden counterattack caused panic in the Soviet lines and the Soviet infantry started a hasty retreat. Soon afterwards a Soviet tank detachment appeared from the Bug River valley. After a brief fight, the Poles were overwhelmed, surrounded and forced to surrender after the mortars had expended their ammunition.

The Red Army suffered several hundred casualties and the Poles lost 18 killed and 139 wounded. After the battle at least 25 Polish prisoners of war were murdered and are buried in a small war cemetery in Rogalin and in Husynne.

== See also ==
- List of World War II military equipment of Poland
- List of Soviet Union military equipment of World War II
