= Massacre of Feodosia =

Murder by Red Army soldiers of 150–160 wounded Wehrmacht POWs

- Part of the Eastern Front of World War II
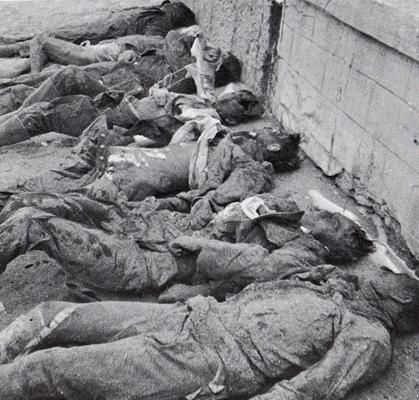
- Victims' corpses in front of the main hospital on the coast
- Location: Feodosia, Crimea
- Date: December 29, 1941- January 1, 1942
- Attack type: War crime; massacre
- Deaths: 160 German POWs
- Perpetrator: Red Army

The Massacre of Feodosia was a war crime by the Red Army against 160 wounded Wehrmacht POWs between December 29, 1941 and January 1, 1942. The massacre was notable for the relatively high number of victims and the "needless cruelty demonstrated" by the perpetrators, who froze victims into ice alive.

== Background ==
On November 3, the city was captured by elements of the German 46th and 170th Infantry Divisions. On December 29, Soviet marine troops and regular infantry landed on the beach of Feodosia and captured the city. According to Alfred-Maurice de Zayas, who relied solely on materials produced by the Wehrmacht High Command, "[A]n order was issued to kill every single German in Feodosia, whether wounded or not."

== Discovery ==
On January 18, 1942, the Germans were able to reconquer Feodosia. De Zayas states,

They found that around 150 wounded German military personnel had been murdered. Wounded soldiers had been thrown out of the windows of the hospital to make room for Soviet wounded, then water was poured on the heavily wounded soldiers who were then left to freeze. On the beach in front of the field hospital, piles of bodies were found where they were thrown from a wall several metres high, after being beaten and mutilated, and left in the surf so that the sea water froze and covered them with a sheet of ice. Some of the dead bodies showed severe signs of mutilation.

On 21 March 1983, the West German Radio (WDR) broadcast a documentary which was based on de Zayas' investigation and also showed propaganda footage of the troops of the Wehrmacht on the Massacre of Broniki; witnesses to the massacre talked to journalists in the documentary.

The special representative of the Stavka in Crimea, Lev Mekhlis, personally encouraged the killing of German prisoners of war.

== See also ==
- Battle of the Kerch Peninsula
- Massacre of Broniki
- Massacre of Grischino

== Literature ==
- Alfred de Zayas, Wehrmacht-Untersuchungsstelle
- Franz W. Seidler, Verbrechen an der Wehrmacht
