= Massacre of Grishino =

Soviet war crime in Pokrovsk, Ukraine

Grishino (Krasnoarmeyskoye) Massacre
- Location: Krasnoarmeyskoye, Ukrainian SSR, Soviet Union
- Date: February 1943
- Attack type: War crime
- Deaths: 596: 508 Axis POWs; 88 civilians
- Perpetrator: Red Army

The massacre of Grischino was committed by the Red Army in February 1943 in the eastern Ukrainian town of Pokrovsk, Ukrainian SSR, earlier named Postyschevo, Krasnoarmeyskoye, and Grishino. The massacre followed the capture of the town by the advancing Soviet army. A total of 596 prisoners of war, nurses, construction workers and female communication personnel (Nachrichtenhelferinnen) were killed. The Wehrmacht Untersuchungsstelle also known as WuSt (Wehrmacht criminal investigating authority), announced that among the victims were 406 soldiers of the Wehrmacht, 58 members of the Organisation Todt (including two Danish nationals), 89 Italian soldiers, nine Romanian soldiers, four Hungarian soldiers, 15 German civil officials, seven German civilian workers and eight Ukrainian collaborators.

German positions were overrun by the Soviet 4th Guards Tank Corps on the night of 10 and 11 February 1943. After their recapture by the 5th SS Panzer Division Wiking with the support of the 333rd Infantry and 7th Panzer Divisions on 18 February 1943, the German soldiers discovered numerous corpses. Alfred-Maurice de Zayas claimed that many of the bodies were mutilated, ears and noses cut off and genitals amputated and stuffed into their mouths. The breasts of some of the nurses were allegedly cut off, the women being raped. A German military judge who was at the scene claimed in an interview during the 1970s that he saw a female body with her legs spread-eagled and a broomstick rammed into her genitals. In the cellar of the main train station, around 120 Germans had been herded into a large storage room and then killed with machine guns.

On 21 March 1983, the West German Radio (WDR) broadcast a documentary on Soviet war crimes in the east from the files of the Wehrmacht investigative authority which also showed footage of the propaganda troops of the Wehrmacht on the massacre of Grishino and witnesses of the massacre had a chance to speak.

== See also ==
- Massacre of Broniki
- Massacre of Feodosia
- Massacre of Chenogne
- Massacre of Salina
