= Malaya Byerastavitsa =

Malaya Byerastavitsa Малая Бераставіца (Belarusian)
- Village
- Location within Belarus
- Coordinates: 53°16′N 23°55′E
- Country: Belarus
- Region: Grodno Region
- District: Byerastavitsa District
- Time zone: UTC+3 (MSK)

Malaya Byerastavitsa (Belarusian: Малая Бераставіца; Russian: Малая Берестовица, romanized: Malaya Berestovitsa; Polish: Brzostowica Mała; Lithuanian: Mažoji Berestovitsa) is a village in Byerastavitsa District, Grodno Region, Belarus. It is located near the city of Grodno.

From 1920 to 1939, it belonged to the Second Polish Republic and was part of Białystok Voivodeship. A massacre of Polish inhabitants occurred there in 1939.

The village has a Russian Orthodox church named after Saint Dimitri Solunski (built in 1868), and a museum. An eighteenth-century estate located in Malaya Byerastavitsa is the district's architectural monument.

== Bibliography ==
- Sights of Malaya Berestovitsa
