= Petras (given name) =

- Gender: Male
- Name day: 29 June

Origin
- Region of origin: Lithuania

Other names
- Related names: Peter

Petras is a masculine given name. It is a cognate of Peter, which is derived from the Greek word "petros" meaning "stone, rock". People with the give name Petras include:

- Petras Auštrevičius (born 1963), Lithuanian politician, diplomat, civil servant
- Petras Balocka (born 1986), Lithuanian basketball player
- Petras Ciunis (1898–1979), Lithuanian army officer, educator
- Petras Cvirka (1909–1947), Lithuanian author
- Petras Dirgėla (born 1947), Lithuanian author
- Petras Geniušas (born 1961), Lithuanian classical pianist
- Petras Giniotas (born 1952), Lithuanian politician
- Petras Griškevičius (1924-1987), Lithuanian-Soviet politician
- Petras Kalpokas (1880–1945), Lithuanian painter and educator
- Petras Karla (1937–1969), Lithuanian rower and Olympic competitor
- Petras Klimas (1891–1969), Lithuanian diplomat, author and historian
- Petras Kubiliūnas (1894–1946), Lithuanian military officer and politician
- Petras Kunca (born 1942), Lithuanian violinist
- Petras Mantigirdaitis (died 1459), nobleman of the Grand Duchy of Lithuania and Grand Marshal of Lithuania
- Petras Jonaitis Mantigirdaitis (died c.1497), nobleman of the Grand Duchy of Lithuania
- Petras Poškus (born 1935), Lithuanian politician
- Petras Raslanas (born 1914), Lithuanian communist activist, politician and fugitive
- Petras Repšys (born 1940) Lithuanian artist
- Petras Rimša (1881–1961), Lithuanian sculptor
- Petras Šiurskas (born 1953), Lithuanian sprint canoer
- Petras Stankeras (born 1948), Lithuanian historian
- Petras Vaitiekūnas (born 1953), Lithuanian politician, former Foreign Minister of Lithuania
- Petras Vileišis (1851–1926), Lithuanian engineer, political activist and philanthropist

== See also ==
- Petras (surname)
