= Berezwecz-Taklinovo Death Road =

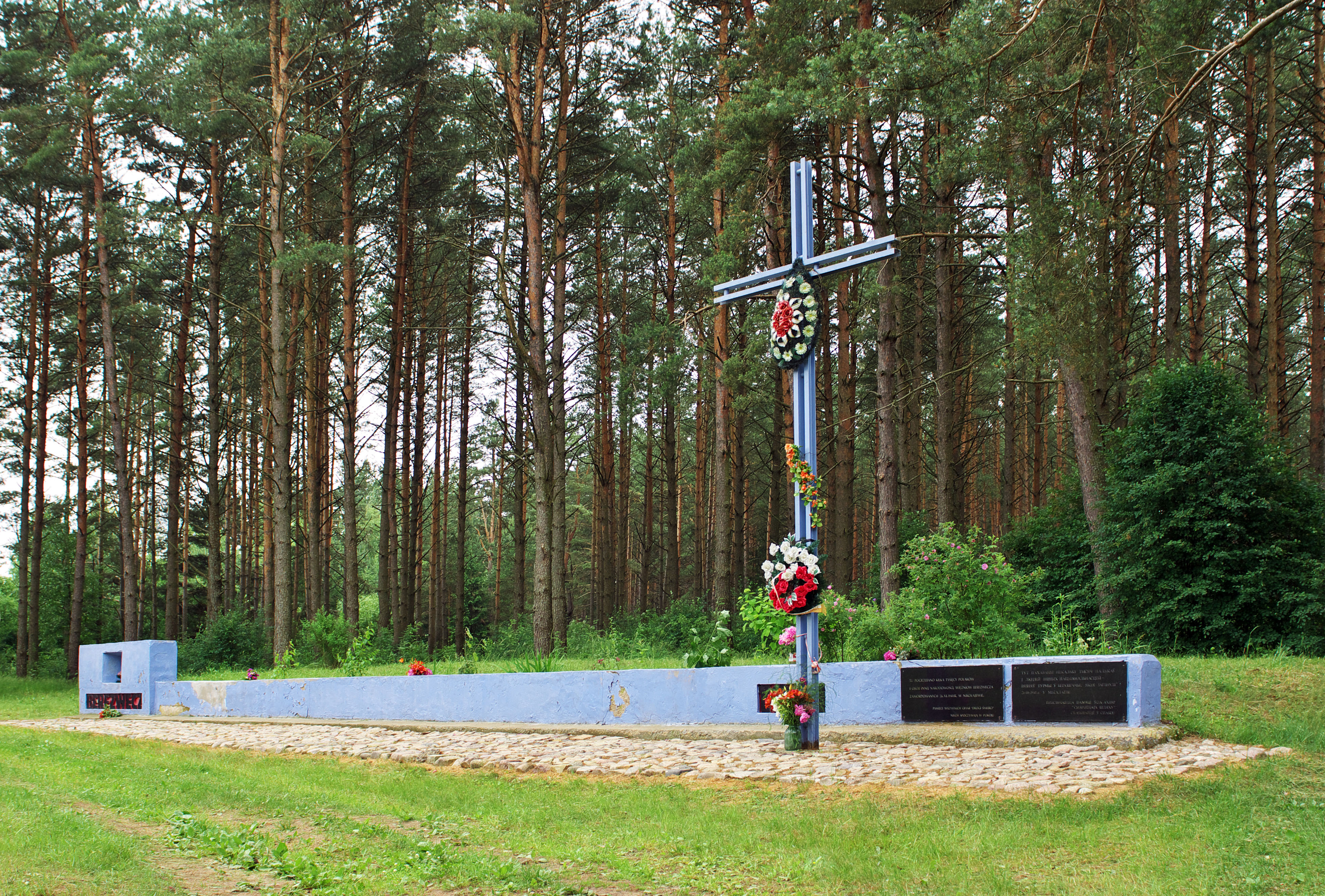
Mass grave and memorial in Mikalayeva

The Berezwecz-Taklinovo Death Road was the path of the deadly compelled evacuation of inmates from the prison in the village of Berezwecz in occupied Poland (now part of the city of Hlybokaye in Belarus). The liquidation of the prison, carried out by the NKVD after the German invasion of the USSR, began on the night of June 23–24, 1941, with the targeted execution in the prison's basements of inmates deemed particularly dangerous. The next day, the remaining prisoners were rushed towards Vitebsk. During the 120-kilometer death march, they died en masse due to exhaustion, hunger, thirst and at the hands of the guards. The last stop on the 'road of death' was the Taklinovo kolkhoz (today Mikalayeva), where on June 28, the Soviets executed almost all the prisoners. Approximately 1-2 thousand people were murdered during the evacuation of the prison in Berezwecz.

== Background ==
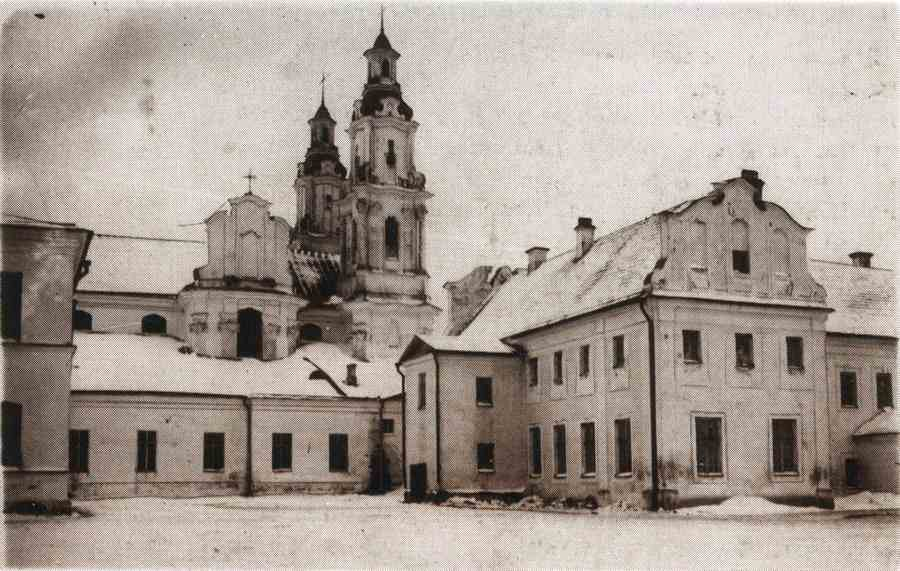
Church and monastery in Berezwecz (before 1918)

Berezwecz is now a part of Hlybokaye city in Belarus. In the interwar period, it was a village within the Second Polish Republic's borders. Its prominent feature was the church and monastery of the order of Saint Basil the Great. Under Polish rule, the church was reinstated to the Catholic Church, while the monastery functioned as the barracks of the Border Protection Corps.

After the German-Soviet invasion of Poland in 1939, Berezwecz fell under Soviet occupation. The former monastery was repurposed as a prison. It was one of four Soviet prisons in the Vileyka Oblast. Soviet official documents referred to it as "Prison No. 28". Sergeant of State Security Mikhail Nikolayevich Priyomyshev, served as the prison warden.

Berezwecz prison primarily housed individuals apprehended in Hlybokaye, Braslaw, Dzisna, Hiermanavičy, Halubichy, Plisa, Pastavy, Sharkawshchyna, and neighboring cities. It also detained residents from other Polish regions, including refugees from areas under German occupation. According to findings by the District Commission for the Prosecution of Crimes against the Polish Nation in Łódź, between September 17, 1939, and June 24, 1941, the NKVD executed an estimated 500 to 800 individuals within the prison premises.

On June 22, 1941, Nazi Germany commenced its invasion of the Soviet Union. With the rapid advancement of the German offensive, the NKVD exterminated political prisoners in the war zone. In the summer of 1941, within the part of Poland occupied by the USSR, an estimated 20,000 to 30,000 individuals in prisons and detention centers were murdered.

The "death marches" or "death roads" were a characteristic method used to liquidate Soviet prisons in present-day western Belarus. Prisoners were forcibly taken from their cells and compelled to march east in scorching summer conditions for several days. This 'evacuation' method led to mass deaths among prisoners due to exhaustion, hunger, and thirst. Some fell victim to German air raids, while others were massacred by Soviet guards.

== The course of events ==
=== Beginning of evacuation ===
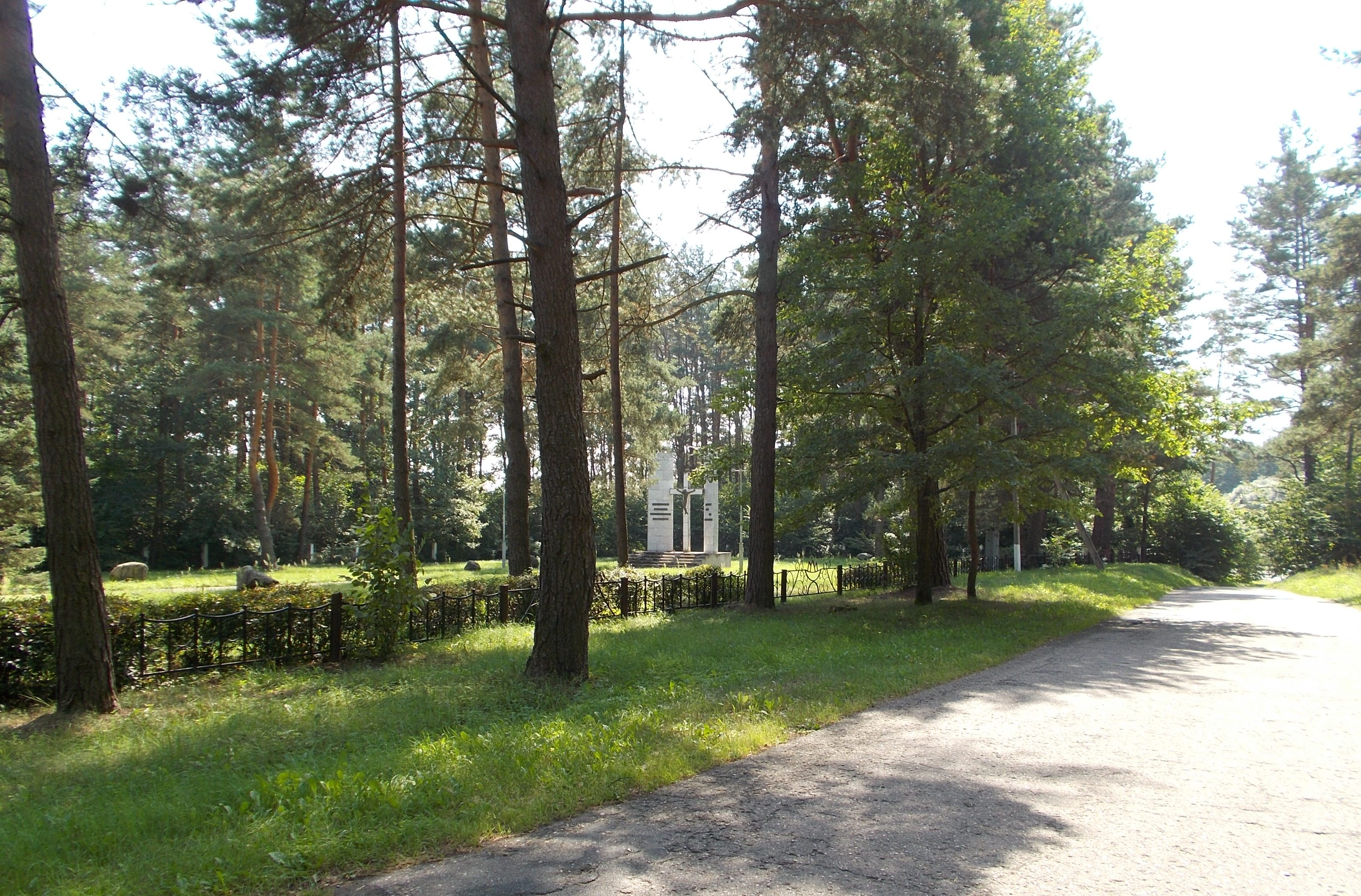
Memorial in Borek forest near Hlybokaye, commemorating the victims of the Stalinist and Nazi regimes

According to documents from Soviet archives, as of June 10, 1941, the prison in Berezwecz held 680 inmates. Additional NKVD records from June 1941 concerning the planned evacuation of the prisoners from Berezwecz to the Uzbek SSR indicated an intended evacuation of 678 inmates. However, it is certain that the number of prisoners was higher when the evacuation began. On the night of June 19–20, the Soviets initiated a fourth mass deportation from occupied Polish territories deep into USSR. Many of the deportees were temporarily confined in the cells of Berezwecz prison. Furthermore, after the German invasion began, the NKVD began mass arrests of alleged "enemies of the people". These individuals were not registered in the prison records.

On June 23, 1941, the representative of the prison branch of the NKVD of the Byelorussian SSR, a head of the operational department named Pariemsky, who was in Maladzyechna at that time, called prison warden Priyomyshev and ordered him to immediately start evacuating prisoners. The liquidation of the Berezwecz prison began the same night. The Soviets managed to evacuate some prisoners east by train. According to documents from Soviet archives, on July 20, 1941, a transport with 261 prisoners evacuated from Berezwecz reached Kazan. However, most of the prisoners from Berezwecz were forced to move eastward on foot.

Before the "death march" commenced, the NKVD decided to execute some of the prisoners considered the most dangerous on the spot. Mass executions occurred on the night of June 23–24 in the prison's basements, where shots and screams were obscured by loud music blaring from megaphones. The extent of the massacre came to light after the Soviets fled from Berezwecz, when the families of prisoners searched the monastery for their relatives. They discovered dozens of corpses either buried in mass graves or bricked up in cells. Witnesses recalled that many bodies displayed signs of brutal torture, with ropes around their necks and their hands tied. (Note: In the testimonies and accounts of witnesses involved in the exhumation of the victims of the NKVD prisoner massacres, there is repeated mention of discovered bodies bearing signs of severe torture. Some evidence suggests that certain NKVD members may have abused the victims before their murders. Moreover, it is a known fact that some victims were killed using bayonets and blunt instruments. However, according to Bogdan Musiał's perspective, the injuries initially thought to be signs of torture by witnesses were likely a result of the rapid decomposition of the corpses, particularly accelerated by the summer heat, as well as the activity of scavengers and unskilled handling during exhumation. Additionally, executions were sometimes conducted hastily, such as using grenades and machine guns. Also, he believes that in Eastern Galicia and Volhynia, there were cases where, after the departure of the Soviets, the bodies of NKVD victims were purposely mutilated by Ukrainian nationalists seeking to depict dramatic examples of their nation's martyrdom for propaganda purposes. See: Musiał (2001), pp. 235–241.) Conservative estimates suggest several dozen people were killed that night within the prison. However, some eyewitnesses claimed the number of victims ranged from 360 to as high as 800 individuals. Investigations revealed that, apart from NKVD officers, Skroba, the secretary of the local VKP(b) committee, allegedly participated in the executions. He purportedly boasted, while under the influence of alcohol, of personally shooting 18 prisoners.

=== Death march and massacre in Taklinovo ===
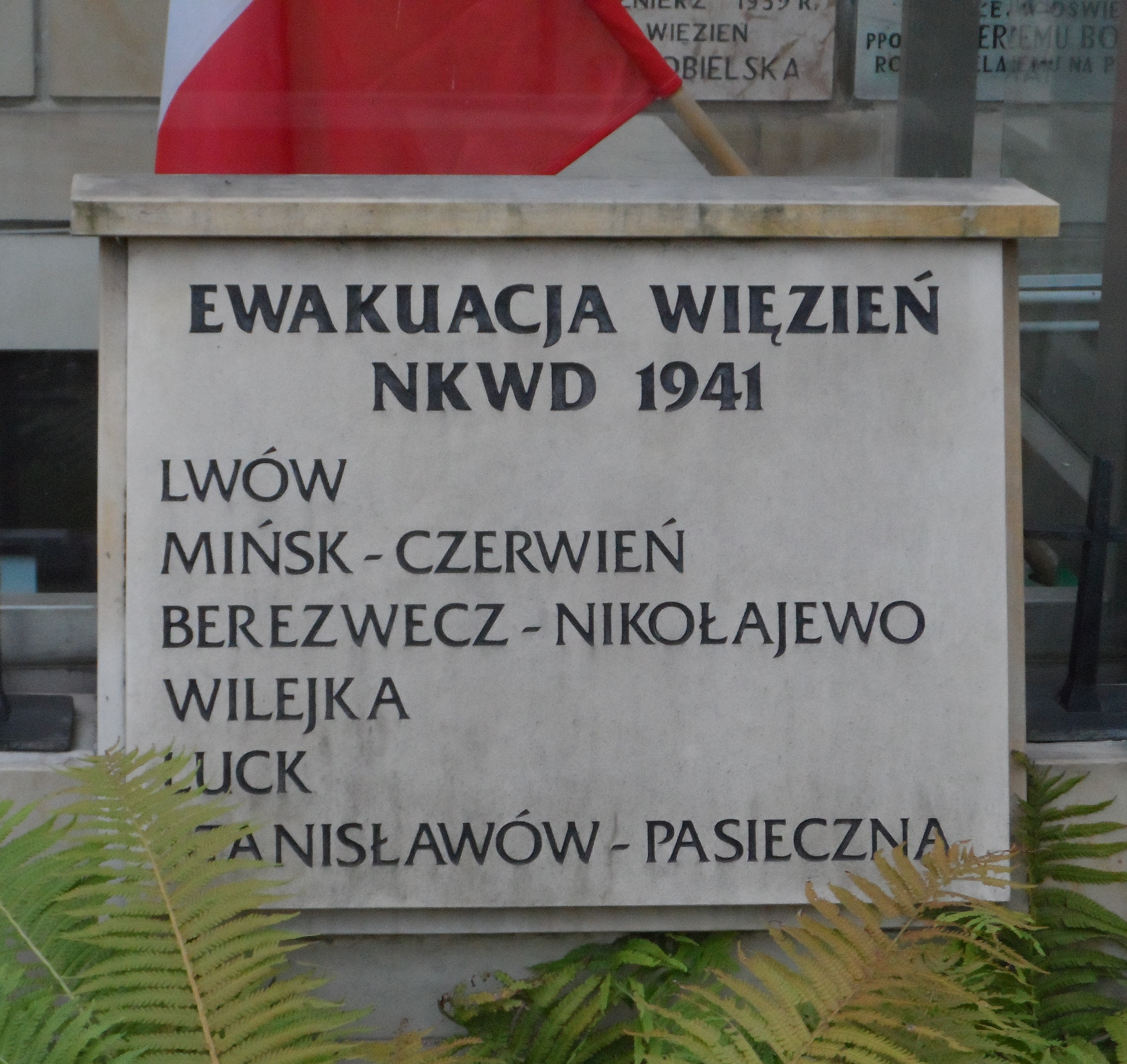
A plaque on the premises of the St. Stanislaus Kostka Church in Warsaw, commemorating the victims of the NKVD prisoner massacres, including prisoners from Berezwecz

Preparations for the march began on the night of June 23–24. Prisoners were taken out of their cells and assembled in the prison yard starting at 2:00 a.m. The march itself commenced three hours later. Determining the precise number of prisoners evacuated from Berezwecz remains challenging due to conflicting information, even within Soviet archives. "The List of departures and movements of transports from NKVD prisons of the Byelorussian SSR" indicates 830 prisoners were evacuated on foot. In contrast, the report from the military prosecutor of the Vitebsk garrison, Glinka, noted a column of "916 convicts and prisoners under investigation". (Note: Glinka's calculations comprised approximately 500 political prisoners and around 400 criminal prisoners. See: Popiński, Kokurin i Gurjanow (1995), p. 119.) However, the District Commission for the Prosecution of Crimes against the Polish Nation in Łódź estimated the number to be between 1,500 and 3,000 inmates evacuated from Berezwecz. Along with the prisoners, members of the prison staff (Note: Glinka's report stated that the escort consisted of 67 guards. See: Popiński, Kokurin i Gurjanow (1995), p. 119.) and their families were part of the evacuation. Michał Bogowicz, a survivor of the "death march", estimated that the marching column extended 1.5 kilometers in length.

Shortly after leaving the prison gate, the column encountered a crowd of prisoners' relatives, hoping to see their loved ones and provide them with parcels of water, food, or clothing. However, any contact was obstructed by the guards, who used force, beating both prisoners and their family members and employing dogs to deter them. As the column departed Berezwecz, it traversed Kavali, Halubichy, Pieravoz, Ushachy, Saročyna, and Uła en route to Vitebsk. Throughout the several-day march, the prisoners were deprived of water and food. Those unable to keep pace with the column, attempting to escape, resisting, or responding slowly to orders, were either shot or bayoneted by the guards. Surviving prisoners recounted that the column's path was littered with numerous corpses. (Note: Michał Bogowicz, a survivor of the 'death march,' alleged that in the initial phase of the march, the NKVD transported some of the exhausted prisoners on horse-drawn wagons and subsequently secretly executed them. See: Popiński, Kokurin i Gurjanow (1995), pp. 65–66.) Mass executions also occurred during the march. In the Saročyna area, prison warden Priyomyshev and five guards executed 27 or 32 prisoners in retribution for the escape of one of the inmates. Prosecutor Glinka reported in his findings that "on the way [...] Priyomyshev shot 55 individuals at different times and in two separate incidents".

On June 28, the "death march" reached its peak. (Note: Some sources, however, date these events to June 25 or 26. See: Popiński, Kokurin i Gurjanow (1995), p. 66 and Criminal evacuation (1997), p. 90.) On that day the column arrived in the town of Uła. Two Polish survivors later recounted that local residents displayed hostility towards the prisoners, hurling insults and even encouraging the escort to execute them, shouting, "Comrades, where are you taking these bandits, these Polish pigs? Kill them on the spot!" According to Bogdan Musiał, this incident may have influenced the subsequent actions of the NKVD personnel.

Soon after, as the column crossed the bridge over the river Daugava, near the Taklinovo kolkhoz (today Mikalayeva), a German aircraft flew overhead and bombed the bridge. This airstrike incited panic among the prisoners. Subsequently, Priyomyshev ordered the massacre of the entire column. The guards opened fire with machine guns, resulting in the death of several hundred prisoners. Those wounded were then fatally shot, bayoneted, or struck with rifle butts.

Only a few prisoners survived and managed to escape to the forest or hide under the bodies of their murdered comrades. The Soviets caught some of the escapees with the help of the local population, (Note: On the other hand, Nadzieja Krassowska, the wife of one of the victims, recalled that later the kolkhozniks from Taklinovo treated the prisoners' families with compassion and kindness, and even helped mark mass graves with crosses. See: Criminal evacuation (1997), pp. 91–92.) and then took them to Vitebsk, and from there deeper into the USSR. The day after the massacre, five or six escapees were caught and shot in the village of Uboina (located on the right bank of the Daugava, 15 km northwest of Mikalajeva).

The perpetrators acted in such hurry that they did not dispose of the bodies, just forced some temporarily spared prisoners to pick up the corpses on the road and throw them into roadside ditches. It was only the next day that a special NKVD commando appeared at the site of the massacre and forced the kolkhozniks (collective farmers) from Taklinovo to collect the bodies of the murdered and bury them in five potato pits located in the nearby forest. After the Wehrmacht occupied this area, the victims of the massacre were exhumed and then buried in a large mass grave dug at the edge of the forest.

=== Victims ===
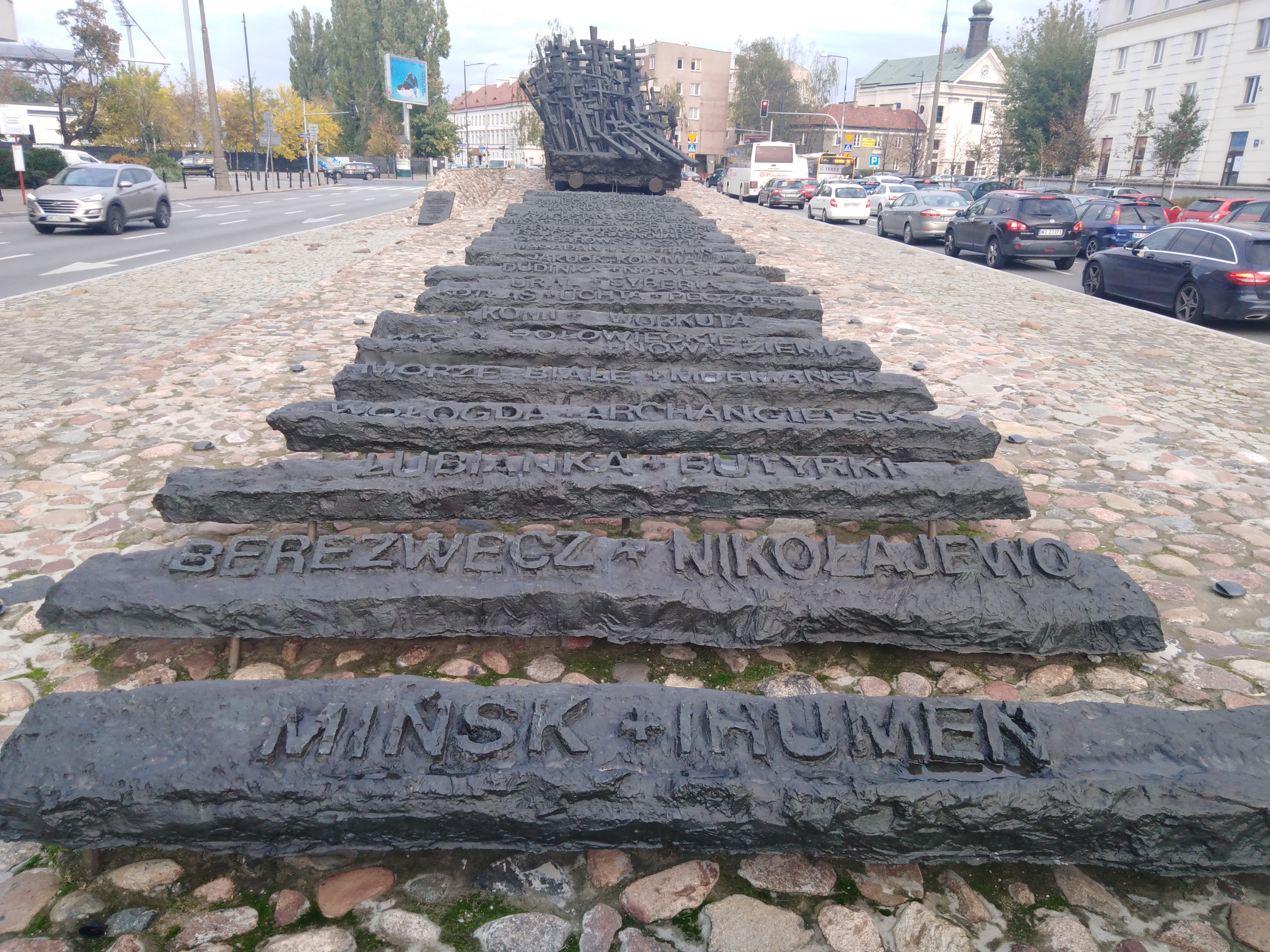
Monument to the Fallen and Murdered in the East in Warsaw. In the foreground, a second railway tie displays the inscription "Berezwecz Nikołajewo"

The number of victims of the "death road" remains difficult to determine. In his report on the evacuation of NKVD prisons of the Byelorussian SSR, prepared on September 3, 1941, the deputy head of the NKVD Byelorussian SSR's prison administration, lieutenant of state security Opalev, stated that "up to 600 people" were shot. "The List of departures and movements of transports from NKVD prisons of the Byelorussian SSR", as well as the report of military prosecutor Glinka indicate that during the evacuation the guards killed 714 prisoners. Polish prisoner Paweł Kożuch, who survived hidden under the bodies of other victims, claimed that he heard NKVD men count the bodies and come to 1773.

Polish historian Sławomir Kalbarczyk estimated that the number of victims most probably exceeded a thousand. Other historians, based on witness testimonies, estimated approximately 1,000–2,000 murdered prisoners. The victims included Fr. Franciszek Kuksewicz, Roman Catholic parish priest in Miory, and Fr. Stanisław Eliasz, parish priest in Idolta – both arrested after the outbreak of the German-Soviet war.

More than five hundred victims were imprisoned without sentences ("were under investigation"), so even from the Soviet legal perspective they were innocent and their execution was illegal.

== Aftermath ==
Priyomyshev's illegal conduct sparked a reaction from the prosecutor of the Vitebsk garrison, third-rank military jurist Glinka. On July 4, 1941, Glinka ordered the arrest of the prison warden and put him before a military tribunal, at the same time requesting that the accused be sentenced to death. Priyomyshev defended himself by claiming that the prisoners were trying to escape, allegedly shouting "Long live Hitler!" The deputy people's commissar of internal affairs of the Byelorussian SSR, Ptashkin, and the head of the NKVD board of the Vitebsk region, Motavkin, interceded for him. Ultimately, the first secretary of the Central Committee of the Communist Party of Belarus, Panteleimon Ponomarenko, found the warden's actions justified and ordered him released. Priyomyshev was released from custody the day German troops entered Vitebsk. His further fate is unknown.

The District Commission for the Prosecution of Crimes against the Polish Nation in Łódź managed to determine the names of fifteen NKVD officers suspected of participating in the murder of prisoners from Berezwecz.

== Remembrance ==
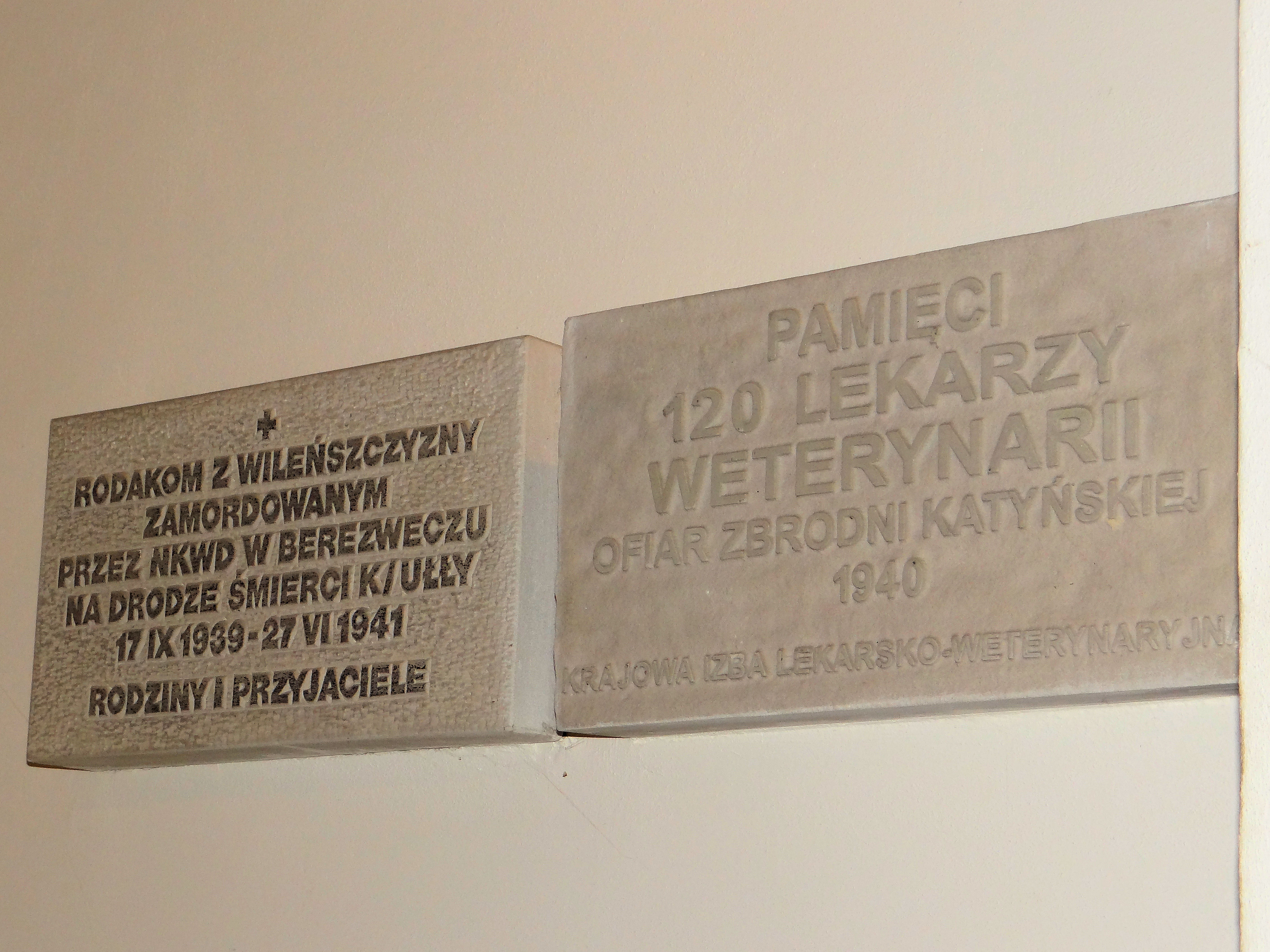
Holy Cross Church in Warsaw. On the left, a plaque commemorating the murdered prisoners from Berezwecz

Commemorating the victims of the "death road" became possible after the revolutions of 1989 and the dissolution of the Soviet Union. In the summer of 1993, families of the victims went on a pilgrimage to the places of execution in Berezwecz-Hlybokaye and Taklinovo-Mikalajeva. A mass was celebrated by the chaplain of the Federation of Katyn families, Fr. Zdzisław Peszkowski. Thanks to the efforts of the Council for the Protection of Struggle and Martyrdom Sites, a monument in honor of the murdered was erected on the mass grave in Mikalajeva.

In the Borek forest near Hlybokaye a monument commemorating the victims of the Stalinist and Nazi regimes, murdered in the Berezwecz prison, was erected.

Other forms of commemorating the victims of the "death road" include:

- a commemorative plaque in the church in Hlybokaye;
- a railway tie with the Polish inscription "Berezwecz Nikołajewo", which is part of the monument to the Fallen and Murdered in the East in Warsaw;
- a commemorative plaque and an urn with soil from Mikalajeva, located in the Basilica of the Holy Cross Church in Warsaw (in so-called Khatyn Chapel);
- the victims of Berezwecz-Taklinovo death road are commemorated in an inscription on a plaque dedicated to the NKVD prison massacre victims at St. Stanislaus Kostka Church in Warsaw.

The graves of prisoners murdered in the basements of the prison in Berezwecz, as well as on the way from Berezwecz to Taklinowo could not be found.

== Bibliography ==
- Kalbarczyk, Sławomir (2011-06-21). "Tysiąc ofiar z Berezwecza" [One thousand victims from Berezwecz]. Rzeczpospolita (in Polish). 144/2011. ISSN 0208-9130.
- Musiał, Bogdan (2001). Rozstrzelać elementy kontrrewolucyjne. Brutalizacja wojny niemiecko-sowieckiej latem 1941 roku [Shoot the counter-revolutionary elements. The brutalization of the German-Soviet war in the summer of 1941] (in Polish). Warszawa: Stowarzyszenie Kulturalne Fronda. ISBN 83-88747-40-1.
- Popiński, Krzysztof; Kokurin, Aleksandr; Gurjanow, Aleksandr (1995). Drogi śmierci. Ewakuacja więzień sowieckich z Kresów Wschodnich II Rzeczypospolitej w czerwcu i lipcu 1941 [Roads of death. Evacuation of Soviet prisons from the Eastern Borderlands of the Second Polish Republic in June and July 1941] (in Polish). Warszawa: Wydawnictwo "Karta". ISBN 83-900676-9-2.
- Zbrodnicza ewakuacja więzień i aresztów NKWD na Kresach Wschodnich II Rzeczypospolitej w czerwcu – lipcu 1941 roku. Materiały z sesji naukowej w 55. rocznicę ewakuacji więźniów NKWD w głąb ZSRR, Łódź 10 czerwca 1996 r. [Criminal evacuation of NKVD prisons and detention centers in the Eastern Borderlands of the Second Polish Republic in June–July 1941. Materials from the scientific session on the 55th anniversary of the evacuation of NKVD prisoners deep into the USSR, Łódź, June 10, 1996] (in Polish). Warszawa: Główna Komisja Badania Zbrodni przeciwko Narodowi Polskiemu – Instytut Pamięci Narodowej. 1997. ISBN 83-903356-6-2.
