= Petrasek =

Petrasek, Petrášek, or Petrásek are Slavic surnames. They originated from the diminutive for the given name or surname Petras/Petráš based on the given name Peter. Petrasek is a Germanized form of the Czech and Slovak surnames Petrášek/Petrásek. A diminutive may be used as a patronymic in these languages.

- David Petrasek (born 1976), Swedish ice hockey player
- Luke Petrasek, American basketball player
- Martin Petrásek (born 1983), Czech cross country skier
- Tomáš Petrášek (born 1992), Czech footballer
