= Petras (surname) =

Petras is a surname. Notable people with the surname include:

- Andjei Petras (born 1972), Russian composer
- Ernestine Petras (1924–2017), American baseball player
- Herb Petras, Canadian general
- James Petras (1937–2026), American sociologist
- Kim Petras (born 1992), German singer and songwriter
- Panagiotis Petras (born 1983), Greek footballer
- Spencer Petras (born 1999), American football player

== See also ==
- Petras (given name)
- Petráš, Slovak family name
