= Poškus =

- Lithuanian surname
- m.: Poškus
- f.: (unmarried): Poškutė
- f.: (married): Poškienė/Poškuvienė

Poškus is a Lithuanian language family name. It may refer to:

- Robertas Poškus, Lithuanian footballer
- Marius Poškus, Lithuanian footballer
- Petras Poškus, Lithuanian politician
