= Aleksandra Žvirblytė =

Lithuanian pianist

Aleksandra Žvirblytė is a Lithuanian pianist.

She graduated at the Lithuanian Academy of Music, completing her studies in Russian (1989-1991), German and Swiss Conservatories. She has performed internationally since. She was awarded with, respectively, a 2nd and a 3rd prize in the 1986 (inter-republical) and 1991 (international) editions of the Ciurlionis competition, and in 1999 she won the Paris' Nikolay Rubinstein competition.

Žvirblytė is an associated professor at the Lithuanian Academy of Music and Theatre.
