= Linda Maxey =

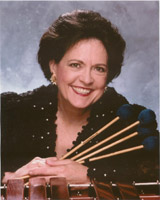
Linda Maxey, concert marimbist

Linda Maxey is a concert marimbist virtuoso and was the first marimbist presented by Community Concerts, a division of Columbia Artists Management in New York that presented concerts to a network of subscription audiences whose pooled resources attracted leading performers and ensembles.

== Artistry ==
Linda Maxey began studying piano at the age of four and marimba at age six. Her first major performance as a child was at Madison Square Garden in New York when she was eleven years old when she performed for the Kiwanis International Convention. A native of Longview, TX, she graduated from Longview High School in 1959. She later completed a Master of Music at the Eastman School of Music. She was a featured soloist at the Percussive Arts Society International Convention (PASIC) in Philadelphia (1990) and performed at PASIC in San Antonio (1988). She performed Michael Udow's Coyote Dreams on tour with the University of Michigan's Percussion Ensemble in 2001. She lectured on Management and the Soloist at PASIC in Dallas (2002). She presented ON STAGE: The Art of Performing at the Texas Music Educators Convention (TMEA) in 1999.

Her New York debut was in 1990 at the Weill Recital Hall of Carnegie Hall. She was a featured artist at the 2007 Cross Drum International Percussion Festival in Warsaw, at the 1999 Journees de la Percussion International Percussion Festival in Paris, and the Fontana Chamber Music Festival in Michigan (2005, 2003, 2000), and was the first marimbist to perform at the Ameropa Chamber Music Festival in Prague in 2002, and also at the International Festival de Musica in Portugal in 1994. She received two Fulbright Senior Scholar Awards, an Arts Link Award, and a grant from The Fund for U.S. Artists at International Festivals and Exhibitions.

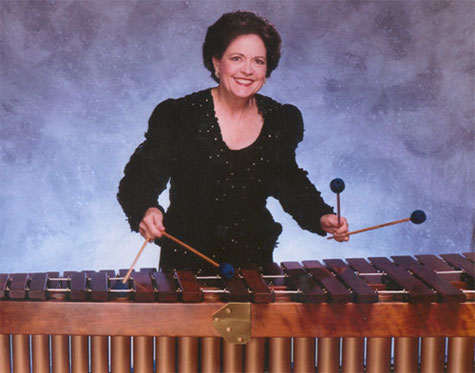
Linda Maxey with Marimba

Linda Maxey has presented clinics and master classes at major universities throughout the United States and in Paris, Prague, St. Petersburg, Warsaw, Minsk, The Baltic States, Sweden, and the Netherlands. She has been a featured artist/clinician at Days of Percussion in the United States and Europe and hosted an international percussion festival in Vilnius, Lithuania in 2002. She has performed on National Public Radio and appeared on television in the United States and in Europe. She developed the MPM 3-octave practice marimba (Maxey Practice Marimba), a portable marimba-width keyboard designed for beginning students marketed by Marimba Warehouse. She has held academic appointments at the University of Missouri Conservatory of Music in Kansas City, Baylor University, Long Beach City College, the University of Kansas and the Lithuanian Academy of Music, which awarded her an honorary doctorate degree (2002). Her articles on interpreting music, artist and management, and the art of performing have appeared in Percussive Notes magazine. Many of her transcriptions for marimba have been published by Southern Music Company, and her arrangement of Rhapsody in Blue for marimba and piano was published in 2007 by Alfred Publishing Company.

== Lithuania Academy of Music ==
"Music brings people of different cultures together- there is a bond and understanding that develops among musicians, and that's very important, especially in maintaining world peace," Maxey said.

Since 1995, she has established a scholarship fund at the Lithuanian Academy of Music and an exchange program for students and professors between the Academy and various U.S. institutions. Lithuania was the first country to declare independence from the Soviet Union in 1990. Still, because it had remained isolated from contact with other nations, the country's music professionals had not necessarily experienced the advancements of the percussion world. Her contributions to the Academy include updating the percussion curriculum, introducing new developments in percussion techniques, and facilitating exchanges with guest clinicians as "cultural ambassadors" of jazz and percussion to join her in teaching. Within the last decade, the Academy has become one of the leaders in percussion studies in Eastern Europe.

== Recordings and arrangements ==
Linda Maxey can be heard on the soundtrack of the Kennedy Center's Children Opera, The Emperor's New Clothes (2002), on her solo CD The Artistry of the Marimba, as a soloist in Ney Rosauro's Concerto for Marimba with the Lithuanian St. Christopher's Chamber Orchestra in their CD Josef HAYDN, Nay ROSAURO, Carl NIELSEN, and on the CD XIII Festival de Musica de Figueira da Foz, Portugal. In addition to Columbia Artists, Ms. Maxey has toured for Arts Midwest and Heartland Arts, the U.S. Department of Defense, and is on the artist roster of Innovative Percussion, Inc.

Maxey has arranged George Gershwin's legendary "Rhapsody in Blue" for marimba and piano for Alfred Music Publishing.
