= Sts. Apostles Peter and Paul Church and Basilian Monastery =

Coordinates: 55°08′23″N 27°42′22″E

The Sts. Apostles Peter and Paul Church and Basilian Monastery in Berezwecz was a historic sacred structure in what is today Hlybokaye, Belarus. The church and monastery began with a foundation in 1637 by Joseph Korsak, the voivode of Mścisław. Run by the Order of Saint Basil the Great, the church and monastery were rebuilt in 1750-67 according to a design by Johann Christoph Glaubitz. A widely admired example of Vilnian Baroque the structure's facade was constructed of nine convex and eight concave surfaces.

Berezwecz along with the rest of the Grand Duchy of Lithuania became part of the Russian Empire after the partitions of Poland. In the aftermath of the November Uprising, the Basilian Order was in 1839, the monastery in the second half of the nineteenth century turned into an Orthodox monastery.

After World War I when Poland regained its independence, the church and monastery were returned to the Catholic Church. After the invasion of Poland in September 1939 started World War II, the area was incorporated into the Soviet Union. The NKVD the prison set up a prison. Not unlike other areas under Soviet rule in occupied Poland, Berezwecz was the location of a massacre of up to 2,000–3,000 Polish prisoners by the Soviet NKVD secret police. As late as 2009 the remains of more than 20 victims probably shot by NKVD after the takeover of the area from Poland were again discovered.

Berezwecz was annexed into Hlybokaye under Soviet rule. While the monastery building still survives as a prison, the church was destroyed in 1970 on the order of Soviet authorities.

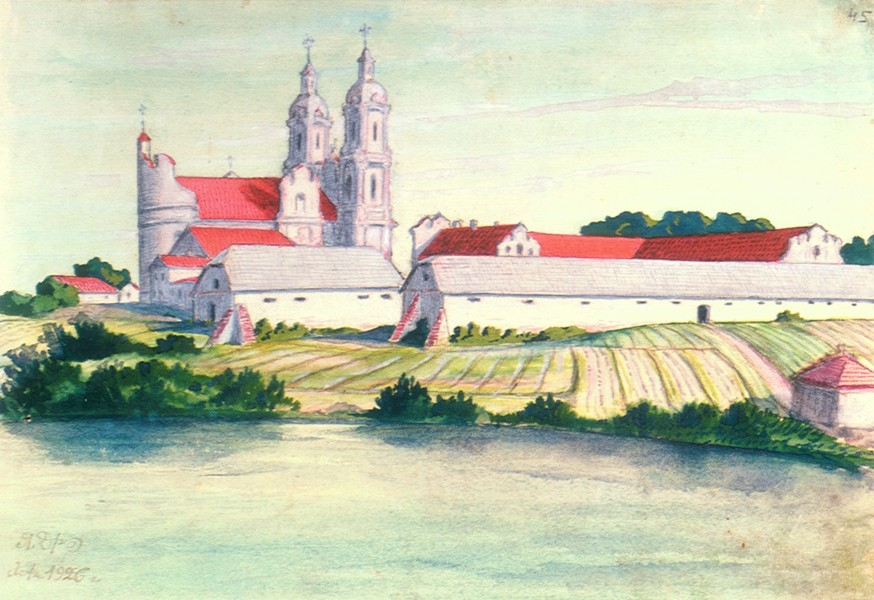
Church and Monastery on a painting by Józef Drozdowicz from 1926

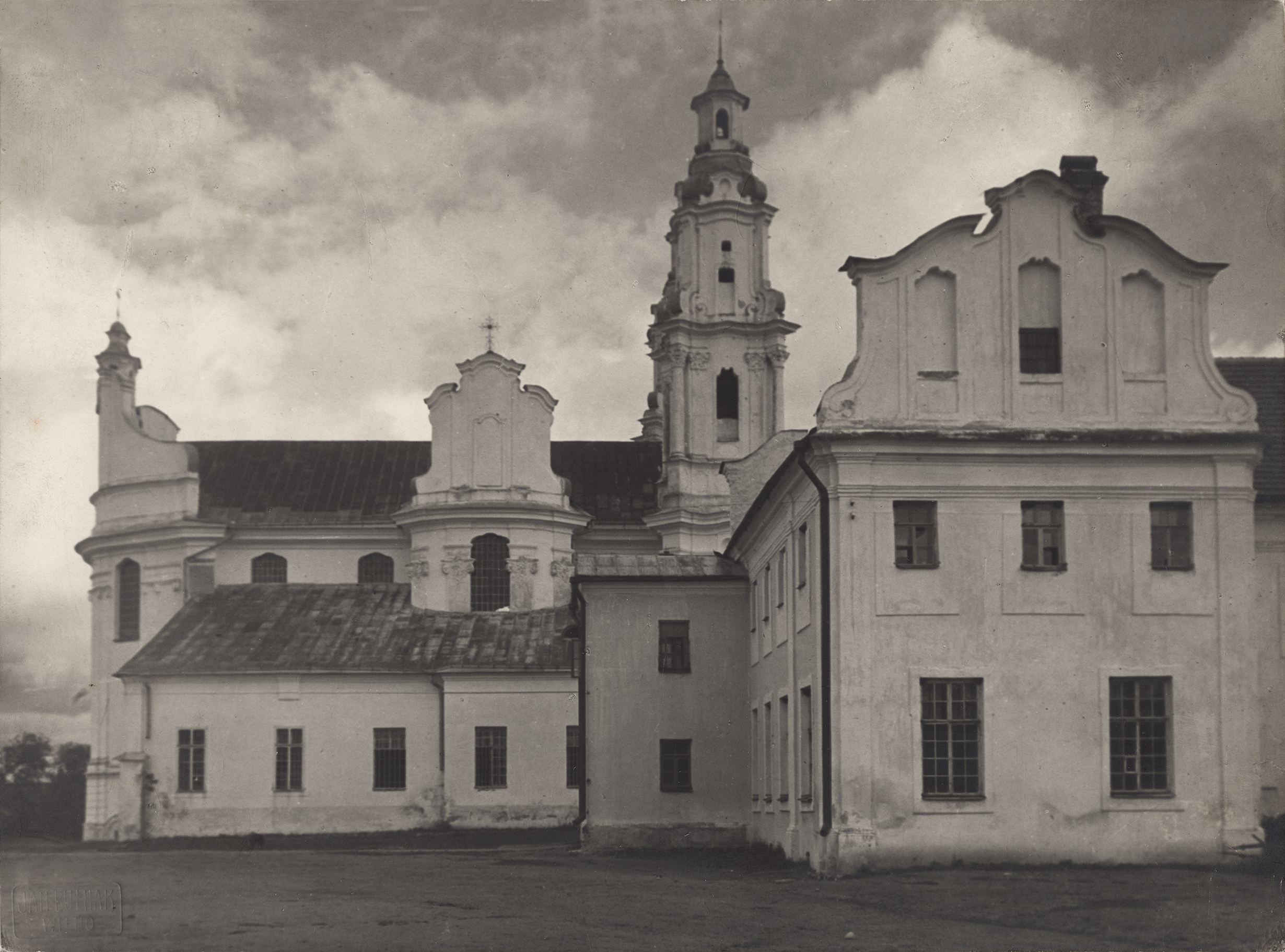
Side view of the church and part of the monastery in the 1930s by Jan Bułhak

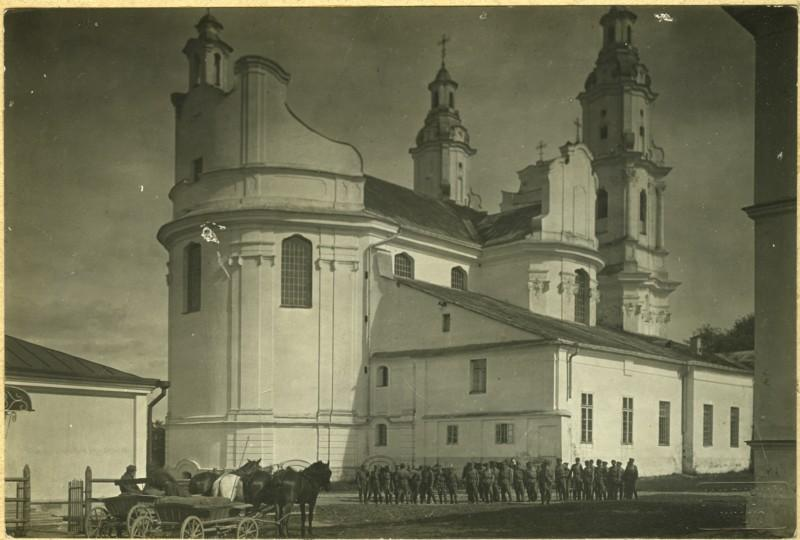
Church exterior in the 1930s shot by Jan Bułhak

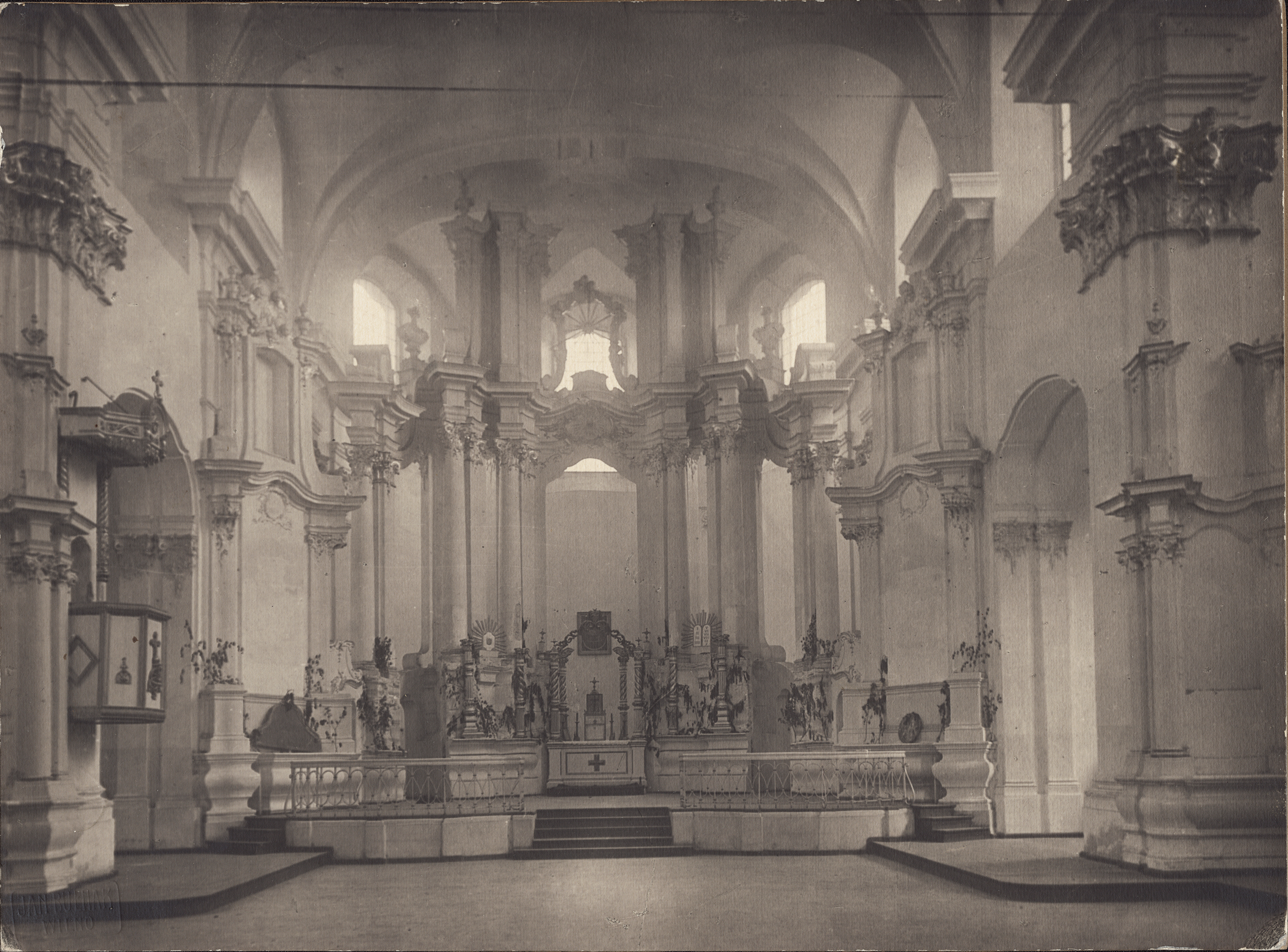
Church interior from a photograph by Jan Bułhak
