= Jascha Heifetz Competition =

International violinists competition

International Jascha Heifetz Competition is a competition for violinists of all nationalities, which is held in Lithuania. The first International Jascha Heifetz Competition for Violinists was held in 2001, commemorating the 100th anniversary of the birth of violinist Jascha Heifetz. The competition was organised by the Lithuanian Cultural Foundation together with the Lithuanian Academy of Music and Theatre. Currently the competition is organised by Public Institution Natų knygynas together with Lithuanian Academy of Music and Theatre. Main supporters of the competition are the Lithuanian Council for Culture and the Ministry of Culture of the Republic of Lithuania.

The competition takes place every four years. The participants that pass the preliminary round are evaluated by an international jury.

== Past winners ==
2001	Jaroslav Nadrzycki (Poland)
2005	Lisa Jacobs (The Netherlands)
2009	Sergey Malov (Russia)
2013	Maya Kanagawa (United States)
2017	Yurina Arai (Japan)
2020	Javier Comesaña (Spain)
