= Jan Bułhak =

Polish photographer (1876–1950)

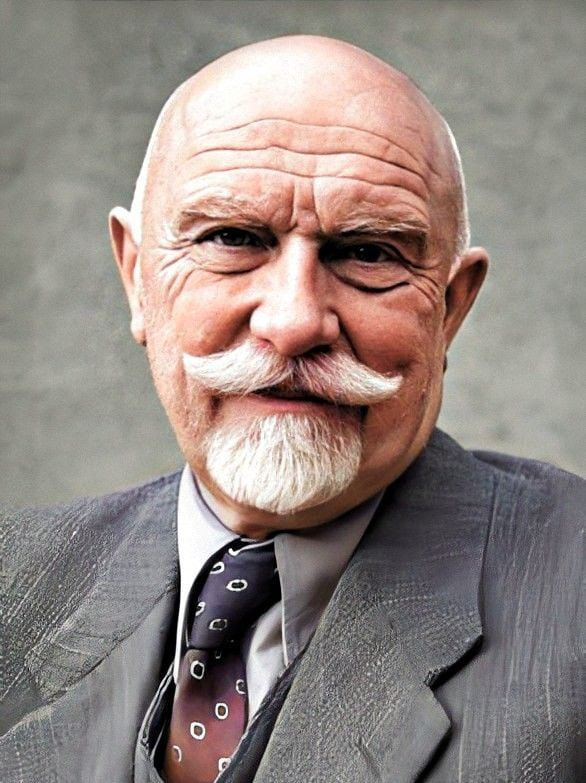
- Born: October 6, 1876; Ostaszyn, Russian Empire
- Died: February 4, 1950 (aged 73), Giżycko, Poland
- Resting place: Powązki Cemetery, Warsaw
- Known for: Photography
- Style: Pictorialism
- Children: Janusz Bułhak

Jan Brunon Bułhak (1876–1950) was an early 20th century photographer in Poland and present-day Belarus and Lithuania. A published theoretician and philosopher of photography, he was an exponent of pictorialism. He is best known for his landscapes and photographs of various places, especially the city of Vilnius. He was the founder of the Wilno Photoclub and Polish Photoclub, the predecessors of the modern Union of Polish Art Photographers (ZPAF), of which he was an honorary office-holder. He is also known as an ethnographer and folklorist.

== Biography ==
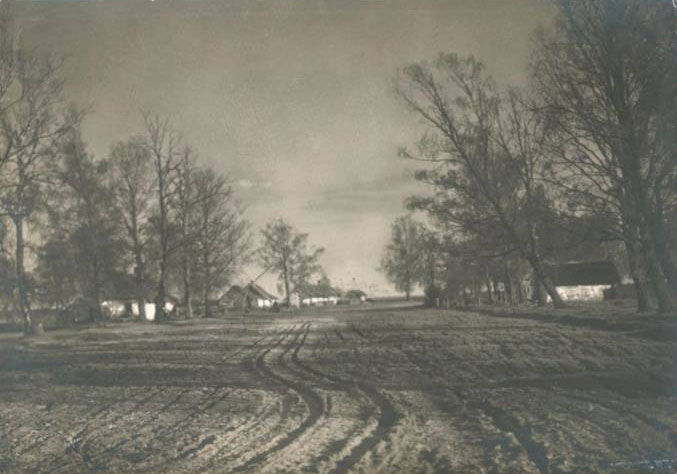
Wiłkomierz

Jan Bułhak was born on October 6, 1876, in Ostaszyn (Belarusian: Асташын), near Navahrudak (Belarusian: Навагрудак), Russian Empire (now Belarus). His parents were Walery Antoni Stanisław Bułhak of Syrokomla and Józefa née Haciska of Roch, both local landowners in Ostaszyn. In the village of Worończa (Belarusian: Варонча) near Navahrudak, not far from St. Ann's Roman Catholic church (Belarusian: Касцёл св. Ганны), there are four graves of Jan Bułhak's ancestors.

In 1888, Jan entered a gymnasium (a pre-Revolution secondary public school of the Russian Empire) in Wilno (present-day Vilnius), finishing it in 1897. From 1897 to 1899, he studied literature, history and philosophy at Jagiellonian University, Kraków, but did not graduate because of lack of money. Returning home, he lived in the village of Peresieka (Belarusian: Пярэсека) near Minsk, where he inherited a manor after his great-uncle's death. From there, Bułhak sent news stories to Wilno newspapers. In 1901, he married a cousin, Hanna Haciska. After his father's death, he sold the manor and bought a mansion from the Radziwiłłs in Belitsa, near Minsk. On April 27, 1906, the couple had a son, Janusz Bułhak, who would become a composer and a photographer.

== Photography ==
=== Beginning ===
Jan Bułhak grew interested in photography quite by chance in 1905, when his wife was given a camera. The same year, he took his first pictures: portraits, landscapes, environs. In the beginning, he was advised by Bolesław Ignacy Domeyko, a Navahrudak photographer, who helped him in the basics of photography.

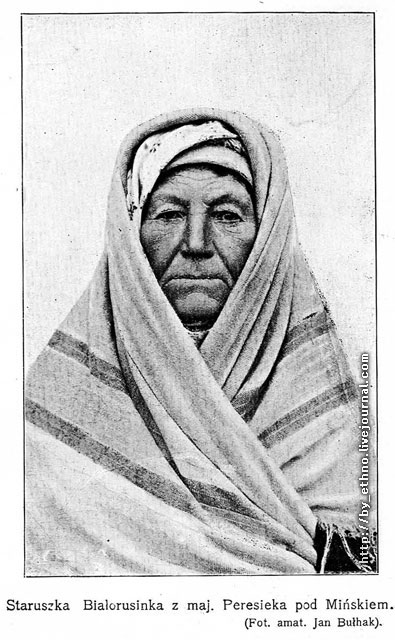
Old Belarusian woman from the estate near Minsk (1910)

In 1908, he created a darkroom of his own in Peresieka. That December, he made his debut and won the main award at a photo competition run by Życie Ilustrowane ("Illustrated Life"), a weekly supplement to Kurier Litewski ("Lithuanian Courier").

=== First successes ===
In 1910, Jan Bułhak participated for the first time in the World Photo Exhibition in Brussels. He corresponded with the Paris Photoclub and the French photographers Emil J. Constant Puyo, Robert de la Sizeranne, and Léonard Misonne. Two issues of the Berlin Photographische Mitteilungen ("Photographic News") in 1910 contained his pictures. Bułhak sent his pictures and news stories to the Warsaw magazine Ziemia ("Earth") as well as to the Polish Local Lore society. He published many translations and articles in Polish magazines and inculcated the aesthetics of Pictorialism in the minds of his readers.

From November 1910, Bułhak regularly contributed his writings on photography to the monthly Fotograf Warszawski ("Warsaw Photographer"). He also soon began contributing to Tygodnik Wileński ("Vilnius Weekly") (up to 1939), and Deutscher Almanach ("German Almanac").

In 1911, Bułhak organized a photo-exhibition in Minsk. He participated in a photo exhibition in Ciechocinek, Poland; and received an honorary diploma in the category of artistic portraits at a contest in Antwerp.

=== Professional work ===
Fotographika really sticks from the rest of photo books, due to the solid, print form, manifested not too much in the pictorial and impressionist styles of photography art, but in layouts of books. The book shows Jan Bulhak as a person that a father figure to generations of photography beginners looking to practice and aspired the called artists, as well as offering interesting contribution to reflection on the image of the artists. Jan Bulhak could also be considered as a prominent producer when it came to the concept of self-promotion and entrepreneurial organization of a photographer's activity.

==== Acquaintance with Ferdynand Ruszczyc ====
It was Bułhak's publication in Fotograf Warszawski in 1910 that drew the attention of Ferdynand Ruszczyc, a Polish painter, printmaker, and a professor at the Fine Arts Department of the Stefan Batory University (now Vilnius University); and it was Ruszczyc who helped Bułhak move to Vilnius.

Later, Ruszczyc had an appreciable influence upon him as photographer. Though Bułhak's views on art, inspired by French aestheticians, had already formed, Ruszczyc helped to turn the amateur photographer into a professional: the painter taught him some specific techniques of composition to perceive nature and architecture.

==== Study in Germany ====
After this Bułhak studied photography in Dresden, Germany, where he received some practical tutoring from the German portrait-painter Hugo Erfurth. He also visited various Dresden societies, where he became acquainted with the symbolists and impressionists.

==== Start at Vilnius ====
In 1911, Ruszczyc suggested that the Vilnius Magistrate (city council) should create the position of "city photographer", and Bułhak was asked to take it. Thus, Bułhak became the Vilnius city photographer, and photography became his main business.

In 1912, he opened a photographic studio at 12 Portovaya Street, Vilnius. At the request of the Vilnius Magistrate and in cooperation with the municipal curator, Bułhak started making a "photographic inventory" of the city and took pictures of its historic landmarks from 1912 to 1915.

==== Vilnius period ====
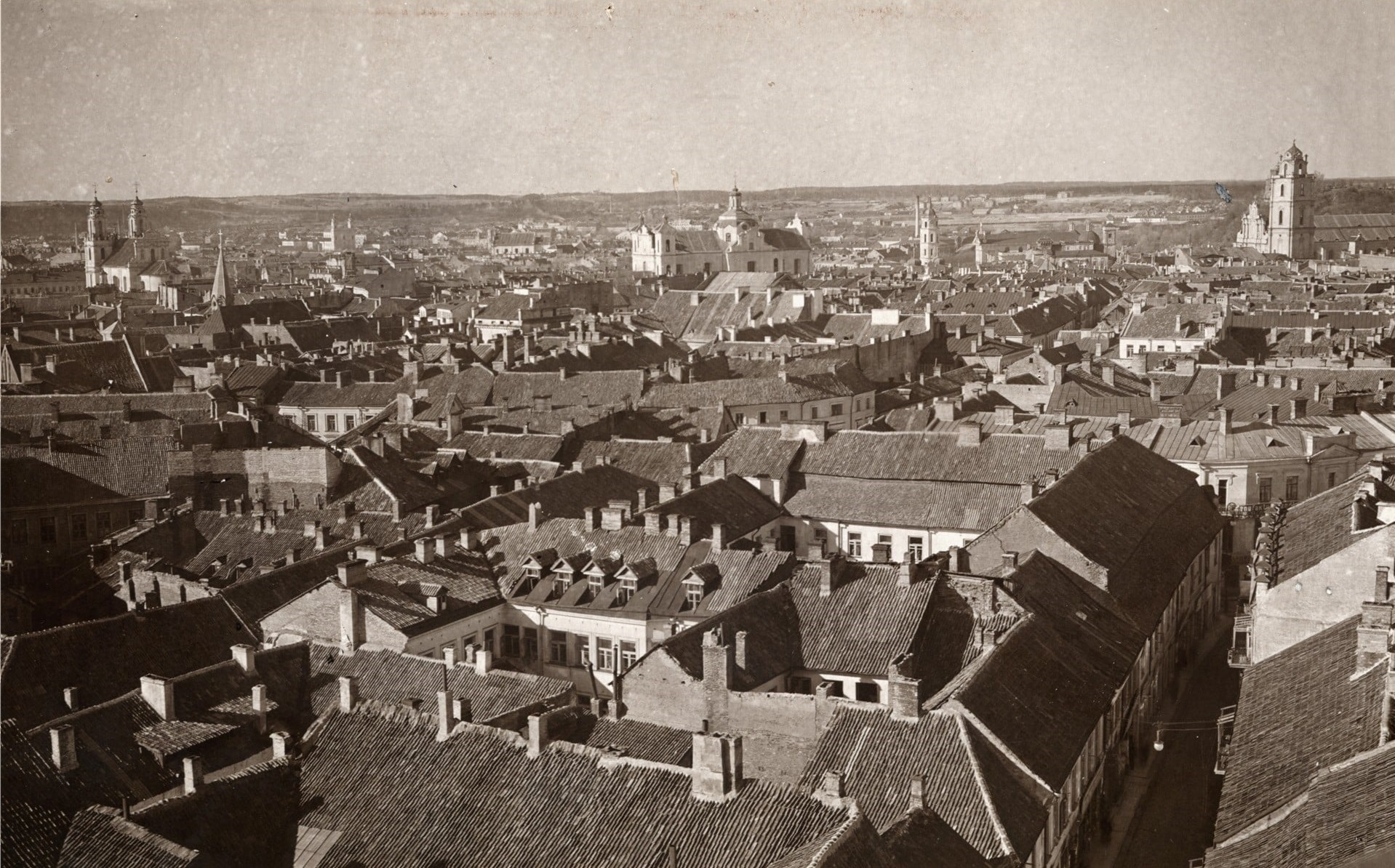
Panorama of the Vilnius Old Town, 1944

The major part of Bułhak's work is connected with Vilnius and its surroundings; he also documented the monuments and landscapes of some other parts of Poland: Warsaw, Kraków, Hrodna, Lublin, and so on. Bułhak sent a series of his photos to the Vestnik fotografii ("Photo Bulletin", Russian: «Вестник фотографии») magazine, which he co-operated with from 1913 to 1914. In Bułhak's house in Eliza Orzeszkowa street, a collection of twelve thousand pictures was stored, most of them taken from 1912 to 1915.

From 1919, with Ruszczyc's help and encouragement, Bułhak started lecturing on artistic photography at the Fine Arts Department of the Stefan Batory University; he would continue until 1939.

In 1919, he became one of the founders and the chairman of the Vilnius Photoclub (Polish: Fotoklub Wileński) (other sources say that he founded the photoclub and had headed it since 1927); and headed it until the start of World War II. He and Marian Dederko were the founders of the Polish Photoclub (Polish: Fotoklub Polski) in 1929 or 1930.

From 1919 to 1939, Jan Bułhak headed the photographic section (workshop) of the Fine Arts Department of Stefan Batory University in Vilnius.

From 1935 to 1939, he was one of the editors of the magazines Przegląd Fotograficzny ("Photographic Review") and Fotograf Polski ("Polish Photographer").

In 1939, the collection titled Polska w obrazach fotograficznych Jana Bułhaka ("Poland in Jan Bułhak’s photographic pictures") contained over 11,000 photos arranged into 158 subject albums: Vilnius, Kresy, Volhynia, Lviv, Warsaw, Kraków, Poznań, Pomerania, Gdańsk, Nowogródek Voivodeship and others. By World War II, Bułhak had taken between 40,000 and 100,000 photographs. In 1939, he presented the collection to the Polish state, but most of these negatives perished during the war.

Under the occupation during World War II, Jan Bułhak together with his son continued to photograph the destruction of many places in what was then Poland.

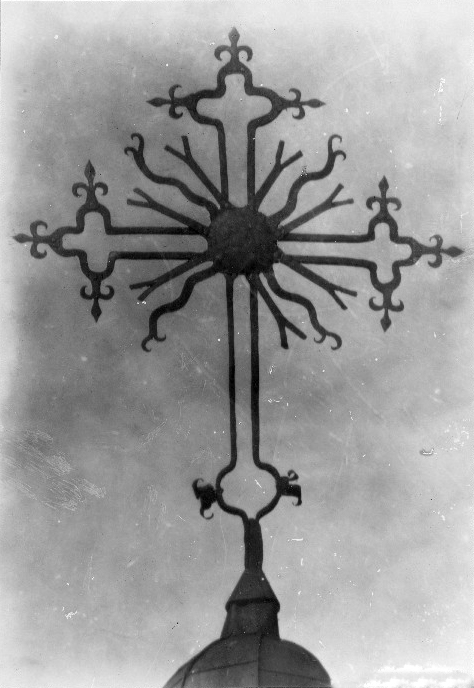
Chapel in Mohiłki (1931)

=== Last years ===
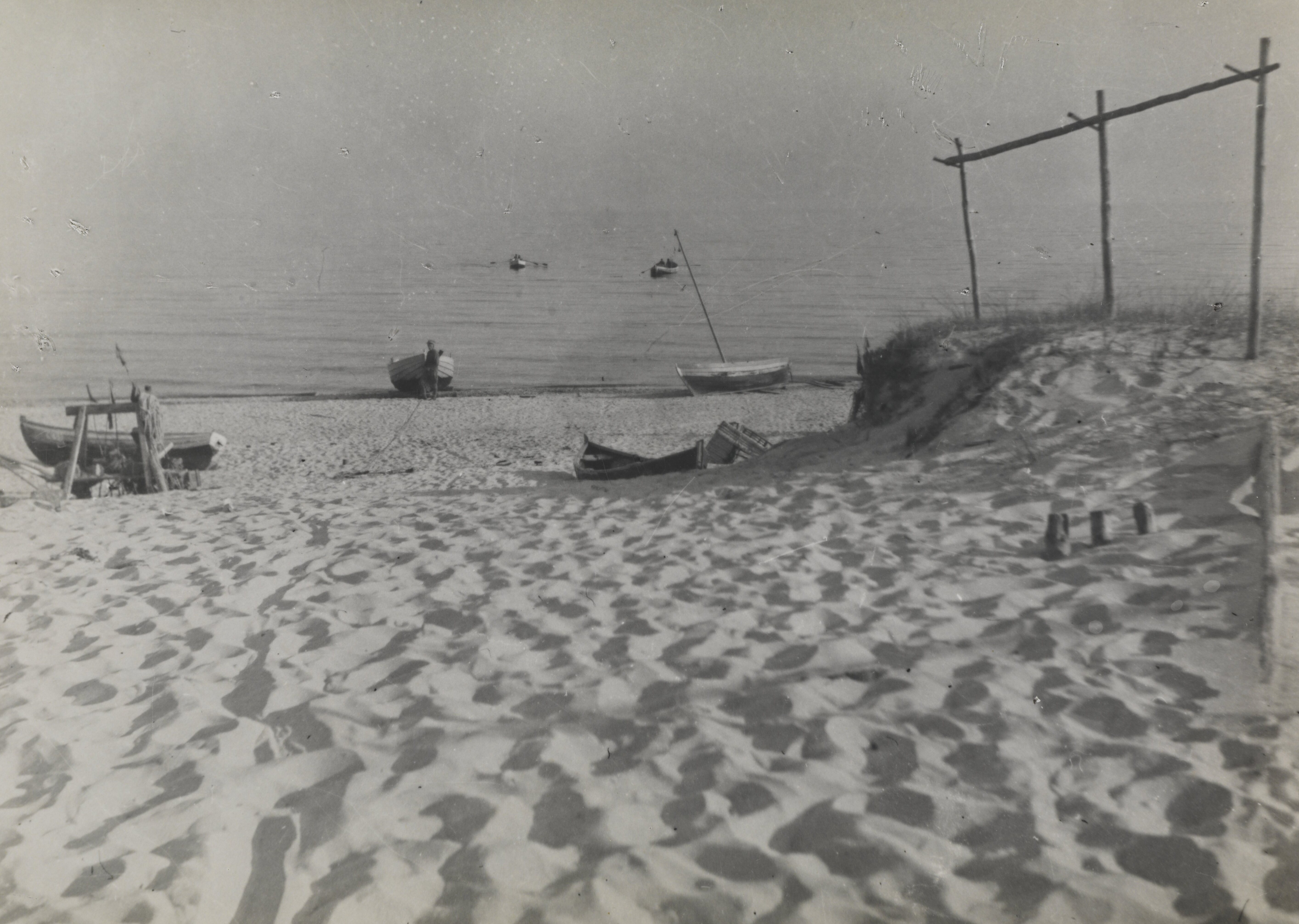
Międzyzdroje Beach (1945)

In 1944, after bombardments, Bułhak's studio in Vilnius burned down; about 30 thousand negatives perished, but some were spared.

After World War II, in July 1945, he resettled in Warsaw. There, he took about a thousand photographs of destroyed and restored Warsaw, and about two thousand of the western land attached to Poland.

Though Jan Bułhak's son Janusz studied music at the Vilnius Conservatory, the father taught him photography, so Janusz joined him in 1940s and all photographs made from 1945 to 1949 are signed "Jan Bułhak and son".

In 1946, in Warsaw, with help from Stanisław Lorentz, the director of Muzeum Narodowe w Warszawie (the National Museum), the first postwar exhibition by Jan Bułhak took place: Warszawa 1945 roku w obrazach fotograficznych Jana Bułhaka ("Warsaw of 1945 in Jan Bułhak's Photographic Images").

In 1946, he and Leonard Sempoliński became founders of the revived Union of Polish Pictorialists (Polish: Związek Polskich Artystów Fotografików), the successor to the Polish Photoclub, and headed it until his death. His member card was number 1.

Bułhak took part in more than 170 international exhibitions, and received a number of high awards. For his photograph titled Radość życia ("Joy of Life"), which shows a shaded room with sun rays entering, he received the Golden Medal at the International Photographic Show (Polish: X Międzynarodowy Salon Fotografii Artystycznej) in Warsaw in 1937.

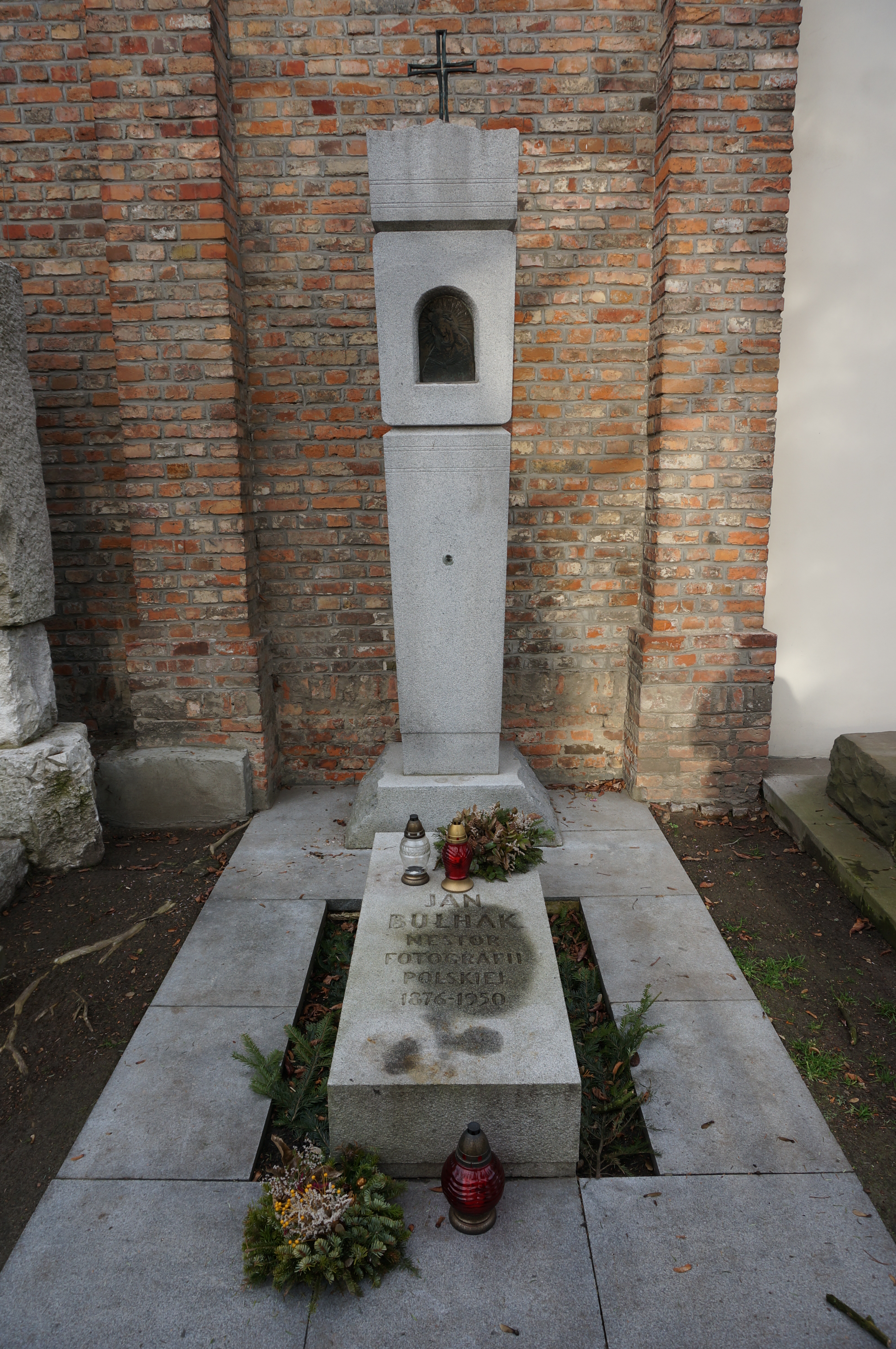
Jan Bułhak's grave.

He died suddenly in Giżycko during a photographic excursion on February 4, 1950.

== Creative output ==
Jan Bułhak became famous and popular for his pictures of Vilnius and its vicinity, and other towns and countryside of what is now Lithuania. In the words of Tomas Venclova:

Bułhak's portrayal of Vilnius and its environs is not just documentary: reminiscent of impressionist paintings, his valuable artistic photographs reflect the particular aura of the Old Town and its surrounding landscape. His image of the city has survived in the consciousness of several generations and has become one of the city's myths.

In the estimation of Laimonas Briedis:

[Bułhak] spoke of and, in his mesmerising black-and-white prints, attempted to capture [Wilno's] sinuous nature. Bułhak placed the city onto the fluid landscape of a human soul, and made it a challenge to the hardened, familiar parameters of European time and space.

Bułhak wrote a number of books on the technique and art of photography, memoirs of Ferdynand Ruszczyc (1939), and also some poems and short stories. He published a series of albums, Wędrówki fotografa ("Photographer's Travels") (I–IX, 1931–1936). His photographs are used to illustrate a city guidebook by Juliusz Kłos, a book about Wilno by Jerzy Remer, and other publications.

Jan Bułhak's creativity had a great influence on the development of Lithuanian art photography. Practically all of Vilnius pictorialists adopted his views on art. This influence helped advance photography in the Vilnius area, Western Belarus, and all of Poland.

Photographs by Jan Bułhak are in many Polish institutions, including the National Museum in Warsaw, the Warsaw Institute of Arts, the Museum of Fine Arts in Łódź, the National Library of Poland, and the Walery Rzewuski Museum of History of Photography in Kraków. Some photographs are in the collections of the Canadian Centre for Architecture and the Iris & B. Gerald Cantor Center for Visual Arts at Stanford University (California).

There are four nations that consider Jan Bułhak an outstanding person of their own: Poland (he was from a Polish family), Belarus (he was born and lived in the Belarusian land for some time), Lithuania (he long lived and worked in Vilnius), and Russia (whose empire encompassed the former three).

Digital Collections

In October 2013, the University at Buffalo Libraries announced the Jan Bulhak Collection. This digital collection consists of 116 of Bulhak's photographs, mainly from Warsaw, Kraków and the Kresy region. Originally, the collection of photographs was donated to the Polish Room at the University at Buffalo in 1955 by John M. Walczak. The Jan Bulhak Collection was also integrated into the history mapping website Historypin.

== Books of works by Bułhak ==
- Lithuania in Photographs by Jan Bulhak (270 photos in six albums), 1915.
- Wilna, Eine Vergessene Kunststatte ("Wilno Forgotten Art"). Published by the German 10th Army, Wilno, 1917. (in German)
- Moja ziemia ("My Land"). Wilno, 1919. (in Polish) OCLC 030680125
- Vilniaus reginiai ("Sights of Vilnius"). Vilnius, 1921. (in Lithuanian) OCLC 071756776
- Wilno. Wilno, 1924 (in Polish and English) OCLC 221756784
- Album Ostrobramskie ("Ostra Brama Album"). (Co-authored with Mieczysław Limanowski.) Wilno, 1927. (in Polish) OCLC 020243268
- Polska w krajobrazie i zabytkach, Vol. 1 ("Polish Landscapes and Landmarks"). (Co-authored with Marian Zaruski, et al.) Warsaw, 1930. (in Polish) OCLC 749823082
- Polska w krajobrazie i zabytkach, Vol. 2 (Joint work.) Warsaw, 1931. (in Polish) OCLC 749482319
- Fotografika. Zarys fotografii artystycznej ("Fine Art Photography. Outline"). Warsaw, 1931. (in Polish)
- Krajobraz wileński ("Vilnius Landscape"). Wilno, 1931. (in Polish)
- Wędrówki fotografa ("Photographer's Travels") Parts 1–4. Wilno, 1931–36. (in Polish)
- Technika bromowa ("Bromide Technique"). Wilno, 1933. (in Polish)
- Bromografika ("Bromography"). 1934. (in Polish)
- Estetyka światła ("Aesthetics of Light"). Wilno, 1936. (in Polish)
- Polska fotografia ojczysta ("Native Polish Photography"). Poznań, 1938 / 1951. (in Polish)
- 26 lat z Ferdynandem Ruszczycem ("26 Years with Ferdynand Ruszczyc"). Wilno, 1939. (in Polish)
- Fotografia ojczysta ("Native Photography"). Wrocław, 1951. (in Polish) OCLC 037936537
- Vilnius Baroque: Ninety Architectural Photographs from 1912 to 1916. Vilnius: E. Karpavicius, 2003. ISBN 9955-9650-0-2. (in English)
- Vozera Svitsiaz': Fotaalʹbom (Belarusian: Возера Свіцязь) = Jezioro Switeź = Svitiaz Lake (Photo album.) Minsk, 2003. ISBN 9850104813. (in Belarusian, English, and Polish)
- Kraj lat dziecinnych ("Land of Childhood"). Gdynia: ASP Rymsza, 2003. About the Navahrudak area. (in Polish and Belarusian) OCLC 069596098
- Krai dzitsiachykh hadou / Jan Bułhak (Belarusian: Край дзіцячых гадоў) ("Land of Childhood"; translation from Polish). Minsk, Belarus, 2004. ISBN 9850105380 (Bel) / ISBN 8391858006 (Pol). (in Belarusian)
- Vilniaus peizažas: Fotografo kelionės ("Vilnius Landscapes. Photographer's Travels"). Vilnius: Vaga, 2006. ISBN 5415019294. (in Lithuanian)
