= Monument to the Fallen and Murdered in the East =

- Pomnik Poległym i Pomordowanym na Wschodzie
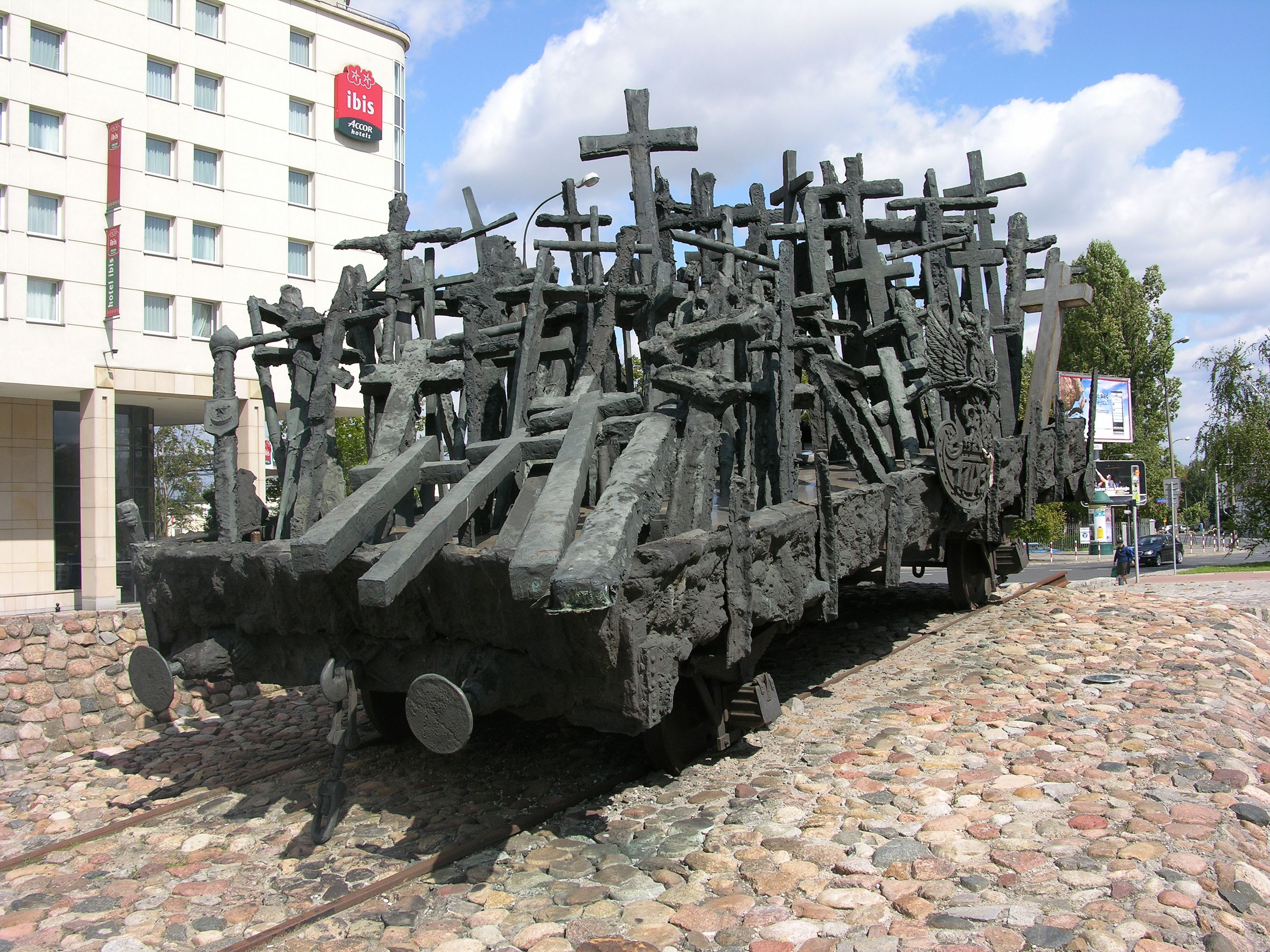
- The monument in Warsaw
- Interactive map of Monument to the Fallen and Murdered in the East
- Location: Warsaw
- Coordinates: 52°15′13.55″N 20°59′56″E
- Designer: Maksymilian Biskupski
- Material: Bronze sculpture
- Height: 7 metres (23 ft)
- Completion date: 17 September 1995
- Dedicated to: Victims of the Soviet repressions of Polish citizens (1939–46)

The Monument to the Fallen and Murdered in the East is a monument in Warsaw, Poland which commemorates the victims of the Soviet invasion of Poland during World War II and subsequent repressions. It was unveiled on 17 September 1995, on the 56th anniversary of the Soviet invasion of 1939.

== History ==
During the era of the People's Republic of Poland, the Polish communist authorities colluded with the Soviet Union to censor information about the Soviet invasion of Poland in 1939 and repressions carried out against the Polish population during the period of Soviet occupation from 1939 - 1941, as well as subsequent repressions following the Soviet takeover of Poland in 1944-5, in particular - denying Soviet culpability for the Katyn massacre of 1940. After the fall of the communist governments in Central and Eastern Europe in 1989, the new authorities in Poland officially endorsed a project to create a number of monuments and memorials commemorating those events.

The Monument to the Fallen and Murdered in the East was designed by Maksymilian Biskupski and is located at the intersection of Muranowska and General Władysław Anders streets in Warsaw. Biskupski designed the monument in 1991, construction began on 18 August 1995, and it was officially unveiled on 17 September 1995 - the 56th anniversary of the Soviet invasion of 1939. Attending the unveiling ceremony were the Primate of Poland Józef Glemp, Chief of General Staff of the Polish Army Tadeusz Wilecki, President of Warsaw Marcin Święcicki, Prime Minister of Poland Józef Oleksy and President of Poland Lech Wałęsa. The monument's construction was underwritten by the Polish government, non-governmental organizations, and private individuals.

== Description ==
The monument was erected in honour of Poles killed and murdered in the East, in particular those deported to labour camps in Siberia (after the Soviet invasion of Poland) and the victims of the Katyn massacre. It is approximately 7 metres (23 ft) tall and is made out of bronze. The statue shows a pile of religious symbols (Catholic and Orthodox crosses as well as Jewish and Muslim symbols) on a railway flatcar, which is set on tracks. Each railway sleeper displays the names of places from which Polish citizens were deported for use as forced labourers in the USSR, and the names of the camps, collective farms, exile villages and various outposts of the gulag that were their destinations, including the mass murder sites used by the Soviet NKVD.

One of the crosses commemorates the priest Stefan Niedzielak, a Katyn activist who was murdered in mysterious circumstances in 1989. The monument also includes the Polish Cross of Valour and a Polish eagle with rope around it and the date of the Soviet invasion of Poland displayed underneath. The monument bears two inscriptions: Poległym pomordowanym na Wschodzie ("For those fallen in the East"), and ofiarom agresji sowieckiej 17.IX.1939. Naród 17.IX.1995 ("For the victims of Soviet aggression 17.IX.1939. The Polish nation 17.IX.1995").

== Memorial ceremony and papal visits ==
An annual memorial ceremony is held at the monument on 17 September.

Pope John Paul II prayed here during his seventh Polish pilgrimage in 1999. In 2006, during his pilgrimage to Poland, Pope Benedict XVI's popemobile was also taken past this monument (among others) on the way from the airport to Warsaw's cathedral.

== See also ==
- War crimes in occupied Poland during World War II
- Territories of Poland annexed by the Soviet Union
- Polish prisoners-of-war in the Soviet Union after 1939
- Poles in the Soviet Union
- Gestapo–NKVD Conferences
- Katyn massacre
- Bykivnia Graves
- NKVD prisoner massacres
- Sybirak
- Gulag
- List of World War II prisoner-of-war camps in the Soviet Union

== Gallery ==
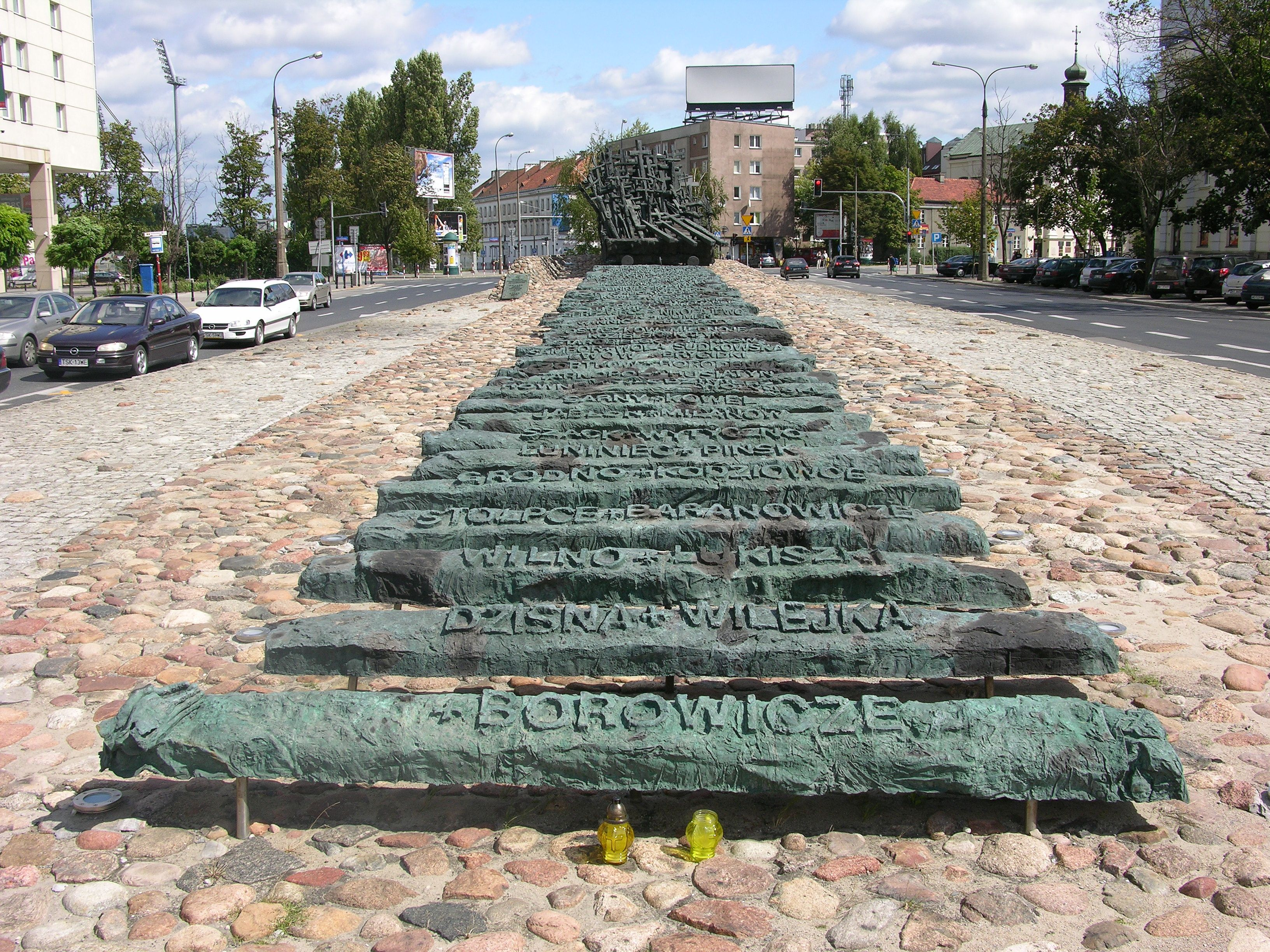
The monument viewed from the west

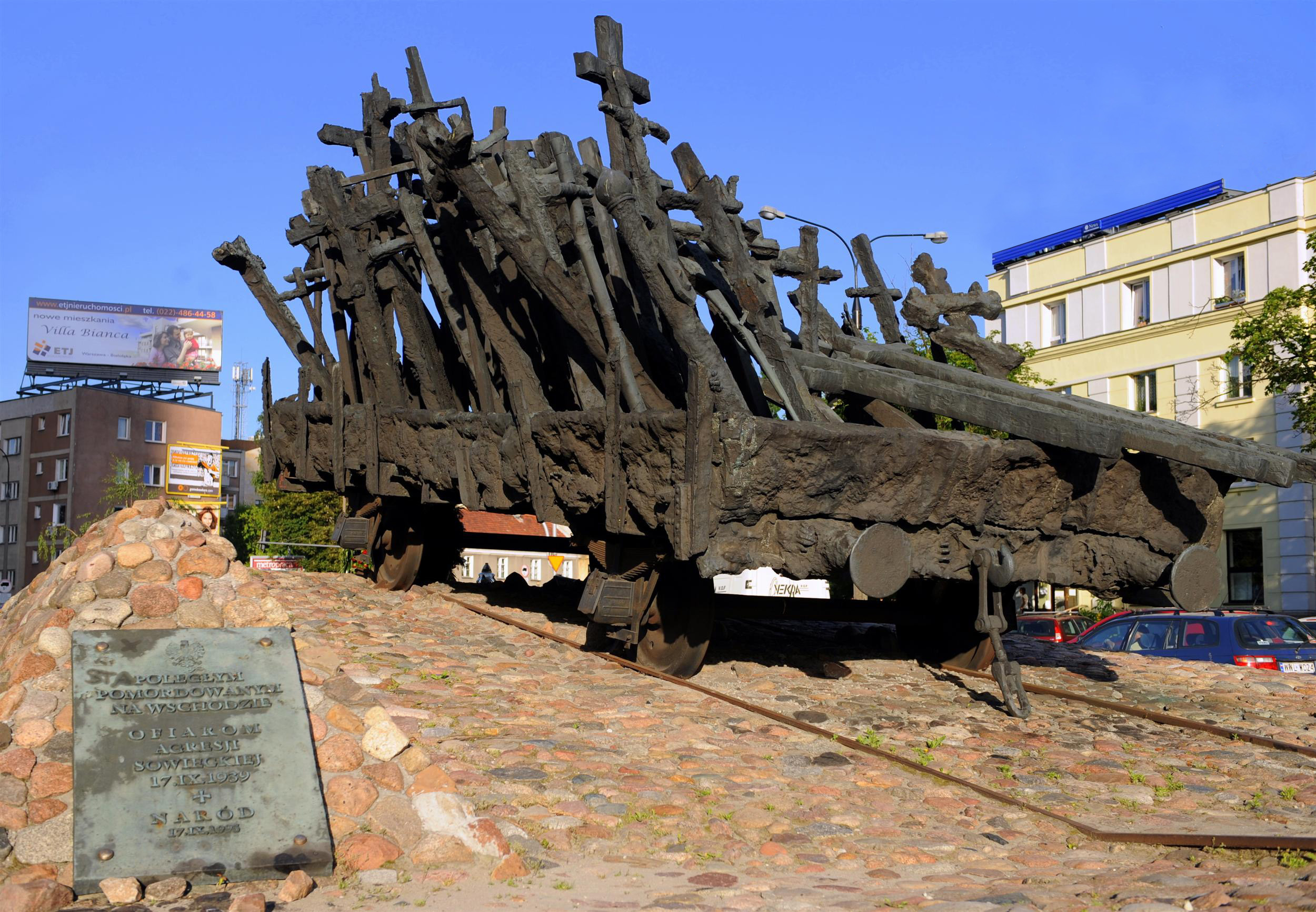
The railway flatcar

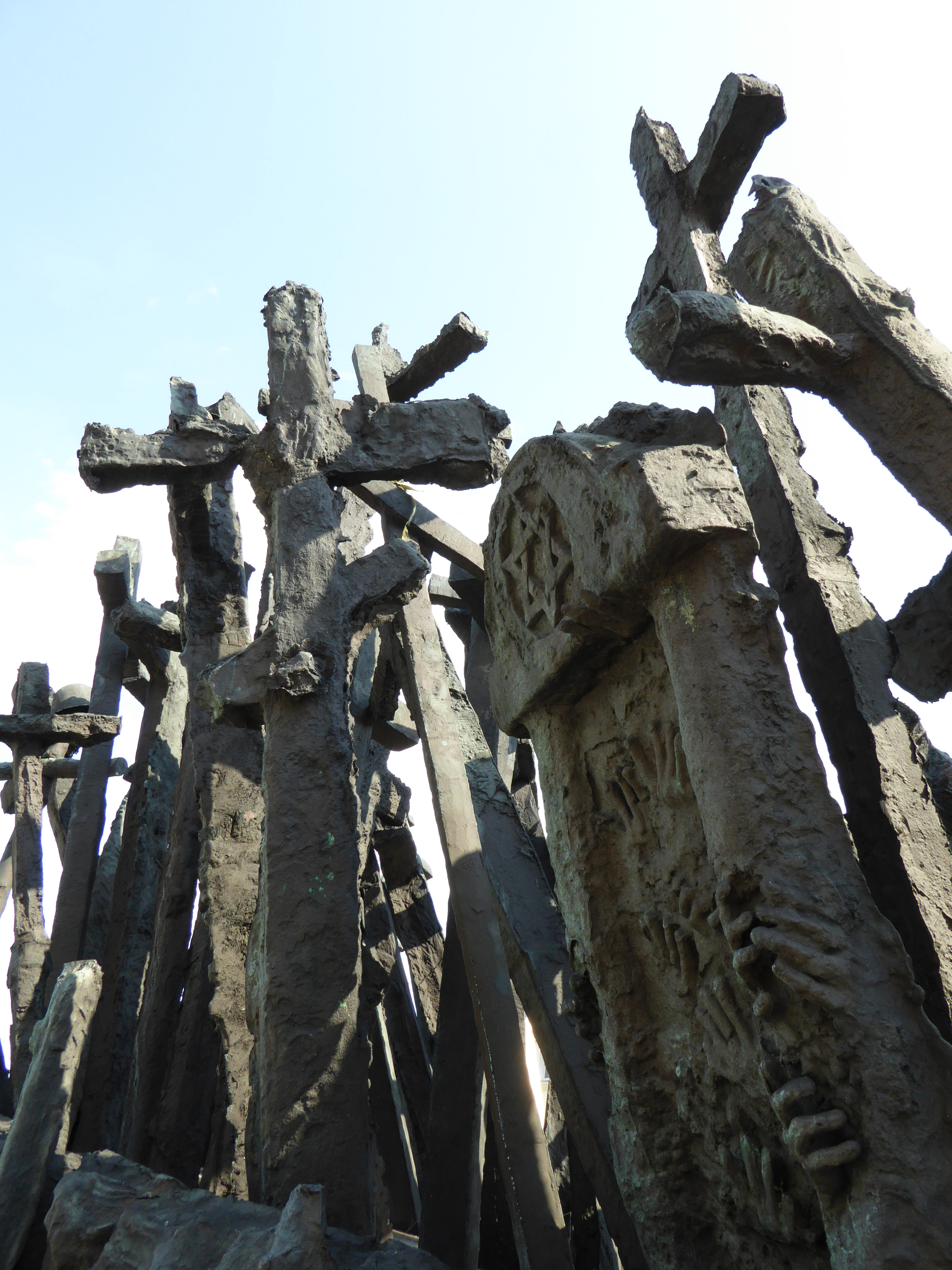
Religious symbols inside the railway flatcar

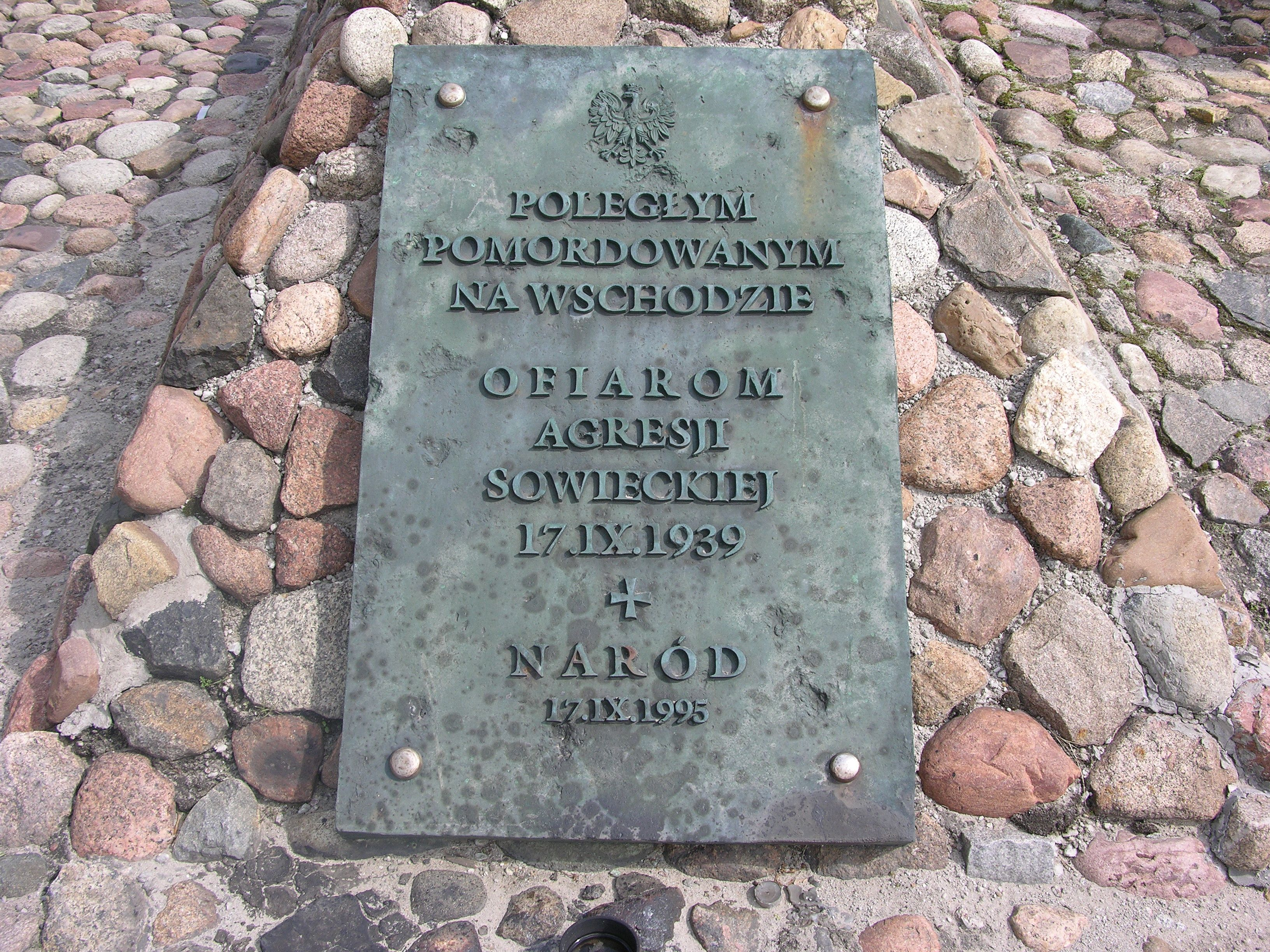
The inscriptions dedicated to the victims

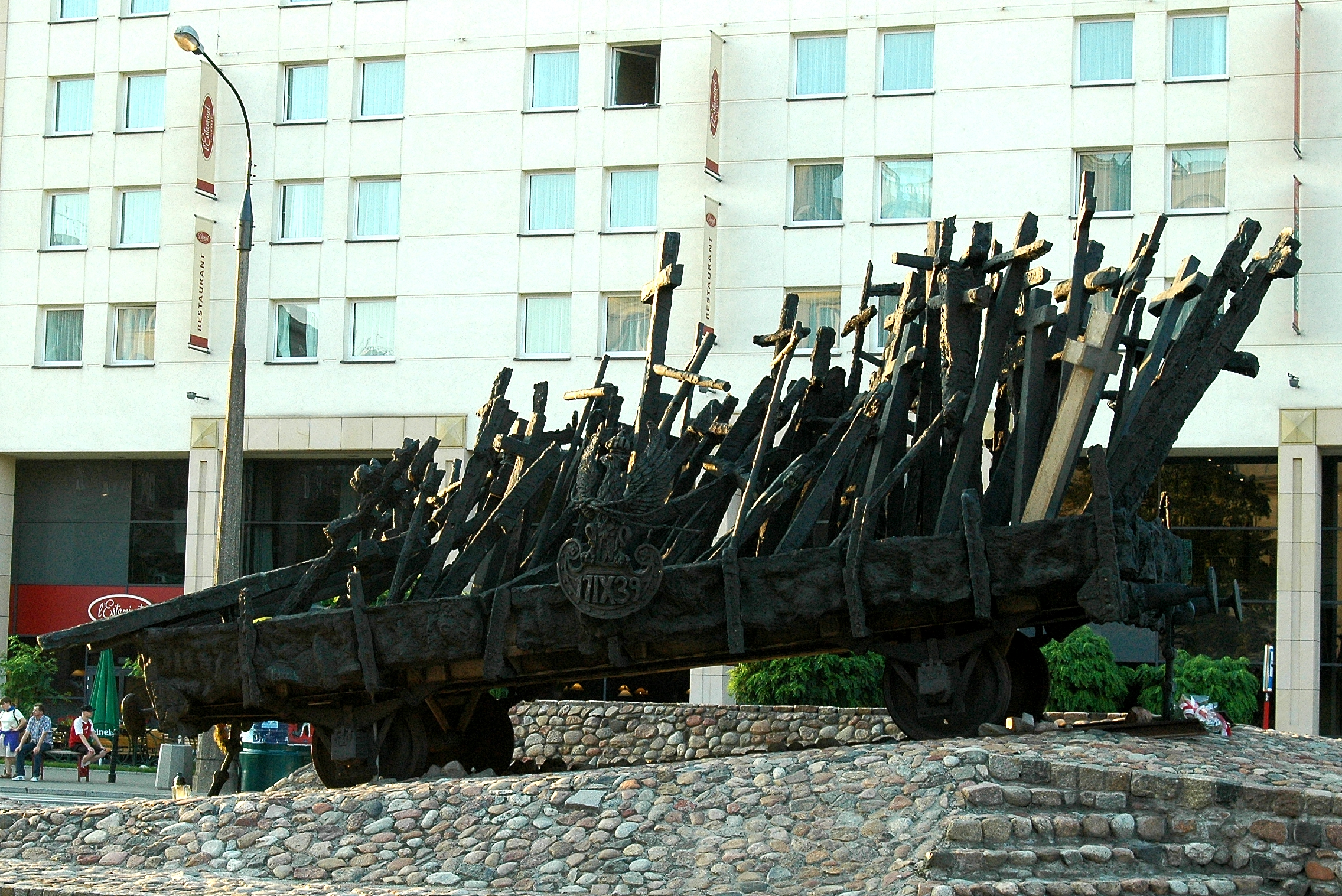
The railway flatcar viewed from the south

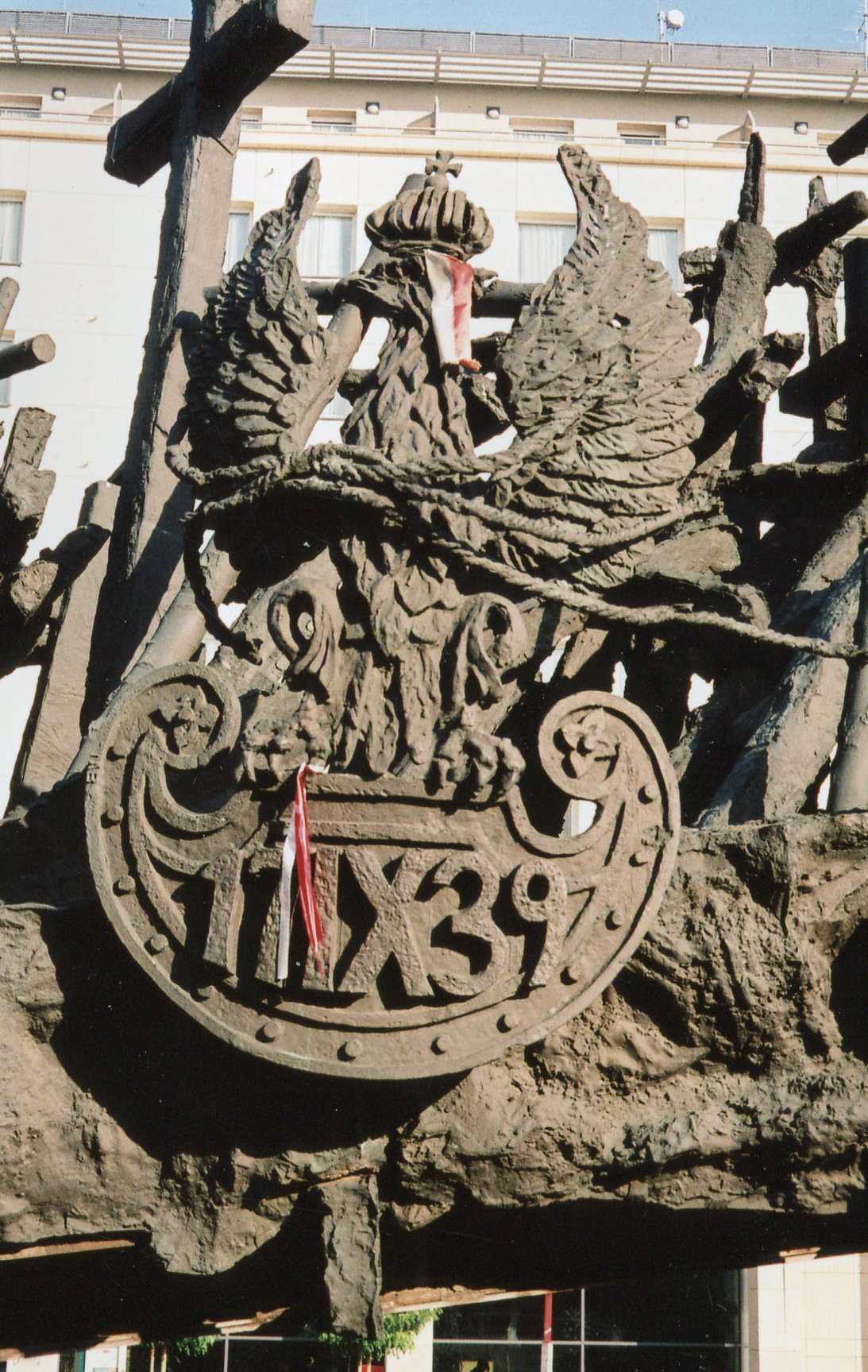
The Polish eagle on the southern side of the railway flatcar (with rope tied around it and the date of the Soviet invasion underneath)

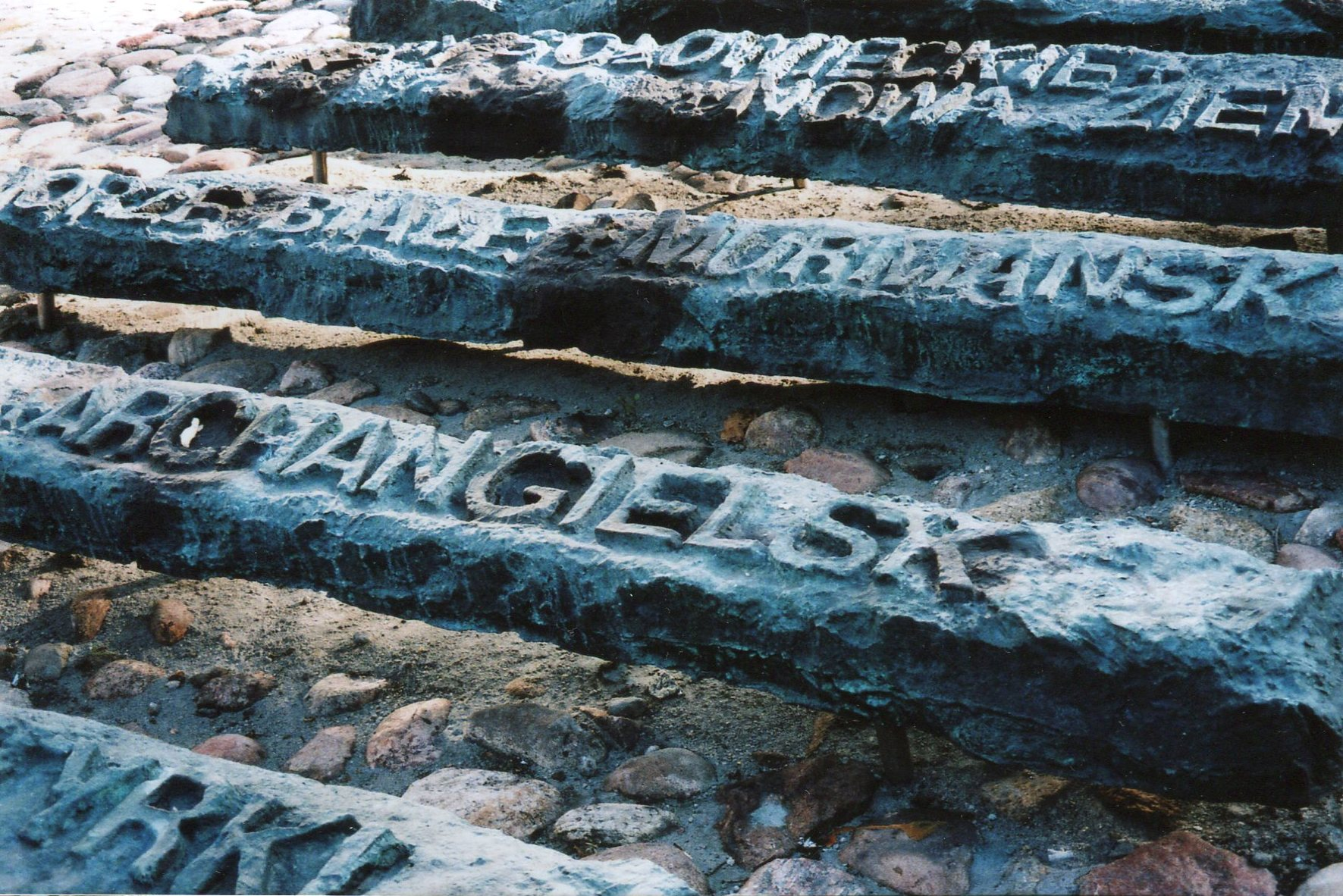
Close up of the railway sleepers showing the names of outposts of the Gulag like Archangielsk

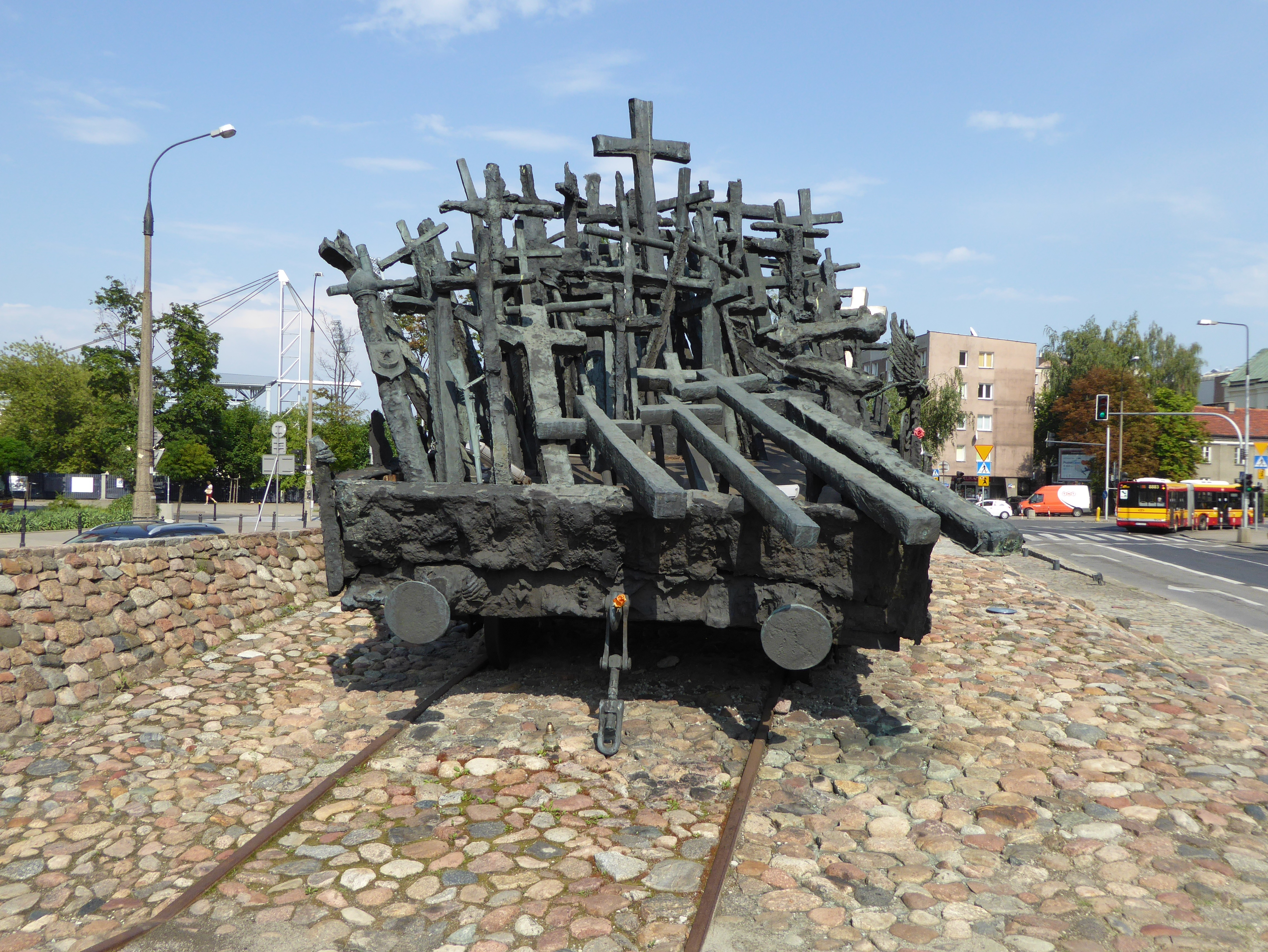
The railway flatcar

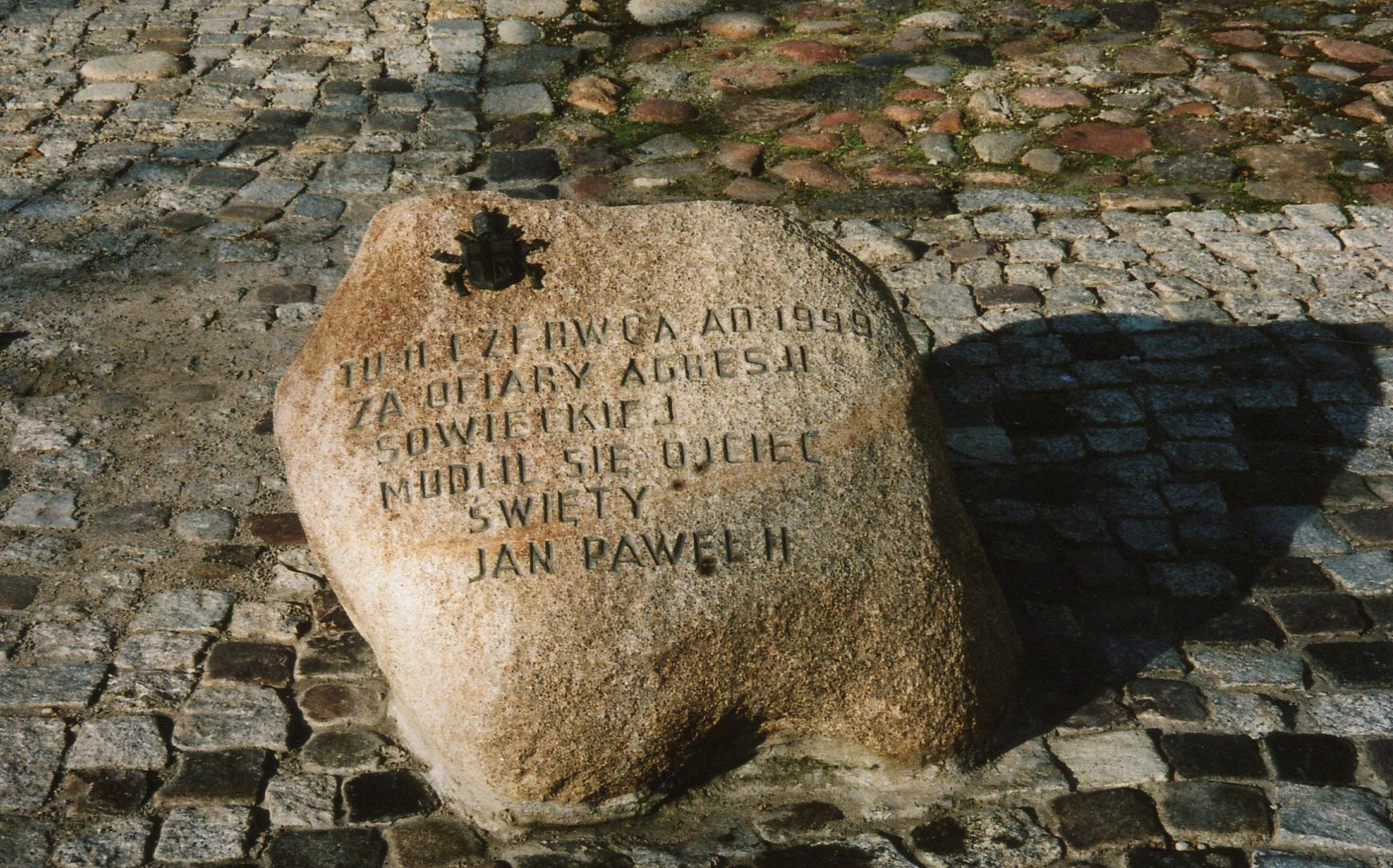
This stone was added to the monument after Pope John Paul II said a prayer for the victims of Soviet aggression at the site in 1999

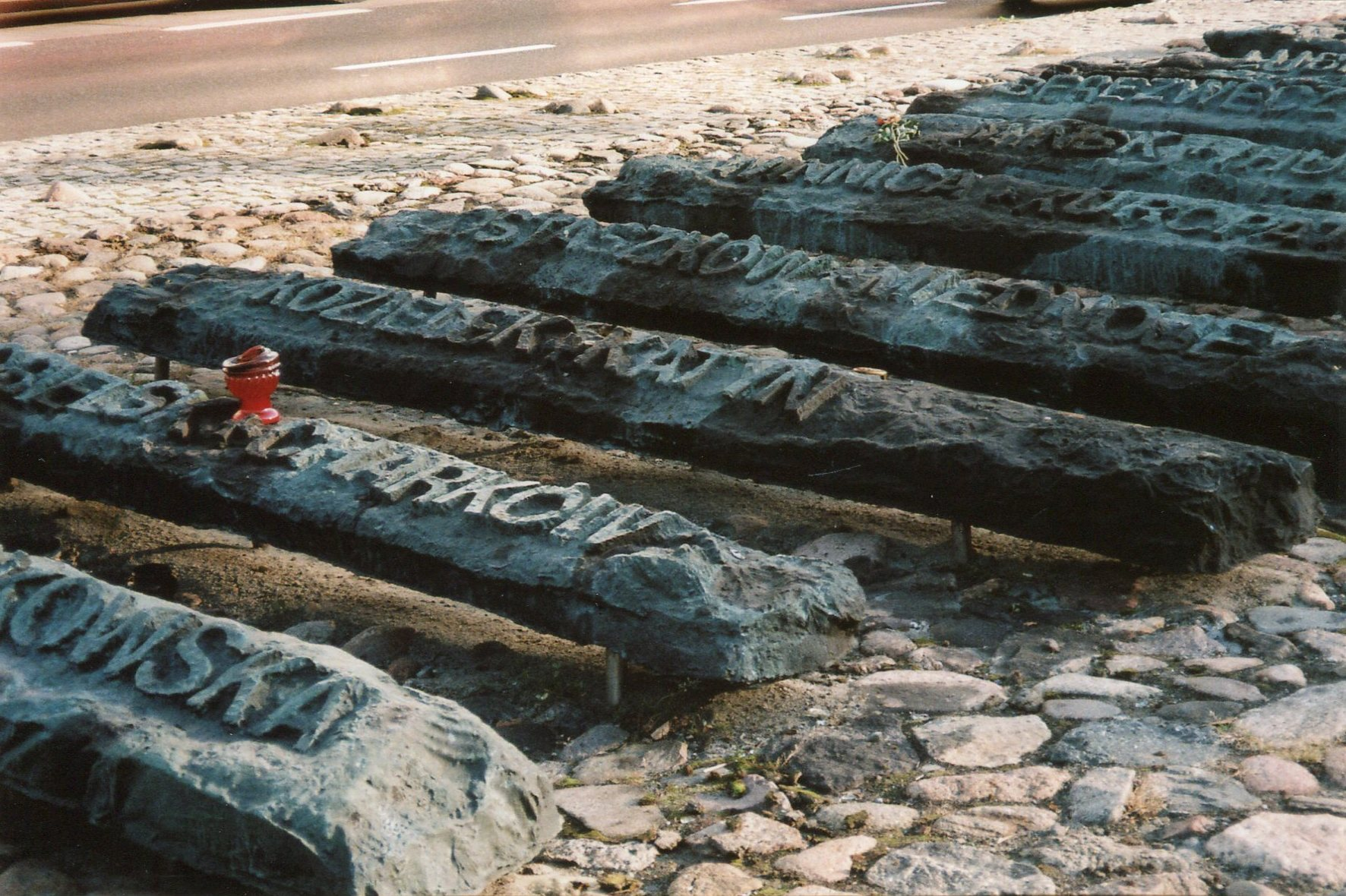
Close up of the railway sleepers showing the names of NKVD mass murder sites like Katyn

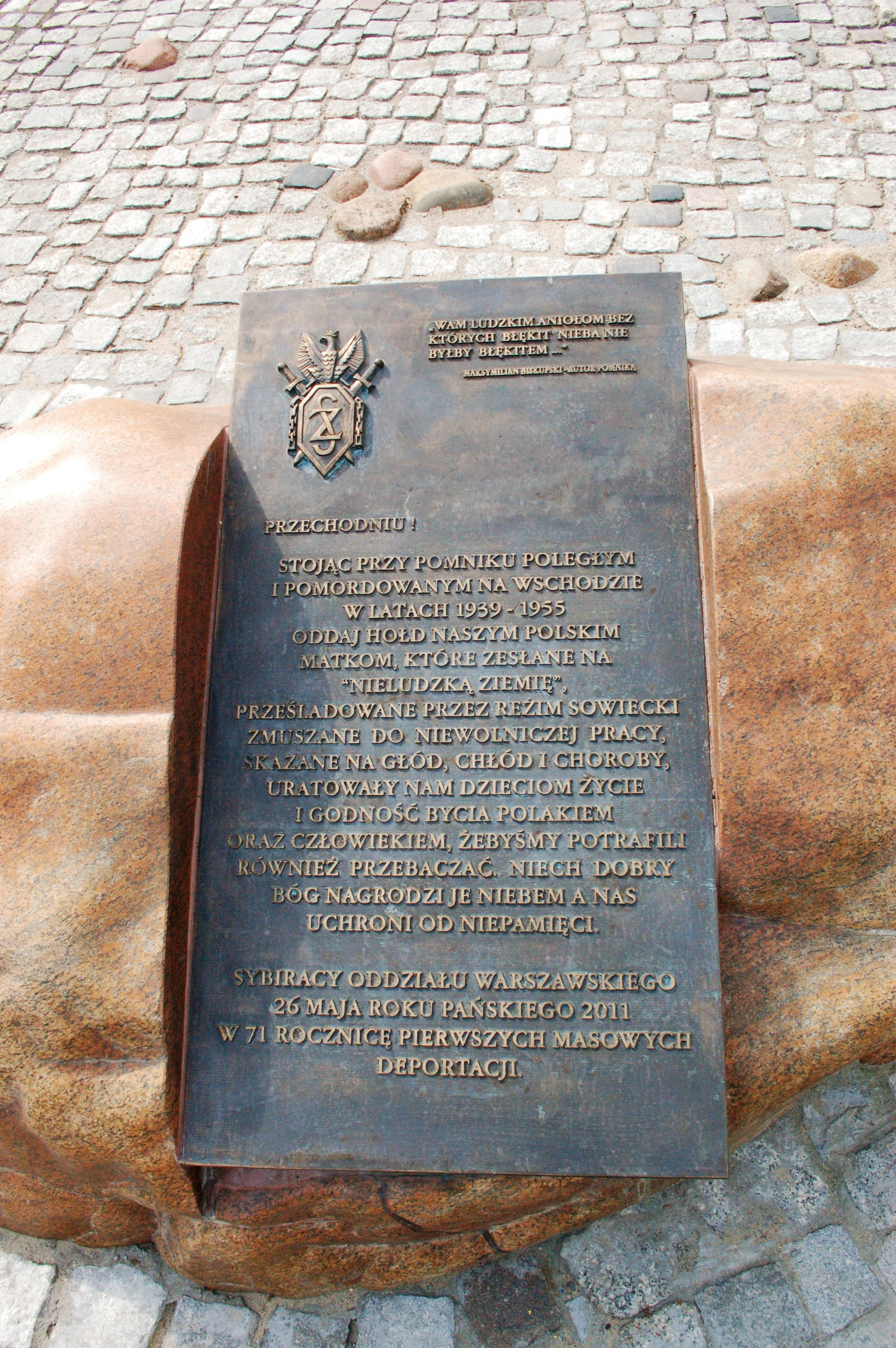
A memorial plaque dedicated to the deported mothers

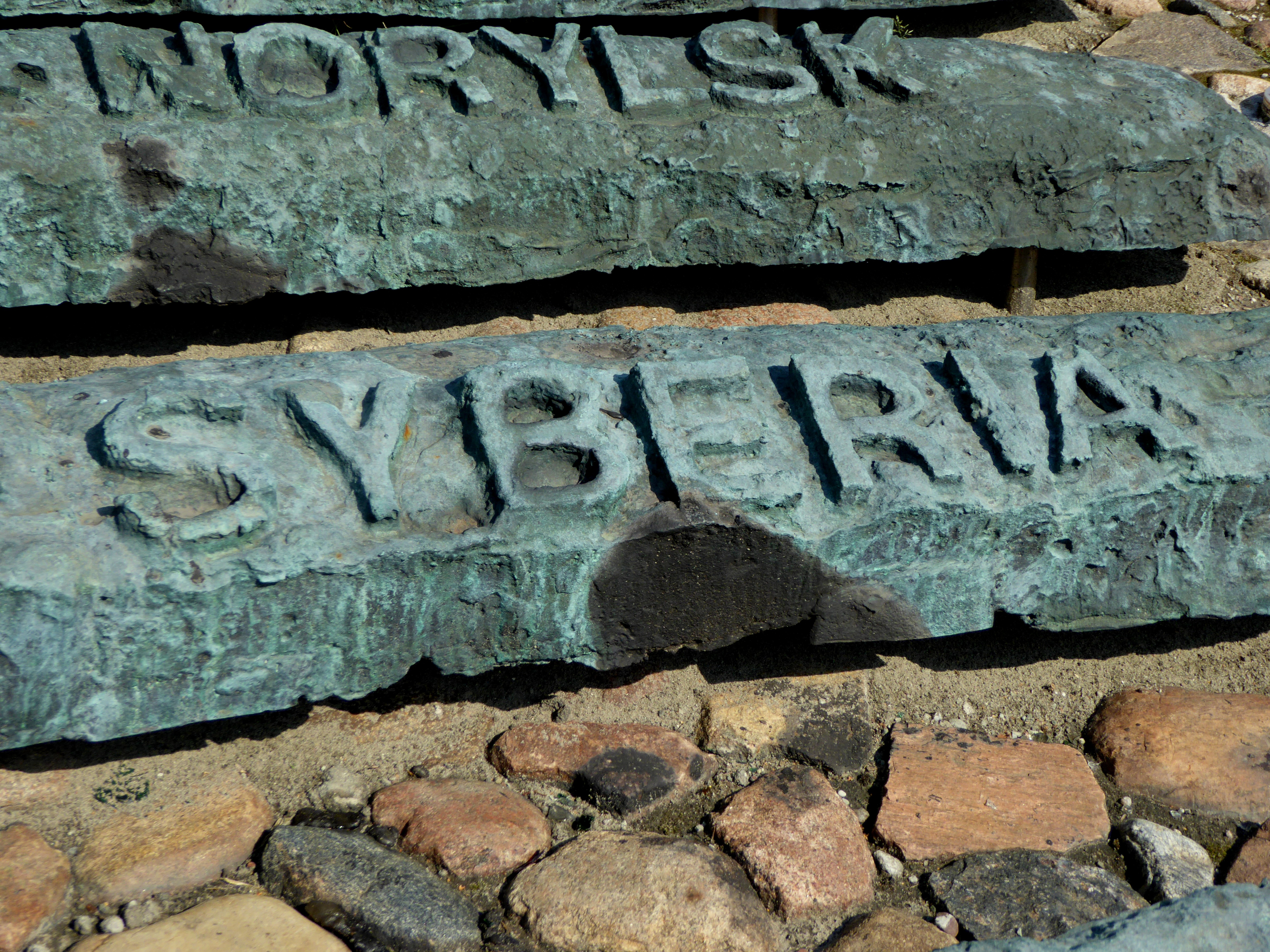
Close up of the railway sleepers - many of the victims of Soviet deportation were sent to Siberia
