= Petras Kunca =

Lithuanian musician

Petras Kunca (born 1942) is a Lithuanian violinist, awarded the National Prize of Lithuania (1979) and the Order of the Lithuanian Grand Duke Gediminas. For 31 years he performed with the Vilnius Quartet.

In 1965 Kunca graduated from the Lithuanian Academy of Music and Theatre and continued his studies at the Moscow Conservatory. He took further courses on violin and chamber music in Hungary (1968), Finland (1988), Spain (1992), Sweden (1998), Denmark (1999), Austria (2001).

Between 1964 and 1974, Kunca taught at the National M. K. Čiurlionis School of Art and then became a lecturer at the Lithuanian Academy of Music and Theatre. Since 1996 he is Head of Chamber Music Department. More than 200 chamber music students have graduated from Prof. Petras Kunca class.
