= Lithuanian Academy of Music and Theatre =

Public university in Vilnius, Lithuania

Coordinates: 54°41′19″N 25°16′11″E

- Lietuvos muzikos ir teatro akademija
- Type: public
- Established: 1933; 93 years ago
- Affiliations: European Association of Conservatoires, Association of Nordic Academies of Music, European Chamber Music Academy, CILECT
- Rector: Judita Žukienė
- Students: ~1000
- Location: Vilnius, Lithuania
- Campus: urban
- Website: lmta.lt
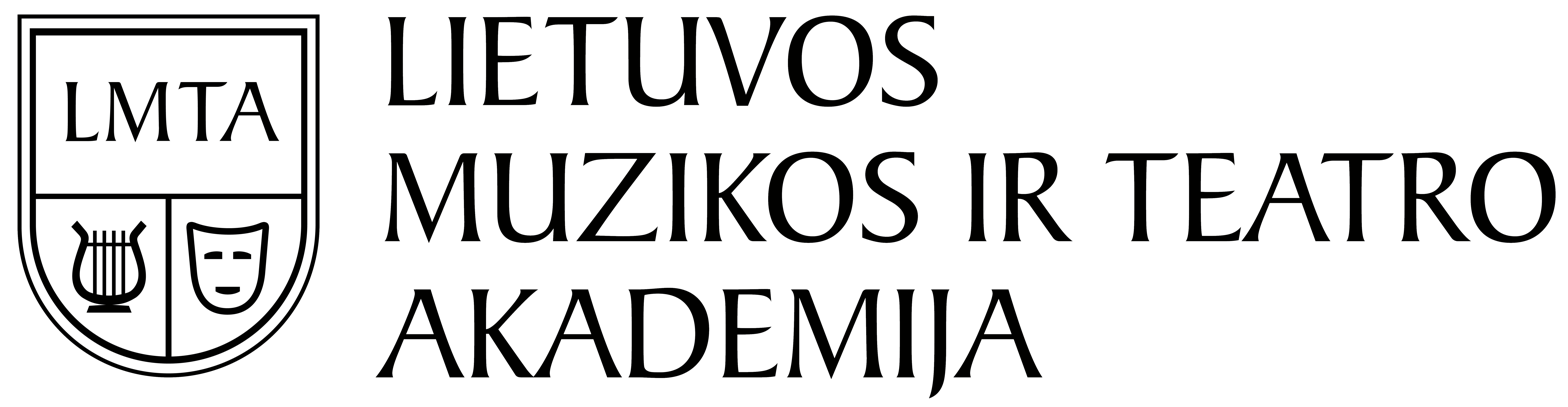

The Lithuanian Academy of Music and Theatre in Vilnius, Lithuania, is a state-supported conservatory that trains students in music, theatre, and multimedia arts.

== History ==
Composer Juozas Naujalis founded a music school in 1919 in Kaunas. This school was reorganised into the Kaunas Conservatory in 1933. In 1949 the Kaunas Conservatory and the Vilnius Conservatory, founded in 1945, were merged into the Lithuanian State Conservatory. The State Conservatory was renamed the Music Academy of Lithuania (LMA) in 1992, and in 2004 it became the Lithuanian Academy of Music and Theatre (LMTA). On 31 August 2021, the construction of a campus in Olandų Street (Antakalnis) began.

== Current operations ==
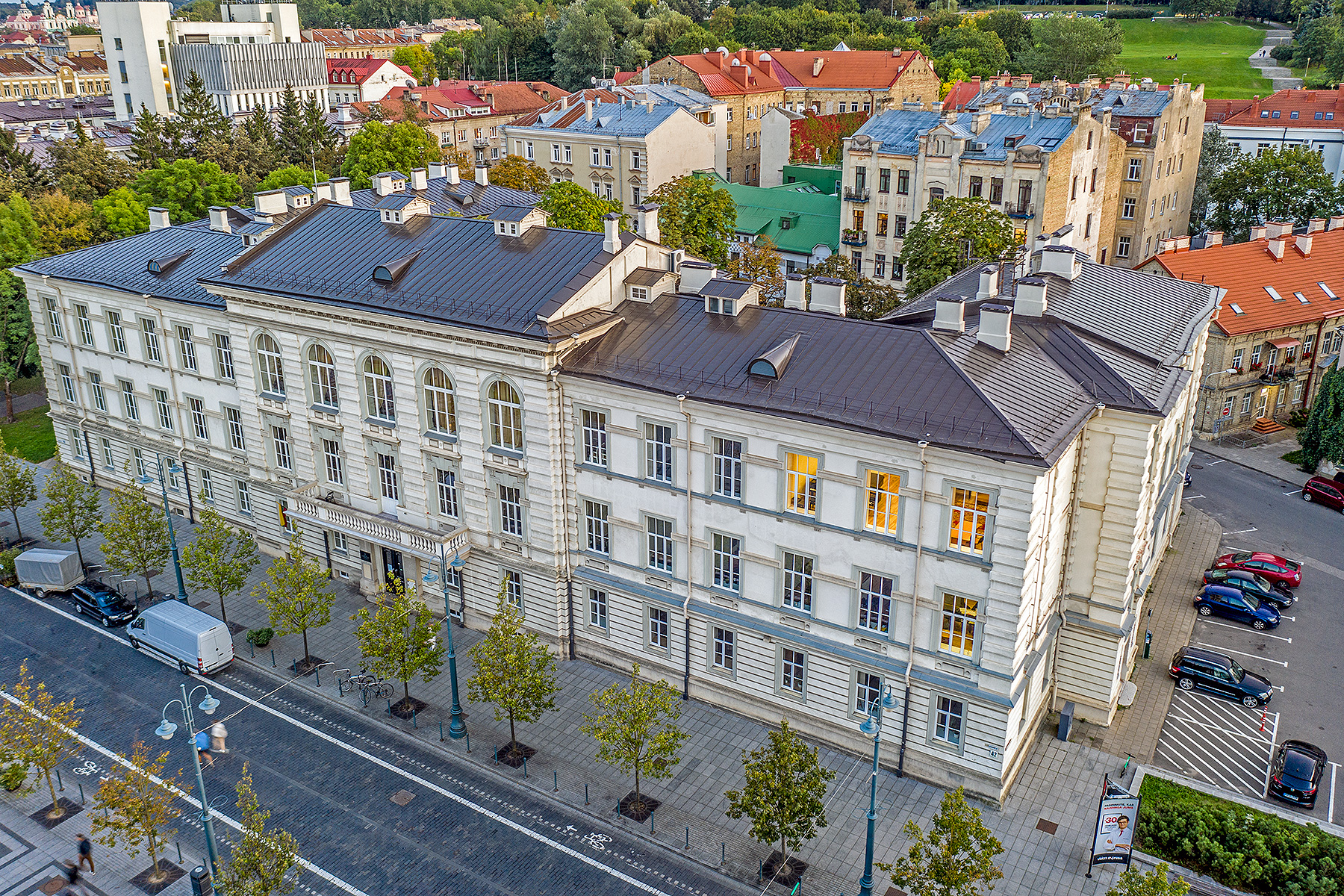
The main building of the Academy in the Gediminas Avenue

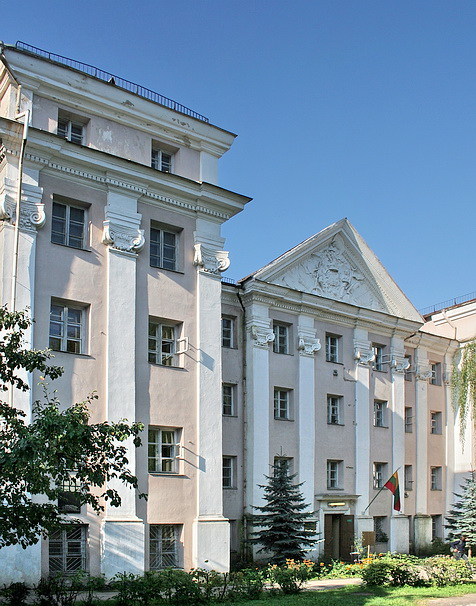
Slushko Palace in Vilnius houses a department of the Academy

As of January 2005 there were 1,167 students at the Academy, taught by a staff of 274. Its rector in 2011 was Professor Zbignevas Ibelgauptas. The Academy's headquarters are located on Gediminas Avenue.

The Academy awards the following degrees: Bachelor of Arts in Music, BA in Theatre, BA in Multimedia Arts, Master of Arts in Music, MA in Theatre, MA in Multimedia Arts, Ph.D. in Humanities for students of musicology, ethnomusicology, theatre theory and history, and a 2-year postgraduate Art Licentiate degree for music performers, composers and directors.

The Academy strives to "develop international cooperation and integration into the European and global academic community, to support and facilitate student and teacher exchange, and to ensure high-quality standards in higher education in the arts."

Its students and professors perform in over 400 concerts per year, participating in national and international orchestras, international concerts, performances, competitions, and festivals. Competitions and international events sponsored by the Academy include the International Jascha Heifetz Violin Competition, and an international competition for singers and pianists-accompanists, among others. It co-sponsors the International M. K. Čiurlionis Piano and Organ Competition and hosts national auditions for participation in the European Union Youth Orchestra, the International Choir and Orchestra Academy in Stuttgart, the International Holland Music Sessions, and numerous other scholarship auditions.

== International partnerships ==
The LMTA has bilateral agreements with 72 partner institutions across Europe in the Socrates programme. In 2003 it established a credit system comparable to the ECTS, the European Credit Transfer and Accumulation System.

Other bilateral or multilateral agreements have been signed with the Belarusian State Academy of Music, Moscow's Tchaikovsky Conservatory and its Slavic Traditional Music School, the Rimsky-Korsakov Saint Petersburg State Conservatory, and the University of Kansas.

The true face of the Academy is the artistic activity by both students and professors including over 400 concerts per year; students’ participation in national and international orchestras, international concerts, performances, competitions, and festivals; competitions and international events organised by the Academy – The International Jascha Heifetz Violin Competition, The International Competition for Singers and Pianists-Accompanists, The International Competition of Piano Duos, International Accordion and Folk Music Festivals, International Conferences for Ethnomusicologists, and a number of master-classes; events organised in cooperation with the Academy - The International M. K. Čiurlionis Piano and Organ Competition, national auditions for participation in the European Union Youth Orchestra, International Choir and Orchestra Academy (International Bachakademie Stuttgart), Gustav Mahler Youth Orchestra, International Holland Music Sessions, YAMAHA scholarship, Stasys Baras scholarship for singers, Linda Maxey scholarship for percussion students, participation in the Villecroze Academy, and many other important international artistic activities.

== Notable faculty ==
- Jurgis Karnavičius (1912), pianist and the long-time rector of the Academy
- Petras Kunca, head of chamber music
- Elena Stanekaite-Laumyanskene, professor
- Jonas Vaitkus, lecturer in acting, 1988
- Petras Vyšniauskas, professor
- Aleksandra Žvirblytė, associate professor
