= Petras Giniotas =

Lithuanian politician (born 1952)

Petras Giniotas (born 2 December 1952) is a Lithuanian politician. In 1990, he was among those who signed the Act of the Re-Establishment of the State of Lithuania.

== See also ==
- Politics of Lithuania
