= Petras Poškus =

Lithuanian politician

Petras Poškus (15 December 1935 – 5 January 2004) was a Lithuanian politician. In 1990 he was among those who signed the Act of the Re-Establishment of the State of Lithuania.
