= Petráš =

Petráš (feminine Petrášová) is a Slovak family name. Notable people with the name include:

- Ján Petráš (born 1986), Slovak football midfielder
- Ladislav Petráš (born 1946), Slovak football player
- Martin Petráš (born 1979), Slovak football central defender
- Peter Petráš (born 1979), Slovak football defender
- Samuel Petráš (footballer) (born 1999), Slovak footballer
- Samuel Petráš (ice hockey) (born 1995), Slovak ice hockey player
