= NKVD prisoner massacre in Berezhany =

1941 Soviet war crime

- Part of occupation of Poland (1939–1945)
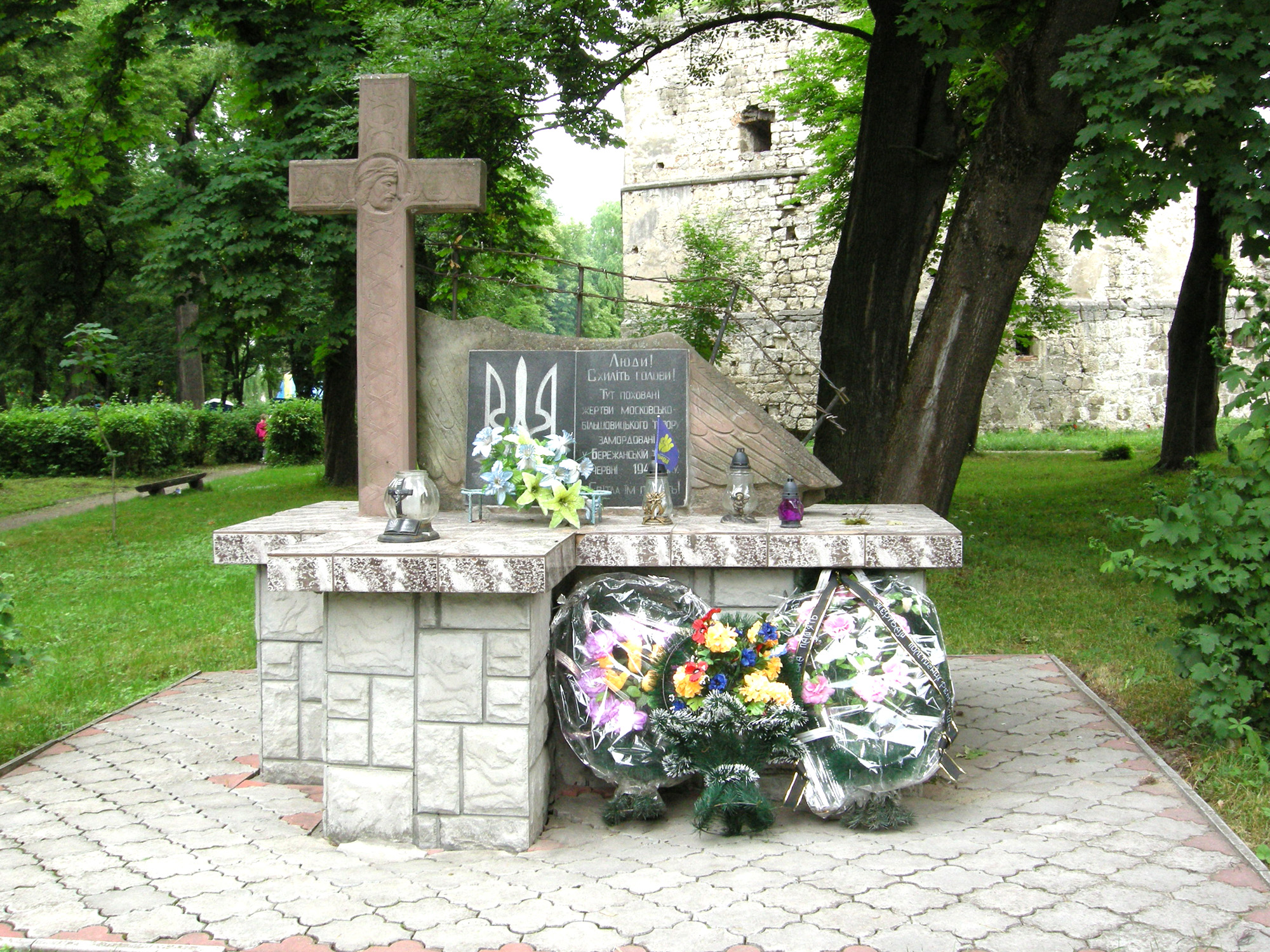
- Mass grave of the victims
- Location: 49°26′28″N 24°56′35″E; Berezhany, Eastern Poland/Western Ukraine
- Date: June 26–30, 1941
- Target: Prisoners, mostly Ukrainians and Poles
- Attack type: mass murder
- Deaths: 174–300
- Perpetrator: NKVD

The NKVD prisoner massacre in Berezhany was a Soviet war crime conducted by the NKVD in the city of Berezhany, then in occupied Poland and now in Ukraine. Between 26 and 30 June 1941, following the German invasion of the USSR, the Soviets executed at least 174 prisoners held in the Berezhany prison. This atrocity was one of several prisoner massacres carried out by the Soviet secret police and army during the summer of 1941.

== Background ==
During the interwar period, Berezhany (Ukrainian: Бережани, Polish: Brzeżany) was located within the borders of the Second Polish Republic and served as the center of the Berezhany county in Tarnopol Voivodeship. After the German-Soviet invasion of Poland in 1939, the city fell under Soviet occupation.

Those apprehended by the NKVD were confined in the cells of a pre-war Polish municipal prison. The prison in Berezhany was one of four Soviet prisons operating in Ternopil Oblast. It was referred to as 'Prison No. 3' in Soviet official documents. An NKVD functionary named Krasan served as a prison warden.

On June 22, 1941, Nazi Germany invaded the Soviet Union. Due to the swift progress of the German offensive, the NKVD began exterminating political prisoners in the war zone. In the summer of 1941, in the part of Poland occupied by the USSR, an estimated 20,000 to 30,000 individuals were murdered in prisons and detention centers.

== Massacre ==
According to documents from Soviet archives, as of June 10, 1941, the prison in Berezhany held 351 inmates. A July 12, 1941 report by Captain of State Security Andrei Filippov, regarding the evacuation of prisons in the western districts of the Ukrainian SSR, informs that, as of June 28, 1941, 376 prisoners were held in Berezhany. This information is also found in the "List of departures and movements of transports from NKVD prisons of the Ukrainian SSR".

After the outbreak of the German-Soviet war, militants of the Organization of Ukrainian Nationalists (OUN) made an unsuccessful attempt to capture the prison. Andrei Filippov's report stated that "starting on June 22, the prison was shelled more than once by OUN gangs."

Jerzy Węgierski, citing the account of a witness of these events, stated that the mass executions began on June 26, 1941, and continued until approximately June 30. The victims were taken one by one from their cells to the courtyard, where they were shot. Some prisoners were likely murdered in the basement, as their bodies were later found there. During the execution, the tractor engine was started to drown out the sounds of shots and the screams of the victims. German soldiers who latter visited the site of the massacre claimed that some of the prisoners had been tortured to death. Ukrainian witnesses also claimed that the prisoners' corpses showed signs of torture. (Note: The testimony and accounts of witnesses involved in the exhumation of the victims of the NKVD prisoner massacres repeatedly mention bodies bearing signs of severe torture. However, according to Bogdan Musiał, injuries initially thought to be signs of torture were likely a result of rapid decomposition of the corpses, accelerated by the summer heat, as well as scavengers and unskilled handling during exhumation (see: Musiał (2001), pp. 236–237). At times, executions were hastily carried out using grenades and machine guns, resulting in severe injuries to the victims (see: Musiał (2001), p. 236). Also, he believes that in Eastern Galicia and Volhynia, there were cases where, after the departure of the Soviets, the bodies of NKVD victims were purposely mutilated by Ukrainian nationalists seeking to depict dramatic examples of their nation's martyrdom for propaganda purposes (see: Musiał (2001), pp. 237–240).)

NKVD men tried to cover up the traces of the crime. The witness cited by Węgierski reported that initially the bodies of the victims were taken outside the prison and buried in previously dug pits. However, after June 29, the bodies were thrown from the bridge into the Zolota Lypa River (this is confirmed also by German reports). According to Zbigniew Rusiński, the bodies of 150 victims were found in the prison, and about 70 bodies in the graves near the Berezhany Castle. According to German sources, several mutilated bodies were also found in the basement of one of the houses in the city.

Andrei Filippow, in turn, informed in his report that most of the bodies were buried in the Berezhany Castle ("in the old fortress"). Another 40 bodies were to be transported from the prison by cars, but as a result of a Luftwaffe air raid, they were abandoned along with the vehicles on the road. Filippov claimed that the prison warden and his men later tried to bury the bodies left behind, but due to another raid, they only had time to throw them from the cars. (Note: The same report also mentioned that “20 bodies remained in the basement of the prison, which were not transported in time because the head of the regional department of the NKGB, Maksimov, categorically refused to provide cars for the removal of bodies.” See: Musiał (2001), p. 135 and Popiński, Kokurin, Gurjanow (1995), p. 102.)

The massacre was interrupted only by the escape of the guards, caused by a German air raid. According to the cited by Węgierski, about 80 prisoners survived that way. In turn, according to NKVD reports, 107 prisoners escaped from prison. (Note: According to Andrei Filippov's report, this includes 8 prisoners convicted of less serious common crimes who were released, as well as '48 prisoners included in the register of the NKGB regional department and 51 people subject to release by the prosecutor's decision' who remained in the prison cells. See: Popiński, Kokurin, Gurjanow (1995), p. 102.) They also inform that 94 inmates were evacuated to the prison in Ternopil. Ultimately, 65 prisoners from Brzeżany were to reach Verkhneuralsk.

Sources provide divergent information about the number of people murdered. According to the NKVD reports, 174 prisoners "decreased according to the first category," indicating they were executed. Polish sources, however, estimate that the number of victims ranges from over 200 to over 300 people.

== Aftermath ==
The prison massacre was not the sole crime committed by the Soviets in Berezhany in the summer of 1941. An undetermined number of inhabitants became victims of the Red Army soldiers retreating to the east. The soldiers threw grenades into basements where civilians were hiding, and for unclear reasons, they also took hostages from among the local population – including women and children – whom they later murdered on the Berezhany–Shybalyn road.

As in other instances of prison massacres, the local Jewish community got blamed for the actions of the NKVD. As per the antisemitic canard of Jewish Bolshevism, non-Jewish inhabitants perceived Jews as synonymous with the Soviet regime and its policies of terror. After the Germans took control of Berezhany, which happened on July 4, 1941, dozens of local Jews were forced to work on the exhumation and burial of the corpses of murdered prisoners. Upon completing their work, the workers were killed by Ukrainian militiamen (using shovels). The pogrom soon spread throughout the entire city. Ukrainian militiamen and civilians beat and murdered Jews and plundered their houses and shops.

== Bibliography ==
- Dean, Martin C.; Hecker, Mel (2012). Encyclopedia of Camps and Ghettos, 1933–1945. Vol. II: Ghettos in German-Occupied Eastern Europe. Bloomington, Indianapolis: United States Holocaust Memorial Museum, Indiana University Press. ISBN 978-0-253-00202-0.
- Głowacki, Albin (1997). "Organizacja i funkcjonowanie więziennictwa NKWD na Kresach Wschodnich II Rzeczypospolitej w latach 1939–1941" [Organization and functioning of the NKVD prison system in the Eastern Borderlands of the Second Polish Republic in 1939–1941]. In Mikoda, Janina (ed.). Zbrodnicza ewakuacja więzień i aresztów NKWD na Kresach Wschodnich II Rzeczypospolitej w czerwcu – lipcu 1941 roku. Materiały z sesji naukowej w 55. rocznicę ewakuacji więźniów NKWD w głąb ZSRR, Łódź 10 czerwca 1996 r. [Criminal evacuation of NKVD prisons and detention centers in the Eastern Borderlands of the Second Polish Republic in June–July 1941. Materials from the scientific session on the 55th anniversary of the evacuation of NKVD prisoners deep into the USSR, Łódź, June 10, 1996] (in Polish). Warszawa: Główna Komisja Badania Zbrodni przeciwko Narodowi Polskiemu – Instytut Pamięci Narodowej. ISBN 83-903356-6-2.
- Motyka, Grzegorz (2006). Ukraińska partyzantka 1942–1960. Działalność Organizacji Ukraińskich Nacjonalistów i Ukraińskiej Powstańczej Armii [Ukrainian guerilla 1942–1960. Activities of the Organization of Ukrainian Nationalists and the Ukrainian Insurgent Army] (in Polish). Warszawa: Instytut Studiów Politycznych PAN i Oficyna Wydawnicza RYTM. ISBN 83-88490-58-3.
- Musiał, Bogdan (2001). Rozstrzelać elementy kontrrewolucyjne. Brutalizacja wojny niemiecko-sowieckiej latem 1941 roku [Shoot the counter-revolutionary elements. The brutalization of the German-Soviet war in the summer of 1941] (in Polish). Warszawa: Stowarzyszenie Kulturalne Fronda. ISBN 83-88747-40-1.
- Popiński, Krzysztof (1997). "Ewakuacja więzień kresowych w czerwcu 1941 r. na podstawie dokumentacji "Memoriału" i Archiwum Wschodniego" [Evacuation of Eastern Borderlands’ prisons in June 1941 in the light of documents gathered by the "Memorial" and the Eastern Archive]. In Mikoda, Janina (ed.). Zbrodnicza ewakuacja więzień i aresztów NKWD na Kresach Wschodnich II Rzeczypospolitej w czerwcu – lipcu 1941 roku. Materiały z sesji naukowej w 55. rocznicę ewakuacji więźniów NKWD w głąb ZSRR, Łódź 10 czerwca 1996 r. [Criminal evacuation of NKVD prisons and detention centers in the Eastern Borderlands of the Second Polish Republic in June–July 1941. Materials from the scientific session on the 55th anniversary of the evacuation of NKVD prisoners deep into the USSR, Łódź, June 10, 1996] (in Polish). Warszawa: Główna Komisja Badania Zbrodni przeciwko Narodowi Polskiemu – Instytut Pamięci Narodowej. ISBN 83-903356-6-2.
- Popiński, Krzysztof; Kokurin, Aleksandr; Gurjanow, Aleksandr (1995). Drogi śmierci. Ewakuacja więzień sowieckich z Kresów Wschodnich II Rzeczypospolitej w czerwcu i lipcu 1941 [Roads of death. Evacuation of Soviet prisons from the Eastern Borderlands of the Second Polish Republic in June and July 1941] (in Polish). Warszawa: Wydawnictwo "Karta". ISBN 83-900676-9-2.
- Redlich, Shimon (2008). Razem i osobno. Polacy, Żydzi, Ukraińcy w Brzeżanach 1919–1945 [Together and Apart in Brzezany: Poles, Jews, and Ukrainians, 1919–1945] (in Polish). Sejny: Fundacja Pogranicze. ISBN 978-83-86872-99-2.
- Węgierski, Jerzy (1991). Lwów pod okupacją sowiecką 1939–1941 [Lviv under Soviet occupation 1939–1941] (in Polish). Warszawa: Editions Spotkania. ISBN 83-85195-15-7.
