= NKVD prisoner massacre in Sambir =

1941 Soviet execution of prisoners

- Part of occupation of Poland (1939–1945)
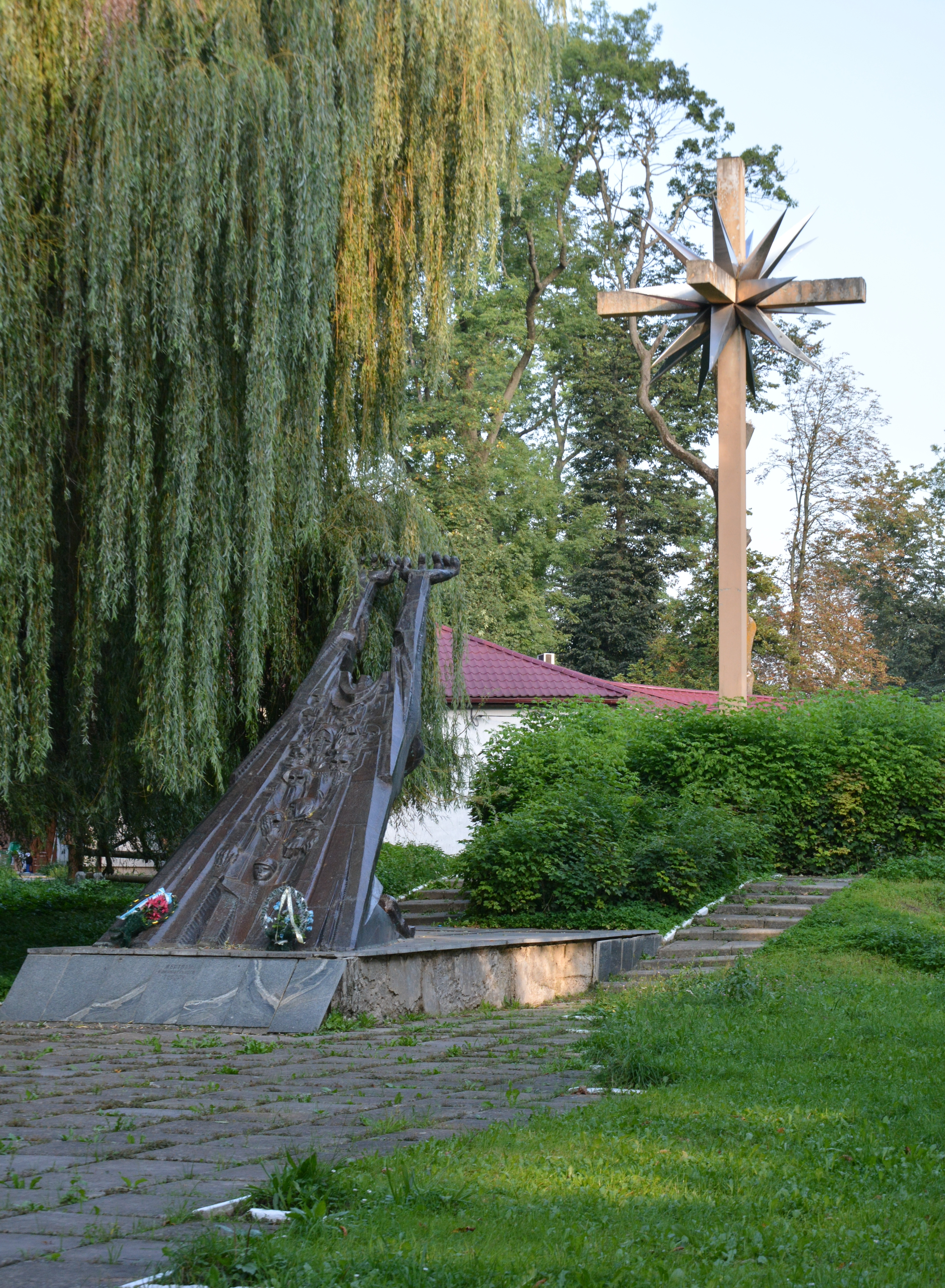
- Mass grave of the victims
- Location: 49°31′06″N 23°11′48″E; Sambir, Eastern Poland/Western Ukraine
- Date: June 22–27, 1941
- Target: Prisoners, mostly Ukrainians and Poles
- Attack type: mass murder
- Deaths: around 600
- Perpetrator: NKVD

The NKVD prisoner massacre in Sambir was a Soviet war crime conducted by the NKVD in the city of Sambir, then located in occupied Poland (now in Ukraine). In the last days of June 1941, following the German invasion of the USSR, the Soviets executed an estimated 500 to 700 prisoners held in the Sambir prison. The majority of those executed were Ukrainians and Poles. During the latter stage of the massacre, some prisoners actively resisted, which resulted in saving their lives. This atrocity was one of several prisoner massacres carried out by the Soviet secret police and army during the summer of 1941.

== Background ==
During the interwar period, Sambir (Ukrainian: Самбір, Polish: Sambor) was located within the borders of the Second Polish Republic and served as the center of the Sambir county in Lwów Voivodeship. After the German-Soviet invasion of Poland in 1939, the city fell under Soviet occupation.

The NKVD detained individuals were held in the cells of the local prison situated on Drohobycka Street, in very close proximity to the pre-war district court building. The prison in Sambir was one of four Soviet prisons operating in the Drohobych Oblast. It was referred to as 'Prison No. 3' in Soviet official documents. Milchenko, an NKVD official, served as the prison warden. Near the prison also stood a building that had previously housed the pre-war county office, repurposed to accommodate the local NKVD post after the occupation began.

On June 22, 1941, Nazi Germany initiated an invasion of the Soviet Union. Owing to the swift progression of the German offensive, the NKVD began the process of exterminating political prisoners held within the war zone. In the summer of 1941, within the part of Poland occupied by the USSR, an estimated 20,000 to 30,000 individuals in prisons and detention centers were murdered.

== The massacre ==
=== The course of events ===
According to documents from Soviet archives, as of June 10, 1941, the prison in Sambir held 1310 inmates. However, it is difficult to determine exactly how many prisoners were in their cells when the massacre commenced. Bogdan Musiał estimated that around 600–700 people were confined in the cells of Sambir prison when the German-Soviet war began. On the other hand, the reports prepared by the NKVD after the liquidation of the prisons in the western regions of the Ukrainian SSR provide only summary information about the fate of inmates from prisons in Sambir and Stryi. Their content shows that on June 22, 1941, a total of 2,242 people were detained in both prisons. However, after the German invasion began, the NKVD began mass arrests of alleged 'enemies of the people.' These individuals were not registered in the prison records.

The massacre probably began on the first day of the German–Soviet war. Initially, the Soviets tried to give the executions an appearance of lawfulness. For this reason, the victims were called out of their cells in groups of 5–10 and then taken to one of the prison's buildings where the court-martial was held. After a quick "trial", the victims were taken to the prison basement and murdered there with a shot to the back of the head. The bodies were placed in layers in basement cells. Prisoners were continuously executed in this way for about 4–5 days. Some witnesses claimed that in that period of time about half of the inmates’ population was taken from their cells and murdered.

On June 25 or 26, the guards unexpectedly ordered the prisoners to pack their personal belongings and then took them out to the inner courtyard. It was probably a prelude to the planned evacuation deep into USSR. In the meantime, however, a local prosecutor named Stupakov arrived at the prison by car and, in harsh words, ordered prison warden Milchenko to continue "destroying the enemy". After Stupakov's departure, the prisoners were herded back into their cells and executions resumed.

On an unspecified day – probably June 26 or 27, although witnesses also gave later dates – the perpetrators decided to rapidly accelerate the liquidation of the prisoners. A group of about 50 people (Note: This information is provided by Bogdan Musiał. However, in other sources one can find information that several such groups of fifty people were led to execution at the inner courtyard. See: Criminal evacuation (1997), p. 129 and Węgierski (1991), p. 276.) was taken to the inner courtyard, and then the NKVDs stationed in the guard towers and in the windows on the first and second floors opened fire with machine guns and started throwing grenades at them. Most of the prisoners were killed. However, at least a few managed to dodge the bullets and escape back into the building. They alerted the other prisoners, who broke the cell doors and escaped into the corridors. Stefan Duda, one of the survivors, claimed that prisoners armed with boards, buckets and other metal objects attacked the guards in the prison building.

Due to the prisoners' determined resistance, the NKVD personnel hesitated to retake the building. They only resorted to shooting at its windows and targeting those attempting to escape. Meanwhile, Prosecutor Stupakov attempted to halt a passing Red Army artillery unit and ordered its commander to fire at the prison building. However, the officer refused and proceeded eastward with his soldiers. After hours of gunfire, the NKVD forces broke the siege and withdrew, likely fearing the advancing German troops. As a result, several hundred prisoners survived; German sources estimated their number at around four hundred. With the departure of their would-be executioners, the prisoners fled through an unlocked gate and sought refuge in the city. According to one of the Polish survivors, the retreating Red Army soldiers did not impede the escapees, although they had to avoid the NKVD border troops.

=== Victims ===
After the Soviet evacuation from Sambir, residents visited the prison on Drohobycka Street. The bodies of prisoners killed in the latter phase of the massacre were discovered in the inner yard. Additionally, six cells filled with corpses were found in the building's basement. In three rooms, the bodies were relatively fresh and stacked to the ceiling, while in the other bricked-up rooms, they were in an advanced state of decomposition. Some bodies might have been taken outside the city by the NKVD. (Note: In a June 28, 1941 report by Captain of State Security Andrei Filippov, head of the prison board of the NKVD of the Ukrainian SSR, regarding the course of the evacuation of prisons in the western regions of the Ukrainian SSR, there is information that 80 unburied bodies remained in the prison because the management of the local NKGB post refused the request of the prison warden to provide help with burying them. See: Popiński, Kokurin i Gurjanow (1995), p. 100.) In early August 1941, or shortly after the massacre (accounts vary), approximately 116-118 bodies were accidentally uncovered on the banks of the Dniester. A preliminary examination led to their reburial, and the remains were not exhumed until 1991. The identities of those in this grave, whether victims of the prison massacre or of NKVD killings in 1939–1941, remain undetermined.

The exact number of victims remains difficult to determine. The preserved NKVD reports only inform that in the prisons in Sambir and Stryi a total of 1,101 inmates "decreased according to the first category" (meaning were executed). (Note: These reports also indicate that from both prisons 637 people were evacuated east by rail, 250 people were released, while 304 people were left in their cells. See: Popiński, Kokurin i Gurjanow (1995), pp. 96, 100.) "List of departures and movements of transports from NKVD prisons of the Ukrainian SSR" also informs that on July 17, 1941, a transport with 210 prisoners from Sambir arrived in Zlatoust.

Eyewitnesses estimated the number of those murdered at approximately 616–720. Polish researcher Paweł Kostrzewa estimated that the number of victims was no less than 500 and no more than 700. According to findings by the District Commission for the Prosecution of Crimes against the Polish Nation in Łódź, the number of murdered people was around 600. The victims included prisoners of Ukrainian, Polish and Jewish nationality.

Witnesses to the exhumation carried out within the prison claimed that some of the bodies showed signs of severe torture. Among the accounts, there were allegations of atrocities, including the discovery of bodies of girl scouts that were reportedly subjected to brutal acts, including of rape and mutilation, like the cutting off of breasts. (Note: In the testimonies and accounts of witnesses involved in the exhumation of the victims of the NKVD prisoner massacres, there is repeated mention of discovered bodies bearing signs of severe torture. Some evidence suggests that certain NKVD members may have abused the victims before their murders. Moreover, it is a known fact that some victims were killed using bayonets and blunt instruments. However, according to Bogdan Musiał's perspective, the injuries initially thought to be signs of torture by witnesses were likely a result of the rapid decomposition of the corpses, particularly accelerated by the summer heat, as well as the activity of scavengers and the unskilled handling during exhumation. Additionally, executions were sometimes conducted hastily, such as using grenades and machine guns. Also, he believes that in Eastern Galicia and Volhynia, there were cases where, after the departure of the Soviets, the bodies of NKVD victims were purposely mutilated by Ukrainian nationalists seeking to depict dramatic examples of their nation's martyrdom for propaganda purposes. See: Musiał (2001), pp. 235–241.) Additionally, there were gruesome but highly unreliable rumors within the city suggesting that the Soviets fed prisoners the remains of their murdered fellow inmates.

== Aftermath ==
A few days following the Soviet evacuation from Sambir, a ceremonial funeral was held for the victims of the massacre. Identified victims were taken by their families, while the remaining bodies were laid to rest in a mass grave at the city cemetery.

Similar to other instances of prison massacres, accusations for the NKVD's crimes were directed at the local Jewish community. As per the antisemitic canard of Jewish Bolshevism, non-Jewish inhabitants perceived Jews as synonymous with the Soviet regime and its policies of terror. Upon the entry of German troops into Sambir on June 29, Ukrainian militiamen coerced a group of local Jews into participating in the exhumation of the prison massacre victims. Throughout several days of labor, these workers faced abuse and humiliation, including being forced to drink water used to wash the victims' bodies and being confined overnight in rooms with decomposing corpses. Attacks on Jews continued after the victims' funeral. These acts of violence resulted in the death of approximately 50 Jews from Sambir. The spontaneity of this pogrom and the extent of Nazi involvement remain unclear.

The Sambir prison massacre became a tool for Nazi propaganda. In an attempt to draw international attention to the NKVD's crimes, the Germans involved International Committee of the Red Cross personnel as observers during the exhumation of the victims.

== Bibliography ==
- Mędykowski, Witold (2018). W cieniu gigantów Pogromy w 1941 r. w byłej sowieckiej strefie okupacyjnej [In the shadow of giants. Pogroms in 1941 in the former Soviet occupation zone] (in Polish). Jerozolima. ISBN 978-965-90038-0-8.
- Motyka, Grzegorz (2006). Ukraińska partyzantka 1942–1960. Działalność Organizacji Ukraińskich Nacjonalistów i Ukraińskiej Powstańczej Armii [Ukrainian guerilla 1942–1960. Activities of the Organization of Ukrainian Nationalists and the Ukrainian Insurgent Army] (in Polish). Warszawa: Instytut Studiów Politycznych PAN i Oficyna Wydawnicza RYTM. ISBN 83-88490-58-3.
- Musiał, Bogdan (2001). Rozstrzelać elementy kontrrewolucyjne. Brutalizacja wojny niemiecko-sowieckiej latem 1941 roku [Shoot the counter-revolutionary elements. The brutalization of the German-Soviet war in the summer of 1941] (in Polish). Warszawa: Stowarzyszenie Kulturalne Fronda. ISBN 83-88747-40-1.
- Popiński, Krzysztof; Kokurin, Aleksandr; Gurjanow, Aleksandr (1995). Drogi śmierci. Ewakuacja więzień sowieckich z Kresów Wschodnich II Rzeczypospolitej w czerwcu i lipcu 1941 [Roads of death. Evacuation of Soviet prisons from the Eastern Borderlands of the Second Polish Republic in June and July 1941] (in Polish). Warszawa: Wydawnictwo "Karta". ISBN 83-900676-9-2.
- Węgierski, Jerzy (1991). Lwów pod okupacją sowiecką 1939–1941 [Lviv under Soviet occupation 1939–1941] (in Polish). Warszawa: Editions Spotkania. ISBN 83-85195-15-7.
- Zbrodnicza ewakuacja więzień i aresztów NKWD na Kresach Wschodnich II Rzeczypospolitej w czerwcu – lipcu 1941 roku. Materiały z sesji naukowej w 55. rocznicę ewakuacji więźniów NKWD w głąb ZSRR, Łódź 10 czerwca 1996 r. [Criminal evacuation of NKVD prisons and detention centers in the Eastern Borderlands of the Second Polish Republic in June–July 1941. Materials from the scientific session on the 55th anniversary of the evacuation of NKVD prisoners deep into the USSR, Łódź, June 10, 1996] (in Polish). Warszawa: Główna Komisja Badania Zbrodni przeciwko Narodowi Polskiemu – Instytut Pamięci Narodowej. 1997. ISBN 83-903356-6-2.
