= NKVD prisoner massacres =

1941 mass executions of Soviet political prisoners

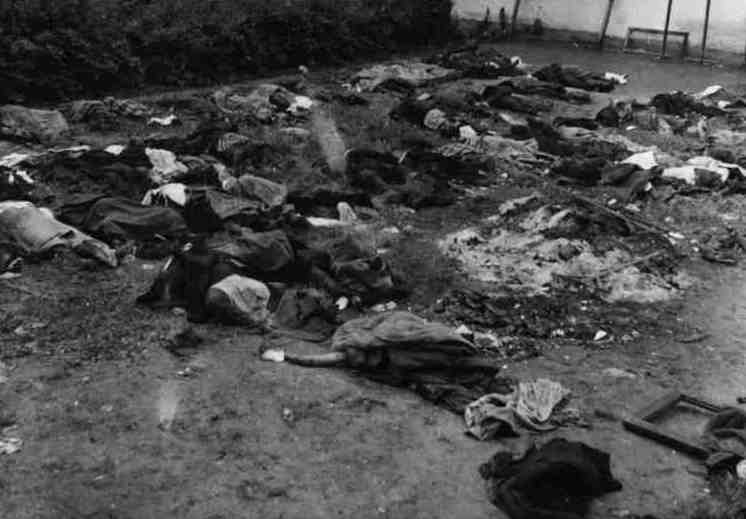
- Victims of Soviet NKVD in Lviv, June 1941
- Date: June 1941 – November 1941
- Location: Occupied Poland, Ukrainian SSR, Byelorussian SSR, the occupied Baltic states, occupied Bessarabia
- Type: Extrajudicial killings
- Participants: NKVD and NKGB (united 20 July 1941)
- Deaths: 100,000

The NKVD prisoner massacres were a series of mass executions of political prisoners carried out by the NKVD, the People's Commissariat for Internal Affairs of the Soviet Union, across Eastern Europe, primarily in Poland, Ukraine, Belarus, the Baltic states, and Bessarabia. After the start of the German invasion of the Soviet Union on June 22, 1941, NKVD troops were supposed to evacuate political prisoners to the interior of the Soviet Union, but the hasty retreat of the Red Army, a lack of transportation and other supplies, and general disregard for legal procedures often led to prisoners being simply executed.

Estimates of the death toll vary by location; nearly 9,000 in the Ukrainian SSR, 20,000–30,000 in eastern Poland (now part of Western Ukraine), with the total number reaching approximately 100,000 extrajudicial executions in the span of a few weeks.

== Background ==
Operation Barbarossa surprised the NKVD, whose jails and prisons in territories annexed by the Soviet Union in the aftermath of the Molotov–Ribbentrop Pact were crowded with political prisoners. In occupied eastern Poland, the NKVD was given responsibility for liquidating or evacuating over 140,000 prisoners (NKVD evacuation order No. 00803). In Ukraine and Western Belorussia, 60,000 people were forced to evacuate on foot. The official Soviet count had more than 9,800 reportedly executed in prisons, 1,443 executed in the process of evacuation, 59 killed for attempting to escape, 23 killed by German bombs and 1,057 deaths from other causes.

"It was not only the numbers of the executed", wrote historian Yury Boshyk, who was quoted by Orest Subtelny, of the murders, "but also the manner in which they died that shocked the populace. When the families of the arrested rushed to the prisons after the Soviet evacuation, they were aghast to find bodies so badly mutilated that many could not be identified. It was evident that many of the prisoners had also been tortured before death; others were killed en masse".

Approximately two thirds of the 150,000 prisoners were murdered; most of the rest were transported into the interior of the Soviet Union, but some were abandoned in the prisons if there was no time to execute them, and others managed to escape.

== Massacres ==
The NKVD killed prisoners in many places from Poland to Crimea. Immediately after the start of the German invasion, the NKVD started to execute large numbers of prisoners in most of their prisons, and it evacuated the remainder in death marches. Most of them were political prisoners, who were imprisoned and executed without a trial. The massacres were later documented by the occupying German authorities and were used in anti-Soviet and anti-Jewish propaganda. After the war and in recent years, the authorities of Germany, Poland, Belarus, and Israel identified no fewer than 25 prisons whose prisoners were killed and a much larger number of mass execution sites.

=== Belarus ===
- Berezwecz-Taklinovo Death Road in Berezwecz (present-day part of Hlybokaye): on the night of June 23–24, the NKVD executed at least several dozen inmates. The next day, the remaining prisoners were rushed towards Vitebsk. During the 120-kilometer march, they died en masse due to exhaustion, hunger and thirst, as well as at the hands of the guards. The last stop on the 'road of death' was the Taklinovo kolkhoz (present-day Mikalajeva), where on June 28, the Soviets executed almost all the prisoners. Approximately 1-2 thousand people were murdered in the evacuation of the prison in Berezwecz.
- Chervyen massacre near Minsk: in late June, the NKVD started evacuating all prisons in Minsk. Between June 24 and June 27, at least 1,000 people were killed in Chervyen and in the death marches.
- Hrodna (Grodno in pre-war Poland): on June 22, 1941, the NKVD executed several dozen people at the local prison. Execution of the remaining 1,700 prisoners was not possible due to the advance of the German army and hurried retreat of the NKVD executioners.
- Vileyka-Barysaw Death Road: on June 24, 1941, the NKVD executed at least 28 prisoners held in Vileyka (Wilejka in pre-war Poland). The remaining prisoners, over 1,000 men and women, were forcibly marched eastward towards Barysaw. During the march, an estimated 500 to 800 prisoners died at the hands of guards.
- Valozhyn-Tarasovo Death Road: in late June, the NKVD evacuated prisoners from Valozhyn (Wołożyn in pre-war Poland). After marching on foot for two days, approximately 100 prisoners were executed by the NKVD near the village of Tarasovo.

=== Estonia ===
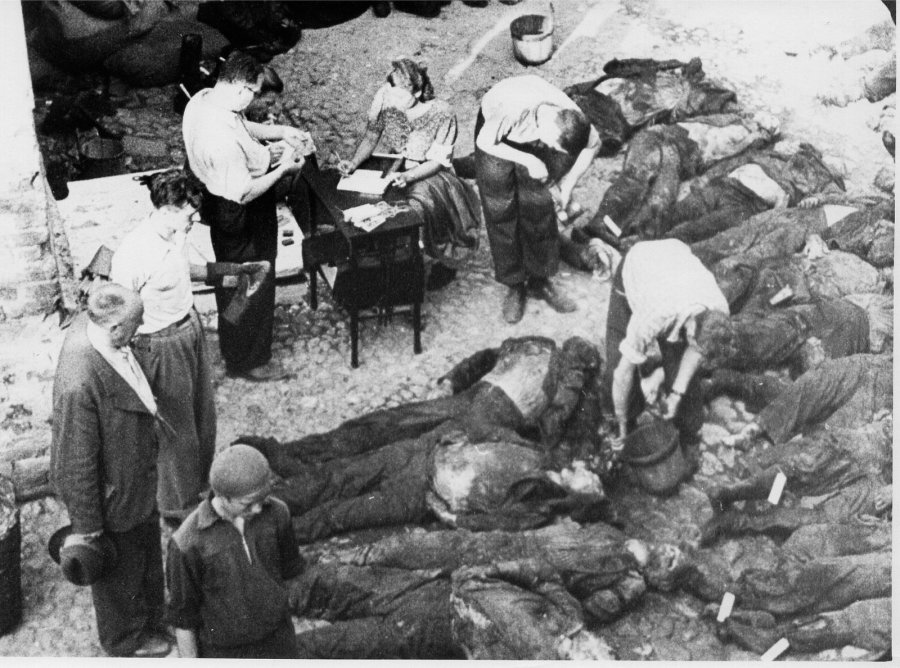
Victims of NKVD in Tartu, Estonia, July 1941

- Tartu massacre: on July 9, 1941, 193 detainees were shot in Tartu prison.

=== Lithuania ===
- Vilnius (Wilno in pre-war Poland): after the German invasion, the NKVD murdered a large number of prisoners of the infamous Lukiškės Prison.
- Rainiai massacre near Telšiai: up to 79 political prisoners were killed on June 24 and 25.
- Pravieniškės prison near Kaunas: in June 1941, the NKVD murdered 260 political prisoners and all Lithuanian personnel in the prison.
- Lithuanian prisoners were evacuated to Belarus and some of them were murdered, e.g., in the Chervyen massacre and near Bigosovo.

=== Poland ===
Memorials

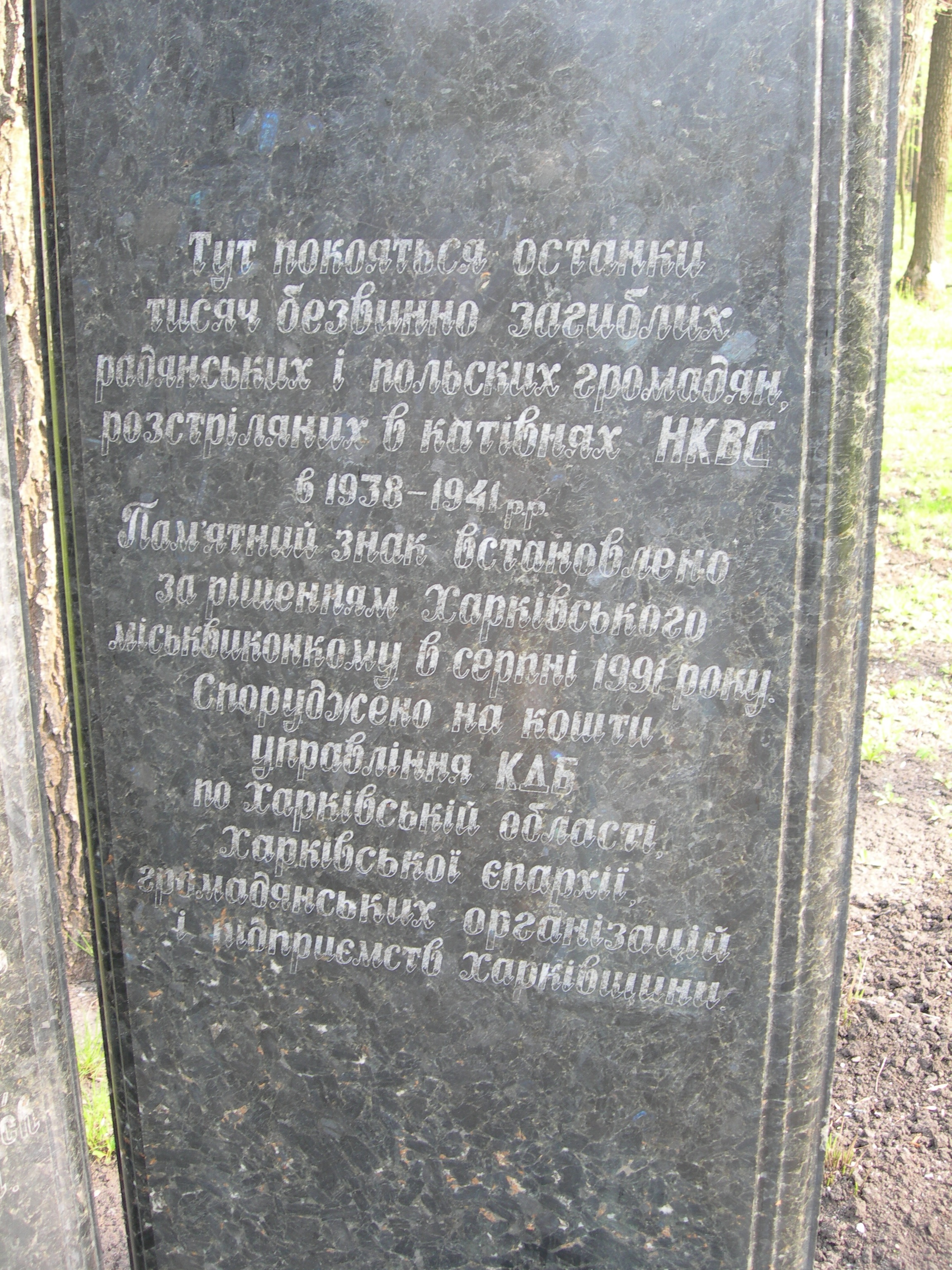
Entrance to memorial in Piatykhatky

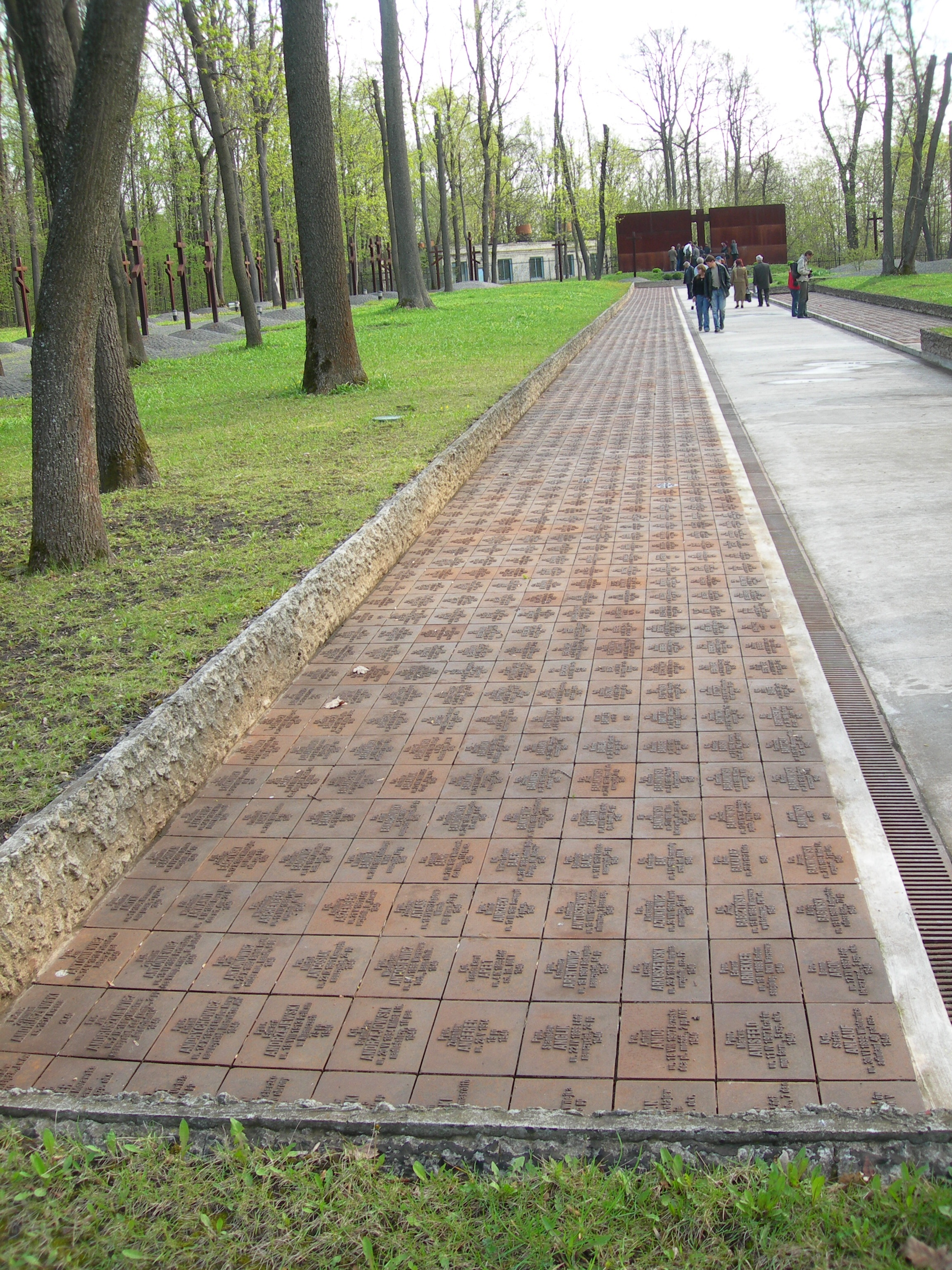
Katyn-Kharkiv memorial

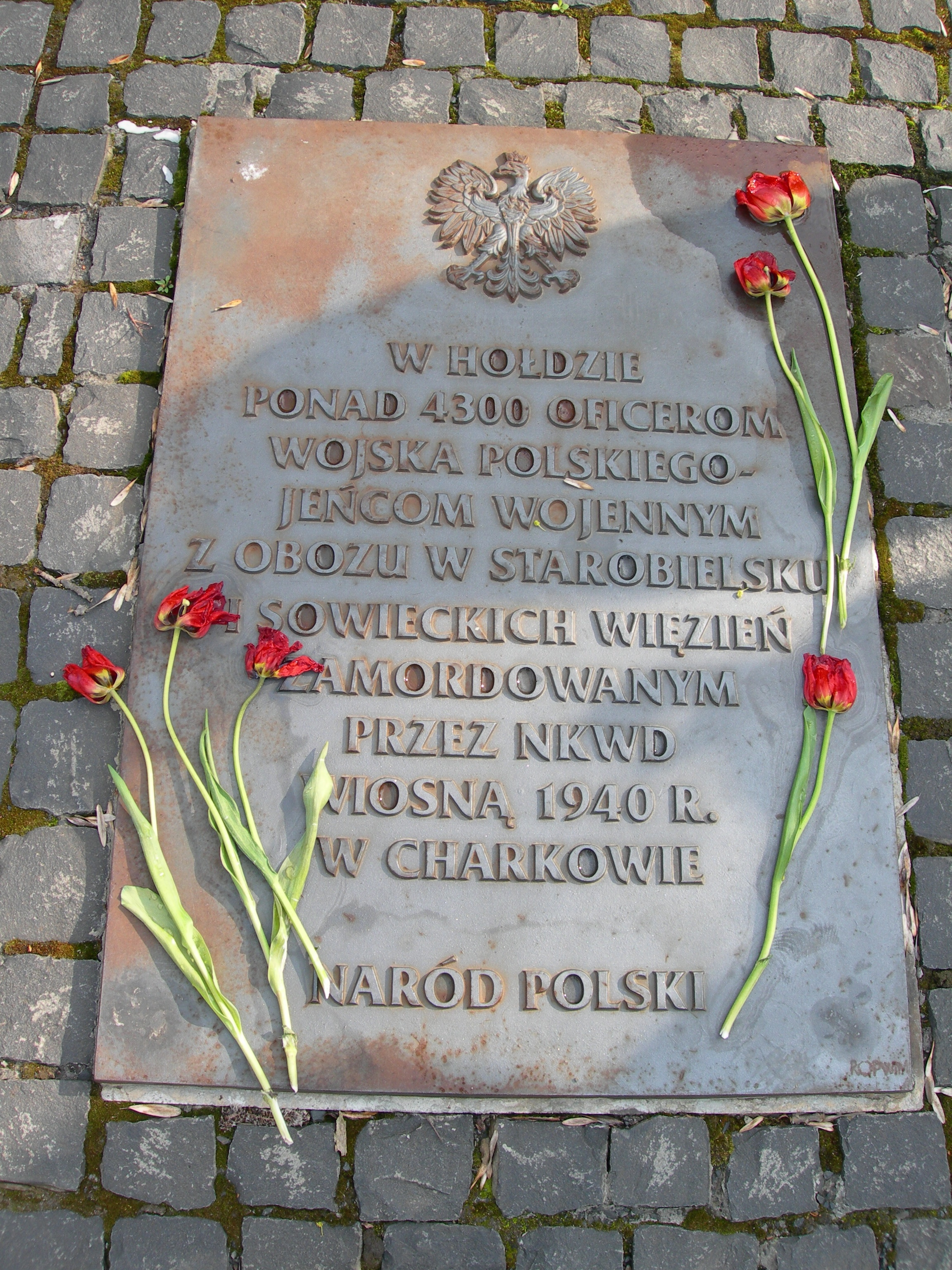
Katyn-Kharkiv memorial

By 1941, much of the ethnically Polish population living under Soviet rule in the eastern half of Poland had already been deported to remote areas of the USSR. Others, including a large number of Polish civilians of other ethnicities (mostly Belarusians and Ukrainians), were held in provisional prisons in the region, where they awaited deportation either to NKVD prisons in Moscow or to the Gulag. It is estimated that out of 13 million people living in eastern Poland, roughly half a million were jailed, and more than 90% of those were men. Thus, approximately 10% of adult males were imprisoned at the time of the German offensive. Many died in prisons from torture or neglect. Methods of torture included scalding victims and cutting off their ears, noses, and fingers. Timothy Snyder estimates that the NKVD shot some 9,817 imprisoned Polish citizens following the German invasion of the USSR in 1941.

- NKVD massacre sites in pre-war Poland are now in Lithuania, Belarus, and Ukraine.

=== Ukraine ===
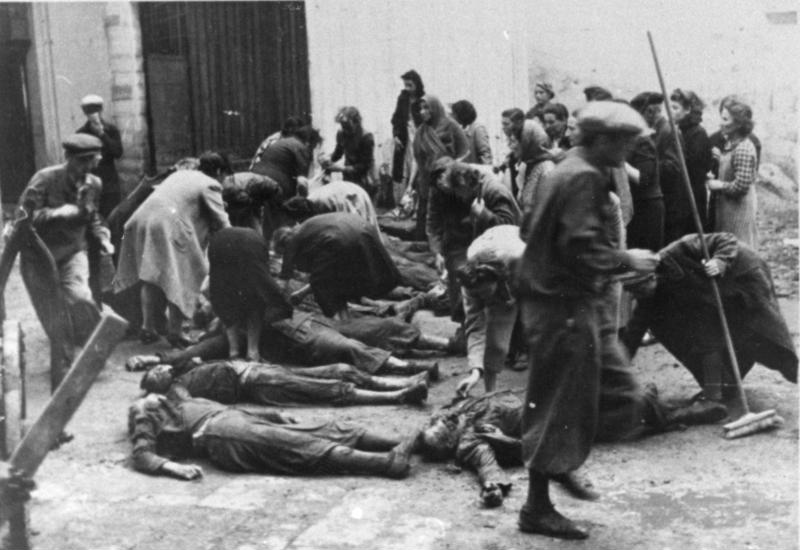
Ethnic Germans murdered at a Ternopil GPU prison as German troops approached are being identified by their relatives on July 10, 1941

In Soviet-occupied western Ukraine, under the threat of German invasion, the NKVD committed various mass murders of prison inmates, including:

- Berezhany massacre (Brzeżany in pre-war Poland): between June 26 and 30 June 1941, the crew of the NKVD prison executed from 174 to 300 Polish citizens. Among them were many Ukrainians.
- Chortkiv (Czortków in pre-war Poland): in the last days of June 1941, the Soviets executed an estimated 100 to 200 prisoners held in the local prison. The remaining prisoners were evacuated further east, either by train or on foot, while hundreds died due to the inhumane conditions of transport or at the hands of guards. At the end of July 1941, 767 prisoners evacuated from Chortkiv were executed by Soviets in Uman (the Evacuation of Chortkiv Prison).
- Dobromyl: in late June 1941, soon after the German attack on the USSR, the Soviet NKVD murdered hundreds of prisoners who had been evacuated from nearby Przemyśl, dumping their bodies into a salt mine on the outskirts of the city.
- Dubno massacre (in pre-war Poland): between 23 and 25 June 1941, the Soviets executed an estimated 500 to 550 prisoners held in the Dubno prison. Only a few individuals survived the massacre.
- Ivano-Frankivsk (Stanisławów in pre-war Poland): Over 500 Polish prisoners (including 150 women and dozens of children) were shot by the NKVD and buried in several mass graves at Dem'ianiv Laz.
- Lutsk massacre (Łuck in pre-war Poland): After the prison was hit by German bombs, Soviet authorities promised amnesty to all political prisoners to prevent escapes. As they lined up outside, they were machine-gunned by Soviet tanks. They were told: "Those still alive get up." Some 370 stood up and were forced to bury the dead, after which they were murdered as well. The Nazi foreign ministry claimed 1,500 Ukrainians were killed, while the SS and Nazi military intelligence claimed 4,000.
- Lviv (Lwów in pre-war Poland, Executions in Lviv (June 1941)): the massacres in this city began immediately after the German attack, on June 22, and continued until June 28. The NKVD executed several thousand inmates in a number of provisional prisons. Among the most common methods of extermination were shooting prisoners in their cells, throwing grenades into the cells or starving them to death in the cellars. Some were simply bayoneted to death. It is estimated that over 4000 people were murdered that way, while the number of survivors is estimated at 270. A Ukrainian uprising briefly forced the NKVD to retreat, but it soon returned to kill the remaining prisoners in their cells. In the aftermath, medical students described the scene at one of the prisons:

"From the courtyard, doors led to a large space, filled from top to bottom with corpses...Among them were many women. On the left wall, three men were crucified, barely covered by clothing from their shoulders, with severed male organs. Underneath them on the floor in half-sitting, leaning positions – two nuns with those organs in their mouths...most were stabbed in the stomach with a bayonet. Some were naked or almost naked, others in decent street clothes. One man was in a tie, mostly likely just arrested."

These massacres were followed by the Lviv pogroms, committed by the German military and the Organization of Ukrainian Nationalists after the German takeover of the city. Jewish residents of the city were targeted by German soldiers, OUN members, and local citizens. In some instances, the pogroms and violence against Jewish residents was framed as justified revenge for the murders committed by the NKVD.

- Sambir massacre (Sambor in pre-war Poland): in the last days of June 1941, the Soviets executed an estimated 500 to 700 prisoners in the Sambir prison. During the latter stage of the massacre, some prisoners actively resisted, which resulted in saving their lives.
- Zolochiv massacre (Złoczów in pre-war Poland): in the last days of June 1941, the Soviets executed all inmates at Zolochiv prison, an estimated 650 to 720 individuals.

Massacres in other parts of Ukraine:

- Donetsk: Rutchenkovo Field
- Kharkiv tragedy: 1,200 prisoners were burned alive.
- Simferopol: on October 31, the NKVD shot a number of people in the NKVD building and the city prison.
- Yalta: on November 4, the NKVD shot all the prisoners in the city prisons.

Soviet statistics for 78 Ukrainian prisons:

- evacuated 45,569
- killed inside the prisons 8,789
- killed runaways 48
- killed legally 123
- killed illegally 55
- left alive 3,536

=== Russia ===
- Oryol: In September 1941, 157 political prisoners (among them Christian Rakovsky, Varvara Yakovleva, Maria Spiridonova, Olga Kameneva, and Dmitri Pletnyov) were executed in Medvedevsky Forest near Oryol.
- Kuybyshev: On 28 October 1941, 20 high ranking ex-Red Army officers and party officials were shot without trial in the village of Barbysh, Kuybyshev.

== See also ==
- Bykivnia Graves
- List of World War II prisoner-of-war camps in the Soviet Union
- Mass graves in the Soviet Union
- Monument to the Fallen and Murdered in the East
- Polish prisoners-of-war in the Soviet Union after 1939
- Territories of Poland annexed by the Soviet Union
- Soviet atrocities committed against prisoners of war during World War II
- Soviet repressions of Polish citizens (1939–1946)
- World War II crimes in Poland

== Bibliography ==
- Mikoda, Janina, ed. (1997). Zbrodnicza ewakuacja więzień i aresztów NKWD na Kresach Wschodnich II Rzeczypospolitej w czerwcu – lipcu 1941 roku. Materiały z sesji naukowej w 55. rocznicę ewakuacji więźniów NKWD w głąb ZSRR, Łódź 10 czerwca 1996 r. [Criminal evacuation of NKVD prisons and detention centers in the Eastern Borderlands of the Second Polish Republic in June–July 1941. Materials from the scientific session on the 55th anniversary of the evacuation of NKVD prisoners deep into the USSR, Łódź, June 10, 1996] (in Polish). Warszawa: Główna Komisja Badania Zbrodni przeciwko Narodowi Polskiemu – Instytut Pamięci Narodowej. ISBN 83-903356-6-2.
- Musiał, Bogdan (2001). Rozstrzelać elementy kontrrewolucyjne. Brutalizacja wojny niemiecko-sowieckiej latem 1941 roku [Shoot the counter-revolutionary elements. The brutalization of the German-Soviet war in the summer of 1941] (in Polish). Warszawa: Stowarzyszenie Kulturalne Fronda. ISBN 83-88747-40-1.
- Popiński, Krzysztof; Kokurin, Aleksandr; Gurjanow, Aleksandr (1995). Drogi śmierci. Ewakuacja więzień sowieckich z Kresów Wschodnich II Rzeczypospolitej w czerwcu i lipcu 1941 [Roads of death. Evacuation of Soviet prisons from the Eastern Borderlands of the Second Polish Republic in June and July 1941] (in Polish). Warszawa: Wydawnictwo "Karta". ISBN 83-900676-9-2.
- Węgierski, Jerzy (1991). Lwów pod okupacją sowiecką 1939–1941 [Lviv under Soviet occupation 1939–1941] (in Polish). Warszawa: Editions Spotkania. ISBN 83-85195-15-7.
