= NKVD prisoner massacre in Dubno =

Soviet war crime

- Part of occupation of Poland (1939–1945)
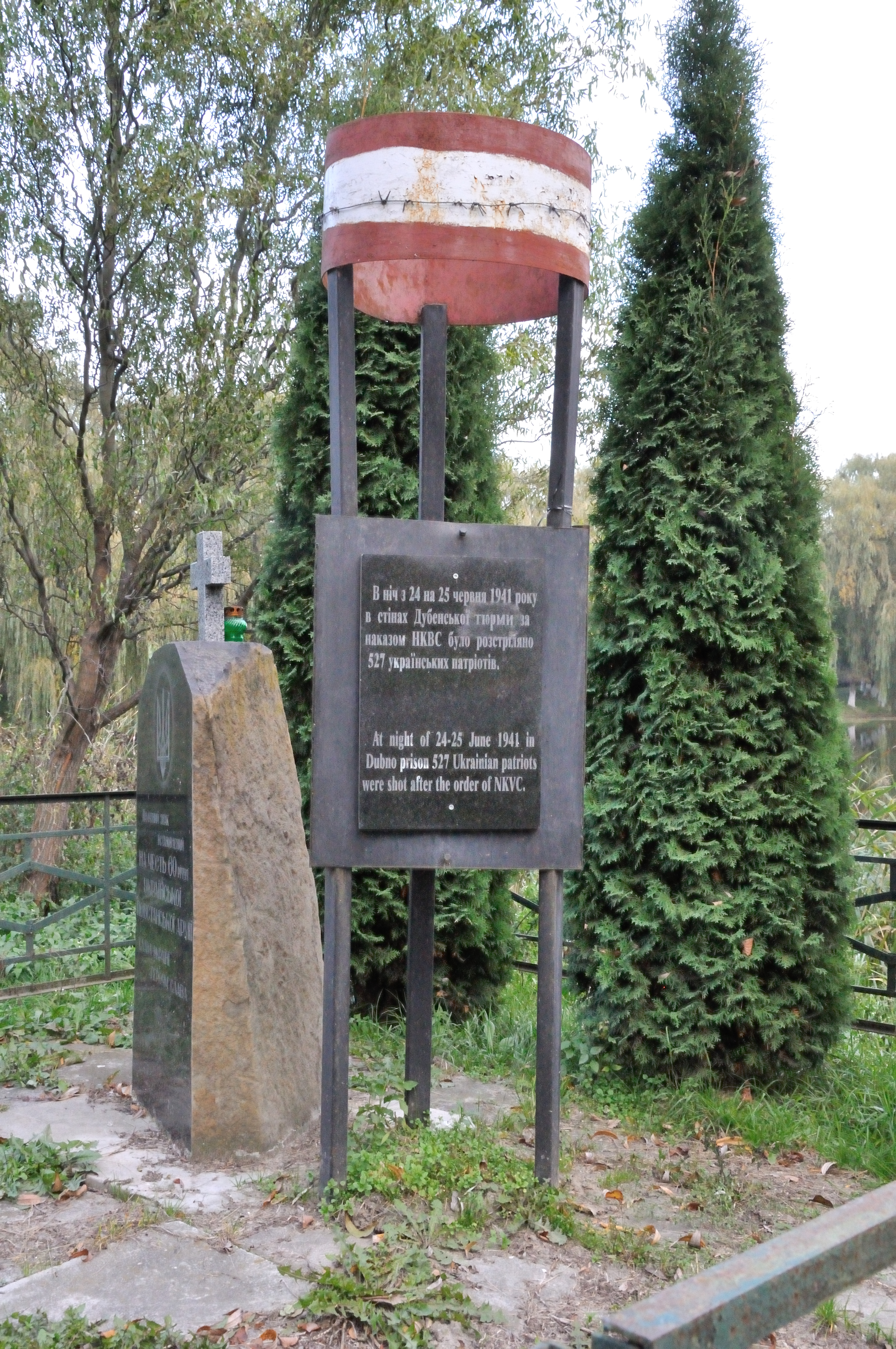
- Memorial in Dubno commemorating victims of the massacre
- Location: 50°25′00″N 25°45′15″E; Dubno, Eastern Poland/Western Ukraine
- Date: June 23–25, 1941
- Target: Prisoners, mostly Ukrainians and Poles
- Attack type: mass murder
- Deaths: 500–550
- Perpetrator: NKVD

The NKVD prisoner massacre in Dubno was a Soviet war crime conducted by the NKVD in the city of Dubno, then in occupied Poland and now in Ukraine. Between 23 and 25 June 1941, following the German invasion of the USSR, the Soviets executed an estimated 500 to 550 prisoners held in the Dubno prison. This atrocity was one of several prisoner massacres carried out by the Soviet secret police and army during the summer of 1941.

== Background ==
During the interwar period, Dubno (Ukrainian: Ду́бно) was located within the borders of the Second Polish Republic and served as the center of Dubno county in Wołyń Voivodeship. After the German-Soviet invasion of Poland in 1939, the city fell under Soviet occupation.

Those apprehended by the NKVD were confined in the cells of a pre-war Polish prison. The prison building was located at Majora Matczyńskiego Street, in the eastern suburb of Dubno (so-called Surmicze), at the banks of the Ikva River, with some distance from more dense urban development. The prison in Dubno was one of four Soviet prisons operating in Rivne Oblast. It was referred to as 'Prison No. 2' in Soviet official documents.

On June 22, 1941, Nazi Germany invaded the Soviet Union. Due to the swift progress of the German offensive, the NKVD began exterminating political prisoners in the war zone. In the summer of 1941, in the part of Poland occupied by the USSR, an estimated 20,000 to 30,000 individuals were murdered in prisons and detention centers.

== Massacre ==
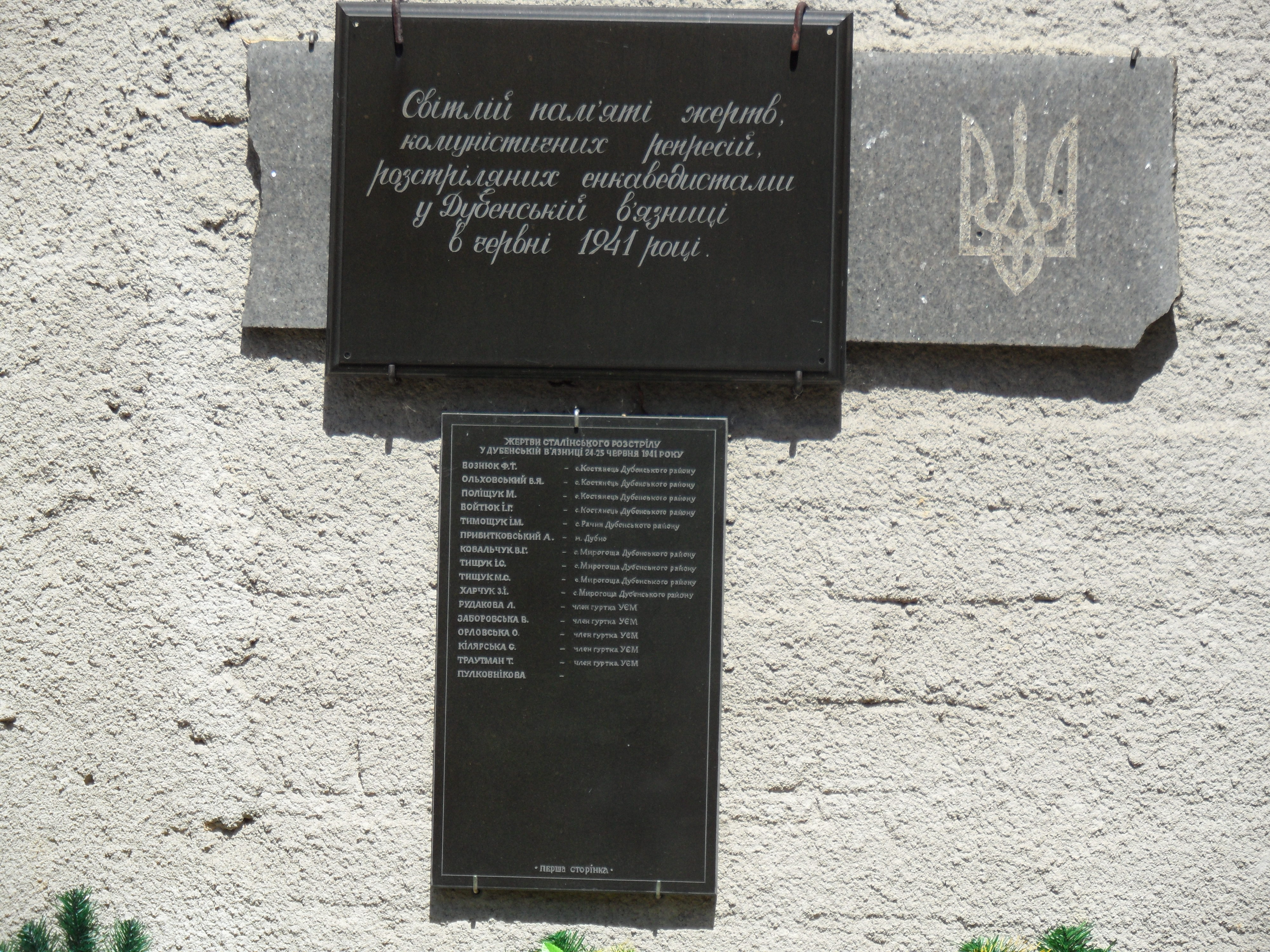
Plaques at the prison wall, commemorating victims of the massacre

According to documents from Soviet archives, as of June 10, 1941, the prison in Dubno held 816 inmates. Additional NKVD records from June 1941 concerning the planned evacuation of the prisoners from Dubno indicated an intended evacuation of 696 or 738 inmates. Bogdan Musiał estimated that approximately 600 people were held in the cells of Dubno prison shortly before the outbreak of the German-Soviet war. The majority of the prisoners were Ukrainians and Poles, primarily residents of Dubno and Kremenets counties, as well as individuals from the southern part of the Zdolbuniv county.

Upon learning of the outbreak of war, the Soviets darkened the prison building, increased the number of guards at its most important points, and tightened discipline, including forbidding walks. From the morning hours of June 22, prisoners were no longer served meals.

Dubno was located on the main direction of the German offensive, hence the NKVD began the mass liquidation of prisoners on the night of June 23–24. Due to the rapid advance of the German troops toward Dubno, the massacre was carried out very hastily, with no attempts to cover up its traces or hide the bodies. NKVD men went from cell to cell, starting from the ground floor, ordering the prisoners to line up in front of the door. Then they fired a burst of automatic weapons at them through the viewfinder or threw hand grenades into cells. (Note: It is not certain whether the NKVD men used this method of killing from the beginning of the massacre or adopted it only as a result of resistance from prisoners. See: Abramowicz (1997), p. 113.) If the victims showed signs of life, the NKVD men opened the doors and finished off the wounded with a pistol shot or a bayonet blow. However, they were usually afraid to go deep into the men's cells, which is why some of the prisoners staying there had a chance of survival, especially if they had managed to hide in the corners of the room. However, the perpetrators had no such fears in the case of women's cells, so among the survivors, female prisoners constituted a clear minority.

In his report dated June 28, 1941, the prison warden claimed that it was impossible to evacuate prisoners. Consequently, the deputy head of the NKVD for the Rivne Oblast, Lieutenant of State Security Klimov, ordered by telephone the execution of individuals convicted or accused of "counter-revolutionary crimes." According to the inhabitants of Dubno, the massacre was led by the head of the local NKVD post, named Winokur or Winokurow (of Jewish origins). He was said to have personally murdered dozens of prisoners. Both NKVD officers subordinated to him, and prison guards, participated in the executions. Surviving prisoners claimed that during the massacre, one of the young female guards, a Jewish woman named Kagan (according to other sources her name was Hanna Berenstein), was particularly cruel.

The NKVD reports indicate that in the Dubno prison, 230 prisoners "decreased according to the first category," indicating they were executed. They also inform that 170 people, usually imprisoned for minor crimes, were released, and 250 prisoners were evacuated to Rivne, with 20 sick and disabled people "abandoned on the way."

Polish investigators and historians estimate that approximately 500–550 prisoners fell victim to the massacre. Similar numbers are also provided by German and Ukrainian sources. The victims were to include, among others: Polish women with small children, even infants, detained while trying to illegally cross the German-Soviet border. One of the murdered was Teresa Trautman – a member of the Volhynian Rural Youth Union (Polish: Wołyński Związek Młodzieży Wiejskiej), one of the organizers of the Union of Armed Struggle in Volhynia.

Only a few prisoners survived the massacre. One German report stated that there were only eight of them. In turn, the prison warden estimated the number of inmates left in their cells at approximately 60–70 people. After the perpetrators escaped, some of the survivors managed to break down the cell doors and escape through holes in the walls made by German bombs. Injured prisoners were transported to a hospital on the river island of Pentalia.

== Aftermath ==
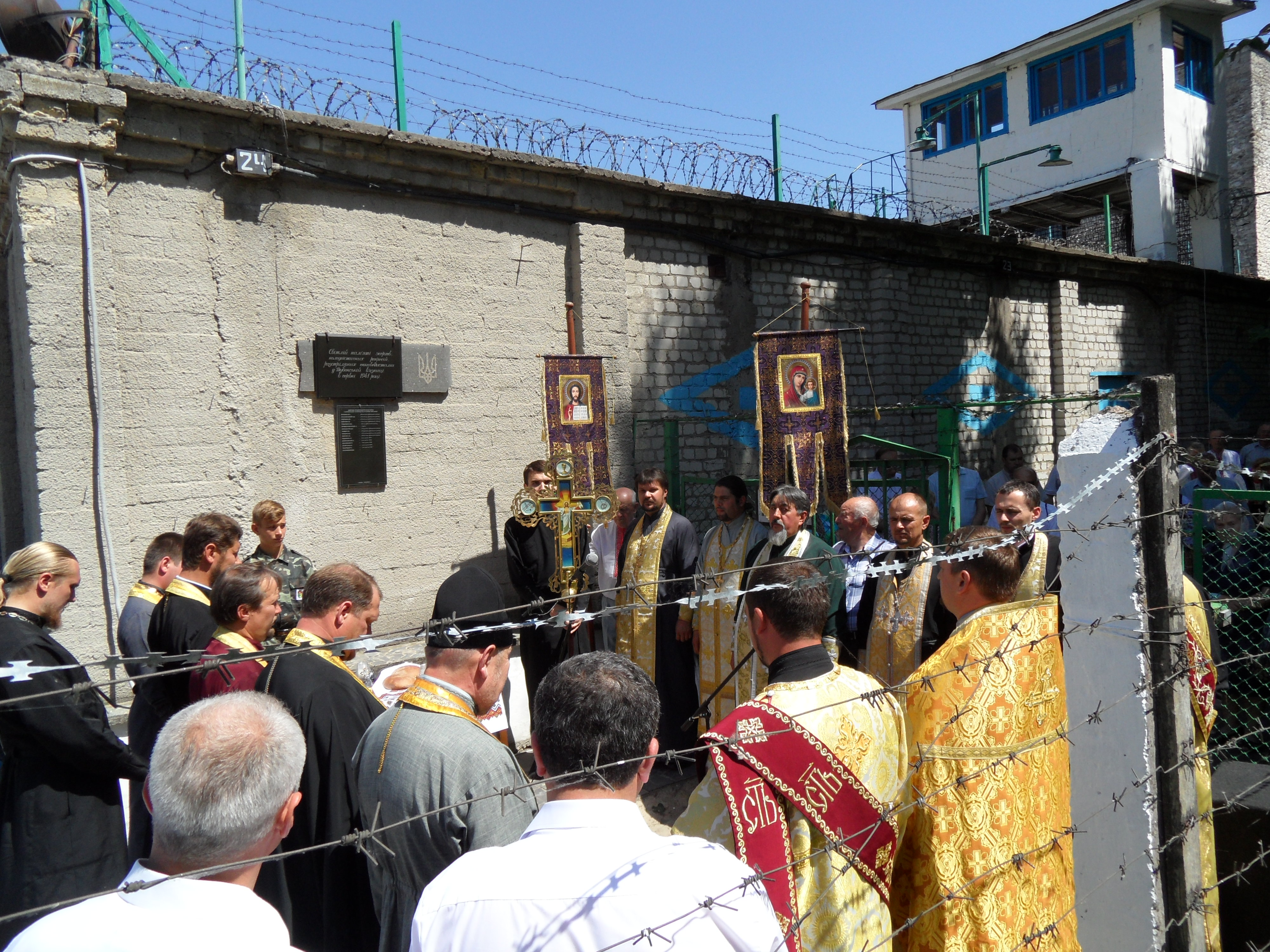
Commemoration of the 72nd anniversary of massacre, June 2013

On June 25, Dubno was taken by the Wehrmacht. The inhabitants of the city went to the deserted prison, hoping to find their arrested relatives and friends. Witnesses recalled that the site of the massacre was a gruesome sight. Corridors, stairs, and even basements were flooded with streams of blood. There were reports that "some women in Dubno who found murdered relatives apparently were so upset that they rammed their heads into the prison cell walls". The report of the Geheime Feldpolizei, whose officers inspected the site of the massacre on June 27, included information that the bodies found in the prison bore traces of brutal torture, for example, the peeling of skin from the hands. Evidence of rape was allegedly also observed in some female corpses. (Note: The testimony and accounts of witnesses involved in the exhumation of the victims of the NKVD prisoner massacres repeatedly mention bodies bearing signs of severe torture. However, according to Bogdan Musiał, injuries initially thought to be signs of torture were likely a result of rapid decomposition of the corpses, accelerated by the summer heat, as well as scavengers and unskilled handling during exhumation (see: Musiał (2001), pp. 236–237). At times, executions were hastily carried out using grenades and machine guns, resulting in severe injuries to the victims (see: Musiał (2001), p. 236). Also, he believes that in Eastern Galicia and Volhynia, there were cases where, after the departure of the Soviets, the bodies of NKVD victims were purposely mutilated by Ukrainian nationalists seeking to depict dramatic examples of their nation's martyrdom for propaganda purposes (see: Musiał (2001), pp. 237–240).)

A dozen or so kilometers outside Dubno, a group of prison guards and NKVD men retreating to the east was captured by the Germans and then executed. Among those killed was chief of the local NKVD post Winokur/Winokurow. One witness claimed that after intercepting the column, he killed his wife and daughter and then committed suicide. The fate of the female guard Kagan is unknown. According to one account, she managed to escape from the Nazis.

As in other instances of prison massacres, the local Jewish community got blamed for the actions of the NKVD. As per the antisemitic canard of Jewish Bolshevism, non-Jewish inhabitants perceived Jews as synonymous with the Soviet regime and its policies of terror. Antisemitic sentiments were further fueled by reports alleging that communist functionaries of Jewish origin played a crucial role during the prison massacre. After the Germans took control of Dubno, residents instigated a pogrom.

Subsequently, the first anti-Jewish aktion instigated by the Nazis took place on June 30, 1941, during which 23 Jews accused of collaboration with the NKVD were executed. Further anti-Jewish actions took place in July and August 1941.

== Bibliography ==
- Abramowicz, Sławomir (1997). "Więzienia NKWD w Dubnie i Łucku w czerwcu 1941 r" [NKVD prisons in Dubno and Lutsk in June 1941]. In Mikoda, Janina (ed.). Zbrodnicza ewakuacja więzień i aresztów NKWD na Kresach Wschodnich II Rzeczypospolitej w czerwcu – lipcu 1941 roku. Materiały z sesji naukowej w 55. rocznicę ewakuacji więźniów NKWD w głąb ZSRR, Łódź 10 czerwca 1996 r. [Criminal evacuation of NKVD prisons and detention centers in the Eastern Borderlands of the Second Polish Republic in June-July 1941. Materials from the scientific session on the 55th anniversary of the evacuation of NKVD prisoners deep into the USSR, Łódź, June 10, 1996] (in Polish). Warszawa: Główna Komisja Badania Zbrodni przeciwko Narodowi Polskiemu – Instytut Pamięci Narodowej. ISBN 83-903356-6-2.
- Berkhoff, Karel C. (2004). Harvest of Despair: life and death in Ukraine under Nazi rule. Cambridge, Massachusetts; London, England: Belknap Press of Harvard University Press. ISBN 0-674-01313-1.
- Dean, Martin C.; Hecker, Mel (2012). Encyclopedia of Camps and Ghettos, 1933–1945. Vol. II: Ghettos in German-Occupied Eastern Europe. Bloomington, Indianapolis: United States Holocaust Memorial Museum, Indiana University Press. ISBN 978-0-253-00202-0.
- Głowacki, Albin (1997). "Organizacja i funkcjonowanie więziennictwa NKWD na Kresach Wschodnich II Rzeczypospolitej w latach 1939–1941" [Organization and functioning of the NKVD prison system in the Eastern Borderlands of the Second Polish Republic in 1939–1941]. In Mikoda, Janina (ed.). Zbrodnicza ewakuacja więzień i aresztów NKWD na Kresach Wschodnich II Rzeczypospolitej w czerwcu – lipcu 1941 roku. Materiały z sesji naukowej w 55. rocznicę ewakuacji więźniów NKWD w głąb ZSRR, Łódź 10 czerwca 1996 r. [Criminal evacuation of NKVD prisons and detention centers in the Eastern Borderlands of the Second Polish Republic in June-July 1941. Materials from the scientific session on the 55th anniversary of the evacuation of NKVD prisoners deep into the USSR, Łódź, June 10, 1996] (in Polish). Warszawa: Główna Komisja Badania Zbrodni przeciwko Narodowi Polskiemu – Instytut Pamięci Narodowej. ISBN 83-903356-6-2.
- Musiał, Bogdan (2001). Rozstrzelać elementy kontrrewolucyjne. Brutalizacja wojny niemiecko-sowieckiej latem 1941 roku [Shoot the counter-revolutionary elements. The brutalization of the German-Soviet war in the summer of 1941] (in Polish). Warszawa: Stowarzyszenie Kulturalne Fronda. ISBN 83-88747-40-1.
- Popiński, Krzysztof; Kokurin, Aleksandr; Gurjanow, Aleksandr (1995). Drogi śmierci. Ewakuacja więzień sowieckich z Kresów Wschodnich II Rzeczypospolitej w czerwcu i lipcu 1941 [Roads of death. Evacuation of Soviet prisons from the Eastern Borderlands of the Second Polish Republic in June and July 1941] (in Polish). Warszawa: Wydawnictwo "Karta". ISBN 83-900676-9-2.
- Solonin, Mark (2015). Czerwiec 1941. Ostateczna diagnoza [June 1941. Final diagnosis] (in Polish). Poznań: Dom Wydawniczy Rebis. ISBN 978-83-7818-616-8.
- Wnuk, Rafał (2007). "Za pierwszego Sowieta". Polska konspiracja na Kresach Wschodnich II Rzeczypospolitej (wrzesień 1939 – czerwiec 1941) ["Under the First Soviet": Polish conspiracy in the Eastern Borderlands of the Second Polish Republic (September 1939 – June 1941)] (in Polish). Warszawa: Instytut Pamięci Narodowej i Instytut Studiów Politycznych PAN. ISBN 978-83-60464-47-2.
