= NKVD prisoner massacre in Zolochiv =

- Part of occupation of Poland (1939–1945)
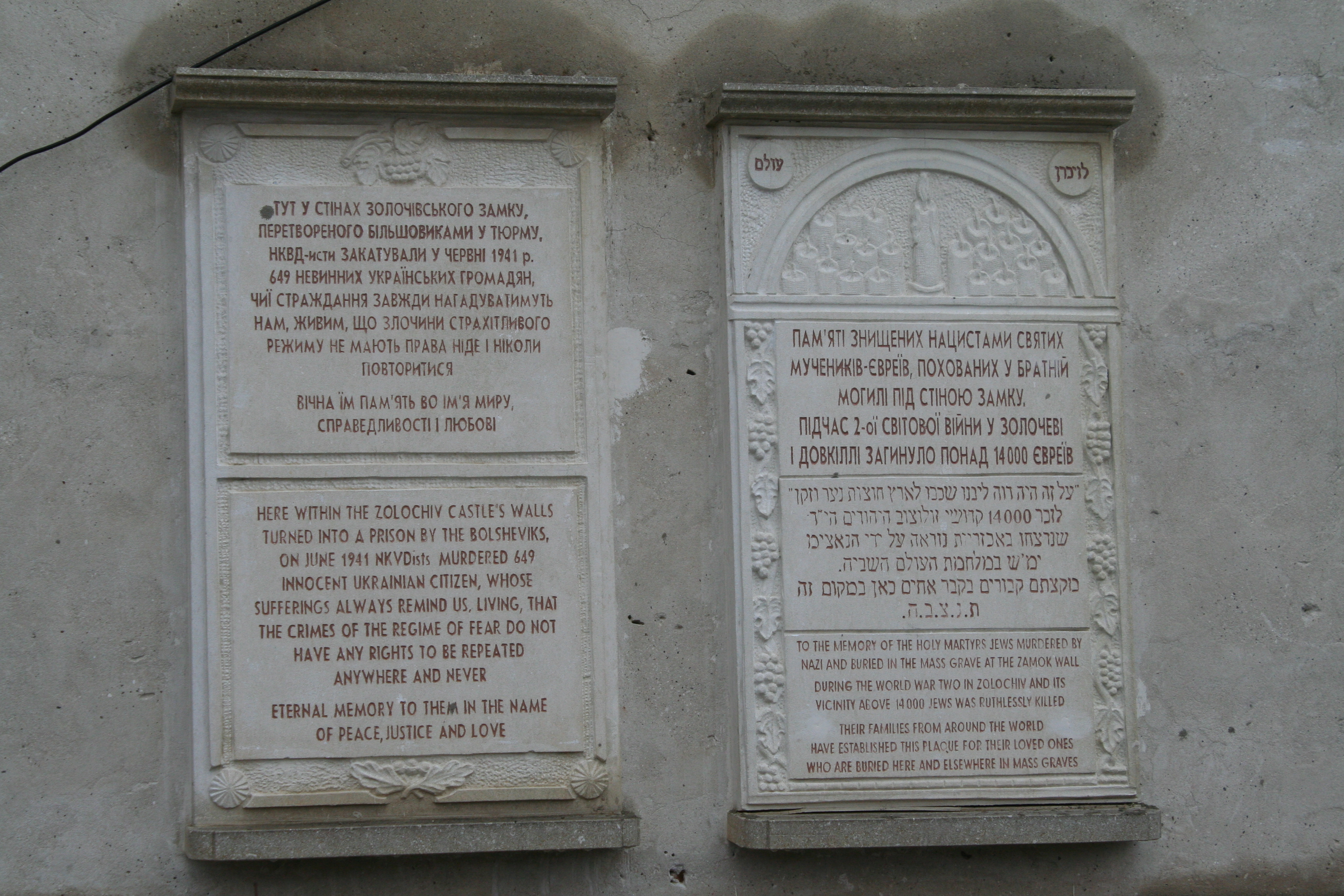
- Plaques at Zolochiv Castle commemorating victims of the massacre
- Location: 49°48′08″N 24°54′22″E; Zolochiv, Eastern Poland/Western Ukraine
- Date: Last days of June 1941
- Target: Prisoners, mostly Ukrainians and Poles
- Attack type: mass murder
- Deaths: 650–720
- Perpetrator: NKVD

The NKVD prisoner massacre in Zolochiv was a Soviet war crime conducted by the NKVD in the city of Zolochiv, then in occupied Poland and now in Ukraine. In the last days of June 1941, following the German invasion of the USSR, the Soviets executed an estimated 650 to 720 prisoners held in the Zolochiv prison. This atrocity was one of several prisoner massacres carried out by the Soviet secret police and army during the summer of 1941.

== Background ==
During the interwar period, Zolochiv (Ukrainian: Золочів, Polish: Złoczów) was located within the borders of the Second Polish Republic and served as the center of Zolochiv county in Tarnopol Voivodeship. After the German-Soviet invasion of Poland in 1939, the city fell under Soviet occupation.

Those apprehended by the NKVD were confined in the cells of a pre-war Polish prison in the Zolochiv Castle in Tarnopolska Street, on a hill in the eastern part of the city. The prison in Zolochiv was one of four Soviet prisons operating in Lviv Oblast. It was referred to as 'Prison No. 3' in Soviet official documents.

On June 22, 1941, Nazi Germany invaded the Soviet Union. Due to the swift progress of the German offensive, the NKVD began exterminating political prisoners in the war zone. In the summer of 1941, in the part of Poland occupied by the USSR, an estimated 20,000 to 30,000 individuals were murdered in prisons and detention centers.

== Massacre ==
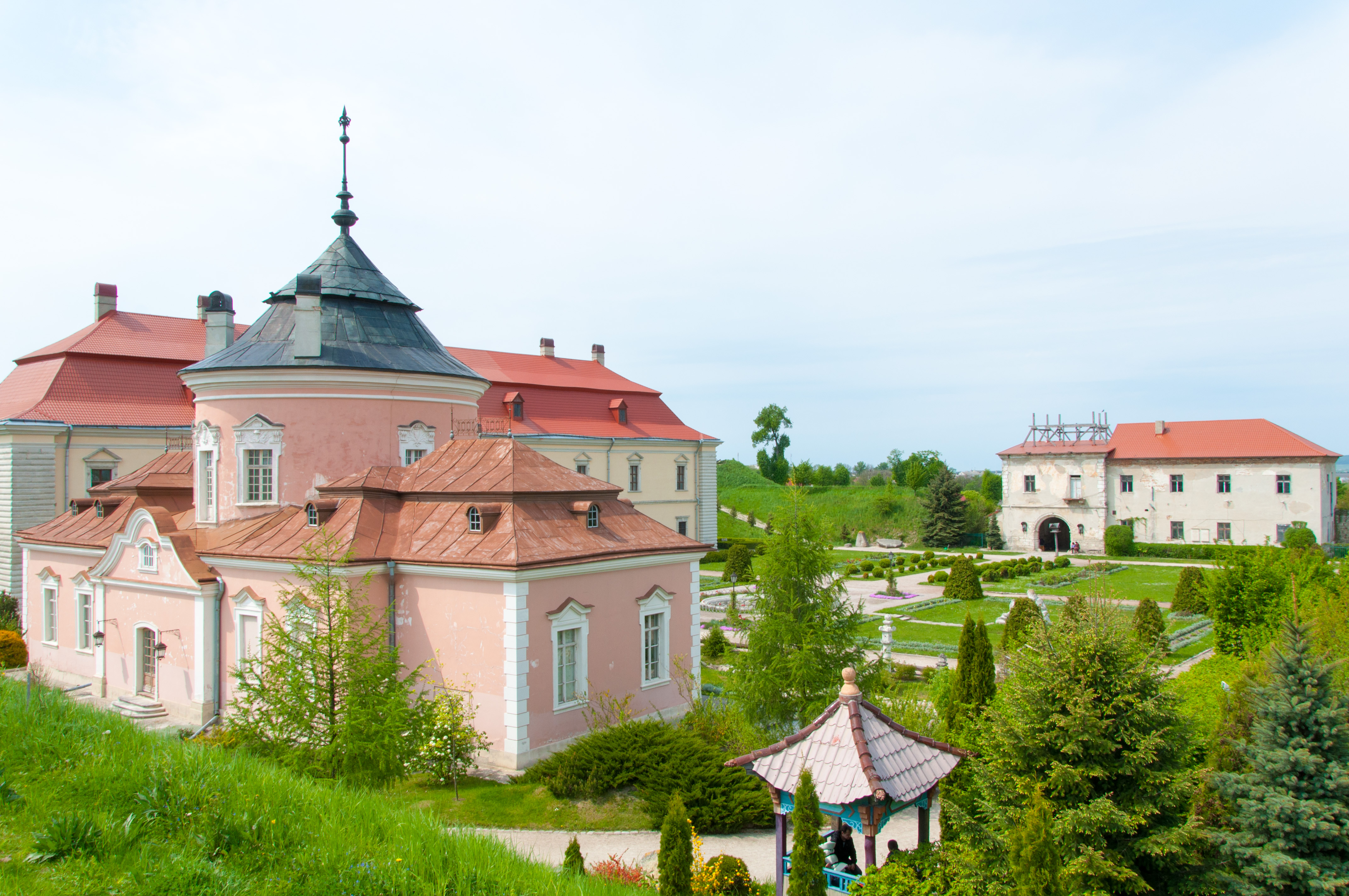
Zolochiv Castle where the NKVD prison was located

According to documents from Soviet archives, as of June 10, 1941, the prison in Zolochiv held 625 inmates. However, the number of prisoners was probably higher when the massacre commenced, as after the German invasion began, the NKVD began mass arrests of alleged 'enemies of the people.' These individuals were not registered in the prison records. After the outbreak of the German-Soviet war, militants of the Organization of Ukrainian Nationalists unsuccessfully attempted to capture the prison.

Shortly thereafter, the prison guard was strengthened and NKVD personnel began liquidating the prisoners. No prisoners survived to provide details on the exact course of the massacre. Nevertheless, the local population heard shots and screams coming from the castle day and night, which the Soviets tried to drown out with the roar of truck or tractor engines.

On July 1, 1941, German troops entered Zolochiv. Some inhabitants went to the Castle hoping to find relatives and friends there who had been arrested. However, no one was found alive in the deserted prison. (Note: One witness testified that after the Soviets left, a prisoner was found alive in the castle, supposedly hidden in the chimney flue. However, this lacks confirmation from other sources. See: Dynowski (1997), p. 136.) Only shallow (Note: The bodies of the murdered prisoners were buried at a depth of 0.5 to 1 meter. See: Dynowski (1997), p. 135 and Musiał (2001), p. 146.) mass graves were discovered, covered with turf. Two graves were discovered in the inner courtyard, another two or three in the orchard, and others under the prison wall. Bodies were also found in cells and in the chapel. (Note: Some prison documentation, including personal files of prisoners, was also found in the castle. See: Popiński, Kokurin i Gurjanow (1995), pp. 17, 29.) Most bodies had gunshot wounds, but some showed signs of bayonets, blows with a blunt instrument, and even torture. (Note: The testimony and accounts of witnesses involved in the exhumation of the victims of the NKVD prisoner massacres repeatedly mention bodies bearing signs of severe torture. However, according to Bogdan Musiał, injuries initially thought to be signs of torture were likely a result of rapid decomposition of the corpses, accelerated by the summer heat, as well as scavengers and unskilled handling during exhumation (see: Musiał (2001), pp. 236–237). At times, executions were hastily carried out using grenades and machine guns, resulting in severe injuries to the victims (see: Musiał (2001), p. 236). Also, he believes that in Eastern Galicia and Volhynia, there were cases where, after the departure of the Soviets, the bodies of NKVD victims were purposely mutilated by Ukrainian nationalists seeking to depict dramatic examples of their nation's martyrdom for propaganda purposes (see: Musiał (2001), pp. 237–240).) Bodies of pregnant women were also found in the graves. The bodies buried in graves under the prison wall were in such an advanced state of decomposition that the Germans forbade their exhumation. They issued an order to sprinkle them with lime and bury them again. (Note: These badly decomposing bodies likely belonged to prisoners who died or were murdered by the NKVD before the outbreak of the German-Soviet war. See: Musiał (2001), pp. 150–151.)

Austrian soldier and writer Bruno Brehm recalled:

Thousands of flies buzzed over the eight or ten long rows of bodies laid here. Among them walked bent women, still sobbing, trying to find their husbands and sons among the dead.

The exact number of victims remains difficult to determine. The July 12, 1941 report by Captain of State Security Andrei Filippov, head of the prison board of the NKVD of the Ukrainian SSR, provides only summary information about the fate of inmates from four prisons in Lviv Oblast (three in Lviv, one in Zolochiv). According to this document, a total of 2,464 inmates from both cities were reported as "decreased according to the first category", indicating they were executed. Ukrainian sources estimated the number of murdered at 649–752, while the German sources at approximately 700. Other witnesses, however, estimated that the number of victims was 650, 700 or 720 people. (Note: While some witnesses estimated the number of victims as high as 1,800–2,000, these figures are likely overestimates. See: Dynowski (1997), p. 136.) One-quarter of the victims were women. During the exhumation, approximately 80 corpses were identified, including 10 Jewish merchants from Zolochiv and the surrounding area.

The 1995 publication Roads of Death by KARTA Center included information about a column of approximately one hundred prisoners led out of Zolochiv prison. The prison warden allegedly told them that they would be taken to the nearest railway station and from there deeper into the Soviet Union. In fact, almost all the prisoners were shot near the village of Folwarki (today Pidhorodne). Only three people survived by escaping in the confusion caused by the German air raid. However, information about this crime is not confirmed in later studies on the NKVD prison massacres.

== Aftermath ==
The bodies of identified victims were taken away by their families. The remaining bodies, over a hundred in number, were buried in a mass grave at the local Catholic cemetery. The funeral ceremony of the victims of the prison massacre took place on July 6. Several thousand residents of Zolochiv took part.

As in other instances of prison massacres, the local Jewish community got blamed for the actions of the NKVD. As per the antisemitic canard of Jewish Bolshevism, non-Jewish inhabitants perceived Jews as synonymous with the Soviet regime and its policies of terror. Furthermore, acts of violence against the Jews of Zolochiv were probably inspired by members of one of the subunits of Einsatzgruppe C, who were in the city in the first days of July.

After occupying the city, the Germans, supported by young Ukrainians, drove a group of Jews (Note: The victims were predominantly men, but there were also reports of Jewish women forced to work on the exhumation. See: Musiał (2001), p. 162.) to the Zolochiv castle, where they forced them to exhume the bodies of murdered prisoners. Captured Red Army soldiers were also forced to take part. During this work, both Jews and POWs were abused and killed. On July 4, the Germans carried out a mass execution of Jews in the castle. Only after two days, and not without difficulties, the riots were suppressed by the Wehrmacht. By then, hundreds of Zolochiv Jews had fallen victim to the pogrom. The Germans estimated the number of murdered Jews at approximately 300–500 people.

The massacre in Zolochiv prison also served as a pretext for the Nazis to carry out mass and more systematic executions of Jews. On July 10, the Feldgendarmerie shot approximately 300 members of the Jewish intelligentsia in the city.

== Bibliography ==
- Dynowski, Arkadiusz (1997). "Zbrodnicza ewakuacja więzień i aresztów NKWD w Busku, Czortkowie, Złoczowie, Stryju I Stanisławowie w czerwcu–lipcu 1941 r." [Criminal evacuation of NKVD prisons and detention centers in Busk, Chortkiv, Zolochiv, Stryi and Stanisławów in June–July, 1941]. In Mikoda, Janina (ed.). Zbrodnicza ewakuacja więzień i aresztów NKWD na Kresach Wschodnich II Rzeczypospolitej w czerwcu – lipcu 1941 roku. Materiały z sesji naukowej w 55. rocznicę ewakuacji więźniów NKWD w głąb ZSRR, Łódź 10 czerwca 1996 r. [Criminal evacuation of NKVD prisons and detention centers in the Eastern Borderlands of the Second Polish Republic in June-July 1941. Materials from the scientific session on the 55th anniversary of the evacuation of NKVD prisoners deep into the USSR, Łódź, June 10, 1996] (in Polish). Warszawa: Główna Komisja Badania Zbrodni przeciwko Narodowi Polskiemu – Instytut Pamięci Narodowej. ISBN 83-903356-6-2.
- Galiński, Antoni (1997). "Więzienia NKWD na Kresach Wschodnich II Rzeczypospolitej w latach 1939–1941 na podstawie dokumentacji Okręgowej Komisji Badania Zbrodni przeciwko Narodowi Polskiemu w Łodzi – Instytutu Pamięci Narodowej" [NKVD prisons in the Eastern Borderlands of the Second Polish Republic in 1939–1941 in the light of documents gathered by the District Commission for the Prosecution of Crimes against the Polish Nation in Łódź – Institute of National Remembrance]. In Mikoda, Janina (ed.). Zbrodnicza ewakuacja więzień i aresztów NKWD na Kresach Wschodnich II Rzeczypospolitej w czerwcu – lipcu 1941 roku. Materiały z sesji naukowej w 55. rocznicę ewakuacji więźniów NKWD w głąb ZSRR, Łódź 10 czerwca 1996 r. [Criminal evacuation of NKVD prisons and detention centers in the Eastern Borderlands of the Second Polish Republic in June-July 1941. Materials from the scientific session on the 55th anniversary of the evacuation of NKVD prisoners deep into the USSR, Łódź, June 10, 1996] (in Polish). Warszawa: Główna Komisja Badania Zbrodni przeciwko Narodowi Polskiemu – Instytut Pamięci Narodowej. ISBN 83-903356-6-2.
- Głowacki, Albin (1997). "Organizacja i funkcjonowanie więziennictwa NKWD na Kresach Wschodnich II Rzeczypospolitej w latach 1939–1941" [Organization and functioning of the NKVD prison system in the Eastern Borderlands of the Second Polish Republic in 1939–1941]. In Mikoda, Janina (ed.). Zbrodnicza ewakuacja więzień i aresztów NKWD na Kresach Wschodnich II Rzeczypospolitej w czerwcu – lipcu 1941 roku. Materiały z sesji naukowej w 55. rocznicę ewakuacji więźniów NKWD w głąb ZSRR, Łódź 10 czerwca 1996 r. [Criminal evacuation of NKVD prisons and detention centers in the Eastern Borderlands of the Second Polish Republic in June-July 1941. Materials from the scientific session on the 55th anniversary of the evacuation of NKVD prisoners deep into the USSR, Łódź, June 10, 1996] (in Polish). Warszawa: Główna Komisja Badania Zbrodni przeciwko Narodowi Polskiemu – Instytut Pamięci Narodowej. ISBN 83-903356-6-2.
- Motyka, Grzegorz (2006). Ukraińska partyzantka 1942–1960. Działalność Organizacji Ukraińskich Nacjonalistów i Ukraińskiej Powstańczej Armii [Ukrainian guerilla 1942–1960. Activities of the Organization of Ukrainian Nationalists and the Ukrainian Insurgent Army] (in Polish). Warszawa: Instytut Studiów Politycznych PAN i Oficyna Wydawnicza RYTM. ISBN 83-88490-58-3.
- Musiał, Bogdan (2001). Rozstrzelać elementy kontrrewolucyjne. Brutalizacja wojny niemiecko-sowieckiej latem 1941 roku [Shoot the counter-revolutionary elements. The brutalization of the German-Soviet war in the summer of 1941] (in Polish). Warszawa: Stowarzyszenie Kulturalne Fronda. ISBN 83-88747-40-1.
- Popiński, Krzysztof (1997). "Ewakuacja więzień kresowych w czerwcu 1941 r. na podstawie dokumentacji "Memoriału" i Archiwum Wschodniego" [Evacuation of Eastern Borderlands’ prisons in June 1941 in the light of documents gathered by the "Memorial" and the Eastern Archive]. In Mikoda, Janina (ed.). Zbrodnicza ewakuacja więzień i aresztów NKWD na Kresach Wschodnich II Rzeczypospolitej w czerwcu – lipcu 1941 roku. Materiały z sesji naukowej w 55. rocznicę ewakuacji więźniów NKWD w głąb ZSRR, Łódź 10 czerwca 1996 r. [Criminal evacuation of NKVD prisons and detention centers in the Eastern Borderlands of the Second Polish Republic in June-July 1941. Materials from the scientific session on the 55th anniversary of the evacuation of NKVD prisoners deep into the USSR, Łódź, June 10, 1996] (in Polish). Warszawa: Główna Komisja Badania Zbrodni przeciwko Narodowi Polskiemu – Instytut Pamięci Narodowej. ISBN 83-903356-6-2.
- Popiński, Krzysztof; Kokurin, Aleksandr; Gurjanow, Aleksandr (1995). Drogi śmierci. Ewakuacja więzień sowieckich z Kresów Wschodnich II Rzeczypospolitej w czerwcu i lipcu 1941 [Roads of death. Evacuation of Soviet prisons from the Eastern Borderlands of the Second Polish Republic in June and July 1941] (in Polish). Warszawa: Wydawnictwo "Karta". ISBN 83-900676-9-2.
- Węgierski, Jerzy (1991). Lwów pod okupacją sowiecką 1939–1941 [Lviv under Soviet occupation 1939–1941] (in Polish). Warszawa: Editions Spotkania. ISBN 83-85195-15-7.
