= Evacuation of Chortkiv Prison =

- Part of occupation of Poland (1939–1945)
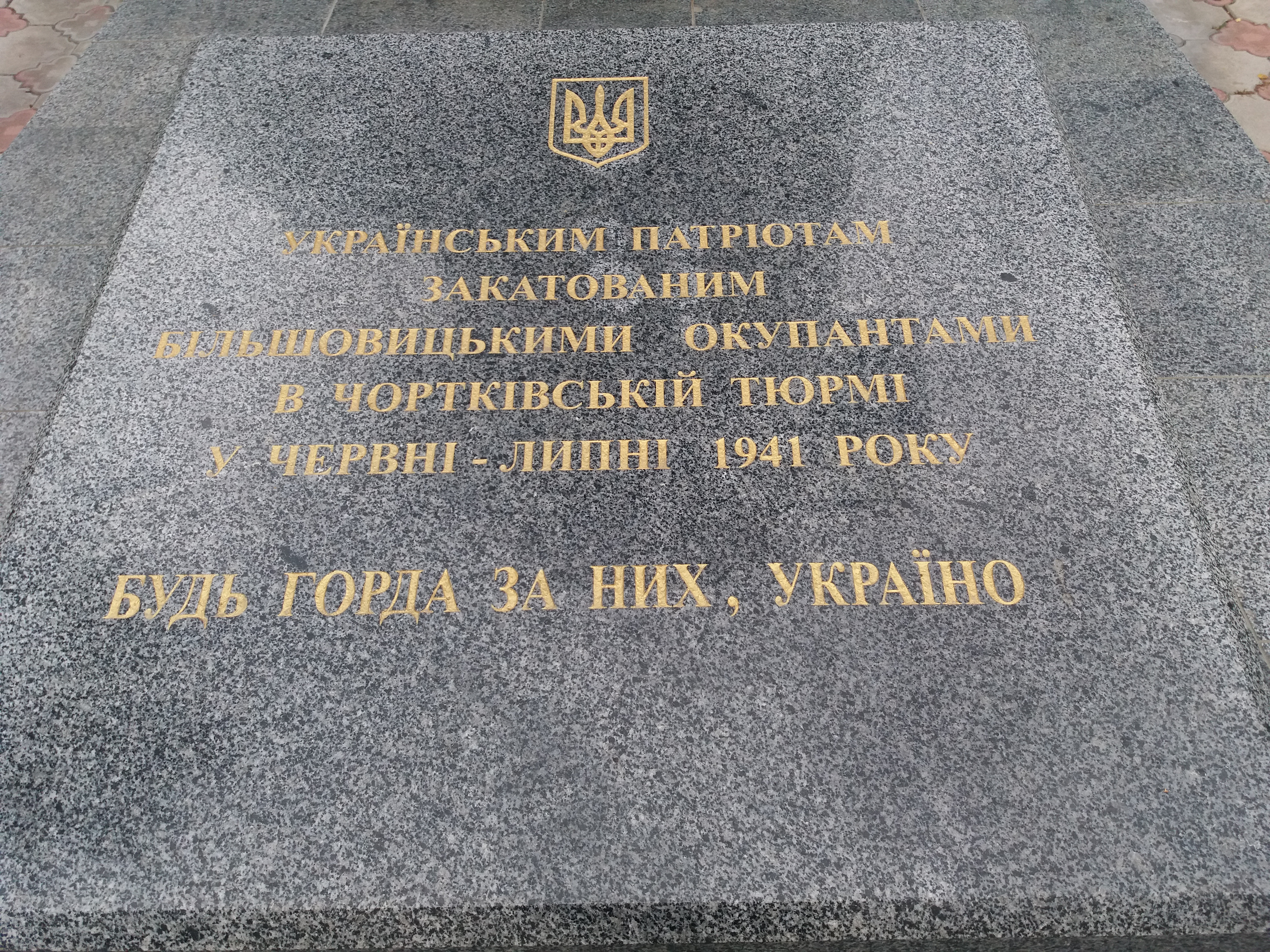
- Plaque at Stepan Bandera Street in Chortkiv commemorating victims of the prison massacre
- Location: 49°01′06″N 25°47′32″E; Chortkiv, Eastern Poland/Western Ukraine
- Date: June–July, 1941
- Target: Prisoners, mostly Ukrainians and Poles
- Attack type: mass murder
- Deaths: at least 890
- Perpetrator: NKVD

The Evacuation of Chortkiv Prison refers to the compelled evacuation and massacre of inmates from the prison in the city of Chortkiv, then in occupied Poland and now in Ukraine. In the last days of June 1941, following the German invasion of the USSR, the Soviets executed an estimated 100 to 200 prisoners held in the Chortkiv prison. The remaining prisoners were evacuated further east, either by train or on foot, while hundreds died due to the inhumane conditions of transport or at the hands of guards. According to Soviet documents, the overall number of victims was estimated at 890, while other sources suggest it might exceed 1,000. This atrocity was one of several prisoner massacres carried out by the Soviet secret police and army during the summer of 1941.

== Background ==
During the interwar period, Chortkiv (Ukrainian: Чортків, Polish: Czortków) was located within the borders of the Second Polish Republic and served as the center of the Chortkiv county in Tarnopol Voivodeship. After the German-Soviet invasion of Poland in 1939, the city fell under Soviet occupation. On January 21, 1940, local Polish conspirators, mostly youths aged 16–20, organized an unsuccessful uprising against the Soviets. According to Soviet reports, at least 24 captured insurgents were executed, while 55 others were deported to the Gulag camps.

Those apprehended by the NKVD were confined in the cells of a pre-war Polish prison situated on Adama Mickiewicza Street (present-day Stepan Bandera Street), in close proximity to the pre-war magistrates’ court building. The prison in Chortkiv was one of four Soviet prisons operating in Ternopil Oblast. It was referred to as 'Prison No. 2' in Soviet official documents. An NKVD functionary named Levchuk served as a prison warden.

On June 22, 1941, Nazi Germany invaded the Soviet Union. Due to the swift progress of the German offensive, the NKVD began exterminating political prisoners in the war zone. In the summer of 1941, in the part of Poland occupied by the USSR, an estimated 20,000 to 30,000 individuals were murdered in prisons and detention centers.

== The course of events ==
=== Massacre in prison ===
According to documents from Soviet archives, as of June 10, 1941, the prison in Chortkiv held 1292 inmates. The "List of departures and movements of transports from NKVD prisons of the Ukrainian SSR" informs that "until the evacuation, there were 1,300 inmates in the prison". This information is also found in a July 12, 1941 report by Captain of State Security Andrei Filippov, regarding the evacuation of prisons in the western districts of the Ukrainian SSR. (Note: These are not the only mentions of the evacuation of Chortkiv prison found in the NKVD archives. A July 31, 1941 report by the deputy head of the prison board of the NKVD of the Ukrainian SSR, politruk Demyekhin, concerning the evacuation of inmates from prisons in Chortkiv and Kolomyia, states that when the evacuation began, there were 954 inmates in the prison in Chortkiv. However, this report only describes the fate of those prisoners who were rushed to Uman on foot. See: Popiński, Kokurin i Gurjanow (1995), pp. 89–90.)

After the outbreak of the German-Soviet war, over a thousand prisoners were evacuated from Chortkiv by the NKVD. However, the Soviets decided to murder some of the political prisoners on the spot. First of all, they executed those individuals to whom, before the war, the death penalty or long prison sentences were awarded under Article 58 of the USSR Penal Code and Article 54 of the Penal Code of the Ukrainian SSR.

At the beginning of July 1941, after the German troops entered Chortkiv, the inhabitants went to the prison at Mickiewicza Street. Initially, the building seemed completely deserted. However, soon the bodies of murdered prisoners were found in its basements, and in the inner courtyard, a mass grave was discovered, concealed beneath freshly planted flower beds. Many of the discovered corpses showed signs of torture. (Note: The testimony and accounts of witnesses involved in the exhumation of the victims of the NKVD prisoner massacres repeatedly mention bodies bearing signs of severe torture. However, according to Bogdan Musiał, injuries initially thought to be signs of torture were likely a result of rapid decomposition of the corpses, accelerated by the summer heat, as well as scavengers and unskilled handling during exhumation (see: Musiał (2001), pp. 236–237). At times, executions were hastily carried out using grenades and machine guns, resulting in severe injuries to the victims (see: Musiał (2001), p. 236). Also, he believes that in Eastern Galicia and Volhynia, there were cases where, after the departure of the Soviets, the bodies of NKVD victims were purposely mutilated by Ukrainian nationalists seeking to depict dramatic examples of their nation's martyrdom for propaganda purposes (see: Musiał (2001), pp. 237–240).) Witnesses also claimed that, in one of the cells, guards walled up prisoners alive; several living people and about 100 bodies were allegedly found there (however, Bogdan Musiał questions the veracity of such reports). (Note: According to Bogdan Musiał, information about prisoners being walled alive, which is repeated in the accounts of many witnesses of the NKVD prisoner massacres, most probably had its source in rumors or was the result of a misinterpretation of facts. In his opinion, only the bodies of previously shot prisoners were bricked up in the cells. See: Musiał (2001), p. 240.)

On July 9, 1941, German soldier Meinrad von Ow recalled:

We arrived at a large prison in a small town at 5:00 AM, where we encountered some horrifying scenes. The bodies of the murdered were scattered everywhere: some half-buried, some near the wall where they were shot, and some horribly mutilated. Most of them were people killed in recent days, but many of them lost their lives before June 22.

Determining the exact number of prisoners who were murdered directly within the prison remains challenging. The NKVD reports provide no information about executions in Chortkiv itself. Eyewitnesses reported that several hundred bodies were found in the prison. The District Commission for the Prosecution of Crimes against the Polish Nation in Łódź, which investigated this crime in the 1990s, estimated that between 100 and 200 prisoners were murdered in the building on Mickiewicza Street.

The prison massacre was not the only crime committed by the Soviets in Chortkiv in the summer of 1941. Before leaving the city, NKVD men committed numerous rapes and robberies against the civilian population. Additionally, on the night of July 1–2, 1941, they killed seven Dominican friars and one tertiary from Saint Stanislaus Church.

=== Evacuation by train ===
From 350 to 500 (Note: Both the "List of departures and movements of transports from NKVD prisons of the Ukrainian SSR", and Andrei Filippov’s report inform that 500 prisoners were evacuated by train. The former document also states that "470 prisoners arrived in Gorky on July 16, 1941, as part of the Kyiv transport. See: Popiński, Kokurin i Gurjanow (1995), pp. 97, 101.) prisoners were sent by train to the city of Gorki (present-day Nizhny Novgorod). The journey in sealed and uncleaned cattle wagons lasted 17 days. The prisoners were not provided with water, only minimal rations of food. As a result, heat, thirst, and exhaustion resulted in numerous deaths. Due to the fact that the wagons were emptied every few days, the prisoners had to travel with the bodies of their deceased comrades, which quickly decomposed in the summer heat.

B. H. Łoziński, a Polish prisoner who survived the train transport, recalled:

We travelled for the second day without any meals or water, and the heat was terrible, the tightness and stuffiness led to extreme despair and cries for help. Finally, at some station, already in Soviet Ukraine, the train stopped, and NKVD soldiers started carrying buckets full of heavily salted fish into the carriages. Everyone rushed for this food. Unfortunately, they did not provide water, and the train continued its journey. And then the real tragedy began. The thirst, intensified by the salty fish, led to madness. Incredible screams and moans of the dying came from dry throats and bloody foam at the mouth. A true picture of 'Dante's Inferno'... When I woke up from this lethargy, and consciousness returned, I found... that about 30% of the prisoners died in tragic conditions.

Polish investigators estimated that at least 63 prisoners died during transport by train. Witness quoted by Jerzy Węgierski claimed that 34 people died in one wagon alone.

=== Death march to Uman ===
From 700 to 800 or even 954 prisoners were kept in prison almost until the last moment. According to Andrei Filippov's report:

A sufficient number of wagons were provided to evacuate all the prisoners, but the head of the local NKGB post ordered that 800 prisoners under investigation or convicted of counter-revolutionary crimes be left in prison. [...] At the last moment, he renounced these 800 prisoners and told the prison warden, "Do with them whatever you want."

Finally, these prisoners were rushed east on foot. The route of the march led through Kamianets-Podilskyi, Zhmerynka, Tyvriv, Sytkivtsi, and Khrystynivka. Soviet reports state that "on the way, in an attempt to rebel and escape," 123 prisoners (allegedly members of the Organization of Ukrainian Nationalists) were shot.

After a dozen or so days, the column reached Uman. On July 20, 1941, the Deputy People's Commissar of State Security of the Ukrainian SSR, Major of State Security Ivan M. Tkachenko, along with an unnamed military prosecutor, decided to execute all prisoners who had been "convicted or were under investigation for counter-revolutionary crimes". Consequently, according to Soviet reports, 767 individuals were executed in Uman.

Only 64 criminal prisoners survived. Some of them were immediately released, while 31 prisoners of Polish nationality were temporarily left in the prison in Uman.

== Aftermath ==
The NKVD reports stated that a total of 890 prisoners were murdered during the liquidation of the Chortkiv prison. However, surviving prisoners and witnesses of the exhumation estimated that the number of victims was in the hundreds.

As in other instances of prison massacres, the local Jewish community got blamed for the actions of the NKVD. As per the antisemitic canard of Jewish Bolshevism, Jews were perceived as synonymous with the Soviet regime and its policies of terror. After German troops entered Chortkiv, local Jews were forced to work on the exhumation of bodies found in the prison. During this work, they were beaten, humiliated, and murdered by soldiers.

The funeral ceremony for the victims of the prison massacre took place on July 9, 1941, with the bodies buried in a mass grave at the municipal cemetery in Chortkiv.

During an investigation conducted in Poland in the 1990s, it was established that executions in the Chortkiv prison involved, among others, two communist functionaries of Jewish origin who were natives of Chortkiv. They served as employees of the Soviet occupation apparatus. After the end of the war, both individuals went on to serve in the ranks of the Polish People's Army, attaining high officer ranks.

== Bibliography ==
- Dynowski, Arkadiusz (1997). "Zbrodnicza ewakuacja więzień i aresztów NKWD w Busku, Czortkowie, Złoczowie, Stryju i Stanisławowie w czerwcu–lipcu 1941 r." [Criminal evacuation of NKVD prisons and detention centers in Busk, Chortkiv, Zolochiv, Stryi and Stanisławów in June–July, 1941]. In Mikoda, Janina (ed.). Zbrodnicza ewakuacja więzień i aresztów NKWD na Kresach Wschodnich II Rzeczypospolitej w czerwcu – lipcu 1941 roku. Materiały z sesji naukowej w 55. rocznicę ewakuacji więźniów NKWD w głąb ZSRR, Łódź 10 czerwca 1996 r. [Criminal evacuation of NKVD prisons and detention centers in the Eastern Borderlands of the Second Polish Republic in June–July 1941. Materials from the scientific session on the 55th anniversary of the evacuation of NKVD prisoners deep into the USSR, Łódź, June 10, 1996] (in Polish). Warszawa: Główna Komisja Badania Zbrodni przeciwko Narodowi Polskiemu – Instytut Pamięci Narodowej. ISBN 83-903356-6-2.
- Galiński, Antoni (1997). "Więzienia NKWD na Kresach Wschodnich II Rzeczypospolitej w latach 1939–1941 na podstawie dokumentacji Okręgowej Komisji Badania Zbrodni przeciwko Narodowi Polskiemu w Łodzi – Instytutu Pamięci Narodowej" [NKVD prisons in the Eastern Borderlands of the Second Polish Republic in 1939–1941 in the light of documents gathered by the District Commission for the Prosecution of Crimes against the Polish Nation in Łódź – Institute of National Remembrance]. In Mikoda, Janina (ed.). Zbrodnicza ewakuacja więzień i aresztów NKWD na Kresach Wschodnich II Rzeczypospolitej w czerwcu – lipcu 1941 roku. Materiały z sesji naukowej w 55. rocznicę ewakuacji więźniów NKWD w głąb ZSRR, Łódź 10 czerwca 1996 r. [Criminal evacuation of NKVD prisons and detention centers in the Eastern Borderlands of the Second Polish Republic in June–July 1941. Materials from the scientific session on the 55th anniversary of the evacuation of NKVD prisoners deep into the USSR, Łódź, June 10, 1996] (in Polish). Warszawa: Główna Komisja Badania Zbrodni przeciwko Narodowi Polskiemu – Instytut Pamięci Narodowej. ISBN 83-903356-6-2.
- Głowacki, Albin (1997). "Organizacja i funkcjonowanie więziennictwa NKWD na Kresach Wschodnich II Rzeczypospolitej w latach 1939–1941" [Organization and functioning of the NKVD prison system in the Eastern Borderlands of the Second Polish Republic in 1939–1941]. In Mikoda, Janina (ed.). Zbrodnicza ewakuacja więzień i aresztów NKWD na Kresach Wschodnich II Rzeczypospolitej w czerwcu – lipcu 1941 roku. Materiały z sesji naukowej w 55. rocznicę ewakuacji więźniów NKWD w głąb ZSRR, Łódź 10 czerwca 1996 r. [Criminal evacuation of NKVD prisons and detention centers in the Eastern Borderlands of the Second Polish Republic in June–July 1941. Materials from the scientific session on the 55th anniversary of the evacuation of NKVD prisoners deep into the USSR, Łódź, June 10, 1996] (in Polish). Warszawa: Główna Komisja Badania Zbrodni przeciwko Narodowi Polskiemu – Instytut Pamięci Narodowej. ISBN 83-903356-6-2.
- Musiał, Bogdan (2001). Rozstrzelać elementy kontrrewolucyjne. Brutalizacja wojny niemiecko-sowieckiej latem 1941 roku [Shoot the counter-revolutionary elements. The brutalization of the German-Soviet war in the summer of 1941] (in Polish). Warszawa: Stowarzyszenie Kulturalne Fronda. ISBN 83-88747-40-1.
- Popiński, Krzysztof (1997). "Ewakuacja więzień kresowych w czerwcu 1941 r. na podstawie dokumentacji "Memoriału" i Archiwum Wschodniego" [Evacuation of Eastern Borderlands’ prisons in June 1941 in the light of documents gathered by the "Memorial" and the Eastern Archive]. In Mikoda, Janina (ed.). Zbrodnicza ewakuacja więzień i aresztów NKWD na Kresach Wschodnich II Rzeczypospolitej w czerwcu – lipcu 1941 roku. Materiały z sesji naukowej w 55. rocznicę ewakuacji więźniów NKWD w głąb ZSRR, Łódź 10 czerwca 1996 r. [Criminal evacuation of NKVD prisons and detention centers in the Eastern Borderlands of the Second Polish Republic in June–July 1941. Materials from the scientific session on the 55th anniversary of the evacuation of NKVD prisoners deep into the USSR, Łódź, June 10, 1996] (in Polish). Warszawa: Główna Komisja Badania Zbrodni przeciwko Narodowi Polskiemu – Instytut Pamięci Narodowej. ISBN 83-903356-6-2.
- Popiński, Krzysztof; Kokurin, Aleksandr; Gurjanow, Aleksandr (1995). Drogi śmierci. Ewakuacja więzień sowieckich z Kresów Wschodnich II Rzeczypospolitej w czerwcu i lipcu 1941 [Roads of death. Evacuation of Soviet prisons from the Eastern Borderlands of the Second Polish Republic in June and July 1941] (in Polish). Warszawa: Wydawnictwo "Karta". ISBN 83-900676-9-2.
- Węgierski, Jerzy (1991). Lwów pod okupacją sowiecką 1939–1941 [Lviv under Soviet occupation 1939–1941] (in Polish). Warszawa: Editions Spotkania. ISBN 83-85195-15-7.
- Zechenter, Anna (2017). "Powstanie w Czortkowie" [Chortkiv Uprising]. Biuletyn IPN (in Polish). 11 (144). ISSN 1641-9561.
