= NKVD prisoner massacre in Lutsk =

1941 massacre of prisoners by Soviet NKVD

- Part of the aftermath of the Soviet invasion of Poland (during World War II) and Soviet repressions of Polish citizens (1939–1946)
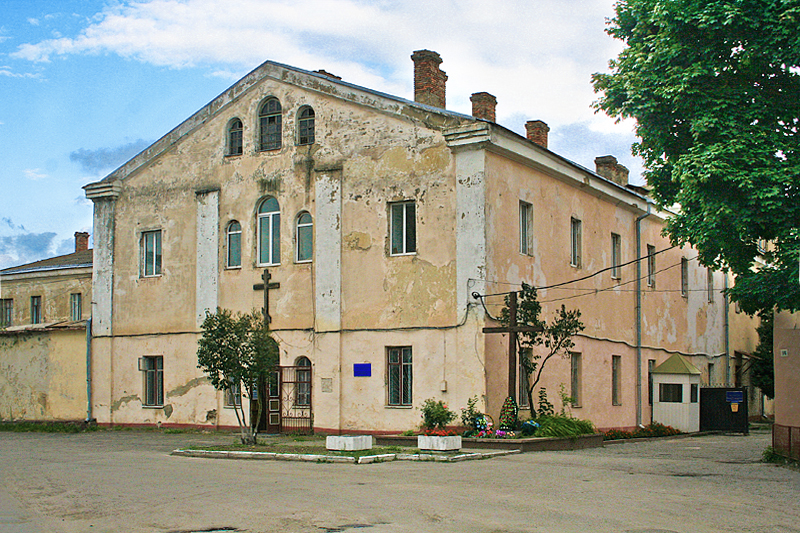
- The former prison in Lutsk
- Location: 50°44′14″N 25°19′21″E; Lutsk, Eastern Poland/Western Ukraine
- Date: June 23, 1941
- Target: Prisoners, mostly Ukrainians and Poles
- Attack type: Mass murder
- Deaths: Around 2,000
- Perpetrators: NKVD, NKGB

The NKVD prisoner massacre in Lutsk was a Soviet war crime conducted by the NKVD and NKGB in the city of Lutsk, situated in occupied Poland (present-day Ukraine). On June 23, 1941, during the second day of the German invasion of the USSR, the Soviets executed a vast majority of the prisoners held in the Lutsk prison, predominantly Ukrainians and Poles. The estimated number of victims is believed to be around 2,000, although there are varying estimates from different sources. This atrocity was one among many prisoner massacres carried out by the Soviet secret police and army during the summer of 1941.

== Background ==
Lutsk (Ukrainian: Луцьк, Polish: Łuck) served as the historical capital of Volhynia. During the Interwar period, the city was situated within the borders of the Second Polish Republic and was designated as the capital of Wołyń Voivodeship. Following the German-Soviet invasion of Poland in 1939, Lutsk, along with the rest of Volhynia, came under Soviet occupation.

Those apprehended by the NKVD were confined in the cells of a pre-war Polish prison, situated in the building of the former convent of the Brigidine Sisters on Brygidek Street (present-day Kafedralna Street). The property housing the prison was relatively expansive, bordering the banks of the Styr River on one side and Cathedral Square on the other. With the onset of the occupation, the prison underwent expansions, including the addition of a surrounding wall, creating two internal courtyards separated by the main building of the former monastery.

The prison in Lutsk was one of three Soviet prisons operating in the Volyn Oblast. It was referred to as 'Prison No. 1' in Soviet official documents. Junior Lieutenant of State Security, Griniev, served as the prison warden. Predominantly, individuals apprehended in the Lutsk and Horokhiv counties were confined in this facility. According to documents from Soviet archives, as of June 10, 1941, the prison held 2,055 inmates. Additional NKVD records from June 1941, concerning the planned evacuation of the prison, indicated an intended evacuation of either 1,999 or 2,052 prisoners. At that time, approximately 70% of the prisoners were Ukrainian, while 25% were of Polish nationality, with the remaining individuals representing other nationalities.

On June 22, 1941, Nazi Germany initiated an invasion of the Soviet Union. Owing to the swift progression of the German offensive, the NKVD began the process of exterminating political prisoners held within the war zone. In the summer of 1941, within the part of Poland occupied by the USSR, an estimated 20,000 to 30,000 individuals in prisons and detention centers were murdered.

== The massacre ==
=== Prelude ===
Initially, as per pre-war plans, the Soviets aimed to evacuate nearly all prisoners from Lutsk to prisons situated deep within Soviet territory. A plan endorsed on June 23, 1941, by Vasily Chernyshov, the Deputy People's Commissar of Internal Affairs of the Ukrainian SSR, outlined the transfer of 919 prisoners to Vladimir and another 1,080 to prisons in the Stalingrad Oblast. However, due to the rapid advancement of the Wehrmacht and logistical limitations, executing this plan became unfeasible.

Simultaneously, Lutsk and Volhynia lay in the primary path of Army Group South's offensive. On the war's first day, Luftwaffe air raids struck the city, causing destruction to the prison area. German bombs damaged the administration building (or guardhouse, as per alternative sources), the outer wall, and a quoin of the main prison building. Fatalities included the head of the prison's economic department, Bondarenko, his wife, and one guard, with two other guards sustaining injuries. (Note: Other sources indicate that, besides Bondarenko and his wife, three guards lost their lives during the raid. See: Criminal evacuation (1997), p. 117.) Amid the chaos, some inmates attempted escape, met with resistance from guards using machine gun fire. Several prisoners were shot, while others were intercepted in the prison yard and herded back to their cells the following day at 9:00 AM.

In a June 28, 1941 report by Captain of State Security Andrei Filippov, head of the prison board of the NKVD of the Ukrainian SSR, it was stated that following the German air raid, prisoners allegedly attempted a revolt, purportedly “breaking the doors of cells and prison warehouses where axes, razors and other sharp tools were stored”. However, surviving prisoners' testimonies did not corroborate this information. Bogdan Musiał believes that the information about purported rebellion was contrived to justify the subsequent arbitrary liquidation of inmates, which took place the next day. (Note: It wasn't until June 24, 1941, that the chief of the NKVD, Lavrentiy Beria, issued an order to execute all political prisoners detained in the western regions of the USSR, for whom evacuation was unfeasible. Consequently, the massacre in Lutsk was entirely arbitrary. See: Musiał (2001), p. 92, 108.)

Additionally, Filippov's report acknowledged that post the alleged suppression of the "rebellion," 73 prisoners previously sentenced to death before the war outbreak were executed.

=== Massacre at the courtyards ===
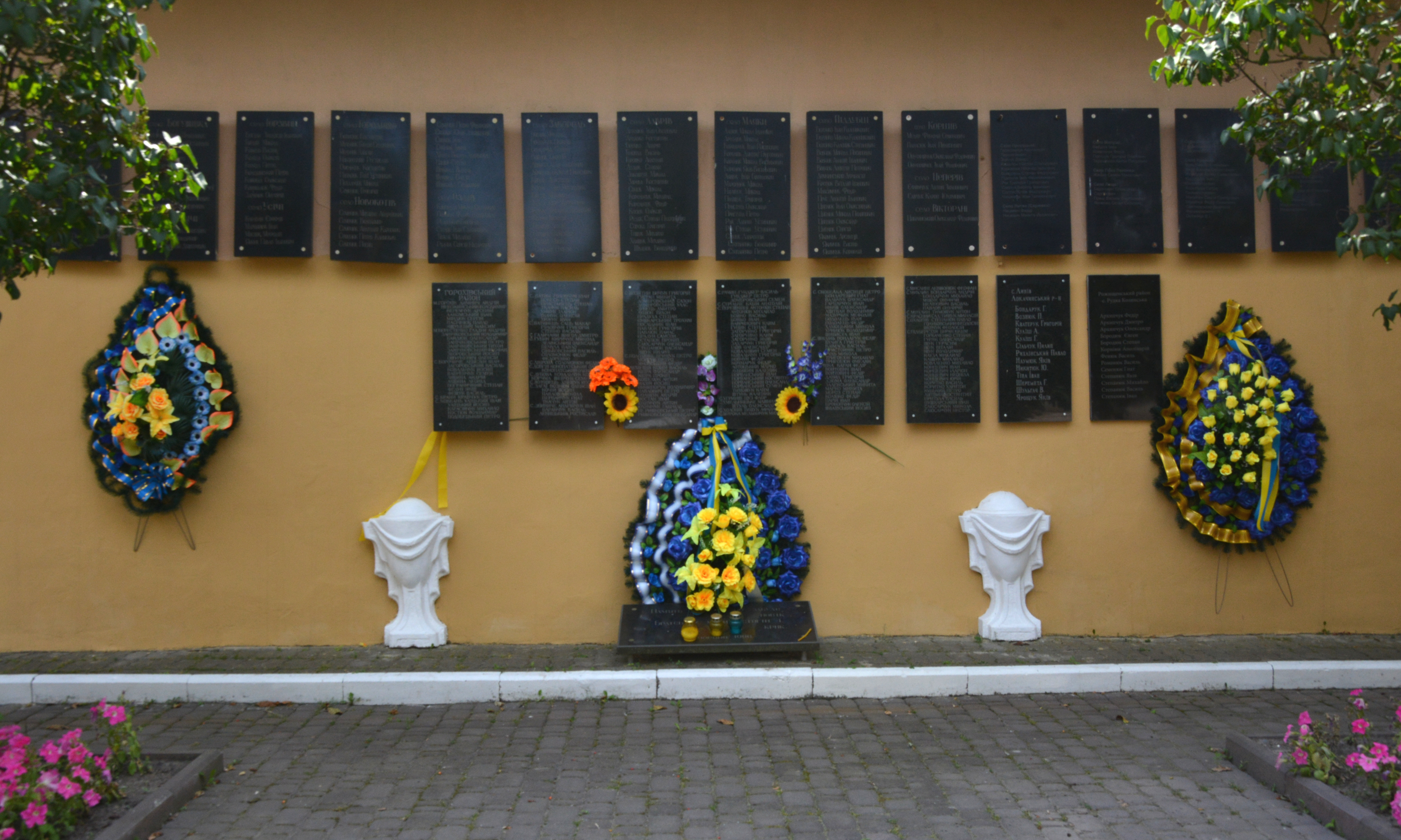
Lutsk, Kafedralna Street. Plaques with the names of the victims of the NKVD prisoner massacre

According to the report compiled by Sergeant of State Security Stan, head of the prison branch of the NKVD of the Volyn Oblast, on June 23 at 11:30 AM, an operational group led by Captain of State Security Rozov, composed of NKGB and NKVD officers from the Volyn Oblast, arrived at the prison. Stan claimed that Rozov and the head of the local NKGB branch, Captain of State Security Ivan Belocerkovsky, instructed him to hand over, within 20 minutes, all prisoners detained under Article 54, points 2 and 11 of the Criminal Code of the Ukrainian SSR, specifically including members of the Organization of Ukrainian Nationalists. Allegedly, the decision for immediate execution was influenced by erroneous reports suggesting that German troops were within 7 kilometers of Lutsk.

Around noon, guards instructed prisoners to vacate their cells with their belongings, implying imminent release due to the war's outbreak. Prisoners were assembled in the yard and divided into two groups. Ukrainian prisoners (approximately 1,500 people) were taken to a courtyard near the Styr River bank, while Poles (around 500 people) remained in the yard. Simultaneously, guards singled out several dozen individuals from the crowd, calling them by name. Marian Krasuski, a survivor, claimed that about 50-80 people were "selected" in this manner. Conversely, Andrei Filippov's report stated that among those selected were 14 individuals sentenced under the decree of the Presidium of the Supreme Soviet of June 26, 1940, (Note: Under this decree, individuals accused of leaving their workplace were primarily detained. See: Popiński, Kokurin i Gurjanow (1995), p. 75.) 30 individuals convicted of criminal offenses, and 40 minors—totaling 84 prisoners. Minors were returned to their cells, while the remaining 44 selected prisoners were immediately released.

Once the Ukrainian prisoners were gathered in the courtyard, they were ordered into rows. Upon compliance, Soviets revealed machine guns positioned in front of the prisoners, opening fire and hurling grenades into the crowd. Victims were also shot from prison building windows. The wounded were fatally dealt with. Soon after, NKVD and NKGB personnel similarly massacred Polish prisoners, shooting them from walls, guard towers, and upper floors of the prison. The massacre lasted approximately an hour. Following its conclusion, surviving prisoners were instructed to return to their cells. At the entrance, any injured or even blood-covered survivors were stopped and killed. Several dozen prisoners survived in the "Polish" courtyard—witnesses estimated their numbers at 50–60, 80–90, or even 120 people. Significantly fewer prisoners survived the massacre in the "Ukrainian" courtyard, with only 11 standing up when called by NKVD men. One of the Ukrainians, who was wounded, was immediately killed.

In his report, Sergeant Stan claimed that the execution was carried out by members of the Rozov operational group, prison management, guards, and soldiers from the NKVD Convoy Troops company under the command of Senior Lieutenant Fakhrudinov. Conversely, Andrei Filippov's report stated that "the head of the second UNKGB board Goncharov, UNKGB officer Dworkin, and the head of the UNKVD prison board Stan, with the participation of other NKGB and NKVD officers," were responsible for the shooting of the prisoners. Surviving prisoners asserted that, alongside Soviet personnel, two Jewish women from Lutsk—Blumenkranz, approximately twenty years old (daughter of a shoe store owner), and a Spiegel—took part in the execution.

=== Further killings and the Soviet attempts to cover up the massacre ===
Following the conclusion of the massacre, the Soviets realized that reports of the Germans' swift advancement were exaggerated. (Note: During this time, German troops were approximately 25 kilometers away from Lutsk. See: Solonin (2015), p. 336.) Consequently, efforts were made to conceal evidence of the massacre. On June 24, surviving prisoners were coerced by the NKVD to bury the bodies of their slain fellow inmates. Victims from the "Ukrainian" courtyard were disposed of in a bomb crater, while those from the "Polish" courtyard were hastily buried within the prison premises. Lime was applied over the bodies and blood-stained areas on the walls and courtyards. Luggage, clothing remnants, and smaller body parts were gathered, ignited in a heap, while prison documentation and valuables were transported to Kyiv by the deputy prison warden, Leskin. (Note: Leading up to the German invasion, Leskin had been notably harsh towards prisoners (see: Criminal evacuation (1997), p. 117). However, on the day of the massacre, according to Stan, he “cowardly hid' outside the prison grounds (see: Solonin (2015), p. 336.).)

Simultaneously, the Soviets continued executing prisoners. Throughout the afternoon of June 23 and the night of June 23–24, they removed individual prisoners and groups of 15-20 individuals from their cells, subsequently executing them in the "Ukrainian" courtyard. The total count of victims ranged from several dozen to around a hundred prisoners, which also included three women. Considering the number of victims, it's plausible that among them were individuals who initially ignored guards' calls and hid in their cells on the morning of June 23.

=== Victims and survivors ===
Eyewitness accounts provided widely varying estimations regarding the number of victims in the massacre, ranging from 1,000 to 4,500 individuals. German sources suggested figures between 1,500 and 2,800 murdered prisoners. The latter number is also indicated in some Ukrainian sources. Even Soviet documents presented conflicting data. Sergeant of State Security Stan's report mentioned the liquidation of around a thousand prisoners, allegedly predominantly convicted of criminal offenses, while asserting that roughly another thousand remained alive in their cells. (Note: According to Stan's account, the group of around a thousand victims included: over 70 individuals previously sentenced to death and executed immediately after the war outbreak, an unspecified number shot on June 22 while attempting to escape, and approximately 800 shot on June 23 in the prison courtyards. See: Solonin (2015), p. 336–337.) Andrei Filippov's report indicated the shooting of two thousand individuals, a number also mirrored in the "List of departures and movements of transports from NKVD prisons of the Ukrainian SSR". This last estimation is probably most accurate.

Among the victims, besides Ukrainians and Poles, were representatives of various nationalities, including ten German POWs captured by the Soviets and subsequently executed.

The precise count of survivors remains elusive. Władysław Siemaszko approximated slightly over 90 survivors. Investigations by the District Commission for the Prosecution of Crimes against the Polish Nation in Łódź revealed the names of 225 victims and 32 survivors. Additionally, in 1990–1991 a Ukrainian newspaper published the names of 140 individuals who were murdered in Lutsk prison in June 1941.

Władysław Bukowiński and Władysław Siemaszko were among those who survived the massacre.

== Aftermath ==
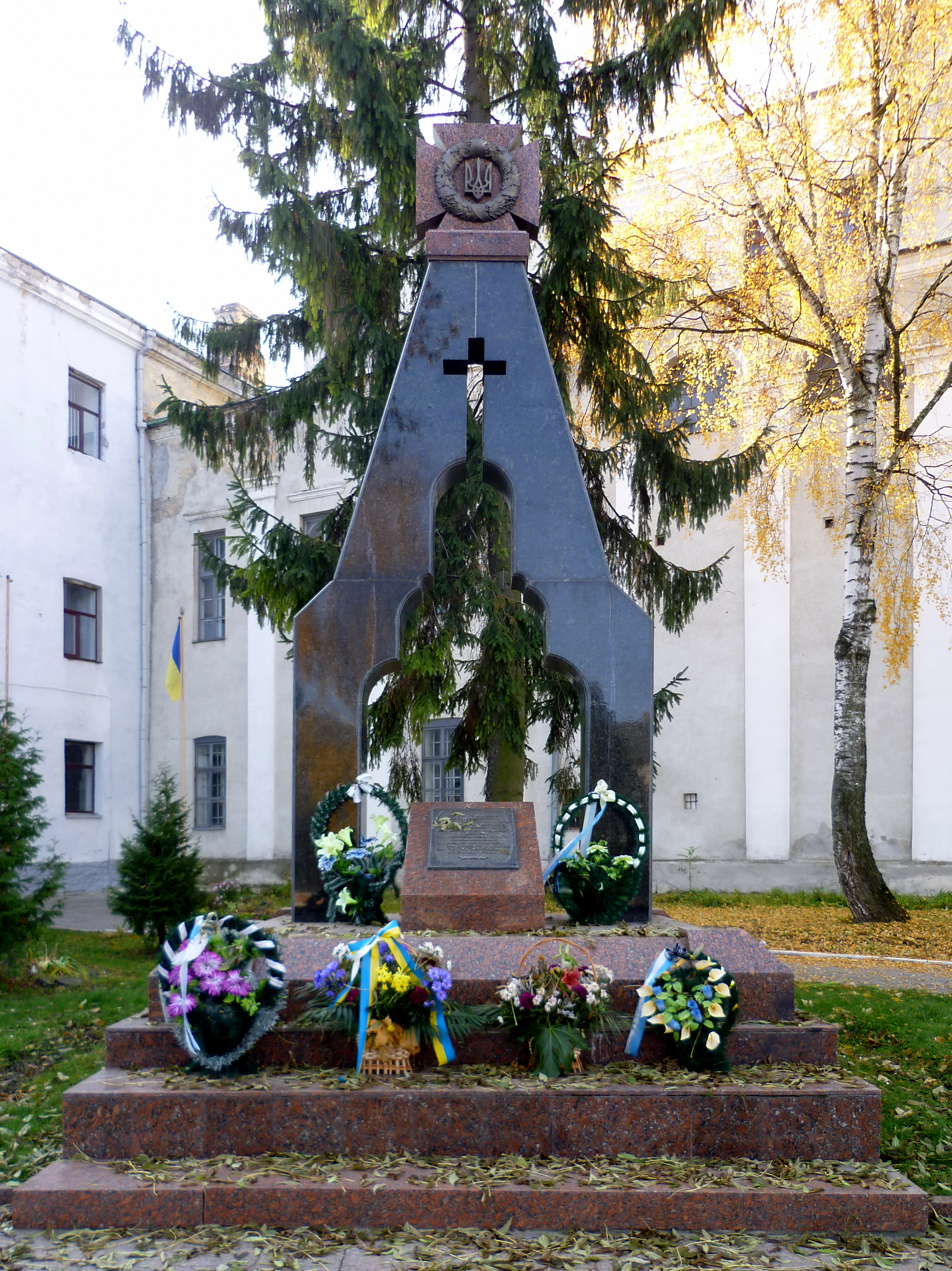
The monument at Kafedralna Street in Lutsk commemorating victims of the massacre

Ultimately, the NKVD had aimed to eradicate all prisoners, but the entry of German troops into Lutsk on June 25, 1941, prevented this. Surviving prisoners recalled immense relief, with even some Poles shouting "Heil Hitler" upon seeing the Wehrmacht soldiers. However, upon taking control of the prison, the Germans singled out individuals suspected of Jewish origin from the group of survivors. Additionally, they executed a Soviet prosecutor (Note: According to Władysław Siemaszko, this individual was among the officials overseeing the prisoners' extermination. See: Criminal evacuation (1997), p. 69.) and a few NKVD personnel captured within the prison's confines.

The ceremonial funeral for the massacre victims occurred on the final Sunday of August 1941. With German approval, Ukrainian residents of Lutsk constructed mounds atop four mass graves, marking them with plaques and oak crosses.

The Lutsk prison massacre was exploited by Nazi propaganda. On June 26, a German film crew captured footage of the crime scene. Subsequently, on July 7, the "Völkischer Beobachter" published an article titled: "1,500 Ukrainians massacred by machine gun fire in Lutsk. New GPU mass murder has been discovered."

The day after the Germans took control of Lutsk, Ukrainian residents instigated a pogrom in which several Jews were killed and many others were wounded.

Also, the prison massacre served as justification for mass executions of Jews by the Nazis. On June 27, Einsatzgruppe C entered the city and its members promptly murdered several hundred Jews. In response to the revelation of Soviet massacres, particularly the deaths of German POWs, Field Marshal Walter von Reichenau ordered the execution of "as many Jews as Ukrainians previously killed". In compliance, EG C members, assisted by Wehrmacht soldiers and Ukrainian militiamen, shot 1,160 Jews in Lutsk. According to alternative sources, the number of Jews murdered in the city in late June and early July 1941 could have reached two thousand.

== Remembrance ==
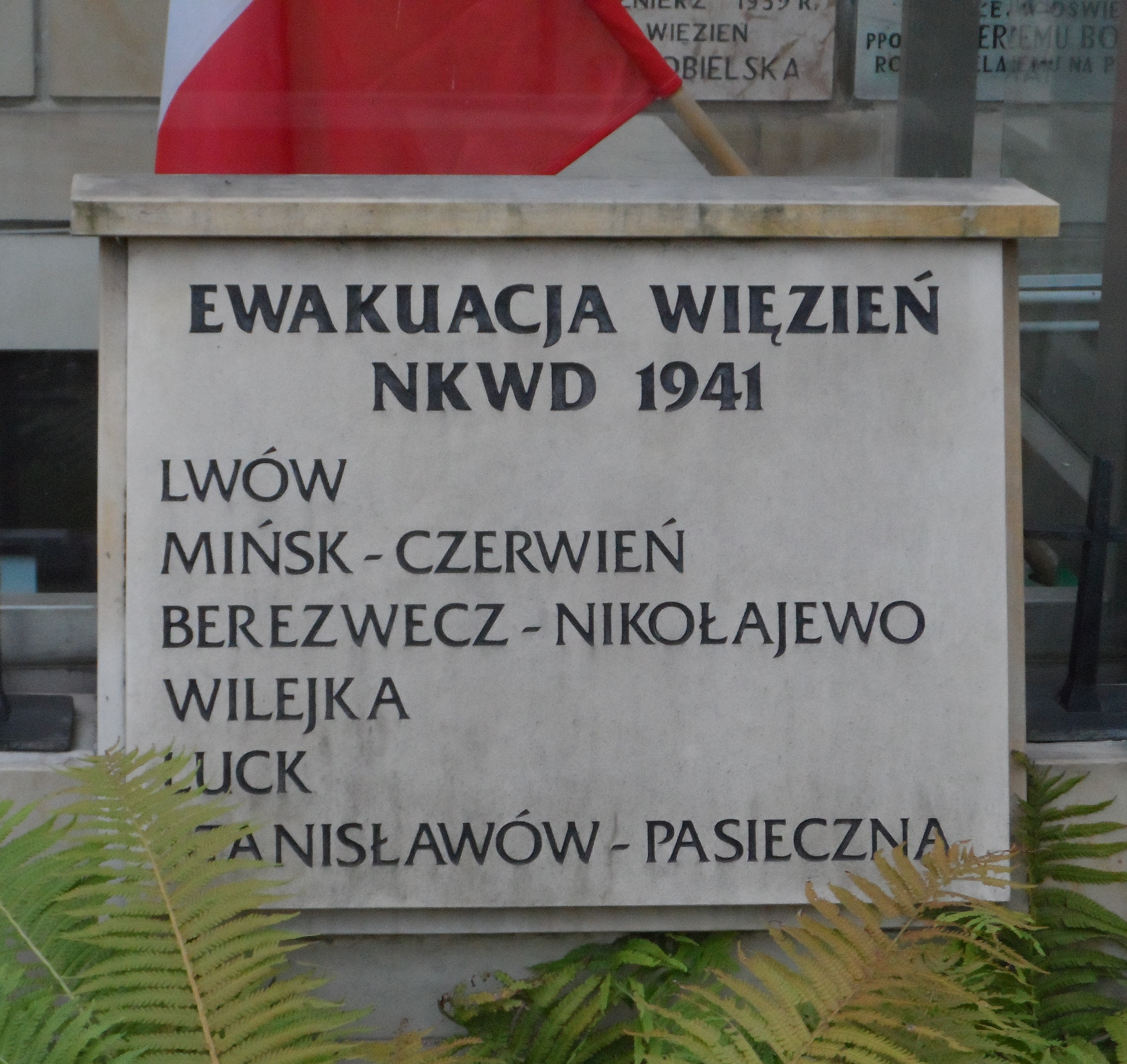
A plaque on the premises of the St. Stanislaus Kostka Church in Warsaw, commemorating the victims of the NKVD prisoner massacres, including prisoners from Lutsk

In 1941, Soviet propaganda initially attributed the Lutsk prison massacre to the Germans. When the Red Army regained control of Lutsk in 1944, the graves of the massacre victims were leveled. Official publications in the Soviet Union refrained from mentioning this crime until the late 1980s.

During the era of glasnost, a demonstration occurred on Castle Square in Lutsk on July 20, 1989, publicly recalling the NKVD's crimes against the prisoners of the Lutsk prison. Eleven days later, the prosecutor's office of the Volyn Oblast initiated an official investigation into the massacre. In the 1990s, following Ukraine's independence, monuments and commemorative plaques were erected at three of the four mass grave sites. In 2009, the Lutsk city council decided to commence archaeological excavations at the former prison site.

The victims of the Lutsk prison massacre are commemorated in an inscription on a plaque dedicated to the NKVD prison massacre victims at St. Stanislaus Kostka Church in Warsaw.

== Popular culture references ==
Scenes depicting the exhumation of victims murdered by the NKVD in the Lutsk prison serve as the opening for the novel The Kindly Ones by Jonathan Littell.

== Bibliography ==
- Hunczak, Taras (1986). "Ukrainian-Jewish Relations during the Soviet and Nazi Occupations". In Boshyk, Yury (ed.). Ukraine during World War II: History and its Aftermath. Edmonton: Canadian Institute of Ukrainian Studies. ISBN 0-920862-37-3.
- Kowalów, Witold Józef, ed. (2006). Spotkałem człowieka. Ks. Władysław Bukowiński w pamięci wiernych i przyjaciół [I met a Man. Fr. Władysław Bukowiński in the memory of his parishioners and friends] (in Polish). Vol. 2. Biały Dunajec– Ostróg: Ośrodek "Wołanie z Wołynia". ISBN 978-83-88863-28-8.
- Mazuryk, Jurij (2011-06-23). "O rozstrzelaniu w łuckim więzieniu w 1941 roku" [About massacre in Lutsk prison in 1941]. Monitor Wołyński (in Polish). 12 (48). Archived from the original on 2021-09-25.
- Musiał, Bogdan (2001). Rozstrzelać elementy kontrrewolucyjne. Brutalizacja wojny niemiecko-sowieckiej latem 1941 roku [Shoot the counter-revolutionary elements. The brutalization of the German-Soviet war in the summer of 1941] (in Polish). Warszawa: Stowarzyszenie Kulturalne Fronda. ISBN 83-88747-40-1.
- Popiński, Krzysztof; Kokurin, Aleksandr; Gurjanow, Aleksandr (1995). Drogi śmierci. Ewakuacja więzień sowieckich z Kresów Wschodnich II Rzeczypospolitej w czerwcu i lipcu 1941 [Roads of death. Evacuation of Soviet prisons from the Eastern Borderlands of the Second Polish Republic in June and July 1941] (in Polish). Warszawa: Wydawnictwo "Karta". ISBN 83-900676-9-2.
- Rhodes, Richard (2008). Mistrzowie śmierci. Einsatzgruppen [Masters of Death: The SS-Einsatzgruppen and the Invention of the Holocaust] (in Polish). Warszawa: Bellona. ISBN 978-83-11-11322-0.
- Sandberg, Eric (2014). ""This Incomprehensible Thing": Jonathan Littell's The Kindly Ones and the Aesthetics of Excess". The Cambridge Quarterly. 43 (3).
- Solonin, Mark (2015). Czerwiec 1941. Ostateczna diagnoza [June 1941. Final diagnosis] (in Polish). Poznań: Dom Wydawniczy Rebis. ISBN 978-83-7818-616-8.
- Zbrodnicza ewakuacja więzień i aresztów NKWD na Kresach Wschodnich II Rzeczypospolitej w czerwcu – lipcu 1941 roku. Materiały z sesji naukowej w 55. rocznicę ewakuacji więźniów NKWD w głąb ZSRR, Łódź 10 czerwca 1996 r. [Criminal evacuation of NKVD prisons and detention centers in the Eastern Borderlands of the Second Polish Republic in June–July 1941. Materials from the scientific session on the 55th anniversary of the evacuation of NKVD prisoners deep into the USSR, Łódź, June 10, 1996] (in Polish). Warszawa: Główna Komisja Badania Zbrodni przeciwko Narodowi Polskiemu – Instytut Pamięci Narodowej. 1997. ISBN 83-903356-6-2.
