= Jahor Marcinovič =

Belarusian journalist

- Ягор Марціновіч
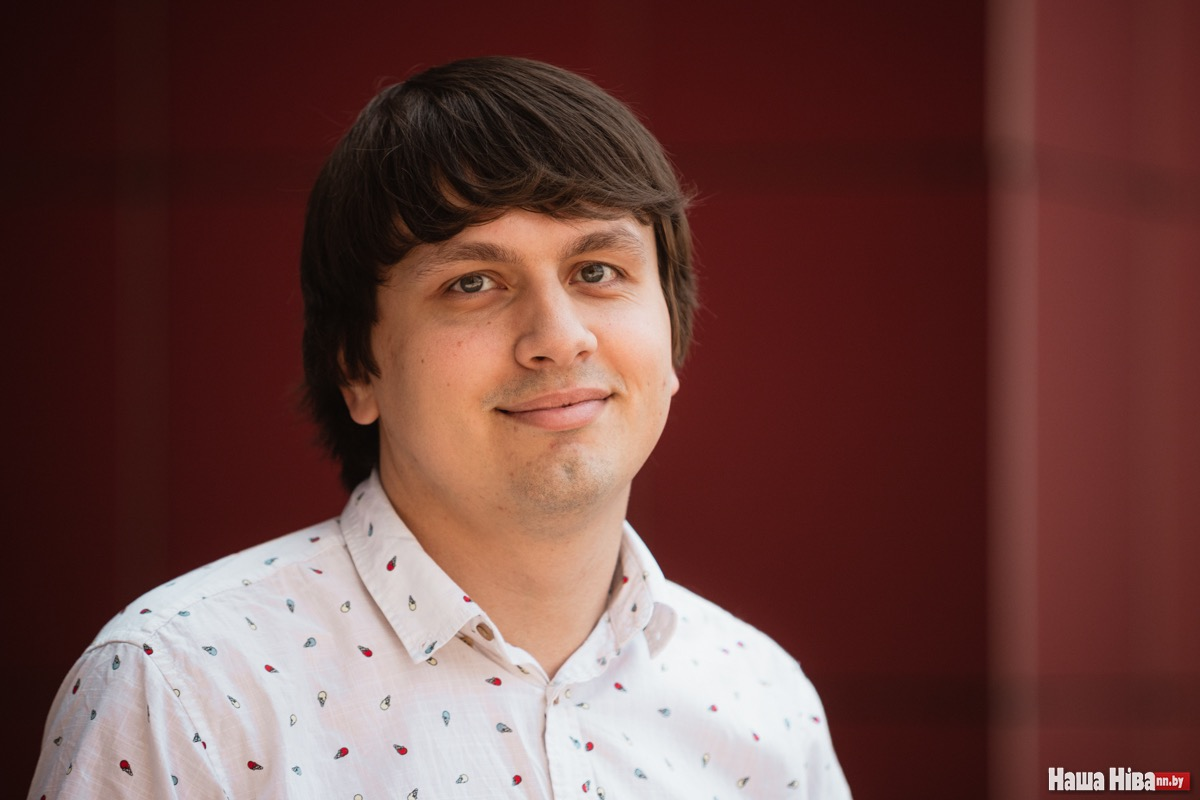
- Marcinovič in 2021
- Born: 3 September 1988 (age 38); Minsk, Byelorussian SSR, Soviet Union
- Education: Belarusian State University
- Occupation: Journalist
- Known for: Chief editor of Nasha Niva

Jahor Aljaksandravič Marcinovič (Belarusian: Ягор Аляксандравіч Марціновіч; born 3 September 1988) is a Belarusian journalist who is currently serving as chief editor of Nasha Niva since 2017. In July 2021, he was arrested for alleged debts of the newspaper to the electric company, estimated damage amounted to 10,000 Belarusian rubles ($3000). On 15 March 2022, he was sentenced to 2,5 years in prison. Human rights activists in Belarus have recognized him as a political prisoner.

== Biography ==
=== Family and career ===
Jahor is a son of Belarusian writer Ales Marcinovič and poet Tatiana Mushinskaya. His brother Denis Marcinovič is a historian and journalist.

Jahor graduated from the BSU Journalism faculty in 2011. He started working at Nasha Niva in 2009 and became an author of many important interviews, reports and investigations. In 2017, he replaced Andrej Skurko on the post of chief editor.

In 2015, 2016, and 2017, he was awarded with BAJ prize 'Volnaye Slova'.

Marcinovič has experienced pressure from the authorities for his journalistic activity many times. On 23 September 2020, he was detained for three days for alleged defamation of the MVD vice minister Alexander Barsukou, his apartment was searched. Marcinovič as the NN chief editor was taken responsible for alleged defamation in the published interview, where a former prisoner of a detention centre claimed to be beaten by Barsukou.

In March 2021, he was arrested while covering the meeting in Minsk square and sentenced to a fine for participation in an unauthorized demonstration, even though he denied participating in the meeting. After the president election of 2020 he was arrested on August 11, 2020, and released with a travel ban.

=== 2021 arrests ===
Together with the head of marketing Andrej Skurko and journalist, head of NN publications "Nasha Historyja" and "Arche" Andrej Dyńko, Jahor was arrested on 8 July 2021. He was beaten by the police and received head injury. For 24 hours was kept at the Okrestina detention center without food, mattress or bedding. Later Marcinovič was charged under part 2 of Art.216 of the Belarusian Criminal Code for alleged NN debts to the "Minenergo" company. According to the police, the NN failed to pay utility bills for 4 years and damaged the company by 3500 thousand Belarusian roubles.

Marcinovič should have been released on 16 July 2021, but he was charged under another article of Criminal Code for alleged causing of mass disorders. His message from November 2021 was that he was kept with 19 persons in a basement cell and that he was suffocating. On 15 March 2022, Marcinovič and Skurko were sentenced to 2.5 years in prison for estimated material damage of 10,000 Belarusian rubles (US$3,000) to Minenergo. According to the investigators, in May 2017, they opened offices in Skurko's apartment but kept paying for electricity as individuals, while Belarusian law obliges legal persons to pay increased rates. The damages were paid.

The Viasna Human Rights Centre, the Belarusian Helsinki Committee, and other human rights organisations recognized him as a political prisoner.
