= Zaslawskaye reservoir =

Water reservoir in Minsk Region, Belarus

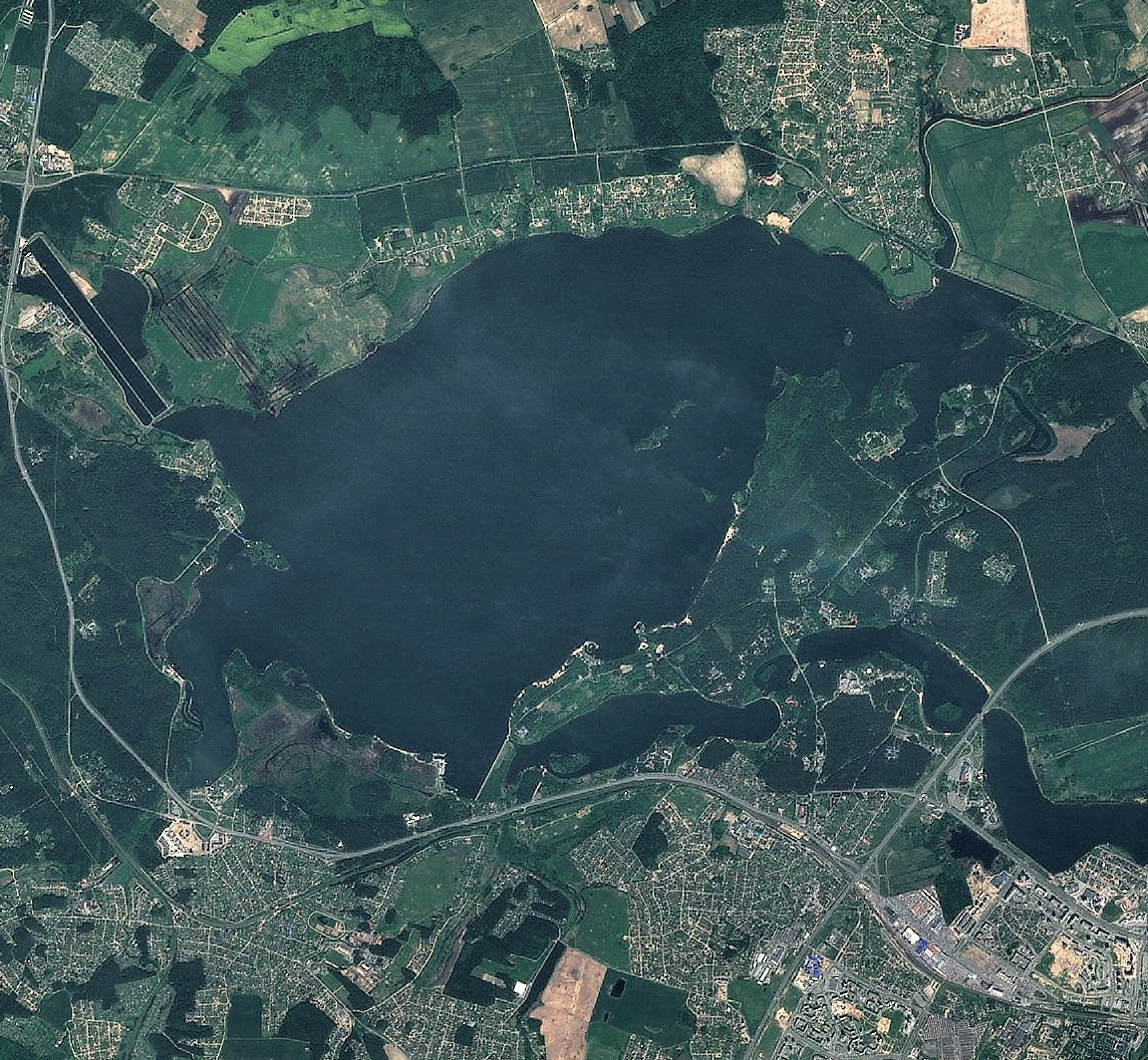
- Satellite photo of the Minsk sea, 2019

- Location within Belarus
- Location: Minsk Region
- Coordinates: 53°58′34″N 27°22′46″E
- Lake type: Artificial
- Basin countries: Belarus
- Max. length: 10 km (6.2 mi)
- Max. width: 4.5 km (2.8 mi)
- Surface area: 31.1 km^{2} (12.0 sq mi)
- Average depth: 3.5 m (11 ft)
- Max. depth: 8 m (26 ft)
- Water volume: 108.5 million cubic metres (3.83×10^{9} cu ft)
- Shore length^{1}: 55 km (34 mi)
- Settlements: Zaslawye
- ^{1} Shore length is not a well-defined measure.

Zaslawskaye reservoir (Belarusian: Заслаўскае вадасховішча, Russian: Заславское водохранилище) is a water reservoir in the Vileyka-Minsk water system. It is the second largest artificial lake in Belarus. It is located only 5 km from the northwestern edge of Minsk, and is often called the Minsk sea.

== Description ==
Zaslawskaye reservoir is the second largest artificial reservoir of Belarus, second in size to the largest Vileyka reservoir. It was created in 1956 by a dam on a Svislach river in order to control floods in Minsk and to regulate the flow of the river. It is part of the Vileyka-Minsk water system. The bowl of the reservoir was a swampy floodplain of the Svisloch, Vyacha, Ratomka and Chernyavka rivers before flooding. It is located just 5 km from Minsk, and is often called the Minsk sea.

== Gallery ==
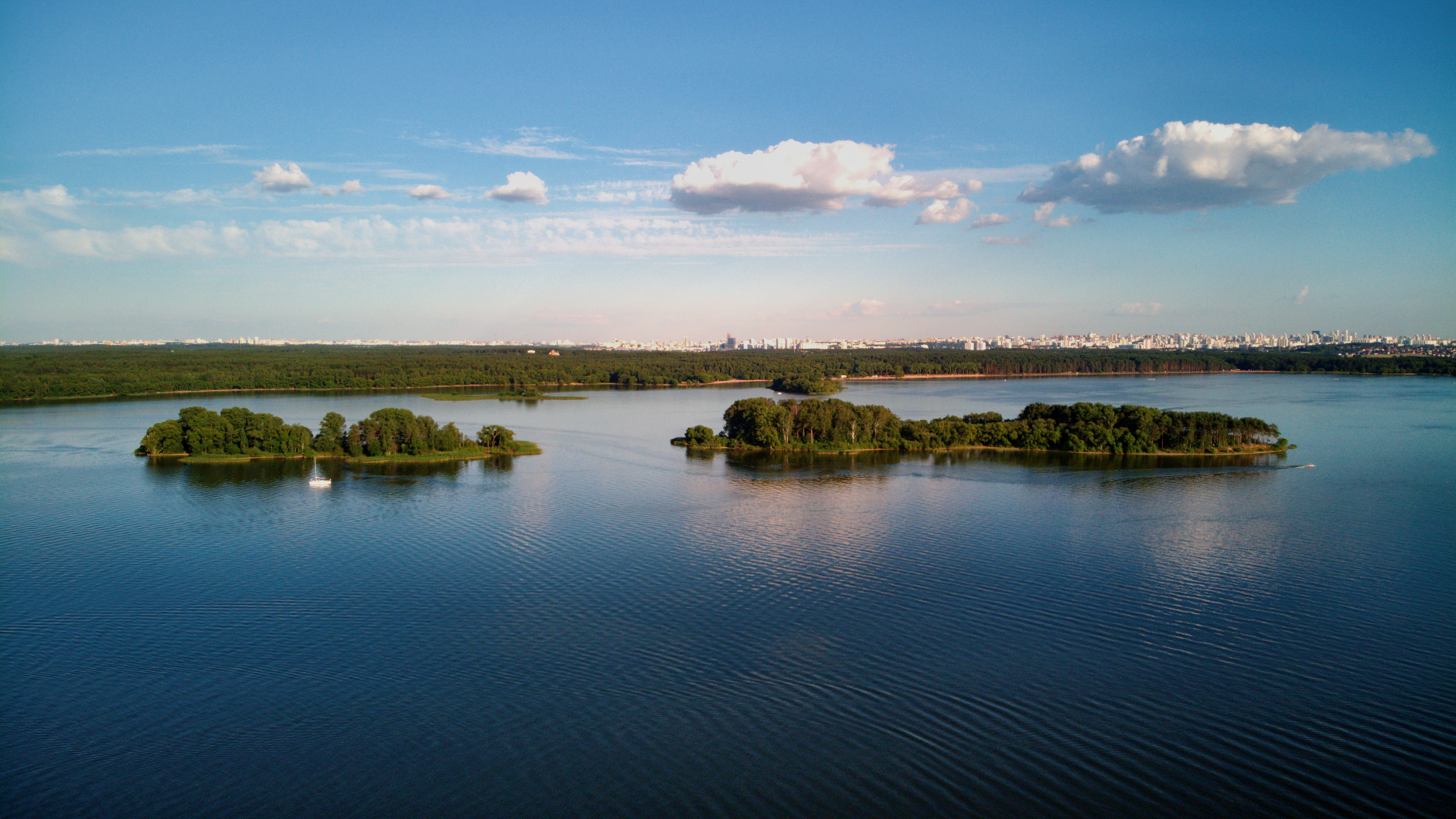
Isles in the reservoir

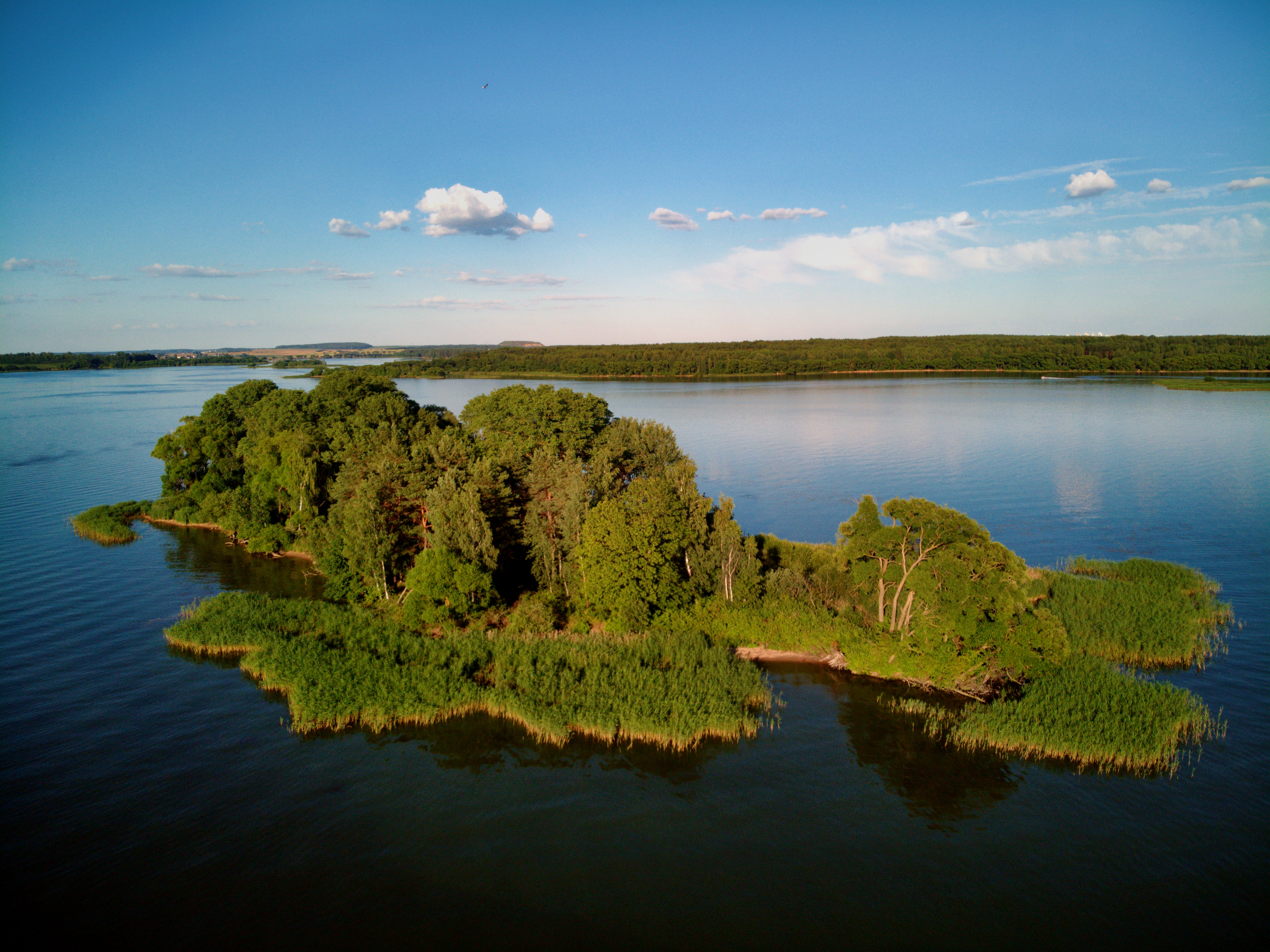
Isle

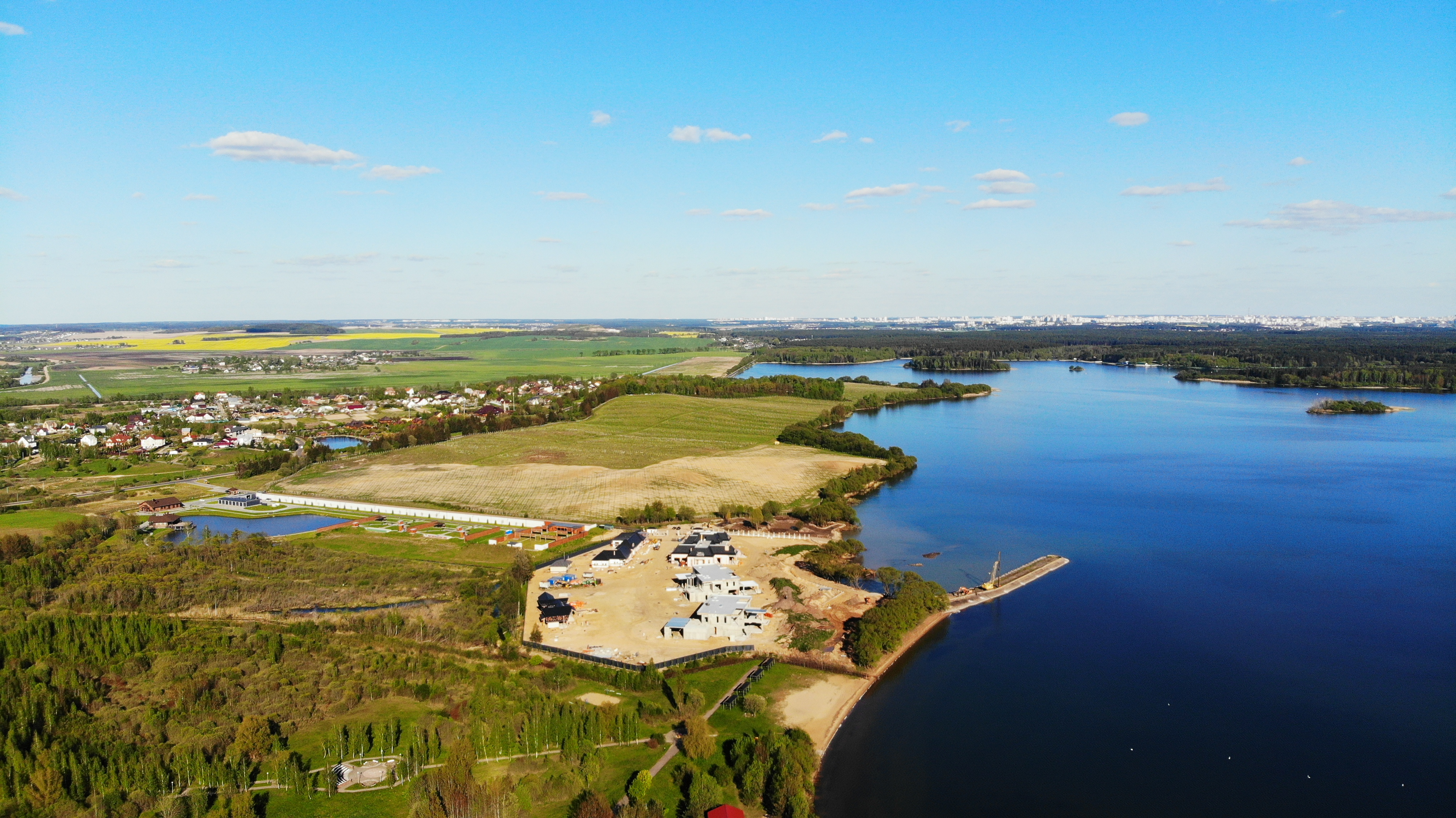
Photo from a drone

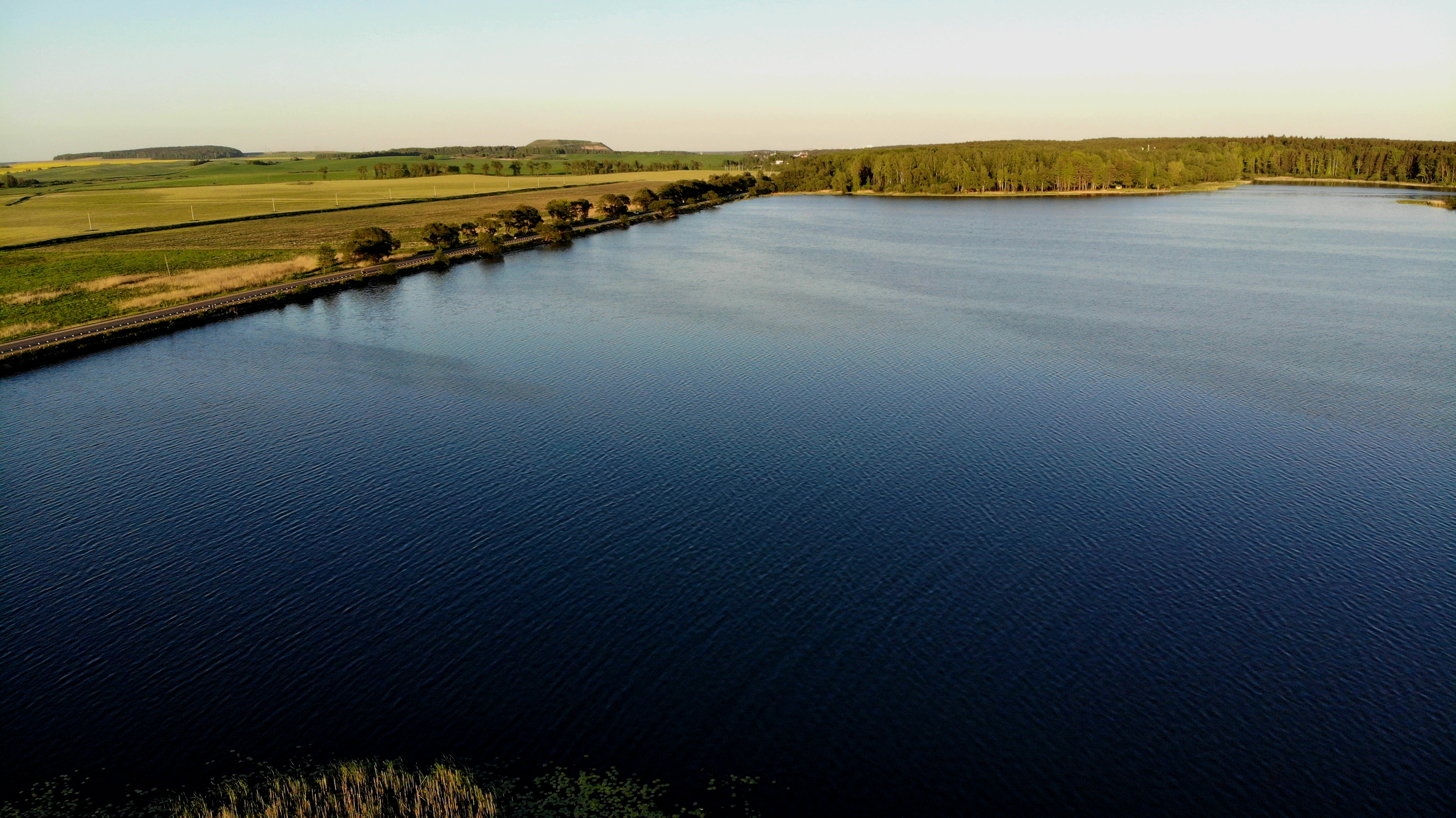
Photo from a drone

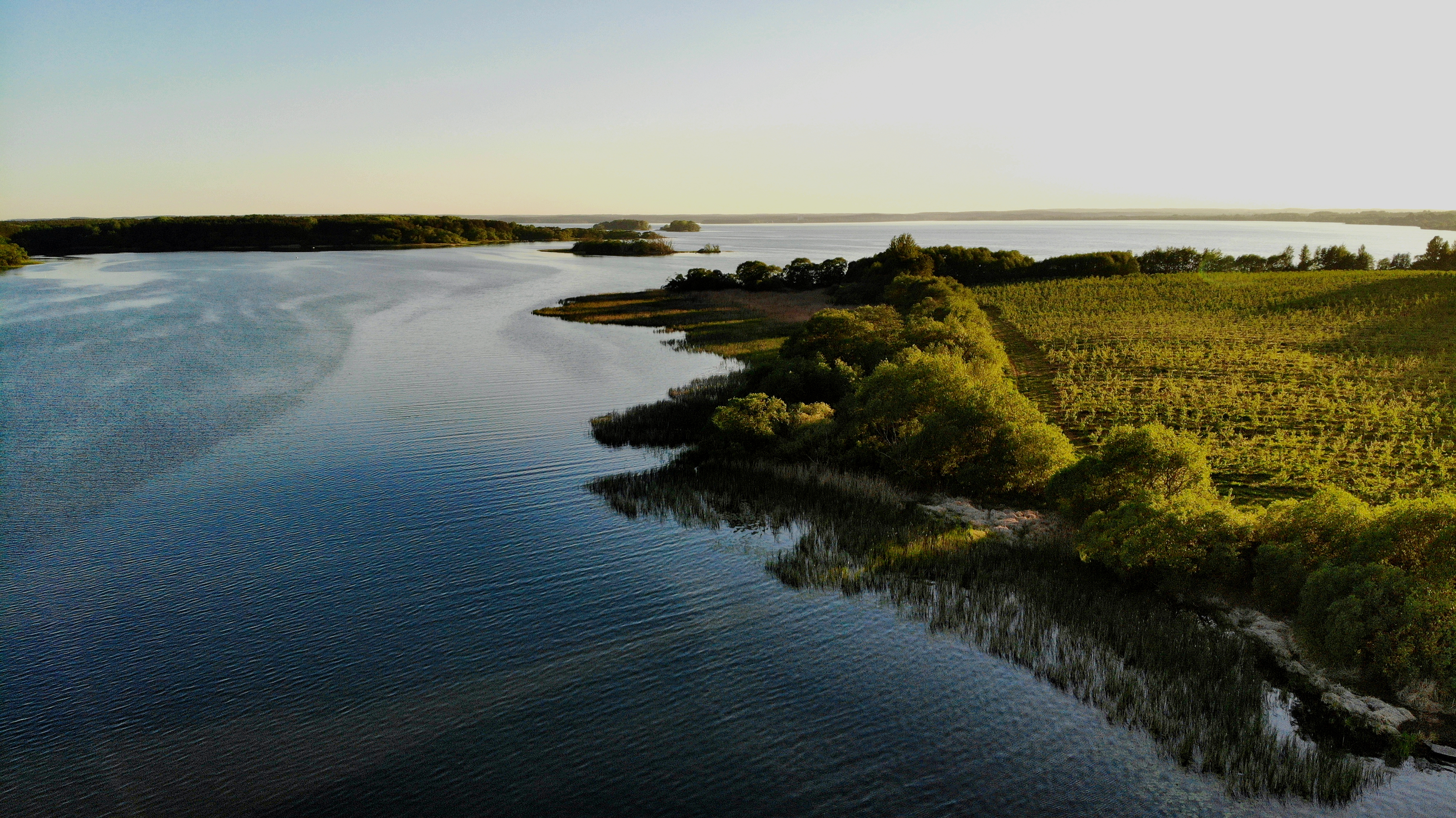
Photo from a drone
