= Vileyka-Barysaw Death Road =

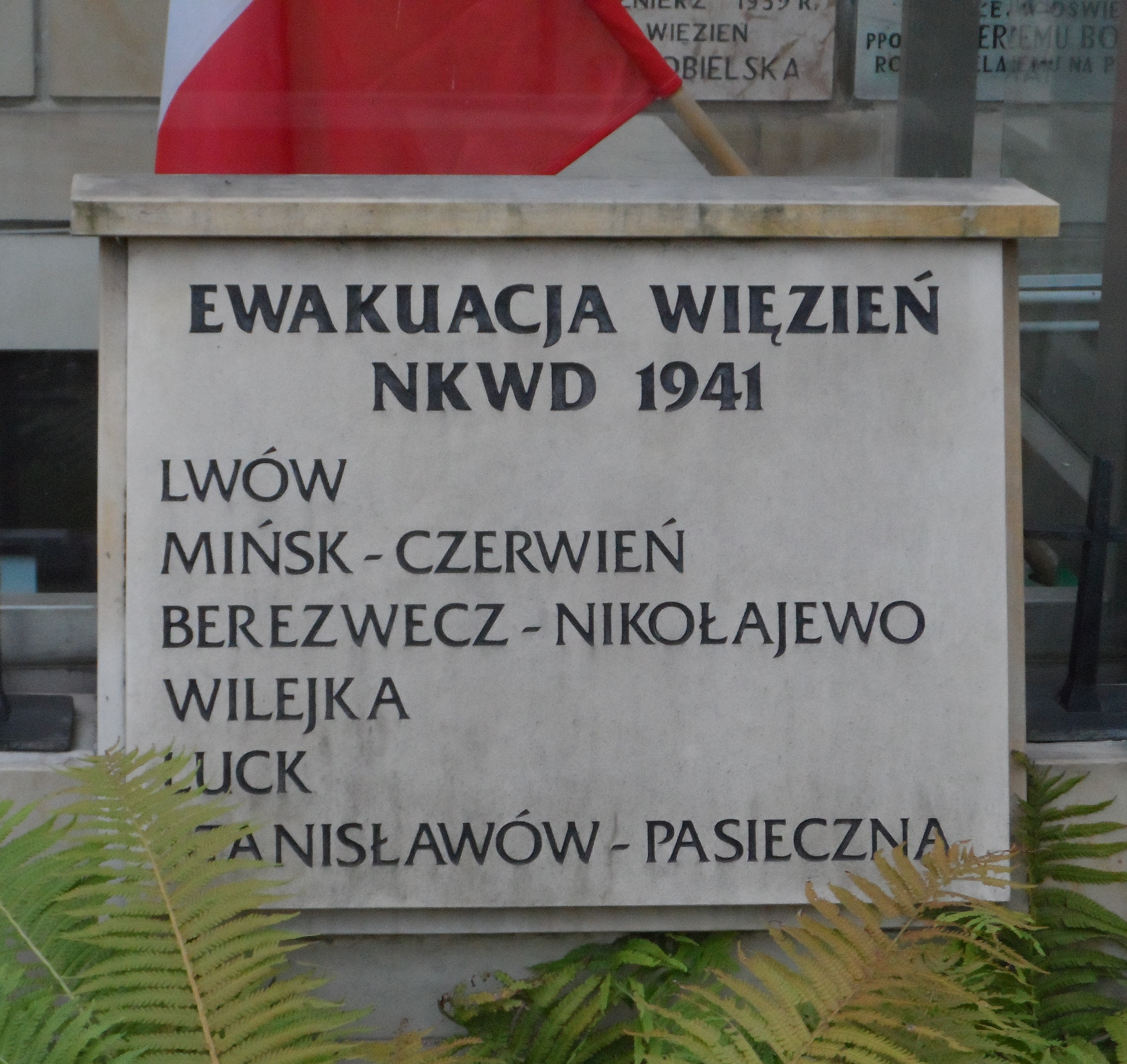
A plaque on the premises of the St. Stanislaus Kostka Church in Warsaw, commemorating the victims of the NKVD prisoner massacres, including prisoners from Vileyka

The Vileyka-Barysaw Death Road refers to the compelled evacuation and massacre of inmates from the prison in the city of Vileyka, then in occupied Poland and now in Belarus. The liquidation of the prison, carried out by the NKVD after the German invasion of the USSR, began on June 24, 1941. The prisoners were formed into several marching columns and then forcibly marched eastward towards Barysaw. During the march, an estimated 500 to 800 prisoners died at the hands of guards. Those who managed to reach Barysaw were then transported by train to Ryazan. This atrocity was one of several prisoner massacres carried out by the Soviet secret police and army during the summer of 1941.

== Background ==
During the interwar period, Vileyka (Belarusian: Вілейка, Polish: Wilejka) was located within the borders of the Second Polish Republic and served as the center of the Vileyka county in Wilno Voivodeship. After the German-Soviet invasion of Poland in 1939, the city fell under Soviet occupation.

Those apprehended by the NKVD were confined in the cells of a pre-war Polish prison. The prison in Vileyka was one of four Soviet prisons operating in Vileyka Oblast. It was referred to as 'Prison No. 26' in Soviet official documents. It served as both a remand prison and a staging prison from which inmates were deported deep into the Soviet Union. Between 1939 and 1941, numerous executions took place on the premises of the prison.

On June 22, 1941, Nazi Germany commenced its invasion of the Soviet Union. With the rapid advancement of the German offensive, the NKVD exterminated political prisoners in the war zone. In the summer of 1941, within the part of Poland occupied by the USSR, an estimated 20,000 to 30,000 individuals in prisons and detention centers were murdered.

The "death marches" or "death roads" were a characteristic method used to liquidate Soviet prisons in present-day western Belarus. Prisoners were forcibly taken from their cells and compelled to march east in scorching summer conditions for several days. This 'evacuation' method led to mass deaths among prisoners due to exhaustion, hunger, and thirst. Some fell victim to German air raids, while others were massacred by Soviet guards.

== The course of events ==
According to documents from Soviet archives, as of June 10, 1941, the prison in Vileyka held 1031 inmates. Additional NKVD records from June 1941 concerning the planned evacuation of the prisoners from Vileyka deep into USSR indicated an intended evacuation of 1023 inmates.

On June 23, 1941, the representative of the prison branch of the NKVD of the Byelorussian SSR, a head of the operational department named Pariemsky, who was in Maladzyechna at the time, called the prison warden and ordered immediate evacuation of prisoners from Vileyka.

The next day, the guards took most of the inmates out to the inner courtyard of the prison. People who were unable to march or were accused of particularly serious crimes remained in their cells. Also, from the crowd gathered in the courtyard, 20 people were called by name and ordered to return to their cells. Then two columns were formed – one composed of political prisoners, the other of criminal prisoners – which were taken out of the prison and rushed towards the east. Soon after, another column left the prison, this time consisting of about 200 women. The last group of several hundred prisoners was taken out of Vileyka prison on June 25.

Some of the prisoners were executed by the NKVD in Vileyka. The 1995 publication Roads of Death by KARTA Center stated that one hundred and several dozen people were executed. Contrary, the findings of the District Commission for the Prosecution of Crimes against the Polish Nation in Łódź show that on June 24, 28 prisoners were shot, who had been sentenced to death or long prison sentences before the outbreak of the war. The bodies of the victims were buried in a mass grave dug near the headquarters of the local NKVD outpost. (Note: After the Soviets left, two mass graves were found in Vileyka prison, in which, according to witnesses, from 250 to 300 bodies were found. Traces of two other graves of similar volume were also discovered, but no attempt was made to excavate them. However, it is most probable that these graves contained the corpses of the victims of executions carried out by the NKVD before June 22, 1941. See: Paduszyńska (1997), p. 96.) Polish investigators managed to determine the names of seven victims. (Note: On June 24, 1941, there were 30 prisoners on death row in Vileyka, ten of whom had been transported from the prison in Ašmiany before the outbreak of the German-Soviet war. Out of this thirty-person group of convicts, only two prisoners escaped immediate execution. Both died during the "death march." See: Paduszyńska (1997), p. 96.)

The fate of prisoners who were evacuated from the prison was also tragic. After leaving Vileyka prison, the marching columns were divided into smaller groups and then driven along different routes through Plyeshchanitsy to Barysaw. During the march, prisoners received only minimal rations of water and food. People who could not keep up with the column or tried to escape were shot or bayoneted by the guards.

During the evacuation, multiple summary executions took place. One of the columns, numbering 150 or 500 people, was attacked by the Luftwaffe near Chacienčycy, soon after crossing the pre-war Polish-Soviet border. After the air raid, the guards took the prisoners to a nearby forest and shot them there. Only one person survived the massacre. In turn, the bodies of 30 prisoners with their hands tied behind their backs were found near the village of Sosienka in the gmina of Kascianievičy. (Note: Some of the prisoners' relatives and friends followed the columns sent out from Vileyka. They were the ones who primarily found the bodies of the victims along the route of the evacuation columns. See: Paduszyńska (1997), p. 97.) It is known that executions also took place near the village of Kasuta in the gmina of Kuraniec (approximately 50–60 victims) and near the village of Malmygi in the same commune (an undetermined number of victims). After reaching Barysaw, the prisoners who survived the nearly 100-kilometer march were loaded into wagons and taken to the east.

The fate of the female prisoners who were taken out of Vileyka prison on June 24 was different. Along the way, just like the male prisoners, they died at the hands of the guards (the number of those murdered was at least 5–6 individuals). However, since the Wehrmacht blocked the evacuation routes, the column was returned to Vileyka. The women were again imprisoned. They remained unsupervised and without water or food for two days and three nights. Shortly before the German troops entered the city, the building was set on fire by unknown perpetrators. However, the fire did not reach the cells where women were held, as well as these prisoners who had not yet been evacuated on June 24–25. Consequently, inmates managed to get out of prison before the Germans arrived, with the help of the inhabitants of Vileyka.

== Number of victims ==
Due to divergent witness statements, it is difficult to determine the exact number of prisoners who were taken out of Vileyka and murdered on the way to Barysaw. Usually, the number of victims is estimated to be between 500 and 800 people.

One witness claimed that over 1,500 men were released from prison, of whom about 900 survived the march to Barysaw and subsequent evacuation by train. His testimony is to some extent confirmed by the "List of departures and movements of transports from NKVD prisons of the Byelorussian SSR," which states that on July 2, 1941, a transport with 850 prisoners from Vileyka passed through Vyazma and was heading to Ryazan.

== Bibliography ==
- Galiński, Antoni (1997). "Więzienia NKWD na Kresach Wschodnich II Rzeczypospolitej w latach 1939–1941 na podstawie dokumentacji Okręgowej Komisji Badania Zbrodni przeciwko Narodowi Polskiemu w Łodzi – Instytutu Pamięci Narodowej" [NKVD prisons in the Eastern Borderlands of the Second Polish Republic in 1939–1941 in the light of documents gathered by the District Commission for the Prosecution of Crimes against the Polish Nation in Łódź – Institute of National Remembrance]. In Mikoda, Janina (ed.). Zbrodnicza ewakuacja więzień i aresztów NKWD na Kresach Wschodnich II Rzeczypospolitej w czerwcu – lipcu 1941 roku. Materiały z sesji naukowej w 55. rocznicę ewakuacji więźniów NKWD w głąb ZSRR, Łódź 10 czerwca 1996 r. [Criminal evacuation of NKVD prisons and detention centers in the Eastern Borderlands of the Second Polish Republic in June-July 1941. Materials from the scientific session on the 55th anniversary of the evacuation of NKVD prisoners deep into the USSR, Łódź, June 10, 1996] (in Polish). Warszawa: Główna Komisja Badania Zbrodni przeciwko Narodowi Polskiemu – Instytut Pamięci Narodowej. ISBN 83-903356-6-2.
- Głowacki, Albin (1997). "Organizacja i funkcjonowanie więziennictwa NKWD na Kresach Wschodnich II Rzeczypospolitej w latach 1939–1941" [Organization and functioning of the NKVD prison system in the Eastern Borderlands of the Second Polish Republic in 1939–1941]. In Mikoda, Janina (ed.). Zbrodnicza ewakuacja więzień i aresztów NKWD na Kresach Wschodnich II Rzeczypospolitej w czerwcu – lipcu 1941 roku. Materiały z sesji naukowej w 55. rocznicę ewakuacji więźniów NKWD w głąb ZSRR, Łódź 10 czerwca 1996 r. [Criminal evacuation of NKVD prisons and detention centers in the Eastern Borderlands of the Second Polish Republic in June-July 1941. Materials from the scientific session on the 55th anniversary of the evacuation of NKVD prisoners deep into the USSR, Łódź, June 10, 1996] (in Polish). Warszawa: Główna Komisja Badania Zbrodni przeciwko Narodowi Polskiemu – Instytut Pamięci Narodowej. ISBN 83-903356-6-2.
- Musiał, Bogdan (2001). Rozstrzelać elementy kontrrewolucyjne. Brutalizacja wojny niemiecko-sowieckiej latem 1941 roku [Shoot the counter-revolutionary elements. The brutalization of the German-Soviet war in the summer of 1941] (in Polish). Warszawa: Stowarzyszenie Kulturalne Fronda. ISBN 83-88747-40-1.
- Paduszyńska, Marianna (1997). "Więzienia NKWD w Oszmianie, Wilejce, Wołożynie i Mińsku w latach 1939–1941" [NKVD prisons in Ašmiany, Vileyka, Valozhyn and Minsk in the years 1939–1941]. In Mikoda, Janina (ed.). Zbrodnicza ewakuacja więzień i aresztów NKWD na Kresach Wschodnich II Rzeczypospolitej w czerwcu – lipcu 1941 roku. Materiały z sesji naukowej w 55. rocznicę ewakuacji więźniów NKWD w głąb ZSRR, Łódź 10 czerwca 1996 r. [Criminal evacuation of NKVD prisons and detention centers in the Eastern Borderlands of the Second Polish Republic in June-July 1941. Materials from the scientific session on the 55th anniversary of the evacuation of NKVD prisoners deep into the USSR, Łódź, June 10, 1996] (in Polish). Warszawa: Główna Komisja Badania Zbrodni przeciwko Narodowi Polskiemu – Instytut Pamięci Narodowej. ISBN 83-903356-6-2.
- Popiński, Krzysztof (1997). "Ewakuacja więzień kresowych w czerwcu 1941 r. na podstawie dokumentacji "Memoriału" i Archiwum Wschodniego" [Evacuation of Eastern Borderlands’ prisons in June 1941 in the light of documents gathered by the "Memorial" and the Eastern Archive]. In Mikoda, Janina (ed.). Zbrodnicza ewakuacja więzień i aresztów NKWD na Kresach Wschodnich II Rzeczypospolitej w czerwcu – lipcu 1941 roku. Materiały z sesji naukowej w 55. rocznicę ewakuacji więźniów NKWD w głąb ZSRR, Łódź 10 czerwca 1996 r. [Criminal evacuation of NKVD prisons and detention centers in the Eastern Borderlands of the Second Polish Republic in June-July 1941. Materials from the scientific session on the 55th anniversary of the evacuation of NKVD prisoners deep into the USSR, Łódź, June 10, 1996] (in Polish). Warszawa: Główna Komisja Badania Zbrodni przeciwko Narodowi Polskiemu – Instytut Pamięci Narodowej. ISBN 83-903356-6-2.
- Popiński, Krzysztof; Kokurin, Aleksandr; Gurjanow, Aleksandr (1995). Drogi śmierci. Ewakuacja więzień sowieckich z Kresów Wschodnich II Rzeczypospolitej w czerwcu i lipcu 1941 [Roads of death. Evacuation of Soviet prisons from the Eastern Borderlands of the Second Polish Republic in June and July 1941] (in Polish). Warszawa: Wydawnictwo "Karta". ISBN 83-900676-9-2.
