= Vileyka =

Town in Minsk Region, Belarus

Vileyka Вілейка (Belarusian) Вилейка (Russian)
- Town
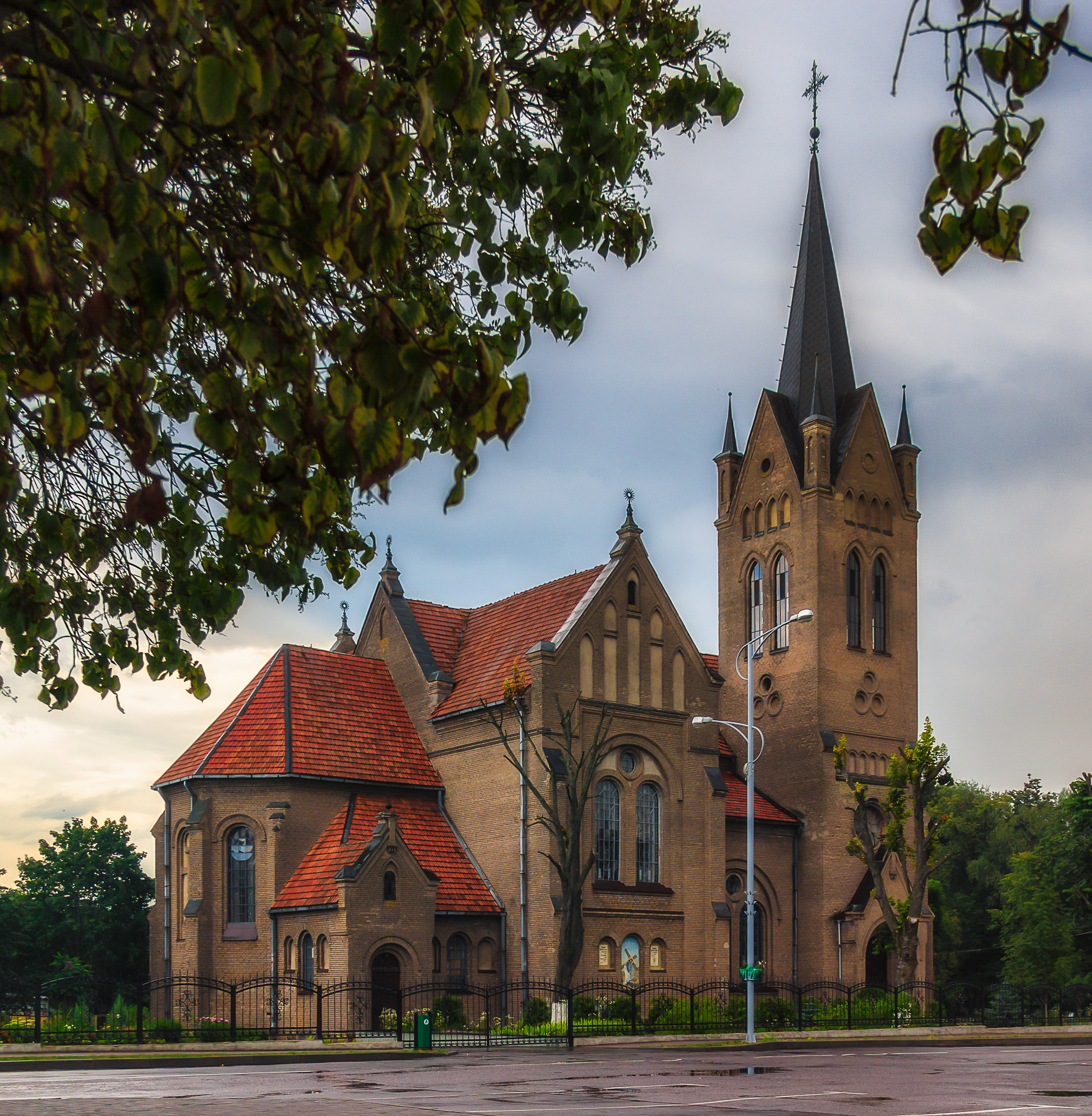
- Church of the Exaltation of the Holy Cross

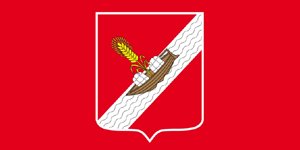
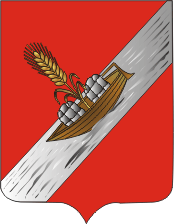
- Flag Coat of arms

- Location within Belarus
- Coordinates: 54°29′50″N 26°54′40″E
- Country: Belarus
- Region: Minsk Region
- District: Vileyka District
- Elevation: 183 m (600 ft)

Population (2026)
  - Total: 26,015
- Time zone: UTC+3 (MSK)
- Postal code: 222410
- Area code: +375 1771
- License plate: 5
- Website: Official website

Vileyka or Vilyeyka (Note: Belarusian: Вілейка, romanized: Viliejka, [vʲiˈlʲɛjka]; Russian: Вилейка; Lithuanian: Vileika, Polish: Wilejka.) is a town in Minsk Region, Belarus. It serves as the administrative center of Vileyka District. It is located on the Viliya River, 100 kilometres (62 mi) northwest of Minsk. The first historical record dates from 16 November 1460. As of 2026, the town has a population of 26,015.

The Vileyka VLF transmitter operated by the Russian Navy is located near Vileyka. It provides VLF communication between Russian Navy's headquarters and atomic submarines in the Atlantic, Indian and parts of the Pacific Ocean.

== History ==
In the 10th–13th centuries, the territory was under the Principality of Polotsk, and in XIV–XVII under Grand Duchy of Lithuania as manor house Kurenets. The city was first mentioned in 1460 as a borough center of the Vileyka Starostwo of the Ashmyany county in Grand Duchy of Lithuania.

- 1793 – during the Second Partition of Poland the town is ceded to the Russian Empire..
- 1915, September 14 – occupied by the German Army, but several days later recovered by the Russian Army during the Sventiany Offensive.
- 1918, December – occupied by German Army

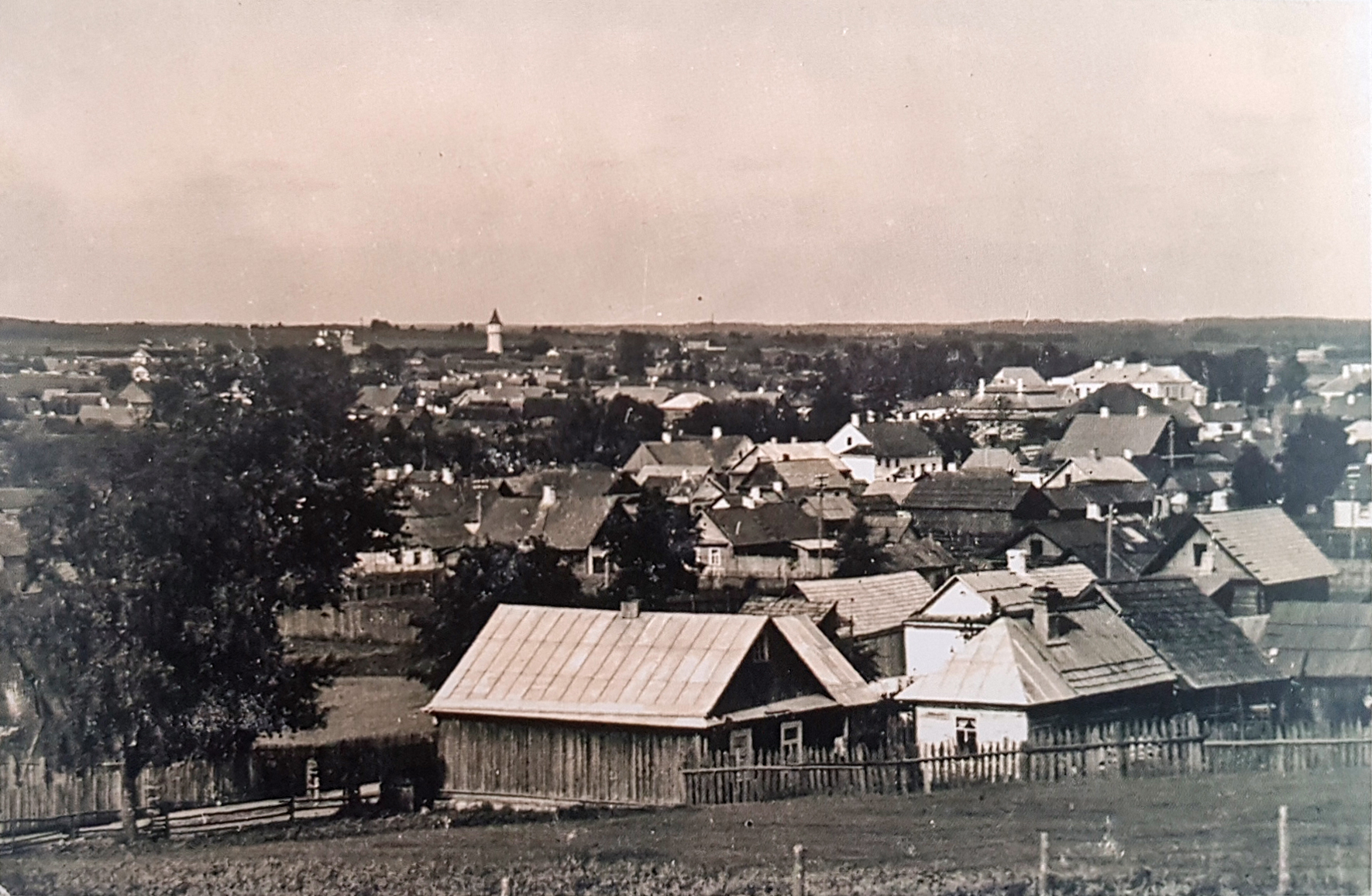
Wilejka in the 1920s

- 1919 – ceded to Poland in the Peace of Riga following Polish–Soviet War, becoming the center of the Wilejka county in the Wilno Voivodeship (1923–1939)
- 1939 – annexed back to Soviet Union during the Soviet invasion of Poland in accordance with the conditions of the Molotov–Ribbentrop Pact. Becomes center of the Vileyka Voblast of BSSR
- 1941, June 24–25 – following the German invasion of the USSR over 1,000 inmates from Vileyka prison were forcibly marched eastward towards Barysaw. During the march, an estimated 500 to 800 prisoners died at the hands of guards.
- 1941, June 25 – occupied by troops of the German Army Group Centre during the first stage of Operation Barbarossa and placed under the administration of the Generalbezirk Weißruthenien of Reichskommissariat Ostland. Over 15,000 civilians massacred including 6,972 Polish Jews.
- 1941, July 12 and 30 – German SS forces murder the remaining Jewish citizens in Vileyka (over 500 people).
- 1944, July 2 – Vileyka recaptured by troops of the 3rd Belorussian Front of the Red Army during the Minsk Offensive.

== Geography ==
The city is located on the right bank of the river Viliya, in the northwest part of the Minsk region, 100 kilometers from Minsk. The town's population numbers 30,000 people.

The territory of the Vileyka district is 2,400 square kilometres (930 sq mi). Forests account for 41% of the territory. The main part of the district is situated within the borders of Narach-Vileyka lowland. In the year 1974, near the town of Vileyka Belarus's largest artificial reservoir was built — Vileyka reservoir with a total area of 63.3 km^{2} (24.4 sq mi) and a volume of 238 million cubic metres (8.4×10^{9} cu ft).

== Demographics ==
Historical population

| Year | Pop. | ±% |
|---|---|---|
| 1897 | 3,600 | — |
| 1921 | 3,417 | −5.1% |
| 1931 | 5,848 | +71.1% |
| 1939 | 7,500 | +28.2% |
| 1959 | 8,200 | +9.3% |
| 1970 | 12,200 | +48.8% |
| 1979 | 20,747 | +70.1% |

| Year | Pop. | ±% |
|---|---|---|
| 1989 | 28,077 | +35.3% |
| 2006 | 28,103 | +0.1% |
| 2018 | 26,760 | −4.8% |
| 2023 | 26,811 | +0.2% |
| 2024 | 26,625 | −0.7% |
| 2025 | 26,375 | −0.9% |
| 2026 | 26,015 | −1.4% |

According to the 1921 Polish census, the town's population was 62.8% Polish, 27.4% Belarusian and 8.1% Jewish.

== Notable residents ==
- Alaksandar Ułasaŭ (1874–1941), Belarusian politician, a founder and the first editor of the newspaper Naša Niva, and a victim of Stalin's purges
- Pavel Byahanski (born 1981), former football player

== International relations ==
=== Twin towns — Sister cities ===
Vileyka is twinned with:

- Mozhaysk, Russia
- Pereiaslav, Ukraine
- Willmar, Minnesota, United States
