= Siarhiej Palujan =

- Сяргей Палуян
- Born: October 19, 1890; Brahin
- Died: April 20, 1910 (aged 19); Kyiv
- Occupation(s): Belarusian writer, journalist and theatre and literary critic

Siarhiej Pałujan (Belarusian: Сяргей Палуян; 19 October 1890, Brahin — 20 April 1910, Kyiv) was a Belarusian writer, journalist and theatre and literary critic.

== Early years ==
Pałujan was born in Brahin (now a district capital in Homel Province), into a large family. His father worked as a tenant farmer but was later able to purchase a farm in Kryšyčy (now in Kalinkavičy District, Homel Province), where Pałujan would spend most of his childhood. He first studied in Mazyr at a six-year secondary school, and later at a gymnasium in Mitava (now Jelgava, Latvia). Threatened with expulsion for anti-government activities, he terminated his studies and returned to Belarus where he worked on his father's farm.

Pałujan's involvement in the 1905 revolution resulted in estrangement from his father. He left the farm and went to Kyiv where he earned a modest living publishing articles and reviews in Ukrainian periodicals and doing temporary work as a tutor and proofreader, etc. In 1908, he joined the governing body of the Belarusian Socialist Assembly.

== Career at Nasha Niva ==
Between 1909 and 1910, Pałujan lived in Vilnia and was employed by Nasha Niva. There he met prominent Belarusian literary figures, such as Janka Kupala and Ciška Hatrny. He persuaded the editors of Nasha Niva to publish poems of Maksim Bahdanovič, which the editors initially considered "incomprehensible to people". This resulted in friendship between the writers (evidenced by the fact that Bahdanovič's collection Wreath was dedicated to the memory of Pałujan).

== Death ==
In March 1910, Pałujan abruptly terminated his seemingly successful literature career with Naša Niva and returned to Kyiv. On the night of 20 April, in his twentieth year, he committed suicide.

== Heritage ==
Apart from his literary works "Village" and "Christ is Risen!", Pałujan is known for his literary reviews (such as "Belarusian literature in 1909", "Belarusian poetry in its typical representatives", review of Jakub Kolas's textbook "Second reading for Belarusian children") and was described as “one of the founders of Belarusian professional literary criticism”.

He is also known as a theatre critic (notable reviews being "Belarusian party in Vilnius" and "Belarusian parties") and researcher of Ukrainian culture and literature and Belarusian-Ukrainian literary ties.
