= Zaslawye =

Town in Minsk Region, Belarus

Zaslawye Заслаўе (Belarusian) Заславль (Russian) Zaslavl
- Town
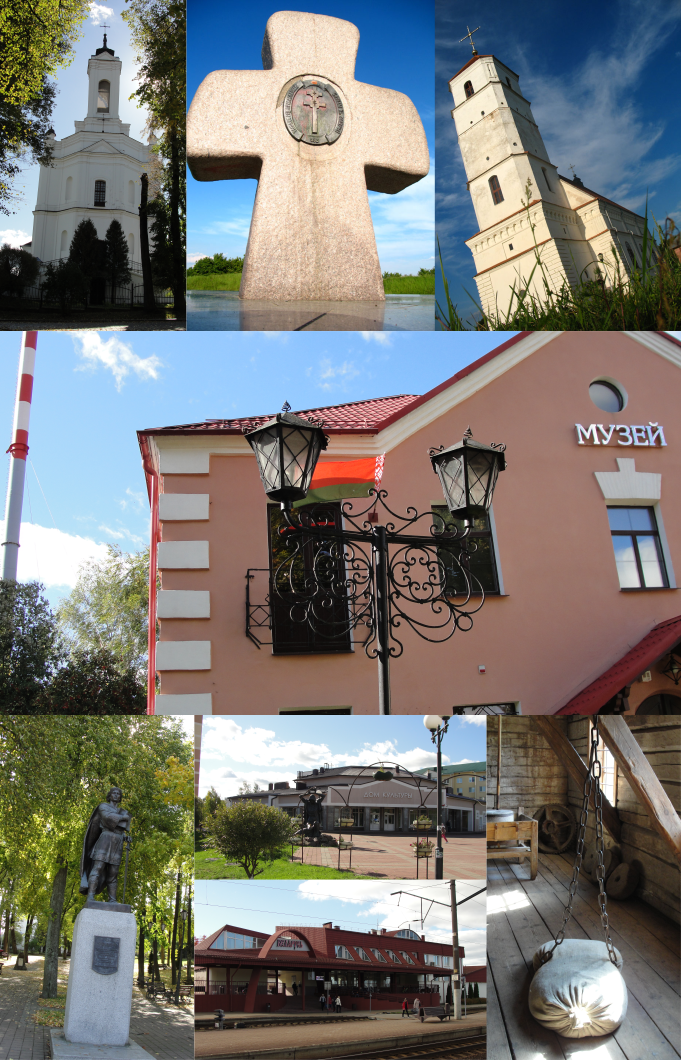

- Coat of arms

- Location within Belarus
- Coordinates: 54°00′30″N 27°17′05″E
- Country: Belarus
- Region: Minsk Region
- District: Minsk District
- Founded: 985

Area
  - Total: 14.2 km^{2} (5.5 sq mi)
- Elevation: 211 m (692 ft)

Population (2026)
  - Total: 17,166
  - Density: 1,210/km^{2} (3,130/sq mi)
- Time zone: UTC+3 (MSK)
- Postal code: 223034, 223036
- Area code: +375 17
- License plate: 5

Zaslawye or Zaslavl (Note: Belarusian: Заслаўе, romanized: Zaslaŭje, IPA: [zaˈsɫau̯je]; Russian: Заславль; Polish: Zasław; Lithuanian: Zaslavlis.) is a town in Minsk District, Minsk Region, Belarus. It is located 20 kilometres (12 mi) northwest of the capital Minsk. In 2009, its population was 14,400. As of 2026, it has a population of 17,116.

== History ==
According to chronicles, Zaslawye was founded in 985 by Vladimir the Great. He sent his wife Rogneda to live in Zaslawye with their son Iziaslav of Polotsk, the founder of the princely house of Polotsk. The town is mentioned in historical writings as Izyaslavl, which led to the current name, Zaslawye.

In the beginning of Middle Ages, the town was a centre of the Principality of Izyaslavl. In the 11th century, the town was heavily fortified. Much of the town's territory has been designated for archaeological preservation now. In the modern days, the town built its outdoor statue of Rogneda and Izyaslav.

During the period of Reformation, the town was a nest for followers of Calvinism and Socinianism.

The town became a part of the Minsk Governorate of the Russian Empire after the Second Partition of Poland in 1793. Soviet power was established in November 1917. German occupation lasted from February to December 1918. In 1919, the town became a part of the Byelorussian SSR. Polish occupation lasted from July 1919 to July 1920.

This district center was under German occupation from 28 June 1941 to 4 July 1944. In 1939, Jews comprised 9% of the town’s population, numbering 248 people. In October 1941, the Germans gathered 100 Jews from the town in a ghetto (a building formerly occupied by Soviet border guards). They were forbidden to go outside and didn’t receive food. The ghetto was surrounded by a fence and was supervised all day and night. On September 26 and 27, 1941, all Jewish men (at least 20 of them) were killed, 12 of whom were burned in the ghetto building. On September 29, around 100 Jews, mostly women, children, and elderly people, were taken on horse carts out of the ghetto under the pretext of future resettlement to Minsk. They were all shot in a pit in the forest near the village of Sloboda. For a month following the liquidation of the ghetto, 35 Jewish women were kept in one of the houses on Bazarnaya Street. They were used for different kinds of forced labor until they were all shot on October 29, 1941.

== Geography ==
Zaslawye is situated in north-western suburb of Minsk. It is part of its urban area and one of its main towns along with Fanipol and Machulishi. Considering that the Belarusian capital Minsk, a center of Minsk Raion, is administratively separated from Zaslawye, it is still the most populated settlement of the proper raion. Th town is located near the large Zaslawskaye reservoir, often called the Minsk sea.

== Sites ==
All historical attractions of Zaslawye are situated in the downtown not far from the Belarus Railway Station. The most interesting of them are the Zamechek Castle, which is an archaeological site of the Zaslawye town of the 10 – 12th centuries; the Val Site, which includes town ramparts and the fortified Savior Transfiguration Church (primary Calvinist church which was built from 1577 onward and is still in fair preservation); the Phara St Mary Church of the 18th century; a small skansen of a traditional wooden tavern, a blacksmith workshop, storehouse and steam mill.

== Notable people ==
- Symon Budny (1533–1593), humanist
