= Brahin, Belarus =

Brahin Брагін (Belarusian) Брагин (Russian)
- Urban-type settlement
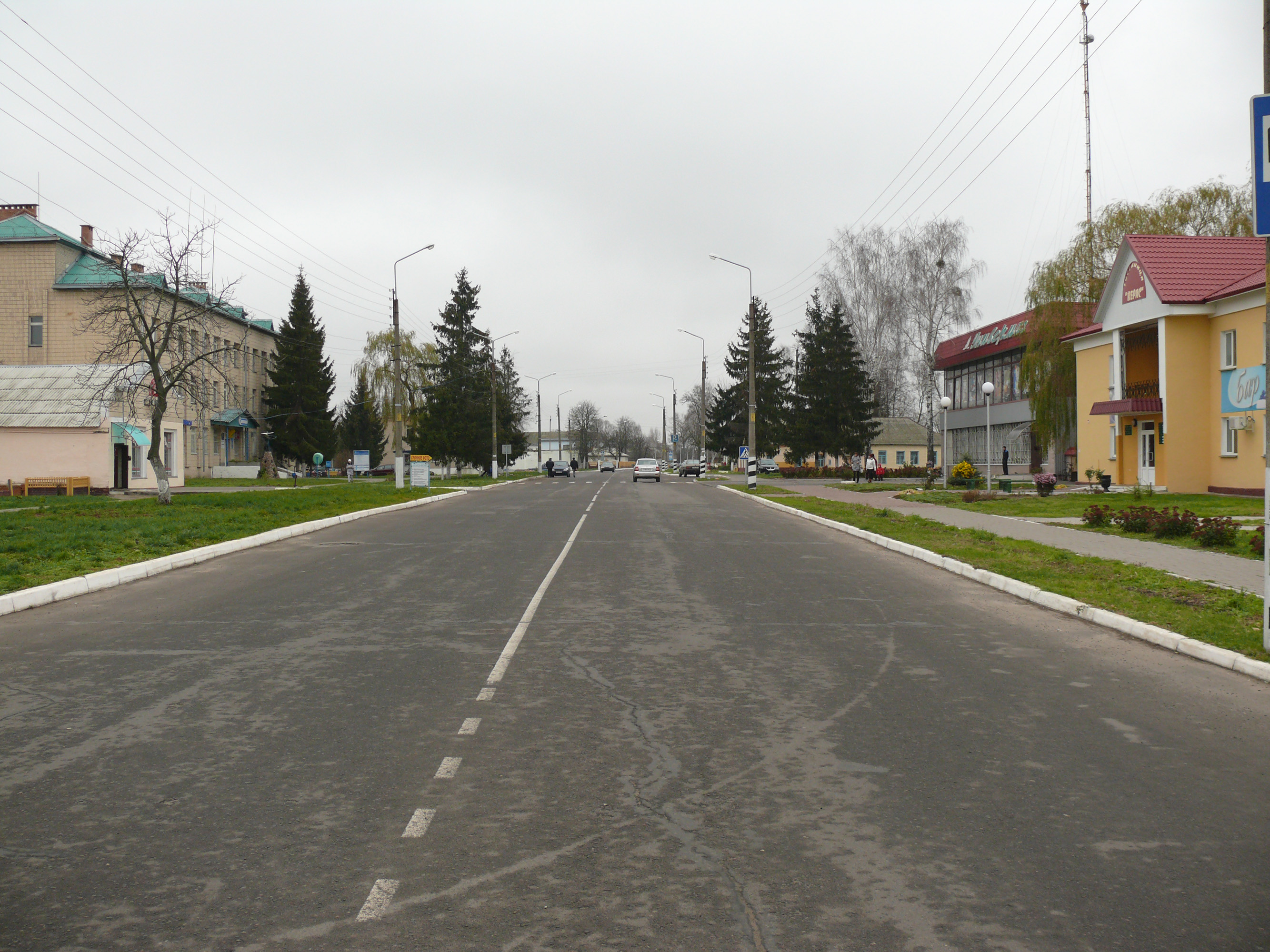

- Flag Coat of arms

- Location within Belarus
- Coordinates: 51°47′N 30°16′E
- Country: Belarus
- Region: Gomel Region
- District: Brahin District
- First mentioned: 1147

Population (2025)
  - Total: 4,579
- Time zone: UTC+3 (MSK)
- Postal code: 247630–247632
- Area code: +375 02344
- Website: Брагинский районный исполнительный комитет (in Russian) — Brahin Rajon Executive Committee.

Brahin, (Note: Belarusian: Брагін.) or Bragin, (Note: Russian: Брагин; Yiddish: בּראָהין, romanized: Brohin.) is an urban-type settlement in Gomel region, in south-eastern Belarus. It serves as the administrative center of Brahin district. It stands on the banks of the Brahinka River, 28 kilometres (17 mi) from the nearest railway (Khoiniki station). As of 2025, it has a population of 4,579.

== History ==
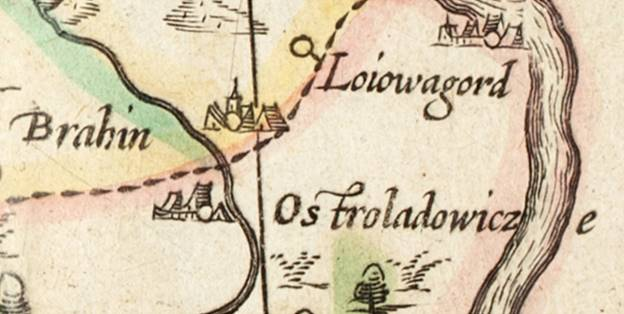
Brahin marked on a map from 1613

The settlement is first mentioned in the Hypatian Codex in 1147 as an important town in Kievan Rus'.

In 1511 Brahin was granted new privileges by King Sigismund I the Old. Since the late 16th century, it was a possession of the Wiśniowiecki family. It was administratively located in the Minsk Voivodeship of the Polish–Lithuanian Commonwealth.

A significant part of Brahin's population traditionally was of Jewish descent. By the end of 19th century, 2,254 of 4,311 inhabitants were Jewish.

During World War II, Brahin was under German occupation from 28 August 1941 to 23 November 1943. A Nazi prison was operated in the town. Many Jews in the area were killed by the German forces during that time:

On September 13, 1941, the Jews of Bragin were ordered to gather in a school for the purposes of selecting a monitor and his deputy, but when 300 Jews came at the indicated time the school they were surrounded by Germans and closed. After that, Jews were led out in groups to the edge of the village and shot.

As a result of the Chernobyl disaster, areas of the Brahin district were radioactively contaminated. 52 settlements were resettled, 9 of which are buried. From Brahin itself 1,651 families (4,892 people) were resettled.

== Climate ==
Climate data for Brahin (1991–2020)
Month	Jan	Feb	Mar	Apr	May	Jun	Jul	Aug	Sep	Oct	Nov	Dec	Year
Record high °C (°F)	5.2 (41.4)	7.2 (45.0)	14.9 (58.8)	23.5 (74.3)	27.9 (82.2)	30.9 (87.6)	32.2 (90.0)	32.4 (90.3)	27.3 (81.1)	22.1 (71.8)	13.1 (55.6)	7.0 (44.6)	32.4 (90.3)
Mean daily maximum °C (°F)	−1.4 (29.5)	0.0 (32.0)	5.9 (42.6)	14.6 (58.3)	20.6 (69.1)	24.1 (75.4)	26.0 (78.8)	25.2 (77.4)	19.3 (66.7)	12.2 (54.0)	4.6 (40.3)	−0.2 (31.6)	12.6 (54.7)
Mean daily minimum °C (°F)	−6.8 (19.8)	−6.6 (20.1)	−2.7 (27.1)	3.2 (37.8)	8.2 (46.8)	11.7 (53.1)	13.6 (56.5)	12.2 (54.0)	7.7 (45.9)	3.0 (37.4)	−0.8 (30.6)	−5.0 (23.0)	3.1 (37.6)
Record low °C (°F)	−20.4 (−4.7)	−19.1 (−2.4)	−11.6 (11.1)	−4.3 (24.3)	0.3 (32.5)	4.6 (40.3)	7.9 (46.2)	5.3 (41.5)	−0.3 (31.5)	−6.0 (21.2)	−10.9 (12.4)	−16.3 (2.7)	−20.4 (−4.7)
Average precipitation mm (inches)	31.5 (1.24)	30.6 (1.20)	34.3 (1.35)	30.9 (1.22)	55.9 (2.20)	59.9 (2.36)	69.1 (2.72)	57.6 (2.27)	50.8 (2.00)	51.5 (2.03)	38.5 (1.52)	38.3 (1.51)	548.9 (21.61)
Average precipitation days (≥ 1.0 mm)	7.9	8.1	8.2	6.0	8.6	8.4	8.7	7.3	6.6	8.0	7.6	9.1	94.5
Source: NOAA

== Notable residents ==
- Siarhiej Palujan (1890–1910), Belarusian writer and publicist
