= Alaksandar Ułasaŭ =

Belarusian journalist (1874–1941)

- Аляксандар Уласаў
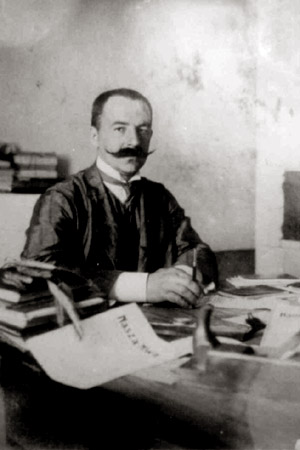
- Alaksandar Ułasaŭ

Member of the Rada of the Belarusian Democratic Republic

Personal details
- Born: 28 August 1874; Vilejka, now a town in Minsk Region
- Died: 11 March 1941

Alaksandar Ułasaŭ (Belarusian: Аляксандар Уласаў; 28 August 1874 – 11 March 1941) was a Belarusian politician, a founder and the first editor of the newspaper Naša Niva, and a victim of Soviet repressions.

== Early years ==
Ułasaŭ was born in Vilejka, now a town in Minsk Region.

He studied at a theological seminary in Pinsk, a gymnasium in Libava (now Liepāja, Latvia) and later at the Riga Technical University.

== Belarusian National Movement ==
In December 1904, Ułasaŭ became one of the founders of the Belarusian Socialist Assembly and a member of its central committee. During the 1905 Russian Revolution, Ułasaŭ organised workers' strikes in various Belarusian cities, participated in an illegal teachers' convention.

From December 1906 to May 1914, Ułasaŭ was the editor-in-chief of the newspaper Naša Niva and in that role encouraged talented Belarusian writers (such as Janka Kupała) to contribute to the newspaper. For his social and political activities and publications Ułasaŭ was sentenced by the Russian authorities to 4 months of imprisonment in 1909.

In December 1917, Ułasaŭ took part in the First All-Belarusian Congress and in 1918, became a member of the Rada of the Belarusian Democratic Republic.

== In the Second Polish Republic ==
At the time of the conclusion of the Polish-Russian Treaty of Riga in 1920, Ułasaŭ lived in Radaškovičy, which ended up in the territory of the Second Polish Republic. He was repeatedly arrested by the Polish authorities for his Belarusian cultural and political activities. Later, in Radaškovičy, Ułasaŭ established a Belarusian gymnasium named after Francis Skaryna.

In 1921, he was one of the founders of the Association of Belarusian Schools – a public organisation that supported Belarusian education in Western Belarus.

In 1922–1927, Ułasaŭ was a senator in the Polish Senate elected from the list of national minorities. He took part in the work of the Belarusian Peasant-Worker Society.

== Arrest and death ==
After the partition of the Second Polish Republic between Nazi Germany and the Soviet Union, Ułasaŭ was arrested by the Soviet NKVD secret police and transported to Minsk.

In November 1940, he was sentenced to 5 years in the GULAG concentration camps for "espionage-provocateur activities".

In March 1941, he died either in prison in Russia, in the territory of the current Kemerovo region, or during transfer between places of detention.
