= Andrej Skurko =

Belarusian journalist

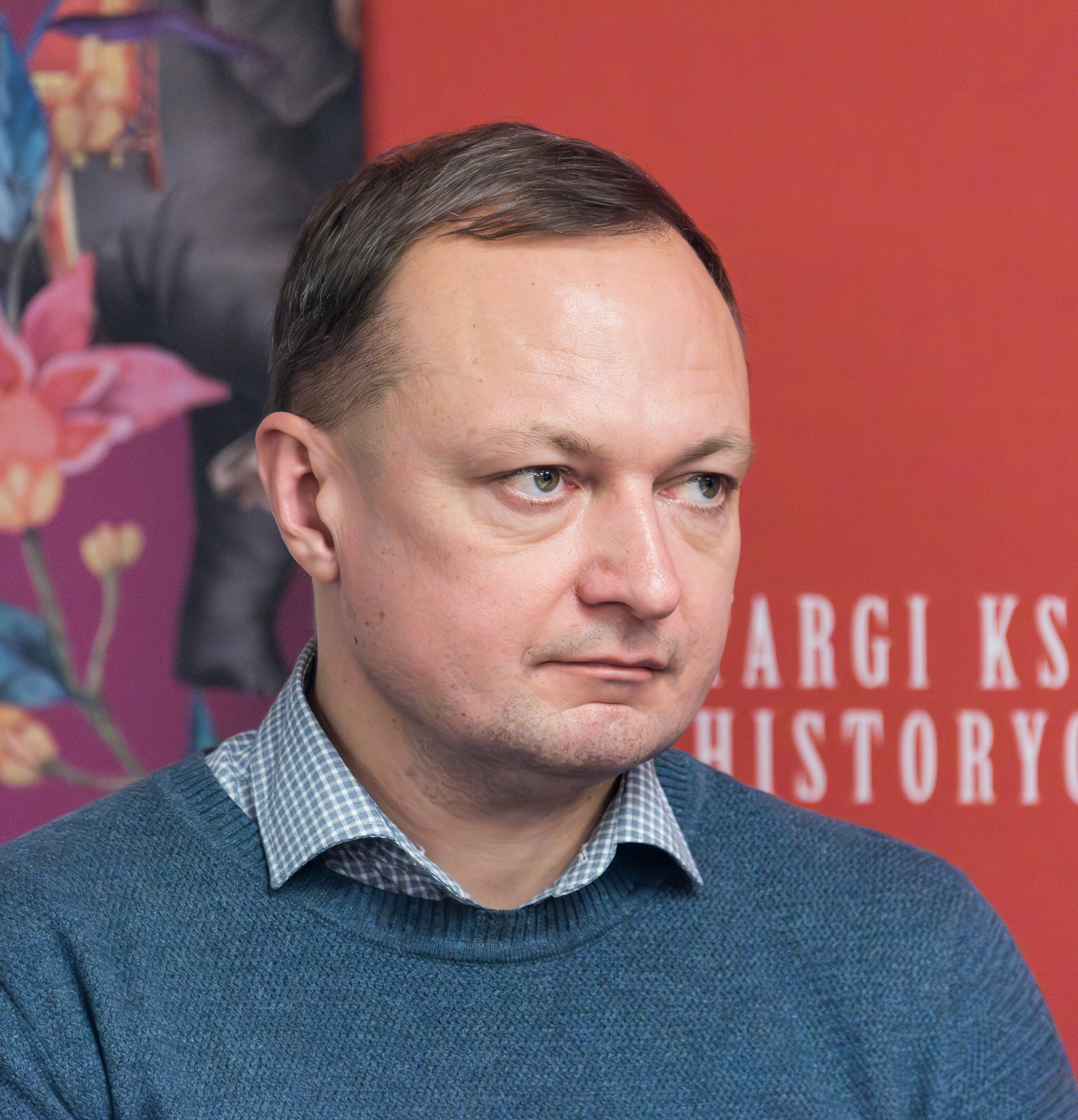
- Born: Андрей Геннадьевич Скурко; March 12, 1978 (age 48)
- Occupation: Journalist

Andrej Skurko is a Belarusian journalist, chief editor of "Nasha Niva" newspaper in 2006–2017. In July 2021 he was arrested for alleged debts of the newspaper to the state electric company. On March 15, 2022, he was sentenced to 2.5 years in prison. Human rights activists recognized him as a political prisoner.

== Biography ==
=== Career ===
Andrej graduated from the BSU Philological faculty, he wrote to "Nasha Niva" since 1998. In 2000 he became vice chief editor. In 2006 he was elected vice chairman of the Belarusian PEN-centre, where he stayed until 2019. Also since December 1, 2006, he was the chief editor of "Nasha Niva" and stayed at this post for 11 years, the longest term among other NN chief editors. In 2017 he was succeeded by Yahor Martsinovich and became the head of the marketing and advertising departments.

Skurko has a wife Paulina and a son.

=== Arrest ===
In 2021 he headed the advertising and marketing department at Nashs Niva. Together with the current editor-in-chief Yahor Martsinovich and journalist, head of NN publications ‘Nasha Historyja’ and ‘Arche’ Andrej Dyńko, Skurko was detained on July 8, 2021. He was charged under part 2 of Art.216 of the Belarusian Criminal Code for alleged NN debts to the "Minenergo" company. According to the police, the NN failed to pay utility bills for 4 years and damaged the company by 3500 thousand Belarusian roubles. Skurko should have been released on July 16, 2021, but he was charged under another article of Criminal Code for alleged causing of mass disorders. The Viasna Human Rights Centre, the Belarusian Helsinki Committee, the Belarusian Association of Journalists, and other human rights organizations recognized him as a political prisoner.

At the end of July, Skurko developed symptoms of COVID-19, and his health deteriorated. The Belarusian Association of Journalists filed a request to transfer him into civilian hospital because he is an insulin-dependent diabetic who are most vulnerable to COVID-19. After the BAJ request the MVD stated that Skurko was moved to the prison's medical unit and received proper care.

As of October 14, 2021, Skurko was still in the detention centre without any new information regarding his case.

On March 15, 2022, Marcinovič and Skurko were sentenced to 2.5 years in prison for estimated material damage of 10,000 Belarusian rubles ($3000). According to the investigators, in May 2017 they opened offices in Skurko's apartment but kept paying for electricity as individuals, while Belarusian law obliges legal persons to pay increased rates.

Skurko was released on August 18, 2023, having fully served the 2 1/2 years of his sentence. In prison, he wrote a book of poetry for children that was published in 2022 and translated Korney Chukovsky's Doctor Aybolit into Belarusian language.
