= Sosienka =

Former Scots pine in Racibórz, Poland

- Interactive map of Sosienka
- Location: Racibórz, Poland
- Coordinates: 50°04′43.85″N 18°16′05.98″E
- Type: natural monument, Scotch pine
- Height: 13 m (43 ft)
- Inauguration date: 7 August 1963

Sosienka was a solitary Scotch pine that grew on Sosienka Hill in the Brzezie district of Racibórz, Poland. Designated a natural monument in 1963, it was vandalized and set on fire in early 2000, leading to its felling by the fire department. Estimated to have lived nearly 200 years, Sosienka was a symbol of Brzezie, featured on the seal of the former Gmina Brzezie in the early 20th century, as well as local organizational emblems. The tree inspired the naming of the hill, surrounding area, and a nearby street, Sosienkowa Street.

== History ==
The pine took root in the barren, sandy soil of Sosienka Hill, 252 metres above sea level, in the early 19th century. Standing alone, it became a feature in the landscape of Brzezie, then an independent village until its incorporation into Racibórz in 1975. Over time, it gained reverence as a symbol of the community. Its image appeared on the early 20th-century seal of Gmina Brzezie, as well as emblems of the local Volunteer Fire Department, the "Falcon" Polish Gymnastic Society, and a school badge used by the local primary school. The name "Sosienka" extended to the hill, the surrounding area, and Sosienkowa Street.

On 7 August 1963, the tree was registered as a natural monument by the Voivodeship Nature Conservator in Katowice. At the time, it had a diameter at breast height of 188 cm, a height of 13 metres, and an estimated age of 150 years. Until 2008, it was Racibórz's only coniferous natural monument, until two yews on Sudecka Street were similarly designated by a Racibórz City Council resolution on 26 November 2008. Sosienka was frequently mentioned in late 20th-century naturalist and regional literature, including Innocenty Libura's 1984 book Z dziejów domowych powiatu: gawęda o ziemi rybnickiej (From the Domestic History of the County: Tales of the Rybnik Land).

The tree's growth in girth slowed significantly, leading locals to remark that it appeared unchanged over time. In the 1970s, it began to decline, likely due to root damage from gravel extraction. It stood on the hill until the late 20th century. A photograph of Sosienka appeared on the cover of Beata Kuliś's 1998 book Racibórz – Brzezie, topografia legendowa (Racibórz – Brzezie, Legendary Topography). In 1999, Racibórz resident Adam Rokosz won first place in the National Exhibition of Children and Youth Photography in Białystok with a photo of the tree. In early 2000, vandals set fire to its hollow trunk, which, saturated with resin, burned readily. Firefighters, likely unaware of its significance, felled the tree. A tribute by Jan Duda, a local nature expert, appeared in the Brzezie parish newspaper Brzeski Parafianin on 8 March 2000.

In 1993, while Sosienka still stood, an elderly Brzezie resident planted a young pine nearby, which they tended and which survives today. During Sosienka's decline, a hollow dug beneath its roots revealed a large, damaged stone bearing a faded date and indistinct mark or initials.

== Legends ==
Several legends surrounded Sosienka. The most prominent told of a castle once atop the hill, whose hedonistic occupants mocked a procession of villagers carrying the Blessed Sacrament. Soon after, the castle sank into the earth, and a pine sprouted in its place, symbolizing divine punishment for sin and debauchery. Variations include a boarding house or monastery instead of a castle. Another version described three princesses living in the castle—two wicked and indulgent, one pious and virtuous. During a religious festival, the two wayward sisters held a lavish party, ignoring their sister's pleas. The castle collapsed, and three pines emerged. When locals later attempted to fell them, the first two were cut without issue, but the third bled and spoke, "You did not plant, so do not uproot", prompting the villagers to spare it.

A prophecy also claimed that Brzezie would cease to exist when Sosienka withered. This was later linked to the 1970s, when the tree began to die, coinciding with Brzezie's annexation into Racibórz, ending its status as an independent village.

== Bibliography ==
- Kuliś, Beata (1998). Racibórz – Brzezie, topografia legendowa [Racibórz – Brzezie, Legendary Topography] (in Polish). Racibórz: Arnet. ISBN 83-909930-0-7.
