= Nasha Niva =

Belarusian weekly newspaper

Наша Ніва Nasha Niva
- Type: Weekly newspaper
- Owner: VPUP Surodzichy
- Editor: Jahor Marcinovič
- Founded: 1906
- Language: Belarusian (Taraškievica before 2008)
- Circulation: over 6,000
- Website: nashaniva.com

Nasha Niva (Belarusian: Наша Ніва, romanized: Naša Niva, lit. "Our field") is one of the oldest Belarusian weekly newspapers, founded in 1906 and re-established in 1991. Nasha Niva became a cultural symbol, due to the newspaper's importance as a publisher of Belarusian literature and as a pioneer of Belarusian language journalism, the years before the October Revolution are often referred to as the 'Nasha Niva Period'.

In the period between 1906 and 1915 the newspaper was published on a weekly basis. From 1991 to 1995 it appeared once a month, reverting to weekly publication in 1996 and then fortnightly in 1997–1999. In 1999 the paper became a weekly again.

According to Media IQ estimation, Nasha Niva remains free of state propaganda and keeps one of the highest ratings in journalism ethics among Belarusian media. Being in open opposition to Alexander Lukashenko's regime, the newspaper was cracked down by the government numerous times, received huge fines and was excluded from state circulation. The editors and journalists were arrested, questioned and beaten by the police and KGB officers.

As of 2020 the editor-in-chief is Jahor Marcinovič, who succeeded Andrej Dyńko.

On July 8, 2021, the newspaper's website was blocked by the authorities. The editor-in-chief Jahor Marcinovič and editor Andrej Skurko were detained, their homes and the office being searched. On July 13 the publication announced its closure in Belarus due to growing pressure from the authorities. The employees were advised to move abroad. The editor's office claimed that they would try to re-launch the newspaper outside Belarus. The new website was launched on July 29, 2021; the content was uploaded from the publication's social networks and Telegram channel.

On January 27, 2022, the Ministry of Internal Affairs of Belarus declared Nasha Niva 'an extremist formation'. On March 15, 2022, Marcinovič and Skurko were sentenced to 2.5 years in prison for estimated material damage of 10,000 Belarusian rubles ($3000).

On August 15, 2022, Nasha Niva launched a Ukrainian-language Telegram channel, so that Ukrainians could obtain independent and objective information from Belarus.

On the occasion of the International Mother Language Day (February 21) in 2023, a machine-converted website edition of Nasha Niva in Łacinka (that is, the Belarusian Latin alphabet) was launched.

== History ==
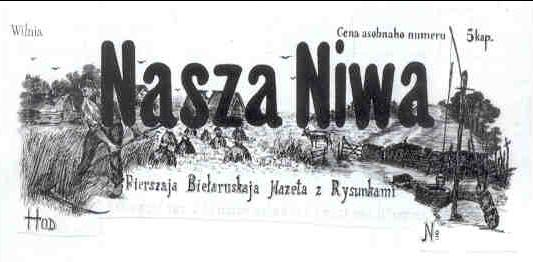
"Nasha Niva" logo in the early 20th century (written in the Belarusian Latin alphabet)

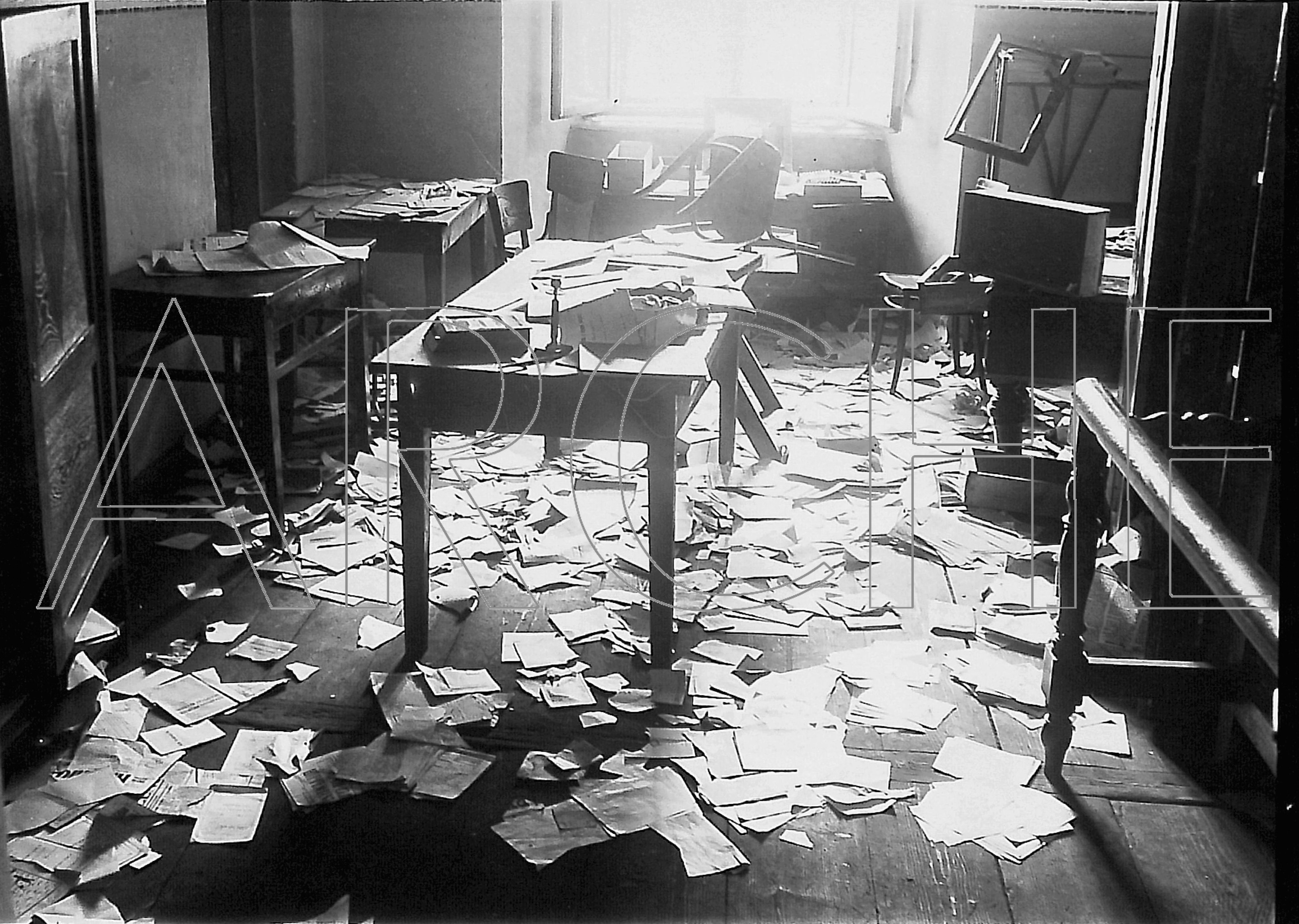
Editor's office after police search, 1910s

=== 1906–1915 ===
Nasha Niva was inspired by Iskra, a political newspaper, published by the RSDLP since 1901. At the BSA conference in June 1906 Belarusian journalist Anton Łuckevič announced his intention to create a party newspaper. The co-founders were his brother Ivan and Alaksandar Ułasaŭ, a landowner from the Mihaŭka estate near Minsk, who was for many years the newspaper's publisher and editor. The name for the publication was taken from a poem by Janka Lučyna "Роднай старонцы" ("To Fatherland"). The first issue was published on 23 November 1906, under the editorship of titular counselor Zigmund Volsky. Since the fifth issue from 8 December 1906, the chief editor was Alaksandar Ułasaŭ.

In the first three years, the newspaper published 960 reports from 489 areas, 246 poems by 61 authors, and 91 articles by 36 special reporters. Only in 1910 "Nasha Niva" published 666 various correspondence from 427 people. "Nasha Niva" covered a wide range of political, economic, and cultural issues. Every issue included the following sections: government actions, political review, life of the countryside, life of the city, feuilletons, the newest literary works in Belarusian, correspondence, news from Russia and Lithuania, book digest, history notes, notes on agriculture, applied mechanics, personal ad.

The newspaper saw as its main task the consolidation of a Belarusian political nation. It was also – as was observed at the time – the first source of information to be free of government interference. The editors office also strived to preserve and promote Belarusian culture. National civil society rallied around the newspaper; numerous agricultural initiatives, youth groups and publishing houses used it as a voice to promote their activities. In 1911 its circulation was about 3,000. Up to October 1912, the newspaper was printed both in Cyrillic and Latin scripts. From the 43 issue of 24 October 1912, the publication completely switched to the Cyrillic alphabet. A subscription for a year cost 5 roubles, the price for one issue was 5 kopecks.

The newspaper's defence of national interests provoked attacks by the Russian censorship throughout its existence. Even a discussion on agrarian topics organised in 1907 – including an article entitled 'The Land Question in New Zealand' – was found 'seditious' and 'disrespectful of the government'. The editor, Alaksandar Ułasaŭ, was tried and imprisoned. On several occasions, the entire run of a particular issue was confiscated and the editors were compelled to pay fines.

==== Editors office ====
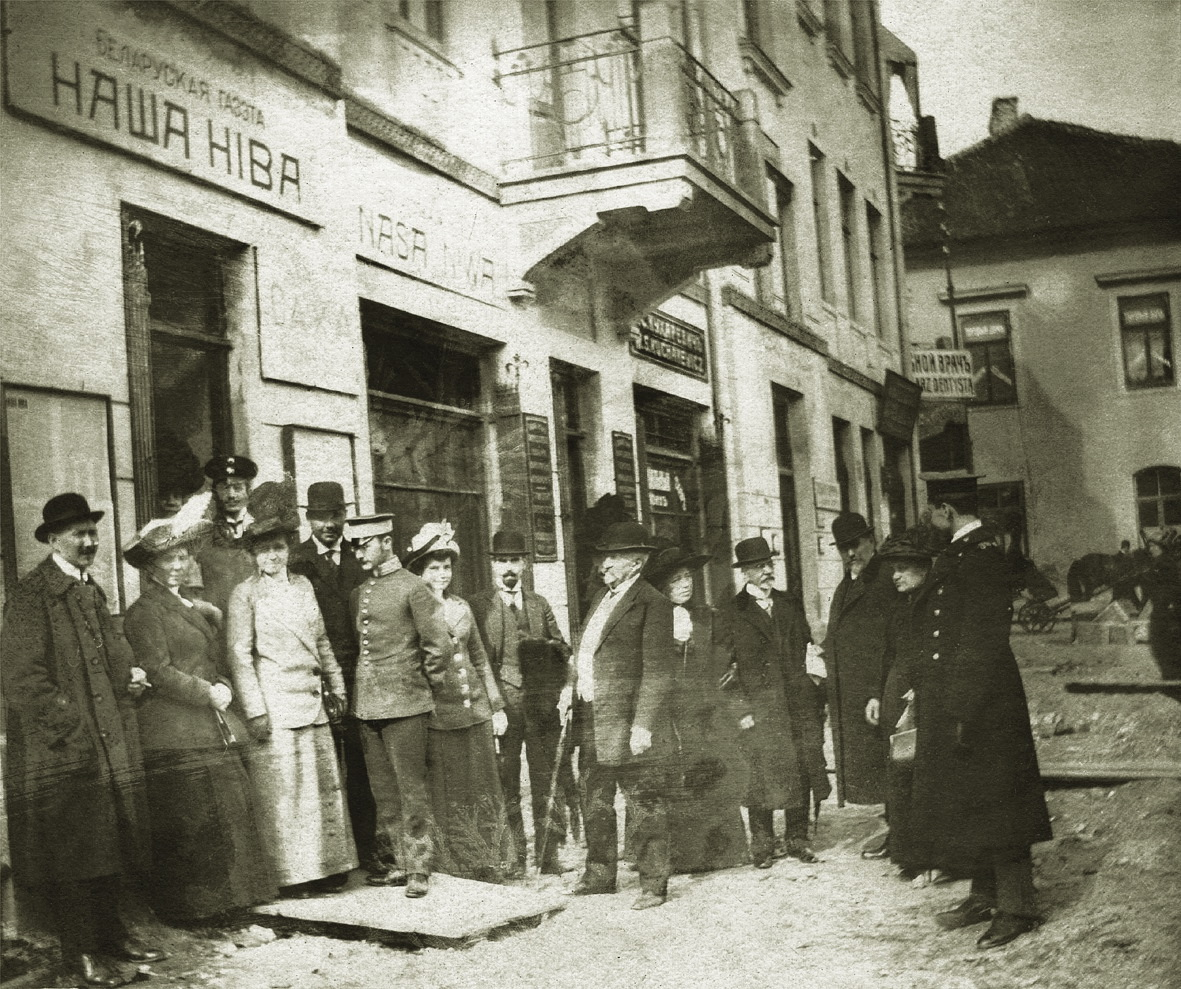
Editors office, 1907

Subscribers and correspondents of the newspaper became central figures of national political and intellectual life, e.g. Ciška Hartny (pseudonym of Źmicier Žyłunovič), one of the first leaders of the Belarusian Soviet Socialist Republic, or Branisłaŭ Taraškievič, political leader in the Western Belarus and author of the first printed grammar of the Belarusian language.

One of the major figures behind the formulation of the newspaper's political goals was Ivan Łuckevič from Minsk, founder of the famous Belarusian Museum in Vilnius and sponsor of numerous political and cultural projects. Working alongside him was his brother, Anton Łuckevič, whose ideas were decisive in the formation of the programme of the Belarusian Socialist Party (Hramada). He would eventually become the Prime Minister of the Belarusian People's Republic. Vacłaŭ Łastoŭski, another future Prime Minister of the Belarusian People's Republic, became secretary of the newspaper in 1909 and in the years 1912—1913 acted as its de facto editor. He was in charge of the historical agenda, which was one of the main topics in Nasha Niva. Janka Kupała, a famous poet, became the newspaper's editor in March 1914. The editors office located on Wileńska street, 14. Kupała continued in this role until the Autumn of 1915 when Vilnius was occupied by the Germans and normal life in Belarus came to a standstill.

By early 1909 the editors office included six permanent employees – Łuckevič brothers, Alaksandar Ułasaŭ, Vacłaŭ Łastoŭski, Janka Kupała and Jadvihin Š. In the Summer of 1909 they were joined by Siarhiej Pałujan. However, the group was divided into two parts. Łuckevič brothers and Ułasaŭ were the so-called 'Upper House of Parliament', they used the separated room and communicated to others by notes that were put through a slot under the door. The 'Upper Parliament' strived to keep the publication alive and receive fees, while the 'Lower Chamber' performed all the everyday tasks. Their articles were published under pseudonyms, all their decisions could be overridden by the 'Upper House' veto. The tense relations between the collaborators are presumably the main reason of Siarhiej Pałujan's suicide in 1910. According to the archives, in 1909 the newspaper had subscribers even in Prague, Paris, Lviv and USA.

Anton Łuckevič, Alaksandar Ułasaŭ, Branisłaŭ Taraškievič, Źmicier Žyłunovič and Vacłaŭ Łastoŭski all fell victims of the Soviet repressions in the 1930s.

==== Belarusian Language ====
The first issue of the newspaper, 1906

According to some research, in the early 20th century the Belarusian language was mostly used by the peasantry and neglected by intelligence and upper classes. "Nasha Niva" introduced standards of usage into the Belarusian literary language. It was actively involved in both the creation of classical Belarusian literature and the evolution of the idea of Belarusian statehood. One of the newspaper's characteristic features was the strong interactive relationship that it built with readers. There were more than three thousand permanent and temporary correspondents who submitted information to the editor. A large number of contributors from various regions of Belarus were involved in the publication of both journalistic pieces and literary works. This provided a unique opportunity to re-establish the literary language by establishing norms of usage that were the most widespread throughout the country as a whole. The newspaper thereby played an invaluable role in fixing the orthography, grammar and word-formation patterns of the modern Belarusian language. Jakub Kołas, a classic of Belarusian literature, was an active contributor to "Nasha Niva". It was also "Nasha Niva" that discovered the works of Maksim Bahdanovič and Źmitrok Biadula. It published the writings of many prominent intellectual figures, including Janka Kupała, Anton Łuckevič, Maksim Bahdanovič and Vacłaŭ Łastoŭski.

Nasha Niva realised the unpopularity of the Belarusian language among rural populations. As the main step to improve the issue it promoted education in Belarusian and advocated people's right to use their native language in schools and in church.

Issues from 1906 to 1912 used both Cyrillic and Latin alphabets simultaneously (with the subheading: Printed weekly in Russian and in Polish letters (in Latin script: Wychodzić szto tydzień ruskimi i polskimi literami)).

==== Publishing ====
The newspaper became the centre of intellectual life, it acted as the focal point for the independent cultural and social projects that grew up around it. Since 1907 the editors office has been engaged in book publishing. "Nasha Niva" performed the coordinating function of a publishing centre. Especially popular were the annual Belarusian Calendars, almanacs in which readers could find not only the usual kind of day-to-day information but also literary works. The publishing centre also published books, both original and in translation. A satirical magazine 'Krapiva' (Nettles) was published in Vilnia in 1912, and the agricultural department of Nasha Niva grew into the independent 'Sacha' (Wooden Plough) magazine published in Minsk from the end of 1913.

Under the newspaper's auspices one of "Nasha Niva" founders, Ivan Łuckevič, began to collect artefacts for the future Belarusian National Museum. Most of it is currently stored in the National History Museum of Lithuania. Staff of the newspaper helped Ihnat Bujnicki form the first Belarusian theatre company. More than 1 mln copies of the newspaper were published between 1906 and 1915. The scale of the work accomplished by "Nasha Niva" has allowed historians and researchers of culture to define early 20th century Belarusian culture as the 'Nasha Niva period' when referring to the quantitative and qualitative changes in the development of modern culture and society.

=== First World War ===
In 1914 Nasha Niva could no longer criticize the government that was at war because such opposition could be perceived as unloyalty to the state. The newspaper published articles and reports on patriotic actions of ordinary Belarusians, but its editorial position didn't demonstrate any support to the Russian military. The Russian army was described as alien as the German one.

With the outbreak of war Nasha Niva issues halved in volume. Since the Autumn of 1914, the blank spaces appeared on its pages, left by the state censors. The last issue was published in the Summer of 1915 when the majority of the staff were called to active military service.

== Revival attempt in 1920 ==
The first attempt to revive the newspaper was made by Maksim Harecki in Vilnia in 1920. The first issue of the revived Nasha Niva, now described as a socio-political and literature daily newspaper, appeared on 28 October 1920, soon after the beginning of Żeligowski's Mutiny. From the 4th issue, the editor-in-chief was Viačasłaŭ Znamiaroǔski. In December 1920 the newspaper was banned again, this time by the Polish military censorship.

== 1991 revival in Vilnius ==
The dissolution of the Soviet Union and the rapid growth of the independence movement in Belarus made it possible for the newspaper to be re-established. The publication of Nasha Niva was relaunched by journalist Siarhiej Dubaviec in Vilnius in May 1991.

The revived newspaper came to occupy a special place among other Belarusian periodicals. "Nasha Niva" abandoned the 'defensive strategy' and self-imposed isolation inherent to much of the Belarusian-language media of the Soviet times. The newspaper opened its pages to discussions on universal topics and published numerous translations of foreign literature. The paper discussed two topics in particular: the heritage of the Grand Duchy of Lithuania and a possible model of relations between Belarus and other nations of the region. In 2000 Siarhiej Dubaviec resigned, Andrej Dyńko became the new editor-in-chief.

In 1996, the newspaper's editorial office relocated to Minsk, Belarus. The topics covered by "Nasha Niva" shifted from literature and culture towards political and social issues. In 1999 the newspaper became a weekly once more. In 2002 the volume increased from 12 to 16 pages weekly, and in 2005 to 24. At its peak the print run reached 8,000. Following pressure from the state and denial of access to the national press distribution system, "Nasha Niva" changed to a pocket format and increased the number of pages to 48. The circulation decreased to 2,200 copies.

In 2006 "Nasha Niva" decided to expand its online version, Andrej Skurko headed the web department, Andrej Dyńko became the new chief of the paper edition. In the 1990s work began on the production of a facsimile edition of the issues of the newspaper that appeared in the years between 1906 and 1915. At the same time material has been collected for the compilation of a dictionary of the language used in those early years of "Nasha Niva".

On July 31, 2023, the European Parliament passed a resolution in which it asks the European Commission and the Member States, to strengthen Belarusian media outlets, including Nasha Niva.

== State pressure ==
Since 1995 and especially in the 2000s, "Nasha Niva" has faced pressure from the authoritarian regime of Alexander Lukashenko. The paper was persecuted for using the traditional Belarusian orthography (Taraškievica). In 1998 the newspaper won a trial in court and got permission to continue using the classical orthography. "Nasha Niva" used the classical spelling until 2008; it then shifted to the spelling taught in schools in order to 'improve communication between intellectuals and the public', as an editorial on the topic made clear at the time.

In 2005 the authorities banned distribution of the newspaper through the Belarusian postal system and the official distribution agency which delivered the paper to shops and newsstands. The circulation dropped from 3500 to 2000 copies. Only in 2006 the publication received four official warnings for not indicating the legal address. In fact, four different leaseholders broke the contracts with the editors office without any notification or explanation as soon as "Nasha Niva" notified the Information Ministry about their agreements.

Between 2006 and 2008 the newspaper had to be distributed by volunteers. For this reason, the newspaper switched to A4 format, so it would be easier to put into bags and envelopes.

"Nasha Niva" has been tried in court and fined on many occasions, with the KGB conducting searches both in the newspaper's office and the journalists personally. In 2006 the newspaper's Chief Editor, Andrej Dyńko was arrested and spent 10 days in prison. After his arrest Minsk authorities issued an official statement that the distribution of Nasha Niva in the city 'was inappropriate'. On 29 April 2006, 300 activists organized a rally in support of Nasha Niva at the Oktyabrskaya square, 10 people were arrested. In March 2008 the police attacked and arrested journalists Syamyon Pechanko and Andrei Lyankevich, while they were reporting from a rally in Minsk. Pechanko was accused for organization of the rally and received 15 days in prison.

In 2008 the Belarusian government took a course on the liberalization of the media, following requirements of European Union. At the end of 2008 "Nasha Niva" and "Narodnaya Volya" were allowed back to the state subscription and retail via newsstands. Soon "Nasha Niva" switched from bw to colour print, its circulation grew to 6000. However, as soon as in 2010 almost half of the July print run was confiscated and destroyed by the government. The censored issue had an article on Russian NTV documentary 'The Godfather' about Alexander Lukashenko which was considered a 'propaganda strike' against the Belarusian president. In December 2010 the editors office was searched by the KGB, all office equipment had been confiscated. The searches were also done in Andrej Skurko apartment.

=== 2010s ===
By 2010 the web-portal Nasha Niva became the most popular internet resource in the Belarusian language. According to statistics drawn up by Google Analytics, in 2017 monthly visitors of NN.by exceeded 600,000, more than 7,000,000 pages were viewed. Approximately 84% of the visits were from Belarus, 49% are from Minsk.

In 2011, Źmicier Pankaviec was appointed editor of the weekly paper edition. "Nasha Niva" had circulation around 8000, 50% were distributed by subscription. On 11 April 2011, the terrorist bombing took place at a Minsk Underground. "Nasha Niva" covered the events and the aftermath. Later the publication was accused of making false statements by the Information Ministry. The editors office, private apartments of the staff were searched, the journalists were questioned the general prosecutor's office, and the Belarusian security service, known as the KGB. "Nasha Niva" wrote that one of the victims was left in the station up to late evening, the authorities considered that information to be false and compromising. On 27 April 2011, the Ministry of Information instituted legal proceedings to close "Nasha Niva" and Narodnaya Volya newspapers. The International resonance forces the authorities to close the cases in early June. The Ministry initiated claims on administrative offences against the newspapers, both investigations ended with 14 mln Belarusian roubles fines to the publications. According to BAJ deputy director Andrej Bastuniec, since 2012 the situation with freedom of speech and media in Belarus stagnated on a very low level.

In 2012 Andrej Dyńko was banned from travelling abroad, only after six formal complaints to the authorities he was excluded from the blacklist.

In 2017 "Nasha Niva" became the third among most popular media in Belarus and launched Nasha Nina web project for female audiences (the title is based on a wordplay – Nina is a female name). On 1 March 2017, chief editor Andrej Skurko resigned, his position was taken by Jahor Marcinovič. Skurko remained deputy editor-in-chief. By 2018, the editors office included 12 journalists. Nasha Niva on paper was published monthly in 3000 print runs. The price of one newspaper was 2.5 Belarusian roubles.

=== 2020s ===
The newspaper extensively covered the months of nationwide protests after the 2020 Belarusian presidential election. On July 8, 2021, the newspaper's website was blocked by the authorities. The editor-in-chief Yahor Martsinovich and editor Andrey Skurko were detained, their homes and the office were searched. Martsinovich was beaten during the arrest, he suffered head injury. In a few days, Martsinovich and Skurko were charged in a criminal case on July 14. In jail Skurko, who has achrestic diabetes, was left without medication for 13 days. There he came in contact with SARS-CoV-2 and was diagnosed with COVID-19.

In November 2021, Nasha Niva's Telegram channel and its social networks were declared extremist materials. In January 2022, the KGB declared Nasha Niva an extremist formation. Creation of an extremist formation or participation in it is a criminal offence in Belarus.

== Online newspaper ==
On 11 May 2016, the editors office announced that Nasha Niva will concentrate on the Internet version, while the paper one will keep publishing on a monthly basis. However, the fundraising to support the paper edition didn't succeed. On 6 June 2018, the editors office announced the closure of paper runs and complete transfer to the web. According to "Nasha Niva" statistics, in May 2018 its web portal was visited by 475,000 unique users, 7.1 mln of pages were read. The audience mostly consisted of people of age 25–35, 60% of NN.by visitors were male.

In February 2018 the website was attacked by bots, in March 2019 "Nasha Niva" social media accounts were attacked from Belarusian IP address. In June 2020 "Nasha Niva" lost its domain name nn.by to the delay in payment. According to the state's law, the unpaid domains go up for auction on the next day after payment expiry. The newspaper continued operating at Nashaniva.by web address. The original domain was restored on 30 June 2020.

Like many other independent media websites, NN.by was shut down on 8 August 2020, when the presidential elections in Belarus took place. During the anti-Lukashenko riots in Minsk "Nasha Niva" journalist Natalla Łubnieǔskaja was shot with a rubber bullet by the police. Jahor Marcinovič was arrested on 11 August on his way home from the protests rally in Minsk. During the questioning he was severely beaten by law enforcement officers.

As of September 9, 2021, Yahor Martsinovich was imprisoned and faced criminal charges under the article 216 part 2 (Asset Damage without Stealing). On January 27, 2022, Nasha Niva was declared 'an extremist formation' by the state Ministry of Internal Affairs. On March 15, 2022, Marcinovič and Skurko were sentenced to 2.5 years in prison for estimated material damage of 10,000 Belarusian rubles ($3000). According to the investigators, in May 2017 they opened offices in Skurko's apartment but kept paying for electricity as individuals, while Belarusian law obliges legal persons to pay increased rates.

== Editors in chief ==
- Alaksandar Ułasaŭ (founder, editor in 1906–1912);
- Vacłaŭ Łastoŭski (1912–1913);
- Janka Kupała (1914–1915);
- Siarhiej Dubaviec (1991–1999);
- Andrej Dyńko (2000–2006);
- Andrej Skurko (2006–2017);
- Jahor Marcinovič (Martsinovich), recipient of the national award for investigative journalism several years in succession, became chief editor in 2017.

== Awards ==
- Chief editor Andrej Dyńko received International Award "Freedom of Speech" and Lorenzo Natali Prize in 2006;
- Gerd Bucerius Press Prize (2007)
- I Love Belarus (2010)
- Andrej Dyńko got first prize in 'Belarus in Focus' journalist contest (2013);.
- Egor Martinovich received 'Press Freedom' award by Reporters Without Borders (2015);
- Egor Martinovich and Dmitry Pankaviec received BAJ 'Volnaye Slova' Award (2015);
- Natallia Lubneuskaya got the Free Media Award (2021).

== Gallery ==
1906 №2

1907 №23

1908 №21

1909 №11

1909 №12

1909 №40

1909 №6&7

== Sources ==
- "Media in Belarus, 2011" (PDF). Minsk: BAJ. 2012. Archived from the original (PDF) on 27 November 2020.
- "Media Landscapes of Eastern Partnership Counties" (PDF). Yerevan Press Club (in Russian). Yerevan: Civil Society Forum: 56. 2011. Archived from the original (PDF) on 24 January 2021.
- Belyatsky, A.; Labkovich, V. (2006). "Human Rights Violation in Belarus in 2006" (PDF). Minsk: Charter96.
- Lis, A. (1999). ""Наша ніва" [1920]". Энцыклапедыя гісторыі Беларусі [History of Belarus: Encyclopaedia] (in Russian). Minsk: БелЭн. ISBN 985-11-0141-9.
- Alexandrovich, S. H. (1967). Пуцявіны роднага слова [History of the Native Word] (PDF) (in Belarusian). Minsk: Полымя. pp. 208–221.
- Belozorovich, V. A. (2018). "Роль Белорусской исторической публицистики в формировании национальной концепции истории (1906–1915 гг.)" (PDF). "Proceedings", FSGSU Journal. 4 (109). FSGSU. ISSN 1609-9672.
- Dovnar, L. (2009). "Роль Вильни в возрождении белорусской печати в начале XX века: идейные и персональные связи" [Vilnius in Belarusian Press Revival in Early XX Century: Ideological and Personal Connections]. Knygotyra (52): 197–210. ISSN 0204-2061.
- Gronsky, A. D. (2006). "Национальный вопрос на страницах газеты "Наша Нива" (1910 г.)" [National Question in "Nasha Niva" Newspaper (1910)]. Current Challenges in Modern Humanitarian Education: 3 Scientific Conference for Young Researchers (in Russian). Minsk: National Institute For Higher Education: 175–180. Archived from the original on 27 April 2014.
- Gronsky, A. D. (2014). "Отражение событий лета 1914 г. в белорусскоязычной газете "Наша нива"" [Summer 1914 Events in Belarusian Newspaper "Nasha Niva"] (PDF). Conference 'First World War, Versailles System and Modernity', Collected Works (in Russian). Saint Petersburg State University: 188–197.
- Labintzev, Y. A.; Shavinskaya, L. L. (2017). "Белорусское национальное движение к началу Первой мировой войны: аналитический обзор информированного современника 1914" [Belarusian National Movement before First World War: Witness Review in 1914]. The Slavic Almanac (in Russian) (3–4): 508–538.
- Laminskaya, M. (2009). ""Nasha Niva" 1906-1915 гг. I "Nasha Niva"1920 г.: Фдзiн праект цi розныя выданнi?" ["Nasha Niva" 1906-1915 and "Nasha Niva" 1920: One Project or Different Publications?] (PDF). 'Europe: New Neighborhood 2008' International Students Conference (in Belarusian). Vilnius: EHU: 54–60. ISBN 978-9955-773-27-6.
- Lougovtsova, S. L. (2015). "First Russian Revolution and Belarusian National Revival" (PDF). Belarusian State University (in Russian): 62–69.
- Nadson, Alexander (1967). "Naša Niva". The Journal of Byelorussian Studies. I (3): 184–206.
- Nesterenko, A. (2011). "СМИ как инструмент холодной гражданской войны" [Mass Media as a Tool in Cold Civil War]. Belarusian Yearbook (in Russian) (1): 161.
- Morozova, S. V.; Sosno, V. A.; Panov, S. V. (2011). History of Belarus, Late XVIII - Early XX Centuries, Schoolbook for 9th grade (PDF) (in Russian). Minsk: Belarusian state University (BSU). pp. 147–150. ISBN 978-985-476-929-5. Archived from the original (PDF) on 10 October 2021.
- Motulsky, R. S. (2012). "Книгопроизводство и книгораспространение в Беларуси в конце XVIII - начале XX века" [Book Printing and Publishing in Belarus between Late XVIII - Early XX Centuries] (PDF). Books in Cultural Space (in Russian). 1 (8). The Russian State Library: 34–46. Archived from the original (PDF) on 3 October 2020.
- Samusevich, O. M. (2006). "Роль газеты "Наша Нива" (1906–1915) в формировании национальной речемыслительной культуры" ["Nasha Niva" Newspaper (1906–1915) in National Verbal and Cogitative Culture]. Works of International Scientific Conference (in Russian). Kyiv: Taras Shevchenko National University of Kyiv: 44–45.
- Sorkina, I. (2014). Евреи в белорусской национальной идеологии начала XX века: по материалам газеты "Наша Нiва" (1906–1915) [Jews in the Belarus National Ideology of the Early XXth Century by the Newspaper "Nasha Niva" (1906–1915)] (PDF) (in Russian). Moscow: Russian Academy of Sciences, Institute of Oriental Studies. pp. 43–75. ISBN 978-5-89282-612-9.
- Trachuck, T. (2016). "Украино-белорусские отношения и газета "Наша Нива"" [Belarus-Ukraine Relationship and "Nasha Niva" Newspaper] (PDF). Journal of KNU (in Russian): 139–144.
- Tsumareva, E. P. (2012). "Полемика в прессе по национальному вопросу в северо-западном крае (по страницам газеты "Окраины России")" [Dispute in Press on the National Issue in the Northwest Region (on Materials of the newspaper "Okrainy Rossii")] (PDF). Journal of Polotsk State University (in Russian) (1): 44–49. Archived from the original (PDF) on 2 December 2020.
- Unuchak, A. U. (2011). "Наша Нива и белорусское национальное движение начала XX в." ["Nasha Niva" and Belarusian National Movement in Early XX Century] (PDF). Acta Humanitarica Universitatis Saulensis: Mokslo Darbai (in Russian) (12). Інстытут гісторыі Нацыянальнай акадэміі навук Беларусі: 172–180. ISSN 1822-7309.
- Unuchak, A. U. (2017). "Yanka Kupala and Yakub Kolas in "Nasha Niva"". Proceedings of the National Academy of Sciences of Belarus, Humanitarian Series (in Belarusian) (3): 51–56. ISSN 1024-5928.
- Volzhenkov, V. V. (2009). "Полемика "Нашай Нiвы" с правой прессой" ["Nasha Niva" Polemics and Right Press] (PDF). Journal of Polotsk State University (in Russian). 1: 34–40. Archived from the original (PDF) on 2 December 2020.
