= Vileyka reservoir =

Water reservoir in Belarus

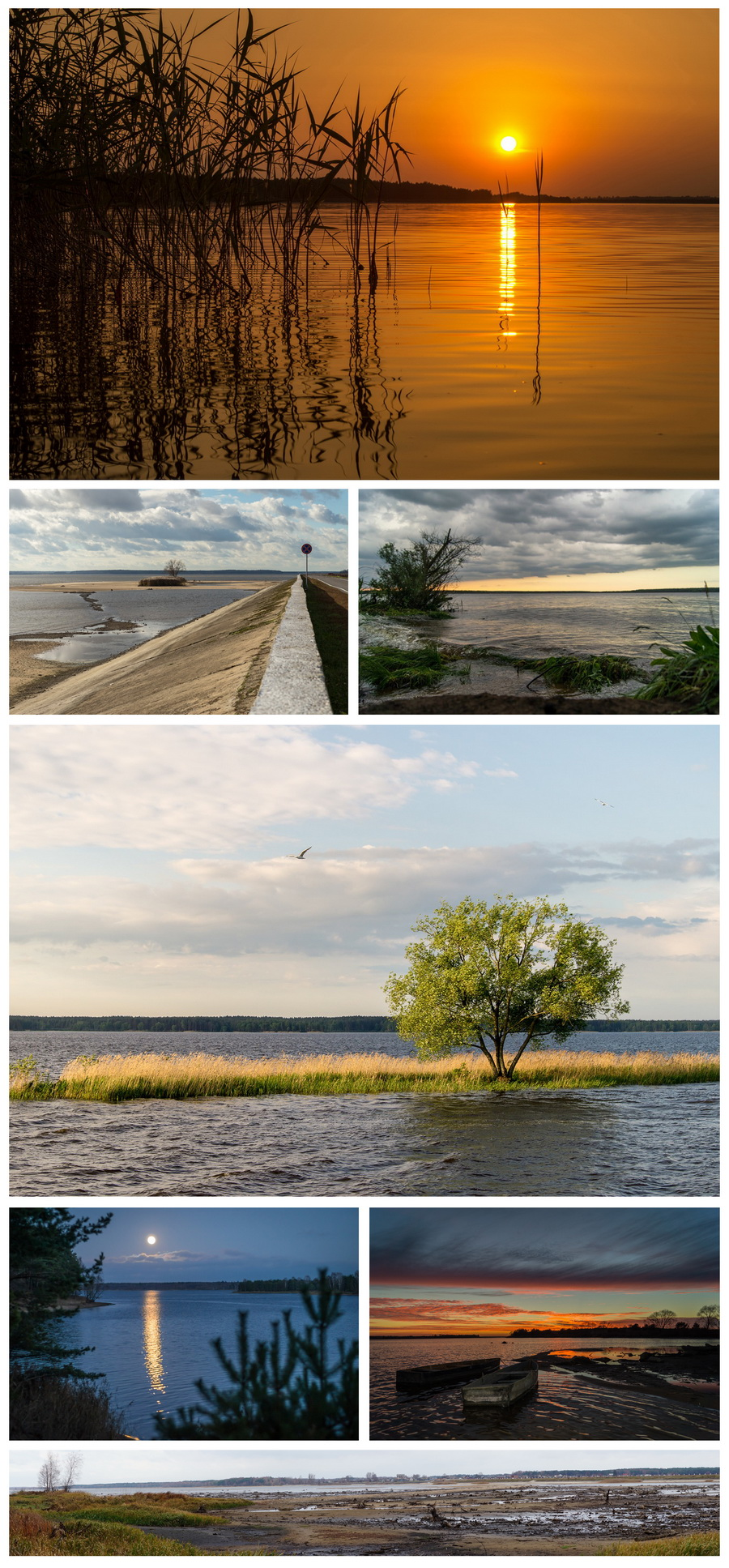

- Location within Belarus
- Location: Minsk Region, Belarus
- Coordinates: 54°21′00″N 27°3′00″E
- Basin countries: Belarus
- Max. length: 27 km (17 mi)
- Max. width: 3 km (1.9 mi)
- Surface area: 64.6 km^{2} (24.9 sq mi)
- Average depth: 3–5 m (9.8–16.4 ft)
- Max. depth: 13 m (43 ft)
- Water volume: 238 million cubic metres (8.4×10^{9} cu ft)
- Settlements: Vileyka

Vileyka reservoir (Belarusian: Вілейскае вадасховішча, Russian: Вилейское водохранилище) is a water reservoir in the Vileyka-Minsk water system. It is the largest artificial lake in Belarus.

== Description ==
Map of the reservoir

Vileyka reservoir is the largest artificial reservoir of Belarus, second in size to the largest natural lake, Narach. It has a surface area of 64.6 km^{2}, a length of 27 km, a maximum width of 3 km, a maximum depth of 13 m, and an average volume of 238 million cubic meters. Its catchment area is 4,120 square kilometers, mineralization of water - 280–320 mg/L.

== History ==
The Vileyka reservoir construction was started in 1968. The reservoir was created to increase the amount of fresh water for the republic's capital Minsk. For this purpose it was necessary to transfer some of the large Belarusian river's flow into the river Svislach. Along with the construction of the reservoir was built the Vileyka water channel through which water from the Viliya (Neris) and from the Svislach passed east of the reservoir. The water rises to the level of more than 70 meters with a few Hydraulic power station. The Viliya river was dammed in 1973, and in early 1975 water from the reservoir went through the channel to the capital, Minsk. The annual transfer of water is 575 million tons.

== See also ==
- Vileyka
- Viliya (Neris)
