= Andrej Dyńko =

Belarusian journalist

- Born: January 13, 1974 (age 52)
- Occupations: Editor, journalist
- Known for: Naša Niva chief editor (2000-2006)

Andrej Vasilević Dyńko (Belarusian: Андрэй Васілевіч Дынько) (born 1974) is a Belarusian journalist. In 2000-2006 he served the chief editor of the oldest Belarusian weekly newspaper Naša Niva. Later he headed magazines Nasha Historyja (Наша гісторыя), Arche, and publications for children in the Belarusian language Dudu and Asciarozhna: dzieci!

== Biography ==
=== Career ===
He began his work as a translator and publicist. He translated from French, Italian, English, Polish, and Ukrainian languages. Dynko edited Nasha Niva since 1999 till 2017, he also taught in Minsk State Linguistic University in 1997–2000. He was one of the co-founders of Arche magazine in 1998–2004.

Under his leadership Nasha Niva became the most red web site in the Belarusian language. Nobel laureate Svetlana Alexievich described Dynko as the person who ensured the success of ‘Nasha Niva’ and made the publication one of the most important in Belarus.

In 2018 Dynko became the chief editor of 'Nasha Historyja'. Since 2019 he is also the chief editor of magazines for children in the Belarusian language Dudu and Asciarozhna: dzieci!

He got Hanno Ellenbogen Citizenship Award (2003), Oxfam-Novib Award (2006), «For Journalistic Courage and Professionalism» Award (2006), Lorenzo Natali Prize (2007). Dynko is married to Natallia Dynko and has three children: Jakub, Justyna, and Vasil.

During the 2006 protests, in opposition to the results of the 2006 Presidential Elections, Dynko was detained at a protest rally on March 21, 2006, and spent ten days in a jail. His prison diaries were published thereafter and translated in a number of languages. The arrest was used by the authorities as the reason to refuse registration to 'Nasha Niva'.

=== Arrest ===
Following the nationwide protests in Belarus after the 2020 presidential election that was denounced as rigged by the opposition and the West, the authorities started a crackdown campaign wiping all independent media in the country. ‘Nasha Niva’ covered the protests and was eventually banned as ‘extremist’ in November 2021, exactly on the 115th anniversary of its founding; its website was blocked in July.

By 2021 Dynko was serving as chief editor of the ‘Nasha Historyja’ (Наша гісторыя), the Arche, and the «Асцярожна: дзеці!» magazines, also published by ‘Nasha Niva’. On July 8, 2021, Dyńko was arrested together with Nasha Niva editor-in-chief Yahor Martsinovich and editor Andrey Skurko. He was declared suspected first under the article 342 of the Criminal Code of Belarus («Organisation or preparation of mass disturbances or participation in mass disturbances»). The accusation was not submitted. Instead the detention continued under suspect under the art. 216 part 2 of the Criminal Code of Belarus («Causing property damage without signs of theft»). Like other political prisoners, he stayed in Akrescina prison without any bedding and personal belongings in cells where light was never switched off.

On July 12, 2021, by a joint statement of ten organizations, including the Human rights center "Viasna", the Belarusian Association of Journalists, the Belarusian Helsinki Committee, the Belarusian PEN Center, he was recognized as a political prisoner.

On July 21, 2021, Dynko was released under an undertaking to appear. He described his detainment as ‘being in hell’. According to Dynko, the detained in Okrestina are kept in inhuman conditions.
