= 40th Army (1941–1945) =

Soviet field army during WWII

- 40-я армия
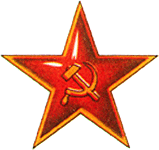
- Active: 1941–1946
- Allegiance: Armed Forces of the Soviet Union
- Branch: Ground Forces
- Type: Army
- Part of: Southwestern Front; Bryansk Front; Voronezh Front; 1st Ukrainian Front; 2nd Ukrainian Front
- Engagements: Kursk–Oboyan Operation; Voronezh–Voroshilovgrad Operation; Ostrogozhsk–Rossosh Operation; Voronezh–Kastornoe Operation; Belgorod–Kharkov Operation; Kiev offensive operation Zhitomir–Berdichev Operation; Korsun–Shevchenkovsky Operation; Uman–Botoshani Operation; Jassy–Kishinev Operation; Bucharest–Arad Operation; Debrecen Operation; Budapest Operation; Banska–Bystrica offensive operation Bratislava–Brno offensive operation Prague Operation

The 40th Army was a field army of the Red Army during the Second World War.

The army was formed on August 26, 1941, as part of the Southwestern Front on the basis of the 27th Rifle Corps. Disbanded in May 1946, following the demobilization of the Soviet Union.

== Formation and deployment ==
The 40th Army was formed in August 1941 as part of the Southwestern Front of the First Formation on the basis of the 27th Rifle Corps. It was deployed (as part of the airborne corps and three divisions) along the Desna River to counter the enemy's breakthrough into the rear of the Southwestern Front from the north. The 38th and 40th Armies, which were outside the pocket, were to support the withdrawal of the troops of the Southwestern Front from the encirclement by striking at Romny and Lubny.

At the forefront of the offensive of the 2nd Panzer Group were the Soviet 40th and 21st Armies. The 40th Army built defenses on the Glukhov–Chaplievka Front and further along the Desna. According to the task set by the front commander, the 40th Army had two areas for cover: Krolevets–Vorozhba and Krolevets–Konotop. In Directive No. 00332, the commander of the Southwestern Front demanded from the commander of the 40th Army "a strong cover for the right wing of the front from enemy attacks from the north". Thus, the center of gravity of the efforts of the 40th Army was concentrated on covering the southern and, in the extreme case, the southwestern direction, that is, the direction towards Romny or Priluki.

The front command planned its actions based on the directive of the Headquarters of the Supreme High Command No. 002374 on the transition of the troops of the Southwestern Front to the defense in order to prevent the enemy from seizing the Kharkov Industrial Region and Donbass. In accordance with this, the Kharkov Direction was covered by two armies (21st and 38th), and Sumy by the 40th Army.

== Combat actions ==
=== Combat actions from 26 August to 30 September 1941 ===
In mid–August 1941, the Southwestern Front went on the defensive on the left bank of the Dnepr River. Kiev was held by Soviet troops. The enemy could not advance in the direction of the cities of Chernigov, Konotop, Kharkov. The Headquarters of the Supreme High Command decided to create the 40th Army by allocating troops from the 37th and 26th Front Armies to ensure the junction of the Southwestern Front with the Bryansk Front and organize a strong defense along the Desna River, north of the city of Konotop. The neighbor on the right was the 21st Army of the Bryansk Front, and the neighbor on the left was the 5th Army and the 27th Rifle Corps of the Southwestern Front, which were withdrawn to the eastern bank of the Dnepr River.

By the end of August, the situation on the right flank of the Southwestern Front became more complicated. The enemy bypassed the 21st Army of the Bryansk Front, the 5th and 37th Army of the Southwestern Front on the left in the area of the cities of Chernigov, Kiev, Nezhin. There were no troops on the Desna River to repulse the enemy. The 40th Army was also unable to hold back the German troops marching towards the city of Romny.

By the beginning of September, the 40th Army at the line of Dubovichi, Chaplievka, Baturin, Volovitsa was fighting with the troops of the 2nd German Panzer Group. On the left, the 21st Army of the Bryansk Front was defending at the line of Snovsk, Semyonovka, Konyatin. Even to the east, the 5th Army of the Southwestern Front was defending at the turn of Sednev, Chernigov, Lyubech, Sorokoshichi. On the right, on the left bank of the Desna, the Bryansk Front held the line.

The 2nd Tank Group of Guderian of the Army Group Center, advancing in the direction of Konotop, broke through to the Desna on September 1 and captured a bridgehead near Shostka on its left bank.

The 40th Army withdrew in a southeasterly direction. The 21st Army, bypassed from the east by the troops of the 2nd Panzer Group, and from the west by the 2nd German Army, which approached Chernigov, was under the threat of encirclement and began to hastily retreat south to the Desna.

By September 10, the situation on the flanks of the Southwestern Front was difficult, the troops could be surrounded. On September 10, Colonel General Mikhail Kirponos, commander of the troops of the front, reported to the Chief of the General Staff of the Red Army Marshal of the Soviet Union Boris Shaposhnikov that the enemy was already in Romny and Grayvoron. The 21st and 40th Armies could not liquidate the enemy here. The army needed troops from the Kiev Fortified Region and a withdrawal to the border of the Psyol River. A reinforcement in the amount of two rifle divisions was received from the 26th Army of the front and they were to advance from the Bakhmach, Konotop Area.

On September 11, the commander of the front, Colonel General Mikhail Kirponos, negotiated through communications with the Supreme Commander–in–Chief Joseph Stalin and received instructions to attack the enemy's Konotop Grouping with all possible forces along with the troops of the Bryansk Front; organize defense along the Psyol River with the forces of 5–6 divisions, placing a large artillery group with a front to the north and west; keep the capital of the Ukrainian Soviet Socialist Republic, the city of Kiev, until the creation of defenses on the Psyol River, and only then begin the evacuation of the population, troops and property from the city.

On September 15, the 1st and 2nd German Tank Groups united in the area of Lokhvitsa, surrounding many troops and the headquarters of the Southwestern Front.

On September 20, the headquarters of the Southwestern Front was destroyed, the commander of the front, Colonel General Mikhail Kirponos, died.

On September 30, a new department of the Southwestern Front was created, Marshal of the Soviet Union Semyon Timoshenko was appointed commander of the troops. The 40th Army became part of the front. The troops of the front were ordered to go over to a tough defense. The Military Council organizes defense at the line of Vorozhba, Lebedin, Shishaki, Krasnograd, Novomoskovsk. The commander of the 40th Army, Major General Kuzma Podlas, was given the task of closing the Sumy Direction, the troops of the 21st and 38th Armies defended the Kharkov Direction, the troops of the 6th Army covered the Donbass from the north. The 40th Army waged stubborn battles in the Shtepovka Area.

=== Combat actions from 1 to 15 October 1941 ===
As a result of the German offensive, the troops of the Southwestern Front were covered from both flanks: the enemy penetrated deeply into the defenses of neighboring fronts, and the depth of coverage was 60–200 kilometers, and communication with adjacent formations was lost. Under these conditions, on October 6, 1941, the command of the Southwestern Front decided to withdraw the right–flank armies (40th and 21st) 45–50 kilometers to the Sumy–Akhtyrka–Kotelva Line in order to cover Belgorod and the northern approaches to Kharkov. The retreat of the Soviet troops took place under energetic pursuit by the enemy, who delivered butt–to–back blows to the retreating formations, creating a threat to their encirclement. As a result, the 29th Army Corps of the Wehrmacht broke into Sumy on the move, and the 51st Army Corps captured Akhtyrka. The planned withdrawal line was occupied by the enemy, which forced the Soviet troops to retreat further to the east.

=== Combat actions from 16 to 22 October 1941 ===
In accordance with the directive of the Stavka, the front command ordered the army headquarters to withdraw troops by October 20, 1941, to the intermediate line of defense Oboyan – Belgorod – Merefa – Zmiyov – Balakleya – Barvenkovo. The retreat of the front formations was carried out in three divergent operational directions: Belgorod (40th and 21st Armies), Kharkov (38th Army) and Izyum (6th Army). The withdrawal of the army took place in conditions of insignificant opposition from the enemy.

=== Stabilization of the front line ===
While the formations of the 38th Army were fighting in the Kharkov Direction, the rest of the armies of the Southwestern Front continued to withdraw. On October 24, 1941, having broken through the defenses of the 21st Soviet Army, units of the 29th Army Corps captured Belgorod. The withdrawal of Soviet troops took place in extremely difficult weather conditions. Roads were washed out by continuous rains, and the troops operated in off-road conditions. In addition, a significant part of the equipment began to stop on the routes due to lack of fuel. The same problems were experienced by the German units of Army Group South that were pursuing them. Therefore, the main opposition to the retreating troops of the Southwestern Front was provided by enemy aviation forces. The headquarters of the Army Group South and the command of the 6th Army of the Wehrmacht considered the tasks of the Autumn Campaign completed and planned to go on the defensive in this sector of the front. Already on October 27, the main forces of the 40th, 21st and 38th Armies broke away from the enemy and had no contact with him. The battles were fought only by formations of the 6th Soviet Army, holding the defense along the Seversky Donets. By the end of October, German troops, exerting slight pressure, crossed the Donets and, having created several bridgeheads on the eastern bank, went on the defensive. Under these conditions, the command of the Southwestern Front decided to stop the withdrawal of troops and go on the defensive in the Tim–Balakleya–Izyum Sector and further along the Seversky Donets River to Yampol. This frontier allowed to ensure the uninterrupted operation of the railway line Kastornoe – Kupyansk – Lisichansk. Also, this configuration of the front line made it possible to prepare for further operations of the Red Army in order to liberate Kharkov as soon as possible.

On December 4, 1941, the Germans broke through the defense front of the 40th Army and, developing success in the northeast direction, occupied Prilepy, Lisiy Kolodets, Kuzkino and Pogozhee. The 87th Infantry Division was given the task of closing the gap, which it successfully coped with, recapturing the village of Pogozhee.

On the morning of December 8, the enemy resumed the offensive in the Kursk–Kastornoe Direction. The commander of the 40th Army set the task for the division, providing cover at the occupied line, to regroup and on foot to go to the Serebryanka–Tretyakovka–Afanasevskoe Area in order to stop the German offensive in the oncoming battle. Then, in cooperation with other units, it was to defeat the opposing enemy forces in the settlements of Leninsky and Perevalochnoe and immediately capture Cheremisinovo and the city of Shchigry.

Having traveled 40 km, the 87th Rifle Division was able to concentrate in a given area only by the evening of December 10, 1941.

On the morning of December 11, 1941, the 87th Infantry Division attacked German positions and captured two villages.

=== Yelets Operation ===
In the zone of the Southwestern Front in the first half of December, during the Yelets Operation, the troops of the 3rd and 13th Armies defeated the German troops. The 40th Army, adjacent to them from the south, pinned down the enemy forces and attacked in the direction of Cheremisinovo from the line of the Kshen River, but made almost no progress.

Nevertheless, in the spirit of the general decision of the Headquarters of the Supreme High Command to go on the offensive in the western direction, the command of the South–Western Direction (Commander–in–Chief – Marshal of the Soviet Union Semyon Timoshenko) decided to go on the offensive with the forces of the armies of the right flank of the Southwestern Front (commander – Lieutenant General Fyodor Kostenko): 40th Army (commander Lieutenant General Kuzma Podlas) in the Kursk Direction and 21st Army (commander Major General Vasily Gordov) in the Oboyan Direction, in order to capture the cities of Kursk and Oboyan, respectively. At the same time, the 40th Army practically received no reinforcements, and the 21st Army, although it was brought into battle from the front reserve, where it was replenished for two months, it also had a significant shortage. In fact, each of the armies was a reinforced rifle corps. There were no mobile means of development of success (tank formations) at all, there was also a big shortage in artillery and ammunition. Each of the armies solved the tasks of breaking through the German defenses independently; shock army groups were not created in their composition either. The tasks of breaking through the enemy defenses, thus, were solved by ordinary rifle divisions. And, finally, the armies were not even fully involved in the operation, but acted only with parts of their forces (for example, in the 21st Army, out of 5 divisions, 2 participated in the operation); fettering and distracting blows were practically not used. The plan of operation was not worked out sufficiently by the front command, the main burden for its development was assigned to the army headquarters. In fact, the operation was reduced to independent actions of two armies in separate directions. Even their transition to the offensive began at different times, as soon as they were ready. All this made it easier for the German command to repel the Soviet offensive.

The Soviet troops in the Kursk–Oboyan Direction were opposed by the troops of the left wing of the 6th German Army (commander Field Marshal Walter von Reichenau, from January 5, 1942 – General of Tank Forces Friedrich Paulus (29th Army Corps)) and the right flank of the 2nd German Army, Colonel General Maximilian von Weichs (48th Motorized Corps). They created an enhanced defense system based on the creation of powerful defense nodes in populated areas and on the dominant high–rises with fully shot–through gaps between them.

=== Kursk–Oboyan Operation ===
During the Kursk–Oboyan Operation, having not received time to prepare the operation and without strengthening the troops, following the order of the command, the 40th Army went on the offensive on December 20, 1941, with the initial task of reaching the Tim River line, and then advancing on Kursk.

On the morning of December 22, the division, interacting with the 1st and 2nd Guards Divisions, went on the offensive and in the afternoon liberated the settlements of Perevalochnoe, Marmyzhi, the Soviet Farms of Roskhovets and Sukhoy Khutor. On December 24, its units fought for the villages of Ivanovka, Pozhidaevka, Krasnaya Polyana, and by the end of the day on December 27, they reached the area of the villages of Plakhovka, Golovinovka, Polevoe and Petrovka.

Having advanced 10–12 kilometers with heavy fighting, on December 25, the army liberated the heavily fortified village of Tim by storm, by December 28, 1941, it reached the line of the Tim River and forced it. On December 28, 1941, the 21st Army also went on the offensive in the Oboyan Direction, liberating 5 villages on the first day, 2 more villages the next day and cutting the Kursk–Belgorod Railway. In the following days, the offensive developed slowly, amounting to squeezing out the enemy and slowly "gnawing through" its defenses: on December 30, the 40th Army occupied 3 villages (and lost one as a result of a counterattack), the 21st Army took 2 villages. The attacks were carried out in deep snow, without sufficient reconnaissance. Repeated frontal attacks on the same lines prevailed, without proper artillery support. Aviation actions in conditions of prevailing cloudy weather and snowfalls were episodic and ineffective.

Having determined the directions of the strikes of the Soviet troops, the German command promptly pulled up fresh units to the threatened directions. The Germans carried out a stubborn defense of settlements, even those that were surrounded, forcing the Soviet troops to waste their forces in repeated attacks, and when the attacking units suffered heavy losses, they launched strong counterattacks, seeking to influence the flanks and rear.

On January 1, 1942, the troops of the 21st Army, continuing the offensive, reached the village and stronghold of Marino, but were able to capture it only at dawn on January 4. On January 3, units of the 21st Army captured Gorodishche, Krivtsovo, Zorinskie Dvory, intercepting the Oboyan–Belgorod Highway. On January 4, the villages of Nagolnoe and Bobryshevo were liberated, and the previously blockaded garrison in the village of Shakhovo was eliminated. On January 5, 1942, Soviet troops reached the villages of Kazatskoe, Pushkarnoe, Streletskoe, which were located near Oboyan.

Fierce protracted battles unfolded for Oboyan. The first units broke into the eastern outskirts of Oboyan on the afternoon of January 4 (160th Infantry Division). On January 5, Oboyan as a whole was blocked. The enemy, strongly fortified in the city, put up stubborn resistance. Its resistance and counterattacks against other advancing units also sharply increased, in fact, having achieved a stop to their offensive. Extremely stubborn, but inconclusive battles unfolded across the entire strip of both Soviet armies – the troops stomped in one place, fighting for the same settlements. In Oboyan on January 6, with heavy losses, they managed to capture the fortified buildings of the station and the elevator. On the night of January 7, 1942, a decisive attempt was made to liberate Oboyan, during the day of the assault on January 7 and 8, Soviet troops managed to break into the city center several times, but for the most part each time they were pushed back. Only some units managed to gain a foothold in the city and they fought in the encirclement. To turn the tide in the operation in the zone of the 21st Army, the 8th Motorized Rifle Division of the People's Commissariat of Internal Affairs was introduced into battle. On January 8, 1942, one regiment of this division, in cooperation with units of the 169th Infantry Division, captured the northwestern outskirts of the village of Kazatskoe and the eastern outskirts of Oboyan, other units occupied the eastern half of the city. On January 9, units of the 8th Motorized Rifle Division of the People's Commissariat of Internal Affairs reached the center of Oboyan.

During these battles, a battalion of the 777th Infantry Regiment of the 227th Infantry Division under the command of Lieutenant Khachatur Melikyan made a daring 40–kilometer raid on the rear of the enemy in the Oboyan Direction. The battalion defeated 4 enemy garrisons in the village of Orlovka, the Farms of Zorinskie Dvory, Vesyoly and Peresyp. By his actions, he facilitated the offensive in the Oboyan Direction. In the battle on January 8, 1942, the battalion commander died a hero's death. On November 5, 1942, he was posthumously awarded the title of Hero of the Soviet Union.

In order to hold Oboyan, the enemy used the failure of the 227th Infantry Division, which from the very beginning of the offensive was unable to capture the Prokhorovka Station. The Germans launched a counteroffensive north of Prokhorovka and pushed back parts of the division from it. On January 9, the Germans began to push the neighboring units of the 169th Infantry Division. In connection with the threat of encirclement by superior enemy forces from Zorino, Bolshaya Psinka, Nagolnoe and the lack of ammunition and fuel, on January 10, an order was received to withdraw troops from Oboyan. Although the Soviet command sought to further block the Oboyan Garrison until the threat of a German bypass was removed, and then repeat the assault on the city, this was not possible.

The Germans pushed our troops back from Oboyan by about 20 kilometers, to the area of the village of Krasnikovo. The Soviet units took up defensive positions at approximately the same line from which the offensive began. On January 11, stubborn battles began at this turn, the parties exhausted each other with mutual attacks.

To the north, by January 6, units of the 40th Army with difficulty reached the line of the Seym River, overcame it on ice, and by January 8 reached the area 28–30 kilometers south and southeast of Kursk. But the army no longer had the strength for a decisive blow to Kursk. From January 10, German units also launched strong counterattacks, stopping the Soviet advance. On January 15 and 18, the army again tried to break through the enemy defenses, but achieved only the most insignificant advance. Particularly stubborn fighting took place in the area of the village of Vypolzovo (occupied by Soviet troops on January 15, repulsed by the enemy on the 23rd, liberated again on the 24th).

On January 18, the Soviet troops again went on the offensive, transferring the main blow to the Shchigry Direction. This time, the offensive was linked with the actions of the left wing of the front troops, which launched the Barvenkovo–Lozovaya Operation on that day. In the zone of the 40th Army, a specially formed group of General Vasily Kryuchyonkin went on the offensive from the Tim River, broke through the defenses and occupied several villages. The 21st Army on the left flank again went on the offensive against Oboyan, the 38th Army – against Belgorod. In the following days, Kryuchyonkin's Group slowly advanced towards Shchigry, and the offensive of the 21st and 38th Armies stalled almost immediately. By January 23, the Germans managed to stop the advance of the Kryuchyonkin's Group, which did not reach Shchigry for 20 kilometers. Fierce battles unfolded there, lasting until February 5. As a result, the group was surrounded and forced to fight its way out from there with losses.

- Separate Consolidated Detachment of Special Purpose, Major General Alexey Chesnov:
- 3rd Airborne Corps, from November 1941, the 87th Rifle Division;
- 293rd Rifle Division (Colonel Pavel Lagutin);
- 227th Rifle Division (Colonel Gevorg Ter–Gasparian);
- 1st Guards Motor Rifle Division (Colonel Alexander Lizyukov).

=== Combat actions in 1942 ===
As part of the Bryansk Front. Early in the morning of June 28, 1942, the German offensive began as part of Operation Blau. The enemy struck at the junction of the 13th and 40th Armies in the direction of the southeast (Kastornoe–Voronezh). The main blow was delivered by the 4th Panzer Army of Colonel General Hermann Hoth south of the Kursk–Voronezh Railway with the task of reaching the Don. To the south, the troops of the 2nd Hungarian Army under the command of Colonel General Yani advanced towards Stary Oskol. To the north, the 55th Army Corps was advancing. Throwing three tank divisions (24th, 9th and 11th), three infantry and one motorized division on a 45–kilometer front against three Soviet rifle divisions, the Germans easily broke through their defenses and, wedged 10–15 km, went to the Tim River, to the south city of Livny.

Realizing the danger of the German offensive, the Soviet command pulled up the 1st and 16th Tank Corps from the Army and the 17th Tank Corps from the Headquarters Reserve to the Kastornoe Area. The order to move to Kastornoe was also received by the 4th and 24th Tank Corps from the Southwestern Front of Timoshenko. The 5th Tank Army was also sent there (commander – Major General Alexander Lizyukov).

By the end of July 2, 1942, the German troops, having advanced in the zone of the Bryansk Front to a depth of 60–80 km and in the zone of the South–Western Front to 80 km, surrounded part of the formations of the 40th and 21st Armies to the west of Stary Oskol. The 60th, 6th and 63rd Armies were urgently sent to the Voronezh Direction from the Reserve of the Headquarters of the Supreme High Command. At the same time, the 5th Tank Army, reinforced by the 7th Tank Corps, and the 1st Fighter Aviation Army of the Reserve of the Headquarters of the Supreme High Command were concentrated in the Yelets Area with the aim of delivering a counterattack against the wedged enemy.

Bryansk Front. On July 4, the Chief of the General Staff, Alexander Vasilevsky, arrived in the Yelets Region and personally set the task for Kazakov and Lizyukov: with a simultaneous attack by all available forces west of the Don, intercept the communications of the Goth Tank Group, which had already broken through to the Don, and disrupt its crossing across the river. With access to the Zemlyansk–Khokhol Region, the 5th Army, with the support of the thinned corps of Pavelkin and Katukov, was supposed to help the troops of the left flank of the 40th Army break out of the encirclement. The operation was ordered to begin no later than 15–16 hours of the next day, without waiting for the full concentration of all forces. By the appointed time, only the 7th Tank Corps of Major General Pavel Rotmistrov reached the starting line. The main body of the army was still on the way. As a result, it was not possible to simultaneously bring the main forces of the tank army into battle. The corps entered the battle on the move, without preparation. The army headquarters did not have specific information about the enemy.

On July 6, 1942, Wehrmacht troops crossed the Don and captured most of Voronezh. In connection with the counterattack of the 5th Tank Army from the area south of Yelets on the left flank of the Weichs Army Group, the German command was forced to withdraw the 24th Panzer Corps, three infantry divisions and the 4th Panzer Army from the group advancing along the Don.

=== Combat actions from 1943 to 1945 ===
The plan of the Kharkov offensive operation "Zvezda" provided for two enveloping strikes in the following directions: by the 40th Army with the 5th Guards Tank Corps – at Belgorod, Dergachi, the western outskirts of Kharkov; 69th Army – to Novy Oskol, Volchansk, northeastern outskirts of Kharkov; the 3rd Tank Army with the 6th Guards Cavalry Corps – to Valuyki, Chuguev, the southeastern outskirts of Kharkov.

The offensive of the strike force of the Voronezh Front was provided: from the north, by the troops of the right wing of the front (the 60th and 38th Armies struck in the Kursk and Oboyan Directions, with the task of capturing the cities of Kursk and Oboyan); from the south – the development of the offensive of the troops of the 6th Army of the Southwestern Front in the Kupyansk–Balakleya Direction.

Having successfully completed the Ostrogozhsk–Rossosh and Voronezh–Kastornoe offensive operations, the troops of the Voronezh Front under the command of General Philip Golikov, with the forces of the 40th, 69th and 3rd Tank Armies, without an operational pause on February 2, began the Kharkov offensive operation "Star". The line of defensive structures created by the enemy on the Oskol River, at the turn of Stary Oskol, Novy Oskol and Valuyki, was broken through, and our troops began to advance in a southwestern direction with stubborn battles.

Overcoming the ever–increasing resistance of the enemy, on February 9, units and formations of the 40th, 69th and 3rd Tank Armies began to liberate the territory of Soviet Ukraine from the fascist invaders. The troops of the 69th Army under the command of General Mikhail Kazakov were the first to enter Ukrainian soil. During February 9, they repelled several strong counterattacks by units of the SS Panzer Division "Reich" and by the end of the day they stormed the regional center of the Kharkov Region, Volchansk. In the battle for the city, units of the 180th Infantry Division especially distinguished themselves. The gunner of the 2nd Battery of the 15th Anti–Tank Battalion of the 180th Division, Private Pudozin, with well–aimed fire from a 45–millimeter gun, knocked out six Nazi tanks, and Private Nikitin of the anti–tank rifle company disabled two enemy tanks.

The troops of the 40th and 3rd Tank Armies began to cover Kharkov from the northwest and southeast. At the same time, the right–flank 60th Army successfully developed the offensive in the Kursk Direction. Having received intelligence data that the enemy intends to transfer reserves to the Kursk Region, the army commander, General Ivan Chernyakhovsky, decided to speed up the liberation of the city. Two shock groups were created, which, having bypassed Kursk from the north and south, on the morning of February 8, completely liberated the ancient Russian city from the fascist invaders. Neighbor on the left – the troops of the 6th Army of the Southwestern Front, developing the offensive in the Izyum–Lozovsky Direction, captured Alekseevsky, Sakhnovshchina and continued to develop the offensive in the southwestern direction.

In the snowy expanses of Kharkov region, fierce battles did not stop day or night. Continuing the offensive, by February 10–12, the troops of the Voronezh Front liberated Velikaya Pisarevka, Zolochev, Cossack Lopan, Volchanok, Stary Saltov, Pechenegs, Chuguev and a number of large settlements north and east of Kharkov.

— Gladkov N. N. On the Fiery Frontiers (documentary essay) — Prapor, 1984

In May 1945, all troops belonging to the 40th Army were transferred to other armies. The army administration was transferred to the Odessa military district, where it received new troops under command. The army command was stationed in Odessa. In May 1946, the army was disbanded.

== Composition of the army ==
On May 1, 1945.

Army as part of the 2nd Ukrainian Front.

Rifle Troops:

- 51st Rifle Corps:
  - 133rd Rifle Division;
  - 232nd Rifle Division;
  - 240th Rifle Division.
- 54th Fortified Area.

Artillery of the Reserve of the Supreme High Command, army and corps:

- 153rd Cannon Artillery Brigade;
- 387th Separate Artillery Regiment;
- 680th Anti–Tank Artillery Regiment;
- 10th Mountain Pack Mortar Regiment;
- 492nd Mortar Regiment;
- 622nd Anti–Aircraft Artillery Regiment.

Armored and mechanized troops:

- 34th Separate Division of Armored Trains.

Engineering Troops:

- 4th Engineer Brigade.

Flamethrower Units:

- 4th Separate Flamethrower Battalion;
- 21st Separate Flamethrower Battalion.

Other units of the army subordination:

- 2nd Separate Guards Communications Regiment.

== Air Force of the 40th Army ==
The Air Force Command of the 40th Army was formed on February 10, 1942 on the basis of the 19th and 63rd Aviation Divisions.

On May 13, 1942, the 206th Aviation Division was formed on the basis of the Air Force Directorate of the 40th Army.

== Combat and command staff ==
=== Commanders ===
- Major General, from November 1941 – Lieutenant General Kuzma Podlas (August 1941 – March 1942);
- Lieutenant General of Artillery Mikhail Parsegov (March – July 1942);
- Lieutenant General Markian Popov (July – October 1942);
- Lieutenant General, from September 1943 – Colonel General Kirill Moskalenko (October 1942 – October 1943);
- Lieutenant General Filipp Zhmachenko (October 1943 – February 1946);
- Vladimir Kolpakchi, Colonel General (February – May 1946).

=== Members of the Military Council of the Army ===
- Divisional Commissar Matvey Malanin (August 1941 – November 1942);
- Brigadier Commissar Ivan Grushetsky;
- Divisional Commissar Konstantin Krainyukov (November 1942 – October 1943);
- Major General Kirill Kulik (October 1943 – Until the End of the War).

=== Army Chiefs of Staff ===
- Major General Zinovy Rogozny (August 1941 – February 6, 1942; March 13, 1942 – February 1943);
- Nikolai Eremin (February 6 – March 13, 1942);
- Major General Vladimir Bensky (February – April 1943);
- Major General Alexander Batyunya (April – November 1943);
- Colonel Vladimir Beloded (November 1943 – January 1944);
- Colonel, since February 1943 – Major General Lev Sosedov (January 1944);
- Major General Vladimir Sharapov (January 1944 – March 1945);
- Colonel, from May 1945 – Major General Ivan Pigin (March 1945 – Until the End of the War);
- Lieutenant General Alexander Batyunya (1945 – 1946).

=== Heads of the Armored Department of the Army, Deputy Army Commander for Tank Forces ===
- On December 6, 1941 – Polyakov, Colonel;
- February 1, 1942 – January 1, 1943 – Ilya Kretov, Colonel.

== Awards of units of army subordination ==
- 2nd Separate Guards Communications Regiment (Uman, Red Banner, Order of Bogdan Khmelnitsky).

== Sources ==
- Fortieth Army // Radio control - Tachanka / [under the general. ed. N. V. Ogarkova]. - M. : Military publishing house of the Ministry of Defense of the USSR, 1980. - (Soviet military encyclopedia: [in 8 volumes]; 1976–1980, v. 7).
- Red Banner Kyiv. Essays on the history of the Red Banner Kyiv Military District (1919–1979). Ch. 10. At the turn of the Dnieper. / Ed. 2nd, rev. and additional - K. : Politizdat of Ukraine, 1979. - S. 199–223.
- Military encyclopedic dictionary. - M. : Military Publishing House, 1984. - S. 503 - 40th Army; P. 162 - Voronezh-Voroshilovgrad defensive operation 06/28-07/24/1942; pp. 526–527 - Ostrogozhsk-Rossosh offensive operation 13–27.01.1943; P. 162 - Voronezh-Kastornenskaya offensive operation 24.01–2.02.1943; P. 792 - Kharkov offensive operation 2.02.-3.03.1943; Kharkov defensive operation 03/4-25/1943; S. 386 - Kursk defensive operation 07/5-23/1943; Kursk offensive operation 12.7–23.08.1943; P. 847 - Iași-Iași-Chișinău offensive operation 20–29.08.1944; P. 224 - Debrecen offensive operation 6–28.10.1944; P. 105 - Budapest offensive operation 10/29/1944–02/13/1945; P. 99 - Bratisla-Brnovskaya offensive operation 03/25-05/05/1945; P. 584 - Prague offensive operation 6–11.05.1945.
- Dudarenko M. L., Perechnev Yu. G., Eliseev V. T. et al. Liberation of cities: A guide to the liberation of cities during the Great Patriotic War of 1941–1945. / Under the total. ed. S. P. Ivanova. - M. : Military Publishing House, 1985. - 598 p.
- Moskalenko K. From Voronezh to Kharkov. // Military Historical Journal, 1963, No. 4. - P. 31.
- History of the Second World War 1939–1945. T. 4. - M. : Military Publishing House, 1975.
- John Erickson. Road to Stalingrad. - London: Cassell Military, 2003. - 608 p. — ISBN 9780304365418.
