= Kursk–Oboyan Operation =

1941–1942 front-line offensive near Kursk

- Part of the Great Patriotic War
Date	December 20, 1941 – January 26, 1942
Location	Kursk Oblast, Russian Soviet Federative Socialist Republic, Union of Soviet Socialist Republics
Result	Minor advance of the Workers' and Peasants' Red Army

Belligerents
Union of Soviet Socialist Republics	Germany

Commanders and leaders
Semyon Timoshenko; Fyodor Kostenko	Walter von Reichenau; Friedrich Paulus; Maximilian von Weichs

Strength
121,000	Unknown

Casualties and losses
Irrevocable: 10,586; Sanitary losses: 19,996; Total losses: 30,582	Unknown

The Kursk–Oboyan Offensive Operation in December 1941 – January 1942 was a front–line offensive operation of the Soviet Troops of the right wing of the Southwestern Front. An integral part of the winter counter–offensive of the Red Army of 1941–1942. Stubborn fighting in the Belgorod Direction continued for 70 days and ended in vain after mutual exhaustion of forces and the onset of mud. (Note: In Soviet historiography, January 26 was considered the end of the offensive. However, the fighting did not stop until the beginning of the spring thaw. Snow melting in the battle area began on March 24.) Along with other unsuccessful offensives of the winter–spring period of 1942, the operation was not mentioned in Soviet official historiography.

== Previous events ==
After successfully repelling the German offensive in the Battle of Moscow, Stalin considered it possible to launch offensives on all sectors of the front from Leningrad to the Black Sea with the goal of achieving a decisive victory during 1942. (Note: On January 1, 1942, an extended meeting of the Headquarters of the Supreme High Command, the highest command body of the Union of Soviet Socialist Republics, took place. The meeting was attended by: Chief of the General Staff Boris Shaposhnikov and his deputy Aleksandr Vasilevsky, members of the State Defense Committee Georgy Malenkov and Lavrenty Beriya, as well as member of the State Defense Committee Nikolay Voznesensky, who was responsible for plans for the production of weapons. The issue of strategic plans for 1942 was discussed. The main report was given by Shaposhnikov. It was proposed to launch an offensive on all sectors of the front – northern, central and southern – with the goal of achieving a decisive victory already in 1942. Georgy Zhukov and Nikolay Voznesensky spoke at the discussion. Voznesensky said that the material resources of the Union of Soviet Socialist Republics were not enough to implement such a large–scale plan. Zhukov believed that resources should not be scattered in all directions, but concentrated on the central sector of the front, as the most important. The discussion was summed up by Stalin, who pointed out that it was necessary not to refer to difficulties, but to look for ways to overcome them. The plan for a general offensive was approved; the corresponding orders were sent to the front commanders.) (Note: The Stalinist Method of "Offensive Along the Entire Front" was used later in the war, which often led to unjustified losses with limited results.) The military industry, developed beyond the Urals, supplied more and more weapons. The Red Army was replenished with another conscription. All this made it possible not only to replenish the active units of the Workers' and Peasants' Red Army, but also to create 9 reserve armies.

One of the offensive operations in the spring of 1942 was the Kursk–Oboyan Operation.

== Idea of the operation ==
During the winter counter–offensive of 1941–1942, Soviet troops attacked the enemy on almost all fronts, especially on the North–Western, Western, Bryansk and South–Western fronts. In the zone of the Southwestern Front in the first half of December, during the Yelets Operation, troops of the 3rd and 13th Armies defeated German troops. The 40th Army, neighboring to them from the south, pinned down the enemy forces and attacked in the direction of Cheremisinovo from the line of the Kshen River, but made almost no progress.

Stalin's Directive of January 7, 1942 ordered the troops of the South–Western Direction (Commander–in–Chief – Semyon Timoshenko) to go on the offensive with the armies of the right flank of the South–Western Front (Front Commander – Lieutenant General Fyodor Kostenko): 40th Army (Commander Lieutenant General Kuzma Podlas) in the Kursk Direction and the 21st Army (Commander Major General Vasily Gordov) in the Oboyan Direction, with the goal of capturing the cities of Kursk and Oboyan, respectively. If the offensive was successful, the Bryansk Front was ordered to advance in the direction of Oryol in order to enter the flank and rear of the German defense at Bolkhov from the north, defeat the enemy south of Belyov and support the offensive of the Western Front from the south.

At the same time, the 40th Army received practically no reinforcements, and the 21st Army, although it was brought into battle from the front reserve, where it was replenished for two months, also had a significant shortage. In fact, each of the armies was a reinforced rifle corps. There were no mobile means of developing success (tank formations) at all; there was also a great shortage of artillery and ammunition. Each of the armies solved the problem of breaking through the German defense independently; shock army groups were also not created within them. The tasks of breaking through enemy defenses were thus carried out by ordinary rifle divisions. And finally, the armies were not even fully involved in the operation, but acted only with parts of their forces (for example, in the 21st Army, out of 5 divisions, 2 participated in the operation); pinching and distracting blows were practically not used. The operation plan was not sufficiently developed by the front command; the main burden of its development was placed on the army headquarters. In essence, the operation was reduced to independent actions of two armies in separate directions. Even their transition to the offensive began at different times, as they were ready. All this made it easier for the German command to repel the Soviet offensive.

The Soviet troops in the Kursk–Oboyan Direction were opposed by the troops of the left wing of the 6th German Army (Commander Field Marshal Walter von Reichenau, from January 5, 1942 – General of Tank Forces Friedrich Paulus) (29th Army Corps) and the right flank of the 2nd German Army, General Colonel Maximilian von Weichs (48th Motorized Corps). They created a reinforced defense system, based on the creation of powerful defense units in populated areas and at commanding heights with completely shoot–through gaps between them.

== Fighting ==
Having received no time to prepare the operation and without strengthening the troops, following the orders of the command, the 40th Army went on the offensive on December 20, 1941, with the initial task of reaching the Tim River Line and then advancing on Kursk. Having advanced 10–12 kilometers with heavy fighting, on December 25 the army liberated the heavily fortified village of Tim by storm, and by December 28, 1941, it reached the line of the Tim River and crossed it.

On December 28, 1941, the 21st Army went on the offensive in the Oboyan Direction, liberating 5 villages on the first day, 2 more villages the next day and cutting the Kursk–Belgorod Railway.

In the following days, the offensive developed slowly, boiling down to squeezing out the enemy and slowly "gnawing through" its defenses: on December 30, the 40th Army occupied 3 villages (and lost one as a result of a counterattack), the 21st Army took 2 villages. The attacks were carried out in deep snow, without sufficient reconnaissance. Repeated frontal attacks on the same lines, without proper artillery support, prevailed. Aviation operations in conditions of prevailing cloudy weather and snowfall were sporadic and ineffective.

Having determined the direction of the attacks of the Soviet troops, the German command quickly brought fresh units to the threatened directions. The Germans carried out a stubborn defense of populated areas, even when they were surrounded, forcing Soviet troops to waste their strength in repeated attacks, and when the attacking units suffered heavy losses, they launched strong counterattacks, trying to influence the flanks and rear.

On January 1, 1942, the troops of the 21st Army, continuing the offensive, reached the village and stronghold of Marino, but were able to capture it only at dawn on January 4. On January 3, units of the 21st Army captured the villages of Gorodishche, Krivtsovo and Zorinskie Dvory, intercepting the Oboyan–Belgorod Highway. On January 4, the villages of Nagolnoe and Bobryshevo (the center of the Krivtsovsky District) were liberated, and the previously blocked garrison in the village of Shakhovo was liquidated. On January 5, 1942, Soviet troops reached the suburban villages of Oboyan: Kazatskoe, Pushkarnoe and Streletskoe.

Fierce, protracted battles for Oboyan unfolded. The first units broke into the eastern outskirts of the city on the afternoon of January 4 (160th Infantry Division). On January 5, Oboyan was completely blocked.

The enemy, having fortified itself in the city, offered stubborn resistance. Its resistance and counterattacks against other attacking units also sharply increased, which actually led to a halt in their advance. Throughout the entire zone of both Soviet armies, extremely stubborn but ineffective battles unfolded – the troops were marking time in one place, fighting for the same populated areas. In Oboyan on January 6, with heavy losses, they managed to capture the fortified buildings of the station and elevator. On the night of January 7, 1942, a decisive attempt was made to liberate the city; during the 24–hour assault on January 7 and 8, Soviet troops managed to break into the city center several times, but for the most part each time they were pushed back from there. Only some units managed to gain a foothold in the city, and they fought surrounded.

To turn the tide in the operation in the 21st Army zone, the 8th Motorized Rifle Division of the People's Commissariat of Internal Affairs was brought into battle. On January 8, 1942, one regiment of this division, in cooperation with units of the 169th Infantry Division, captured the northwestern outskirts of the village of Kazatskoe and the eastern outskirts of Oboyan, other units occupied the eastern half of the city. On January 9, units of the 8th Motorized Rifle Division of the People's Commissariat of Internal Affairs reached the center of Oboyan.

During these battles, a battalion of the 777th Infantry Regiment of the 227th Infantry Division under the command of Lieutenant Khachatur Melikyan made a daring 40–kilometer raid behind enemy lines. The battalion defeated 4 enemy garrisons in the village of Orlovka, the villages of Zorinskie Dvory and Vesely in the Ivnyansky District and Peresyp in the Oboyansky District. With his actions, he facilitated the offensive in the Oboyan Direction. In the battle on January 8, 1942, the battalion commander died a hero's death. On November 5, 1942, he was posthumously awarded the title of Hero of the Soviet Union.

In order to hold Oboyan, the enemy took advantage of the failure of the 227th Infantry Division, which from the very beginning of the offensive was unable to capture the Prokhorovka Station. The Germans launched a counteroffensive north of Prokhorovka and pushed parts of the division away from it. On January 9, the enemy began to press out neighboring units of the 169th Rifle Division. Due to the threat of encirclement from Zorino, Bolshaya Psinka, Nagolnoe and the lack of military supplies and fuel, on January 10 an order was received to withdraw troops from Oboyan. Although the Soviet command sought to continue blocking the Oboyan Garrison until the threat of a German encirclement was lifted, and then repeat the assault on the city, this was not possible.

The Germans pushed Soviet troops back about 20 kilometers from Oboyan, to the area of the village of Krasnikovo. Soviet units took up defensive positions approximately at the same line from where the offensive began. On January 11, stubborn fighting began on this line, the sides exhausted each other with mutual attacks.

To the north, units of the 40th Army by January 6 barely reached the Seym River, crossed it on ice, and by January 8 reached an area 28–30 kilometers south and southeast of Kursk. But the army no longer had the strength to carry out a decisive blow to Kursk. On January 10, German units also launched strong counterattacks, stopping the Soviet advance. On January 15 and 18, the army again tried to break through the enemy's defenses, but achieved only the most insignificant progress. Particularly stubborn fighting took place in the area of the village of Vypolzovo (occupied by Soviet troops on January 15, repulsed by the enemy on January 23, liberated again on January 24).

On January 18, Soviet troops again went on the offensive, shifting the main attack to the Shchigry Direction. This time the offensive was linked to the actions of the left wing of the front forces, which began the Barvenkovo–Lozovaya Operation on that day.

In the zone of the 40th Army, a specially formed group of General Vasily Kryuchyonkin went on the offensive from the line of the Tim River, broke through the defenses and occupied several villages. The 21st Army on the left flank again went on the offensive towards Oboyan, the 38th Army – towards Belgorod. In the following days, Kryuchyonkin's Group slowly advanced towards Shchigry, and the advance of the 21st and 38th Armies stalled almost immediately. By January 23, the Germans managed to stop the advance of Kryuchyonkin's Group, which did not reach Shchigry 20 kilometers. Fierce fighting broke out there and lasted until February 5th. As a result, the group was surrounded and had to fight their way out with losses.

== Results ==
In general, during the operation, Soviet troops did not achieve their goals, despite persistent attacks and the heroism of the personnel. In the offensive zone of the 40th Army, by the end of the operation the front line was moved from 15 to 35 kilometers to the north–west, in the zone of the 21st Army it remained approximately the same where it was at the beginning of the operation.

The losses of Soviet troops amounted to 10,586 irretrievable losses and 19,996 sanitary losses in the period from January 2 to January 26, 1942. (Note: In "Russia and the Union of Soviet Socialist Republics in the Wars of the 20th Century" the start of the operation is given as January 3, 1942, although it began December 20, 1941. Thus, the losses of Soviet troops in the period from December 20, 1941 to January 2, 1942 inclusive are not covered by this source and, therefore, the information provided is incomplete.) German casualties are unknown. (Note: Absent from Soviet and Russian sources.)

The reasons for the failure are typical for all other offensive operations of the Soviet troops in the winter of 1941–1942: incorrect planning of the offensive (the German defenses were independently broken through not only by each army, but also by each division participating in the offensive), an extremely short period of preparation, lack of superiority over the enemy, lack of shock tank formations, an acute lack of artillery, illiterate tactical actions (constant attacks on the same lines and populated areas in the same directions with heavy losses). The situation was aggravated by the cold winter with high snow cover.

In the report of the Headquarters of the Southwestern Front on the Oboyan Operation, the reasons for this failure were reduced to the unsuccessful actions of the command of the army and divisions: unsatisfactory reconnaissance, insufficient preparation of troop actions, loss of command and control of troops on the battlefield. Assessing the results of the offensive, its participant Semyon Ivanov came to the conclusion that the reasons for the failures of the Workers' and Peasants' Red Army are much deeper:

The main thing was that the principle of sequential concentration of forces was violated: three armies, (Note: By the third army, the author means the 38th Army, which at the same time was trying to advance on Belgorod.) which were barely equal in composition to rifle corps without reinforcements, were tasked with simultaneously capturing Kursk, Oboyan, Belgorod – and this despite the enemy's significant superiority and the presence of organized defense, artillery fire systems and, finally, under the most unfavorable weather conditions.

— Semyon Ivanov. Army Headquarters, Front–Line Headquarters. Moscow, 1990. Page 197

In Soviet times, this operation was not studied and was practically not mentioned.

== Analysis ==
American historian David Glantz (Note: In November 2015, David Glantz was awarded the medal of the Russian Ministry of Defense "For Strengthening the Military Commonwealth" for his objective coverage of the role of the Red Army in World War II.) draws an analogy with other offensive operations of the Workers' and Peasants' Red Army in the winter–spring period of 1941–42, which also ended unsuccessfully with significant losses. Such operations, according to Glantz, include:

- Demyansk Offensive Operation (March 1 – April 30);
- Lyuban Offensive Operation (January 7 – April 30);
- Rzhev–Vyazma Strategic Offensive Operation (January 7 – February 18);
- Bolkhov Operation (March 24 – April 3);
- Barvenkovo–Lozovaya Operation (January 7 – April 30);
- Crimean Offensive (February 27 – April 15, 1942).

The reason for the failure of the Soviet offensives, according to Glantz, was the general underestimation of the Wehrmacht forces by the Supreme High Command and the overestimation of the capabilities of the Red Army, as well as the dispersion of the forces of the Workers' and Peasants' Red Army in many directions. (Note: The Stalinist Doctrine of "Offensive Along the Entire Front" was applied further during the war, which often led to unjustified losses with limited results.)

== See also ==
- Barvenkovo–Lozovaya Operation

== Sources ==
- Pyotr Kachur, V. V. Nikolsky. Under the Banner of Sivash Fighters: the Combat Path of the 169th Infantry Division (Rogachyov, Red Banner, Order of Suvorov, II Degree and Kutuzov, II Degree, 1941–1945). Moscow, 1989. Page 42
- The Great Patriotic War – Day After Day: Based on Declassified Operational Reports of the General Staff of the Red Army. October 1 – December 31, 1941. Volume 2: "Disruption of the Blitz War Plan". Moscow. 2008.
- The Great Patriotic War – Day After Day: Based on Declassified Operational Reports of the General Staff of the Red Army. January 1 – June 30, 1942. Volume 3: "Through New Challenges". Moscow. 2008.
- Alexander Manzhosov, Alexander Nemtsev. Kursk–Oboyan Offensive Operation (January 1942). Pages 140–146 // Oboyan and Oboyans in Domestic and Foreign History and Culture: Collection of Materials from the Interregional Scientific Conference (City of Oboyan, April 21, 2012) / Editor–Compiler Alexey Razdorsky – Oboyan, 2013 – 341 Pages
- Alexander Nemtsev. Combat Operations of Soviet Troops on the Territory of the Central Black Earth Region in the Fall of 1941 – Summer of 1942 (Based on Materials from the Kursk Region): Dissertation for the Title of Candidate of Historical Sciences – Kursk, 2006 – 423 Pages
- Valery Zamulin. Failed Victory (from the History of the Kursk–Oboyan Offensive Operation) // "We Do Not Just Remember the Day of the War...": Kursk Military–Historical Collection. Issue 4 – Kursk: Yumex Publishing Center, 2011 – Pages 30–35
- Vladimir Korovin, Alexander Manzhosov, Alexander Nemtsev, Igor Tsukanov. They Brought Victory Closer as Best They Could. Combat Operations of the Bryansk, Southwestern Fronts and Partisans Against the Troops of Nazi Germany and Its Allies in the Central Black Earth Region of the Russian Soviet Federative Socialist Republic (October 1941 – July 1942) – Kursk: Kursk State University; Publishing House "Slavyanka", 2006 – 322 Pages
- Vitaly Pankov. History of Military Operations of the Soviet Air Force on the Territory of the Kursk Region. October 1941 – June 1943: Dissertation for the Title of Candidate of Historical Sciences – Kursk, 2014
- Isaev, Alexey (2005). The Offensive of Marshal Shaposhnikov. The History of the Great Patriotic War That We Did Not Know. Moscow: Yauza.
- Glantz, David (2001). "The Soviet–German War, 1941–1945: Myths and Realities: a Survey". 20th Anniversary Distinguished Lecture at the Strom Thurmond Institute of Government and Public Affairs. Clemson, South Carolina.
- Erickson, John (2003). Road to Stalingrad. London: Cassell Military. ISBN 9780304365418.
