= Winter campaign of 1941–1942 =

1941–1942 military campaign

- Part of Eastern Front (World War II)
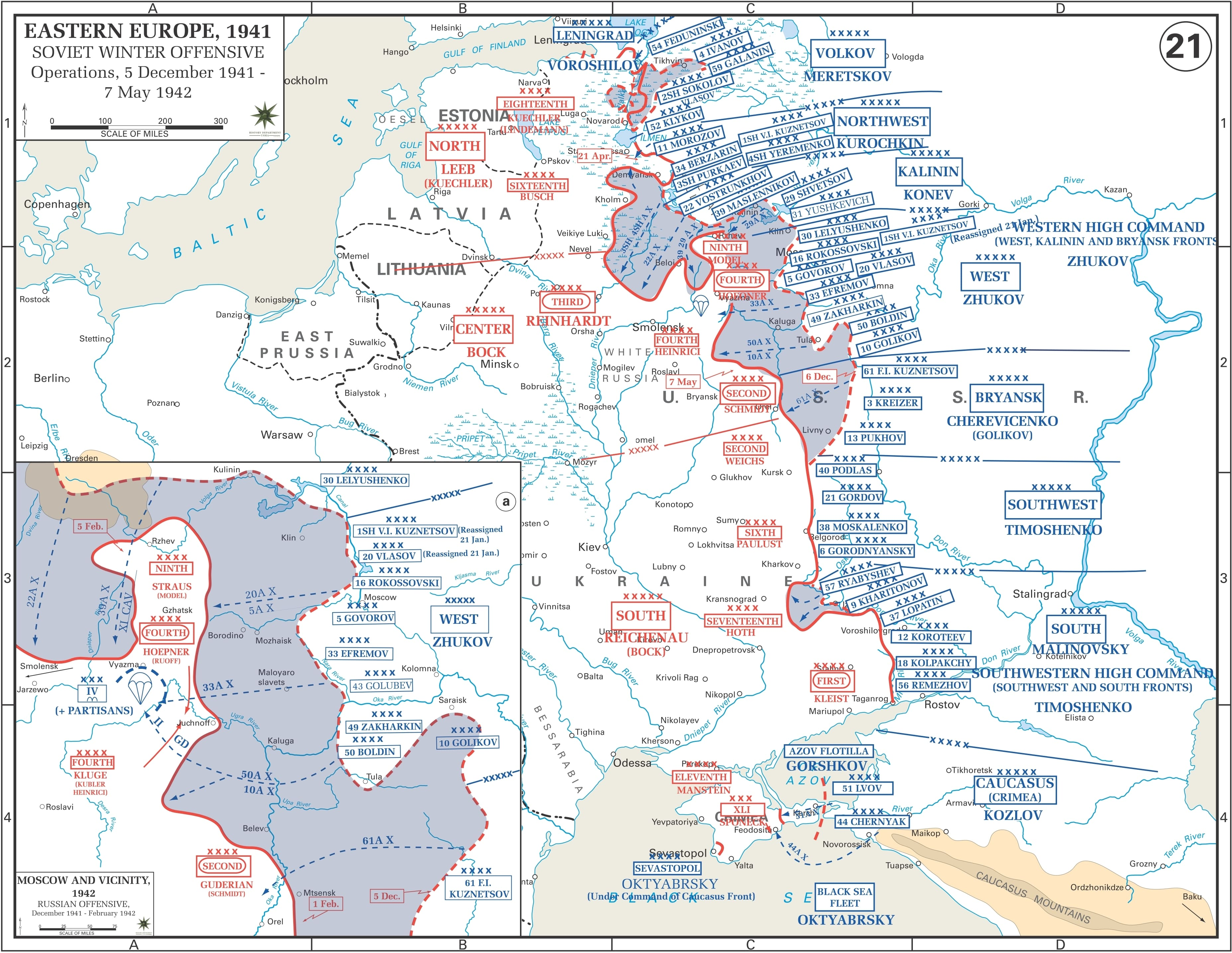
- Map of the Soviet 1941–1942 winter counteroffensive.
Date	5 December 1941 – 6 May 1942
Location	European Russia and Ukraine
Result	Inconclusive
Territorial changes	Soviets push German army 150–300 kilometers from their positions at the end of Operation Barbarossa

Belligerents
(Nazi Germany) Germany	Soviet Union

Commanders and leaders
Erich Hoepner; Adolf Strauss; Ludwig Kübler; Walter Model	Georgy Zhukov; Ivan Konev; Vasily Sokolovsky; Dmitry Lelyushenko

The winter campaign of 1941–1942 was the name given by Soviet military command to the period from 5 December 1941 to 7 May 1942 that marked the start of Soviet counter-offensives following the invasion of the Soviet Union by Nazi Germany, Operation Barbarossa. The campaign began with the Moscow Strategic Offensive Operation (5 December 1941 – 7 January 1942) with the simultaneous Kerch-Feodosia Amphibious Operation (25 December 1941 – 2 January 1942). Although the Red Army counter-offensives forced the German army into the retreat and led to the recapture of important sites such as Tikhvin, Klin and Rostov in December 1941, the Red Army mostly failed to encircle the German units there and Germans managed to avoid significant casualties. (Note: The Red Army came close to encircling large German panzer formations at Tikhvin, Klin and Rostov in the December counter-offensive, but lacked the strength and skill to pull this off. Indeed, despite the recovery of terrain, the Red Army failed to destroy any major German units. By the end of December 1941, the NKVD reported only 10,602 German prisoners in Soviet captivity, whereas the Germans had captured 3,355,000 Soviet soldiers in the previous six months.147 Yet the Red Army's own tank forces were in very poor shape by the end of 1941 and only able to play a supporting role in the Winter Counteroffensive. By Christmas 1941, the armoured forces of both the Wehrmacht and the Red Army had been virtually demolished and they each had very few operational medium or heavy tanks left after six months of sustained combat. Neither side was left with any substantial armoured reserve and consequently operations degenerated into First World War-era tactics.)

The operations in central and northern European Russia began with the conclusion of the Moscow counter-offensive almost simultaneously with the Kursk–Oboyan Operation Operation (3 January 1942 – 26 January 1942), the Lyuban Offensive Operation (7 January 1942 – 30 April 1942), the Demyansk Offensive Operation (7 January 1942 – 20 May 1942), the Orel–Bolkhov Offensive Operation (8 January 1942 – 28 April 1942), and the Rzhev-Vyazma Strategic Offensive Operation (8 January 1942 – 20 April 1942).

The campaign concluded with the Barvenkovo-Lozovaya Offensive Operation (18 January 1942 – 31 January 1942), another attempt to retake Crimea during the Crimean Offensive Operation (27 January 1942 – 15 April 1942) and the Bolkhov Offensive Operation (24 March 1942 – 3 April 1942).

== Sources ==
- Erickson, John (2003) [1975]. The Road to Stalingrad: Stalin's War with Germany. Vol. I. London: Cassell. ISBN 0-304-36541-6.
- Forczyk, Robert (2014). Tank Warfare on the Eastern Front 1941–1942: Schwerpunkt. Pen and Sword. ISBN 978-1-78159-008-9.
