= Mikhail Parsegov =

Soviet colonel general (1899–1964)

Mikhail Artemievich Parsegov
- Михаил Артемьевич Парсегов
- Born: 15 June 1899; Madatkent Village, Nagorno-Karabakh
- Died: 26 April 1964 (aged 64); Leningrad, Soviet Union
- Military career
- Allegiance: Russian Empire; Soviet Russia; Soviet Union
- Branch: Artillery, infantry
- Service years: (Russian Empire) 1916–1917 (Soviet Union) 1918–1964
- Rank: Colonel General
- Commands: 7th Army Artillery; Artillery of the Southwestern Front; 40th Army; Artillery of the Far Eastern Front; Artillery of the 2nd Far Eastern Front
- Conflicts: World War I; Russian Civil War; World War II; Winter War; Eastern Front
- Awards: Hero of the Soviet Union; Order of Lenin; Order of the Red Banner; Order of Suvorov; Medal "For the Victory over Germany in the Great Patriotic War 1941–1945"; Medal "For the Victory over Japan"; Jubilee Medal "XX Years of the Workers' and Peasants' Red Army"; Jubilee Medal "30 Years of the Soviet Army and Navy"

Mikhail (Mikael) Artemievich Parsegov (Russian: Михаил (Микаел) Артемьевич Парсегов; 15 June 1899 – 26 April 1964) was a Soviet military commander, colonel general of artillery (1958), and Hero of the Soviet Union (1940).

== Early service ==
Parsegov was born in the village of Madatkent (now Kolkhozashen) in Nagorno-Karabakh, to an Armenian family. His father worked as a potter, his mother ran the household. At age 12, he was left without parents and went to work in Central Asia. He worked at a ginnery in the city of Andijan.

Parsegov was drafted into the Imperial Russian Army in 1916. From September 1916 to November 1917 he served during the First World War on the Caucasus Front, initially as a private in artillery units, then as a gun commander with the rank of senior artillery officer.

In 1918, Parsegov voluntarily joined the Red Army. In the same year he was admitted to the All-Union Communist Party (Bolsheviks). He began his service in the fortress of Andijan as an assistant platoon commander, then for some time he acted as commandant of this fortress. From November 1918 to November 1919, as a platoon commander fought on the Turkestan Front, fought against the Basmachi – in Andijan, Kokand, Namangan, Skobelevsky areas; in the spring of 1919, he was wounded. In February 1920 – July 1921, as part of the Bukhara Front, he participated in the liquidation of gangs of the Bukhara emir. Since July 1921 – the foreman of the battery. He ended the Civil War as a battery commander.

In 1922, Parsegov graduated from the Tashkent artillery command courses. He served in the Leningrad Military District: from November 1922 – gun commander of the battery; from February 1923 – Chief of Communications of the Battery of the 14th Separate Regimental Heavy Division of the 11th Rifle Corps; since November 1924 – head of the chemical battery. In 1926, he graduated from the artillery Red Banner Improvement Courses for command personnel, after which he was appointed commander of the training battery of a separate heavy artillery division, and in February 1927 – commander of the training battery of the 13th Field Heavy Artillery Division. From March 1928, he temporarily commanded the 3rd Division of the Heavy Artillery Regiment of the 13th Rifle Corps, and from April 1929, the division of the 13th Corps Regiment. Since August 1930 – commander of the 5th Separate Territorial Artillery Battalion of the Volga Military District. Since November 1931 – commander and commissar of the 57th Ural Artillery Regiment of the Transbaikal Military District.

Since 1932, Parsegov studied at the Mikhail Frunze Military Academy, which he graduated in 1936 with a gold medal. Then in May 1936, he was appointed commander of the 69th Heavy Artillery Regiment of the 19th Rifle Corps.

== Winter War ==
In July 1937, Parsegov was promoted to the post of chief of artillery of the Leningrad Military District. On 17 February 1938 he was awarded the rank of brigade commander, and on 5 November 1939 – a divisional commander. Since December 1939, he participated in the Winter War, was appointed chief of artillery of the 7th Army under the command of the Commander of the 2nd Rank, Kirill Meretskov. The commander of the artillery of the army, commander Mikhail Parsegov, constantly traveled from unit to unit, taught artillerymen to scout, detect and destroy enemy bunkers, mine traps and other fortifications and fire weapons. The artillery units of the 7th Army under the command of Mikhail Parsegov destroyed many enemy fortifications and firing points, paving the way for the advance of infantry. The gunners of Mikhail Parsegov were especially distinguished at Lipolo and in the battles on the Trongsund direction. At the beginning of March 1940, after powerful and lengthy artillery preparation, the Mannerheim Defensive Line was broken. The troops of the 7th Army went on a decisive attack.

By a decree of the Presidium of the Supreme Council of the Soviet Union of 21 March 1940, for the exemplary performance of the combat missions of the command and the courage and heroism shown to it, the commander Mikhail Artemyevich Parsegov was awarded the title Hero of the Soviet Union with the award of the Order of Lenin and the Golden Star medal. On the same day, he was awarded the rank of corps commander.

In April 1940, Parsegov participated in a meeting at the Central Committee of the All-Union Communist Party (Bolsheviks) of the commanding staff on the collection of experience in military operations against Finland, where he expressed dissatisfaction with the work of intelligence and insufficient training of reserve officers, and also noted the crucial role of artillery in breaking through fortified areas. On 4 June 1940, he was re-certified as a lieutenant general of artillery.

On 26 July 1940, Parsegov was appointed inspector general of artillery of the Red Army. At a meeting of senior management of the Red Army on 23–31 December 1940, he expressed dissatisfaction with the training of commanders. Since June 1941 – chief of artillery of the Kiev Special Military District.

== Great Patriotic War ==
At the outbreak of the Great Patriotic War, Parsegov was serving as the chief of artillery of the Southwestern Front (that is, in the same position). He participated in the Kiev Defensive Operation. Covering the retreat of the Soviet troops, the artillerymen under the able command of Parsegov caused considerable damage to the enemy's equipment and manpower. Because of this the enemy's advance on Kiev was delayed for more than two months.

In autumn 1941 Parsegov participated in the Donbas Defensive Operation. During the counterattack near Moscow, he skillfully planned and clearly guided the artillery of the forces of the right wing of the Southwestern Front in the Yelets Offensive Operation. From 24 December 1941 Parsegov was the commander of artillery of the South-West direction. He distinguished himself in the Barvenkovo–Lozovaya Offensive Operation. From 5 March 1942 he was commander of the 40th Army of the Southwestern Front, transferring in May 1942 to the Bryansk Front.

According to the chief of staff of the Bryansk Front, Mikhail Kazakov:

The commander of the 40th Army Mikhail Parsegov is a keen man; at times he did not have the patience for a detailed analysis of the situation. I still remember one of his conversations with the front commander. – How do you rate your defense? – asked Philip Golikov.
The mouse will not slip – the commander answered confidently.

— Mikhail Kazakov. Above the Map of Past Battles

The 40th Army participated in the Voronezh–Voroshilovgrad Defensive Operation; on 30 June 1942, enemy forces, concentrating large forces against the right wing of the army, broke through the defense of Soviet troops in the cities of Livny and Volchansk, which led to the encirclement of many parts of the 40th Army and the rapid advance of the enemy to Voronezh. In this regard, Parsegov, who was in a state of severe psychological overstrain, was removed from his post on 3 July 1942.

Until 26 July 1942, Parsegov was in the reserve of the commander of artillery, and then was appointed chief of artillery of the Far Eastern Front. In this position, Parsegov made a lot of efforts to strengthen the combat effectiveness of the artillery units of the Far Eastern Front, applying in practice all his knowledge and experience of several wars.

During the Soviet–Japanese War, Parsegov was the chief of artillery of the 2nd Far Eastern Front. The troops led by him, along with troops from other fronts, crushed the deeply echeloned fortifications of the Japanese and defeated the Kwantung Army. He skillfully directed the artillery of the front to force the Amur and Ussuri Rivers. His troops participated in the liberation of Harbin and other Chinese cities and towns, as well as southern Sakhalin and the Kuril Islands.

== After the war ==
In the post-war period, Parsegov headed the artillery of the Far Eastern Military District, and from September 1946, he was deputy commander of the artillery of the Northern Group of Forces in Poland. In June 1948, at the end of the Higher Academic Courses at the Kliment Voroshilov Higher Military Academy, he was appointed commander of the artillery of the Belorussian Military District, and in June 1954 he was transferred to the Leningrad Military District to the same position. On 18 February 1958, he was awarded the rank of Colonel General of Artillery; since August of the same year he served concurrently as a member of the Military Council of the Leningrad Military District. In May 1961, he was relieved of his posts and was at the disposal of the Commander in Chief of the Ground Forces. Since August 1961, he was appointed head of the 1st Faculty of the Mikhail Kalinin Military Artillery Academy.

Parsegov died on 27 April 1964 in Leningrad. He was buried in the city's Bogoslovskoe Cemetery, with a monument erected on his grave.

In Kolkhozashen, the native village of Mikhail Parsegov, a bust monument was erected.

== Awards ==
- Gold Star Medal of the Hero of the Soviet Union (21 March 1940);
- Three Orders of Lenin (15 January 1940, 21 March 1940, 21 February 1945);
- Four Orders of the Red Banner (22 February 1938, 27 December 1942, 5 November 1944, 20 June 1949);
- Order of Suvorov, 2nd class (8 September 1945);
- Jubilee Medal "XX Years of the Workers' and Peasants' Red Army" (1938);
- Other medals.

== Military ranks ==
- Major – 30 December 1935;
- Colonel – 21 December 1937;
- Brigade Commander – 17 February 1938;
- Divisional Commander – 5 November 1939;
- Corps Commander – 21 March 1940;
- Lieutenant General of Artillery – 4 June 1940;
- Colonel General of Artillery – 18 February 1958.

== Sources ==
- Team of Authors. The Great Patriotic War. The Commanders. Military Biographical Dictionary / Edited by Mikhail Vozhakin – Moscow; Zhukovsky: Kuchkovo Field, 2005 – Pages 165–167 – ISBN 5-86090-113-5
- The Command and Command Staff of the Red Army in 1940–1941: Structure and Personnel of the Central Apparatus of the People's Commissariat of Defense of the Soviet Union, Military Districts and Combined Arms Armies: Documents and Materials / Edited by Vladimir Kouzelenkov – Moscow–Saint Petersburg: Summer Garden, 2005 – Page 181 – 1000 Copies – ISBN 5-94381-137-0
