= Cheremisinovsky District =

Cheremisinovsky District Черемисиновский район
- District
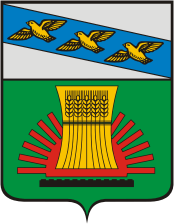
- Coat of arms
- Location of Cheremisinovsky District in Kursk Oblast
- Coordinates: 51°53′12″N 37°15′13″E
- Country: Russia
- Federal subject: Kursk Oblast
- Established: 1928
- Administrative center: Cheremisinovo

Area
  - Total: 813 km^{2} (314 sq mi)

Population (2010 Census)
  - Total: 10,347
  - Density: 12.7/km^{2} (33.0/sq mi)
  - Urban: 36.8%
  - Rural: 63.2%

Administrative structure
  - Administrative divisions: 1 Work settlements, 14 Selsoviets
  - Inhabited localities: 1 urban-type settlements, 98 rural localities

Municipal structure
  - Municipally incorporated as: Cheremisinovsky Municipal District
  - Municipal divisions: 1 urban settlements, 8 rural settlements
- Time zone: UTC+3 (MSK)
- OKTMO ID: 38648000
- Website: http://cher.rkursk.ru/

Cheremisinovsky District (Russian: Череми́синовский райо́н) is an administrative and municipal district (raion), one of the twenty-eight in Kursk Oblast, Russia. It is located in the northeast of the oblast. The area of the district is 813 square kilometers (314 sq mi). Its administrative center is the urban locality (a work settlement) of Cheremisinovo. Population: 7,804 (2021 Census); 10,347 (2010 Census); 12,431 (2002 Census); 14,160 (1989 Soviet census). The population of Cheremisinovo accounts for 43.1% of the district's population.

== Geography ==
Cheremisinovsky District is located in the north-east of Kursk Oblast, on the border with Oryol Oblast. The terrain is hilly plain averaging 200 meters (660 ft) above sea level; the district lies on the Orel-Kursk plateau of the Central Russian Upland. The district is 60 km (37 mi) northeast of the city of Kursk, and 480 km (300 mi) south of Moscow. The area measures 37 km (23 mi; north-south), and 27 km (17 mi; west-east). The administrative center is the town of Cheremisinovo.

The district is bordered on the north by Dolzhansky District of Oryol Oblast, on the east by Sovetsky District, Kursk Oblast, on the south by Timsky District, and on the west by Shchigrovsky District.
