= Bucharest–Arad Operation =

Romanian Operation
- Part of the Great Patriotic War
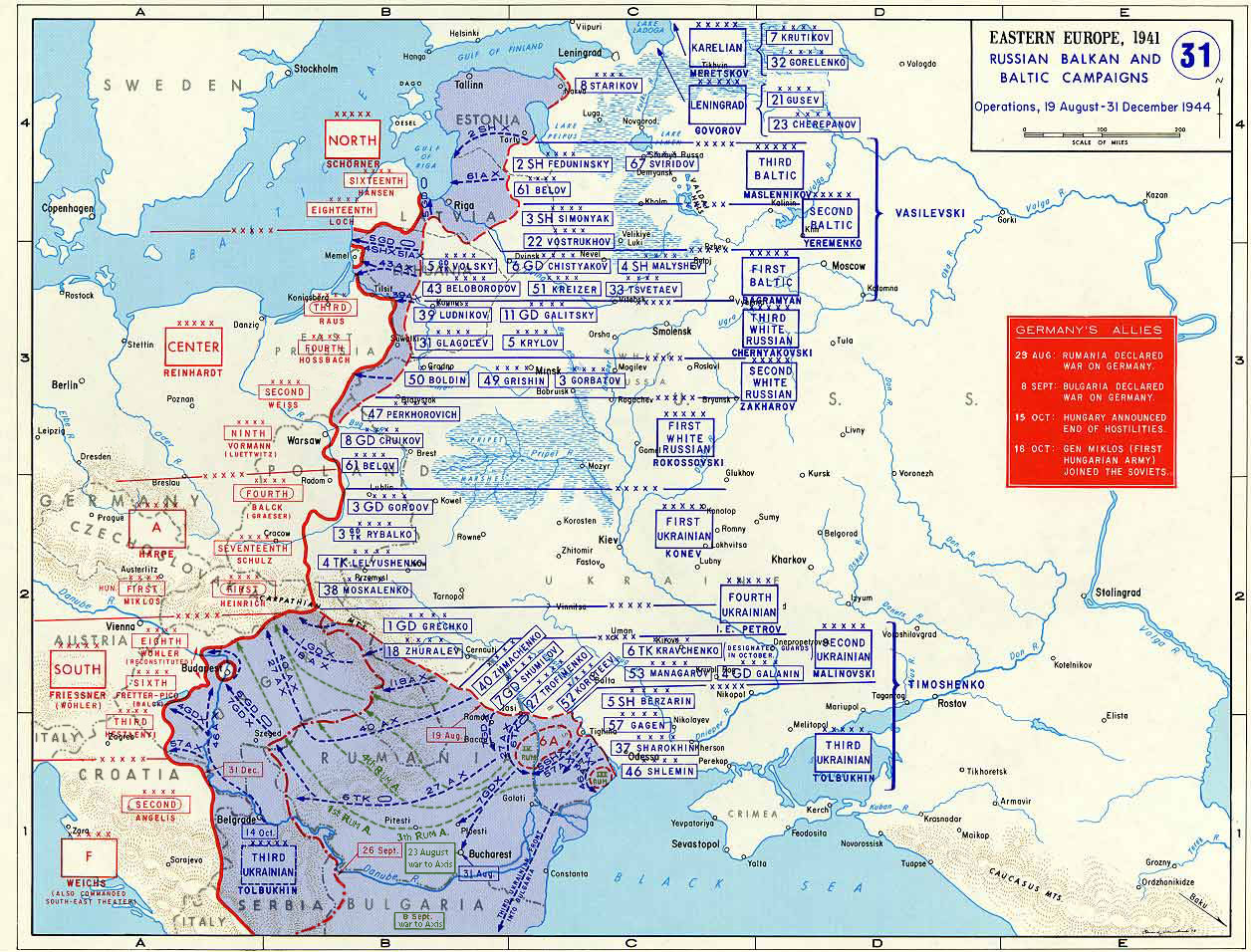
- Red Army operations in the Baltics and the Balkans, August 19 – December 31, 1944
Date	August 30 – October 3, 1944
Location	Romania
Result	Soviet–Romanian victory

Belligerents
Union of Soviet Socialist Republics; Romania	Germany; Hungary

Commanders and leaders
Rodion Malinovskiy; Gheorghe Avramescu	Johannes Frießner; Lajos Veress

Strength
Union of Soviet Socialist Republics: 681,556 people; Kingdom of Romania: 138,000+ people	Unknown

Casualties and losses
Union of Soviet Socialist Republics: 8,447 irrecoverable; 46,839 sanitary; Kingdom of Romania: 30,000–40,000 total	Nazi Germany and the Kingdom of Hungary: 100,000+ killed; 18,000+ prisoners; (according to Soviet data)

The Bucharest–Arad Offensive was a frontline military operation of Soviet and Romanian Troops against the Wehrmacht and Hungarian Troops, conducted from August 30 to October 3, 1944, during the Great Patriotic War, as a result of which almost all of Romania was liberated from German–Hungarian Troops.

== Military–strategic situation ==
The defeat of German Troops in the Iași–Kishinyov Operation and the victory of the August Uprising in Romania created favorable conditions for the subsequent offensive of Soviet Troops in the Southwestern Strategic Direction. The continuous front of German Troops was torn apart over a large area, and enemy troops retreated in diverging directions: some German Troops tried to fight their way into Bulgaria and Yugoslavia, while others tried to retreat into the Carpathians. The Red Army had a wide operational space before it, and the Supreme High Command Headquarters sought to make the most of this unique opportunity.

In Romania itself, a powerful anti–fascist patriotic upsurge was observed. Contrary to the expectations of a number of Soviet leaders, the Romanian Army as a whole reacted positively to the withdrawal from the war on the side of Germany and the transition to the side of the Soviet Troops; the resistance of pro–German officers was reduced to desertion and flight to the location of German Troops, and there were cases of their suicide. On the contrary, Romanian military personnel provided assistance to Soviet Troops en masse and on their own initiative. However, the entourage of King Michael I and the High Command of the Romanian Army sought to avoid active action against the German Troops, to ensure that they could peacefully leave Romania. Moreover, the new Romanian Government of Constantin Sănătescu made every effort to persuade the Western Allies to transfer American and British Troops to Bucharest.

On August 26, the Bulgarian Government hastily declared complete neutrality, which ruled out the entry of Bulgarian Troops into the war on Hitler's side. On August 29, due to military defeats, a government crisis occurred in Hungary, and the Slovak National Uprising began in Slovakia.

The military situation was as follows: the Southern Wing of the German Army Group South Ukraina had ceased to exist, its remnants in the form of scattered units had fled to Bulgaria, on the Northern Wing the Army Group Command had no more than 6 divisions left, some of which had already suffered significant losses, and up to 300 aircraft. There were 8 Hungarian divisions and brigades in Transylvania, as well as 30 border battalions. There were another 8 Hungarian divisions and brigades located directly in Hungary (from which the formation of the 2nd Hungarian Army began hastily) and some of the troops could be transferred to Romania from the central Carpathians, where the 1st Hungarian Army was defending itself. From Army Groups F and E operating in Greece and the Balkans, the German Command could transfer several German divisions to Romania (moreover, such a transfer was hastily prepared), but in the current situation this would take time. The only way to stop the Soviet Troops before a continuous front could be restored was to take advantage of the favorable terrain conditions in the Southern Carpathians and capture all the mountain passes there.

On the other hand, on the border with Transylvania there were 20 Romanian divisions (the 1st and 4th Romanian Armies), which the new Romanian Government gave orders to disarm all German units that had not left Romania, and to engage in combat with them in the event of Hungarian and German Troops entering the country. However, these rear armies were staffed mainly by inexperienced recruits and older soldiers, were very poorly armed and had virtually no tanks.

Taking into account the situation, on August 29, the Supreme High Command Headquarters ordered the 3rd Ukrainian Front (commanded by General of the Army, from September 12 – Marshal of the Soviet Union Fyodor Tolbukhin) to occupy the Romanian–Bulgarian border and prepare to begin military operations against Bulgaria.

The 2nd Ukrainian Front, under the command of General of the Army (from September 10 – Marshal of the Soviet Union) Rodion Malinovskiy, with the forces of the 27th Army, 53rd Army, and 6th Tank Army, was to bypass the Southern Carpathians along the Danube Plain and reach the border with Hungary and Yugoslavia west of Giurgiu, then advance in the general direction of Slatina – Turnu Severin, reaching these cities by September 7–8. The right wing of the front (7th Guards Army, 40th Army) was to advance on Satu Mare, bypassing the Carpathians from the east. The number of troops of the 2nd Ukrainian Front at the beginning of the operation was 681,556 people. In front of the right flank of the 2nd Ukrainian Front, the solid German front had collapsed, but in front of the left wing and partly in front of the center, a stable defense was preserved, based on the convenient mountainous and wooded terrain of the Carpathians.

The German Command, in turn, intended to restore a continuous front between Army Group South Ukraina and Army Group F along the line of the Eastern and Southern Carpathians – Western Balkans. To this end, the 2nd Hungarian Army was ordered to begin an offensive from Cluj – Turda in a southerly direction no later than September 5 with the aim of capturing the passes through the Southern Carpathians.

== Beginning of the operation: a dash to the west ==
Taking advantage of the favorable situation, the troops of the 2nd Ukrainian Front began a new offensive operation on August 30, 1944, the day after the completion of the Iași–Kishinyov Operation. On August 31, the advance detachment of Soviet Troops entered Bucharest without a fight (almost immediately, Soviet Troops were withdrawn from Bucharest for political reasons). Pursuing the broken and scattered German units, by September 5, in the direction of the main attack, they reached the line Câmpulung – Pitești – Caracal – Zimnicea, having advanced 80 – 140 kilometers, and the forward units of the 6th Tank Army reached the Dunay to the border of Yugoslavia near the city of Turnu Severin. On the right wing of the front, the 40th and 7th Guards Armies advanced only 15–20 kilometers during this time, breaking through the defensive lines created there in advance. Here the German Troops put up stubborn resistance.

The entry of Soviet Troops into Bucharest on August 31, 1944

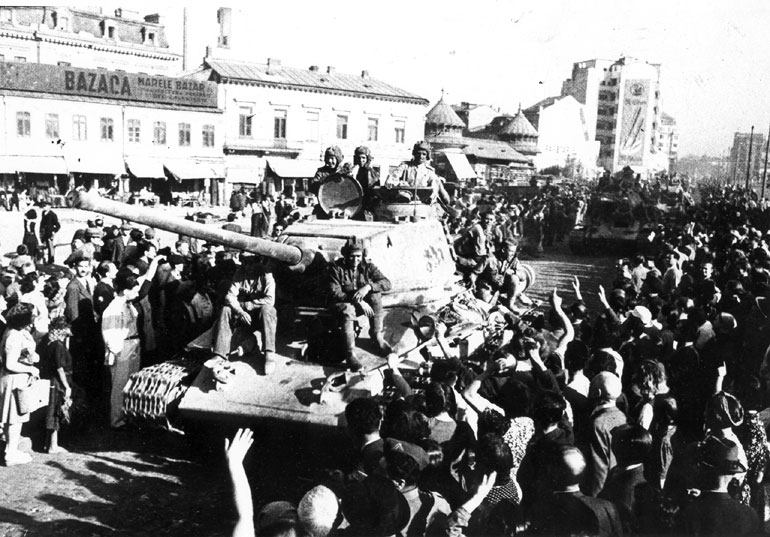

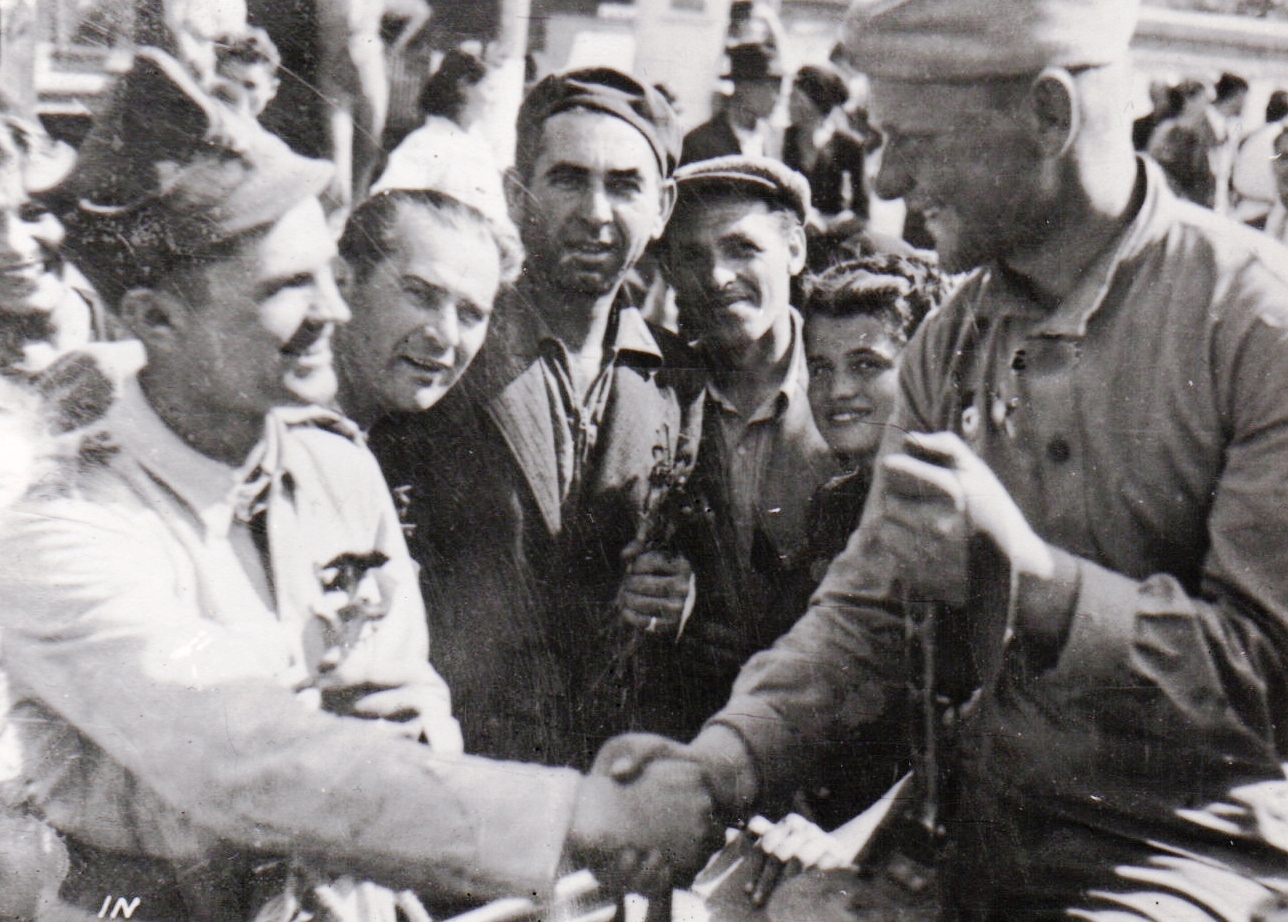

Acting on orders from the German Command, on the morning of September 5, the 2nd Hungarian Army (commander Colonel General Lajos Veress, 6 Hungarian and German divisions) attacked the forward units of the 4th Romanian Army (commander Corps General Gheorghe Avramescu) from the Turda Region and in two days advanced 20–30 kilometers to the south, and in the following days – up to 50 kilometers. Its task was to occupy the passes through the Southern Carpathians and lock them until the Soviet Troops arrived. The main forces of the 4th Romanian Army were located much further south, which created the threat of enemy troops occupying northern and central Romania.

To avoid disunity in the actions of the Soviet and Romanian Troops, on September 6, the 1st and 4th Romanian Armies, the 4th and 6th Romanian Army Corps (over 138 thousand people, 580 guns) and the 1st Romanian Air Corps (113 serviceable aircraft) were transferred to the operational subordination of the command of the 2nd Ukrainian Front.

== Second phase of the operation: turning north ==
In this situation, on September 6, the Commander of the 2nd Ukrainian Front, Rodion Malinovskiy, ordered the 6th Tank Army, commanded by Colonel General of Tank Troops Andrey Kravchenko, to make a sharp turn north and liberate the Dej – Cluj – Sărmășel Region by September 12. The 27th Army received the same order, and the 53rd Army was to turn northwest and occupy the Brad – Lugoj Line. These tasks were also successfully completed: the 6th Tank Army marched 250 kilometers at a rapid pace and by the evening of September 11 reached the positions where the 4th Romanian Army was defending itself. Without an operational pause, the Soviet–Romanian Troops launched a counteroffensive here and by September 13 had pushed the 2nd Hungarian Army back to its original position, occupying Cluj on September 12. By the end of the day on September 15, the 27th Soviet and 4th Romanian Armies reached the Târgu Mureș – Turda Line, but the fighting on this line became protracted. To the west, the 53rd Army covered 220 kilometers in 7 days and occupied the Caransebeș Area. In the Eastern Carpathians, the 40th and 7th Guards Armies were able to break the resistance of German Troops during these days, accelerated the pace of the offensive and advanced up to 130 kilometers. At the same time, battles continued to destroy scattered groups of German Troops attempting to break out of the encirclement near Iași.

Overall, by September 15, the 2nd Ukrainian Front had almost completely reached the Romanian–Hungarian border established by the Vienna Arbitration. By that time, the German Command had managed to create a new front line along it, on which there were 27 German and Hungarian divisions and brigades, including 6 tank and motorized divisions. Moreover, on this day, the enemy, with the forces of the 6th German Army (commanded by Artillery General Maximilian Fretter–Pico) and the 3rd Hungarian Army (commanded by General József Heszlényi), made a new attempt at a counteroffensive on Arad and Timișoara with the aim of preventing the approaching troops of the left wing of the 2nd Ukrainian Front from entering the Middle Danube Lowland. Here, in three days, the enemy pushed back units of the 1st Romanian Army (commanded by Corps General Nicolae Macici) by 30–50 kilometers, occupied Arad and reached the approaches to Timișoara.

== Third phase of the operation: battles on the approaches to Hungary ==
However, the Supreme High Command Headquarters still assessed Army Group South Ukraina as defeated and ordered the 2nd Ukrainian Front to launch a main attack in the direction of Cluj – Debrecen – Miskolc with the task of reaching the pre–war Romanian–Hungarian border, and then approaching the Tisza in the Chop – Szolnok Sector and assisting the 4th Ukrainian Front, whose offensive was developing slowly (see East Carpathian Operation), to overcome the Carpathians and capture the Uzhhorod Region.

But this plan was not fully implemented. By September 15, the enemy had managed to re–establish a continuous front from Ukraina to Yugoslavia. Although Soviet units went on the offensive and pushed back the enemy, the German Command also transferred four divisions, including two tank divisions, to the Cluj – Turda Area. The troops of the 2nd Ukrainian Front were already confronted by 27 German and Hungarian divisions and brigades, including 6 tank and motorized divisions. Both sides continuously attacked and counterattacked each other. This battle ended with a minor advance by the Soviet–Romanian forces: they repelled the enemy's counterattacking units and on September 22 reached the Romanian–Hungarian border in the area of the city of Makó and to the northeast of it. The next day, the 18th Tank Corps and the 243rd Rifle Division entered Hungary. On the left wing of the front, the 53rd Army, together with the 1st Romanian Army, acted more successfully; on September 21, they liberated the large city of Arad and on September 24, they also reached the old Romanian–Hungarian border.

Under these conditions, Malinovskiy raised the question of changing the direction of the main attack from the center to the left wing, launching an attack from here in the northern direction and temporarily moving the front troops to the defensive in preparation for a new, Debrecen Offensive Operation. On September 25, the corresponding permission was received from Headquarters. On September 24, the front suspended its offensive and began regrouping its forces (the end date of the operation, according to Krivosheev's work, is considered to be October 3, 1944).

== Results ==
As a result of the operation, almost all of Romania was liberated from German–Hungarian Troops; the last small northern regions were liberated in October 1944 during the Debrecen Operation. The starting areas for the offensive into Hungary and Yugoslavia were occupied. Large industrial areas and railways, as well as powerful Romanian oil fields, fell into the hands of Soviet Troops with almost no destruction. The advance of the front troops ranged from 250 to 500 kilometers. To restore the front, the enemy had to transfer 20 divisions to Romania, including 4 tank and 1 motorized division, and 2 tank brigades. Soviet and Romanian Troops gained experience in successfully conducting joint combat operations. Overall, the Romanian Army demonstrated high combat qualities in this complex, dynamic and tense operation, which contrasted sharply with its recent unsuccessful combat operations against the Soviet Troops under Antonescu.

== Losses of the parties ==
The losses of the Soviet Troops in this operation were relatively small: during the month of fighting, they amounted to 8,447 irretrievable and 46,839 sanitary casualties. The exact losses of the Romanian Troops in this operation are unknown, but judging by the fact that from August 23 to October 30 its losses amounted to more than 58.3 thousand people in total losses, it can be assumed that in September 1944 the Romanian Army lost from 30 thousand to 40 thousand people killed and wounded.

The losses of the German–Hungarian Troops are known only from the data of the Soviet Command: over 100 thousand were killed and over 18 thousand were captured. The extent of this is illustrated by the fact that in September 1944, two German generals were killed in battle in Romania, eight were captured, and one shot himself.

== Remembrance ==
The liberation of Romania was reflected in postage stamps.

Gallery

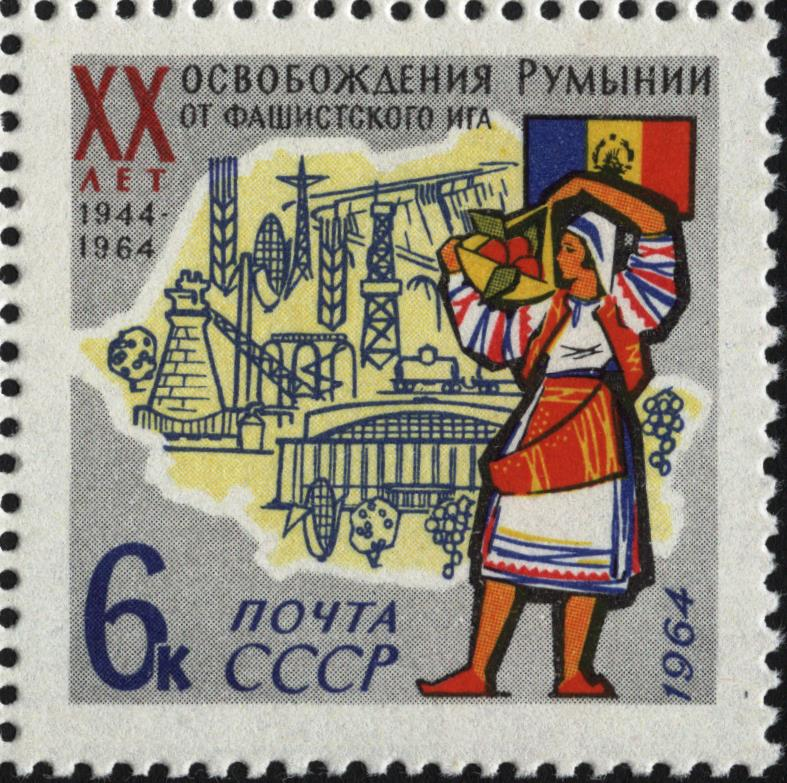
Postage stamp of the Union of Soviet Socialist Republics, 1964. 20th Anniversary of the Liberation of Romania from Fascist Occupation. Romanian peasant woman with a basket of fruit. The background is an industrial landscape within the outline of a map of Romania and the national flag of the Romanian People's Republic

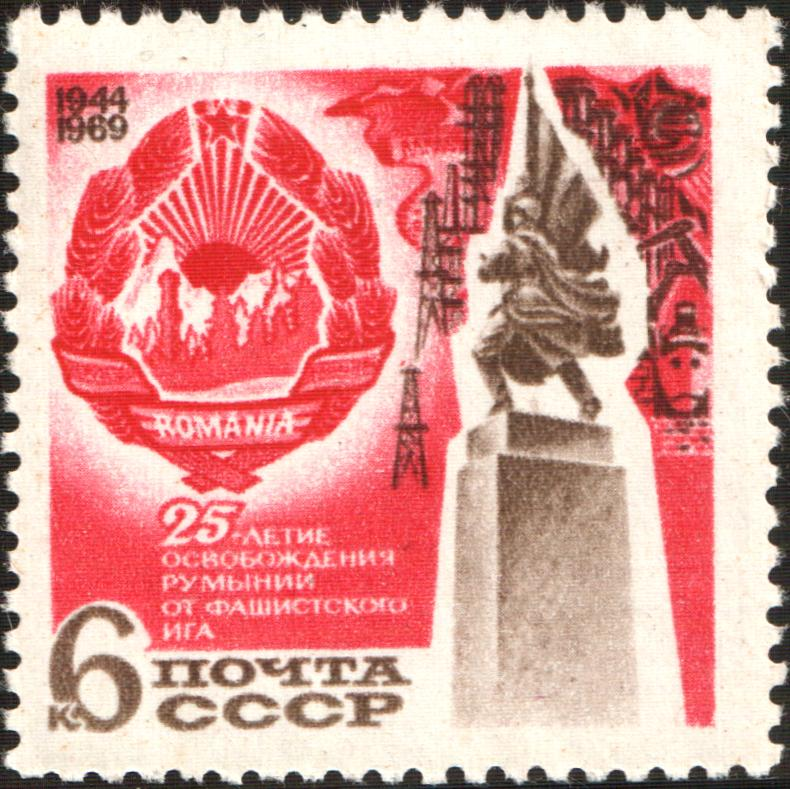
Postage stamp of the Union of Soviet Socialist Republics, 1969. 25th Anniversary of the Liberation of Romania from Fascist Occupation

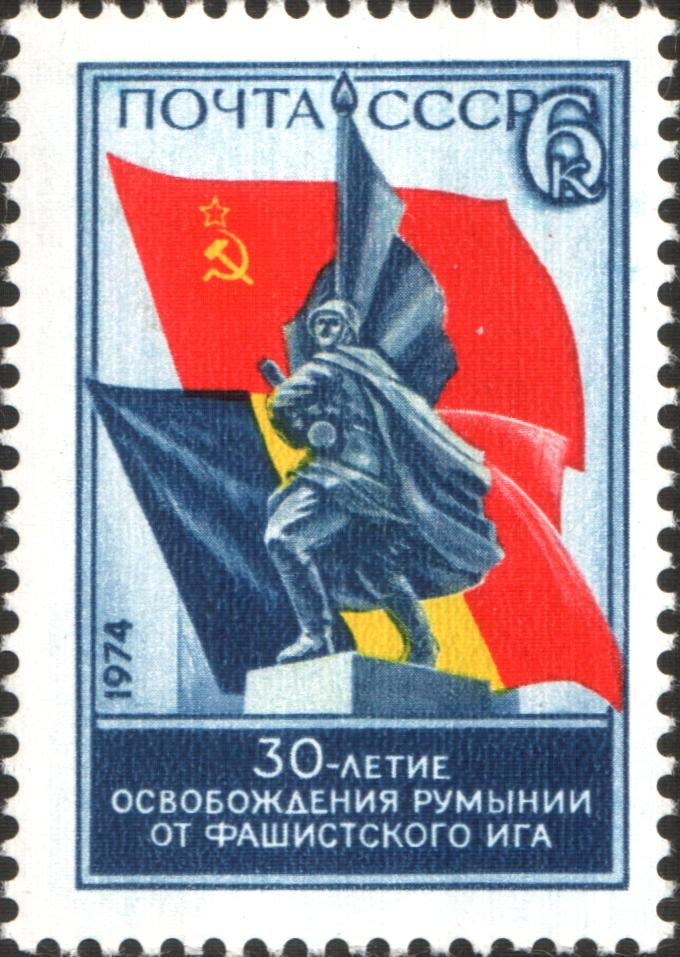
Postage stamp of the Union of Soviet Socialist Republics, 1974. 30th Anniversary of the Liberation of Romania from Fascist Occupation

== Sources ==
- The Great Patriotic War (1941–1945): in 12 Volumes. Volume 5. The Victorious Finale. The Final Operations of the Great Patriotic War in Europe. The War with Japan. Moskva: Kuchkovo Pole, 2013. Pages 112–125
- The Great Patriotic War, Unclassified. Book of Losses / Grigoriy Krivosheev (Director), Vladimir Andronikov, Pyotr Burikov, Vladimir Gurkin; edited by Grigoriy Krivosheev and Aleksandr Kirilin. Moskva: Veche, 2010. 384 Pages. ISBN 978-5-9533-4695-5
- Liberation of Southeastern and Central Europe by the Troops of the 2nd and 3rd Ukrainian Fronts (1944–1945). Moskva: Nauka, 1970
