= Kuybyshev, Volgograd Oblast =

Kuybyshev Куйбышев
- Settlement
- Location within Volgograd Oblast Location within Russia
- Coordinates: 48°40′N 44°51′E
- Country: Russia
- Region: Volgograd Oblast
- District: Sredneakhtubinsky District
- Time zone: UTC+4:00

Kuybyshev (Russian: Куйбышев) is a rural locality (a settlement) and the administrative center of Kuybyshevskoye Rural Settlement, Sredneakhtubinsky District, Volgograd Oblast, Russia. The population was 2,468 as of 2010. There are 44 streets.

== Geography ==
Kuybyshev is located on the right bank of the Akhtuba River, 6 km south of Srednyaya Akhtuba (the district's administrative centre) by road. Srednyaya Akhtuba is the nearest rural locality.
