= 227th Rifle Division =

227th Rifle Division (March 1, 1941 - July 13, 1942) 227th Rifle Division (August 23, 1943 - July 1946)
- Active: 1941–1946
- Country: Soviet Union
- Branch: Red Army
- Type: Infantry
- Size: Division
- Engagements: Operation Barbarossa; Battle of Kiev (1941); Kursk-Oboyan operation Second Battle of Kharkov; Case Blue; Kuban bridgehead Kerch–Eltigen operation Crimean offensive Second Jassy–Kishinev offensive Budapest offensive Siege of Budapest; Bratislava–Brno offensive Prague offensive Soviet invasion of Manchuria
- Decorations: Order of the Red Banner (2nd formation)
- Battle honours: Temryuk (2nd formation)

Commanders
- Notable commanders: Col. Fyodor Vasilievich Maltsev; Col. Efrem Fyodoseevich Makarchuk; Col. Gevork Andreevich Ter-Gasparian; Maj. Gen. Georgii Nikolaevich Preobrazhenskii; Col. Stepan Zotovich Petrov

The 227th Rifle Division was an infantry division of the Red Army, originally formed in the months just before the start of the German invasion, based on the shtat (table of organization and equipment) of September 13, 1939. It arrived at the front in July and was assigned to 26th Army along the Dniepr, but was fortunate to escape that Army's encirclement in September. During the next several months, the division fought as part of 40th Army in the Kursk region, operating toward Prokhorovka and Oboyan during the winter counteroffensive. It made noteworthy gains during the May 1942 offensive north of Kharkiv but these went for naught when the southern wing of the offensive collapsed. When the main German summer offensive began in late June, the division's 21st Army was directly in the path of the German 6th Army and the depleted 227th was soon destroyed on the open steppes.

A new 227th was formed in August 1943 in North Caucasian Front on the basis of two rifle brigades in 9th Army. In early October, it earned a battle honor for its part in the liberation of Temryuk. It landed in the Crimea in November as part of 56th Army (soon redesignated as Separate Coastal Army) and after the main offensive began in April 1944 it was awarded the Order of the Red Banner and all three of its rifle regiments would win battle honors for the liberation of Sevastopol in May. In August, it rejoined the active front as part of 7th Guards Army in 2nd Ukrainian Front. After taking part in the campaign that drove Romania out of the Axis, it advanced into Hungary, eventually taking part in the operations that encircled and reduced Budapest. Following this the 227th advanced with 53rd Army into Czechoslovakia and after the German surrender it was moved with the rest of this Army to the far east where it was intended to take part in the Soviet invasion of Manchuria, although in the event it saw little, if any, actual combat. It remained in the far east until July 1946 when it was disbanded.

== 1st Formation ==
The division began forming on March 1, 1941 at Slavyansk in the Kharkov Military District. When completed it had the following order of battle:

- 777th Rifle Regiment
- 789th Rifle Regiment
- 794th Rifle Regiment
- 678th Light Artillery Regiment
- 711th Howitzer Artillery Regiment (until October 4, 1941)
- 72nd Antitank Battalion
- 410th Antiaircraft Battery (later 235th Antiaircraft Battalion)
- 536th Mortar Battalion (from November 20, 1941)
- 305th Reconnaissance Battalion
- 395th Sapper Battalion
- 604th Signal Battalion
- 371st Medical/Sanitation Battalion
- 325th Chemical Defense (Anti-gas) Company
- 699th Motor Transport Company
- 356th Field Bakery
- 53rd Divisional Veterinary Hospital
- 656th Field Postal Station
- 581st Field Office of the State Bank

Col. Fyodor Vasilievich Maltsev was appointed to command on the day the division began forming. On June 22 the 227th was assigned to the 45th Rifle Corps, unattached to any Army, in the Reserve of the Supreme High Command, but by July 1 it had been left behind in the Kharkov Military District as the Corps went forward to the front; even after four months it was not completely formed or equipped. On the same date Colonel Maltsev was succeeded in command by Col. Efrem Fyodoseevich Makarchuk. By July 10 the division had been placed "at the disposal of the Southwestern Direction", which consisted of the Southwestern and Southern Fronts. It soon settled in the former Front as part of 26th Army along the Dniepr River in the Cherkasy–Kaniv area.

=== Battle of Kiev ===
At the beginning of September, as the German operation started that would eventually encircle most of Southwestern Front, the 227th was still on the Dniepr, sparring with its artillery against elements of 17th Army on the west bank. On the 5th it began moving east toward Romodan because it still had a prewar shtat and assets that had to be reorganized and redistributed. On October 4 the 76mm cannon and crews of the 678th Light Artillery were removed to form a separate antitank regiment while its command cadre went to the 711th which had its 152mm howitzers placed under higher command and was then converted to a standard divisional artillery regiment with a mix of 76mm cannon and 122mm howitzers. This move undoubtedly saved it from the fate of the rest of 26th Army which was largely surrounded and destroyed by mid-September. By the end of the month the division was under command of 40th Army to the west of Mykolaivka. On October 1 Colonel Makarchuk was succeeded in command by Col. Gevork Andreevich Ter-Gasparian. Makarchuk would go on to command the 91st and 302nd Rifle Divisions before he was killed in an air attack in January 1943. Ter-Gasparian had previously commanded the 55th Rifle Division and would remain in command for the duration of the 1st formation.

=== Kursk-Oboyan Operation ===
By the start of November 40th Army had fallen back to the vicinity of Kursk and was attempting to hold an extensive line with just two rifle divisions (227th and 293rd), two rifle regiments and three airborne brigades. At the time the main battles were near Moscow and Rostov-na-Donu and the German 2nd Army also had limited forces along this front. During this period most of the division's rifle regiments' mortars were gathered together to form the 536th Mortar Battalion.

The right wing forces of Southwestern Front began the Kursk-Oboyan operation on December 20 as part of the overall Soviet winter counteroffensive. By the end of the month the 227th had been transferred to the 21st Army. From the outset the division was tasked with taking Prokhorovka, and especially its railway station, but although the village was occupied the station held out. During these battles one battalion of the 777th Rifle Regiment, under command of Sr. Lt. Khachatur Beglyarovich Melikyan, staged a daring 40km raid behind German lines beginning on January 5, 1942. The battalion seized four German-held positions: the village of Orlovka; the farms of Zorinsky Dvory and Vesely in the Ivnyan district; and Peresyp in the Oboyan district. In the fighting near Oboyan alone the battalion accounted for 21 German vehicles with ammunition, two batteries of artillery, eight machine guns and 22 rifles. On January 8 Melikyan was killed in action at Oboyan. On November 5, 1942 he would be posthumously awarded the title of Hero of the Soviet Union. In March the 227th was briefly moved to 38th Army but it soon returned to 21st Army for the next offensive.

== Second Battle of Kharkov ==
Southwestern Front began regrouping its forces at the end of March. This was a complex process made more difficult by the arrival of the spring rasputitsa. The division had been in the Pyatnitskoye area while with 38th Army but it now shifted south to join the shock group being formed by 21st Army. While in the former Army it had been involved in an operation in the Staryi Saltiv area which had created a bridgehead on the west bank of the Donets River but had suffered losses and required rest and replenishment before the new offensive could begin. The shock group would also include the 293rd and 76th Rifle Divisions and was supported by the 10th Tank Brigade plus the 338th Light, 538th Heavy, and 135th and 156th Artillery Regiments. The remainder of 21st Army would not be actively involved in the offensive so the shock group formed the northern wing of Southwestern Front's attack, with the 227th adjacent to 28th Army to its south.

The offensive began at 0630 hours on May 12 with a 60-minute artillery preparation, during the last 15-20 minutes of which Soviet air attacks struck German artillery positions and strongpoints in the main defensive belt. The infantry and direct support tanks kicked off at 0730. While the 28th Army was expected to make the greatest progress due to having the most armor support, in the event its attacks made minimal progress while 21st and 38th Armies made greater gains. All three divisions of the 21st Army's shock group forced crossings of the Donets; the 227th and 293rd penetrated the defensive belt and by the end of the day had captured Ohirtseve, Bugrovatka and Starytsya, having advanced 10 kilometers (6.2 miles) to the north and 6-8km to the northwest. The 293rd was unable to link up with the 76th to form one general bridgehead. The defending 294th Infantry Division took significant losses during the day.

On May 13, while the 293rd and 76th achieved their link-up they made little additional progress. The 227th, on the other hand, bypassed the German positions at Murom from the south, advanced as much as 12km with support of 10th Tank Brigade and captured a line from Hill 217 to Vysokii. Due to the lagging attack of the northern forces of 28th Army the division was increasingly vulnerable to attack from three sides. The following day the division left one rifle battalion to hold Hill 217 as the 293rd attempted to surround and reduce Murom. The remainder of the division continued pushing westward, routing German units and advancing another 6km and capturing the villages of Vergelevka and Pylnaya, aided by the 28th Army's forces finally gaining traction. Meanwhile the right-flank forces of 38th Army were being counterattacked by the 3rd and 23rd Panzer Divisions out of Kharkiv. During the day Colonel Ter-Gasparian was wounded and evacuated, handing over his command to Col. G. M. Zaitsev.

As the German counteroffensive developed on May 15 the 21st Army's shock group and the north flank forces of 28th Army continued to press their attacks northeast of Kharkiv. Meeting increasing resistance, these were unsuccessful; in particular the newly-arriving 168th Infantry Division moved to stave off the loss of Murom. The next day the 21st Army commander, Lt. Gen. V. N. Gordov, was ordered to carry out his earlier assigned missions. As a result of the operations of his division's forward detachments Colonel Zaitsev realized that the German forces on his front had fallen back to the line of the Kharkiv River. Taking advantage of this withdrawal the 227th, along with the neighboring 175th Rifle Division of 28th Army, advanced to the west bank of the Lipets River and the villages of Ustinka, Morokhovets and Bednyi. Lead elements of the division pushed nearly as far as the town of Cheremoshnoe before running into the 168th. This would prove to be the deepest penetration made by the northern group of Soviet forces in this offensive.

These gains proved to be short-lived as on May 17 Marshal S. K. Timoshenko, commander of Southwestern Direction, decided to halt further offensive activity by 21st Army in favor of redeploying the shock group to new positions running from Krasnaya Alekseeva to Pylnaya; this was largely due to ongoing pressure from the 168th Infantry. Also, by this time the 1st Panzer Army's attack against Southern Front's positions in the Izium–Barvinkove salient were well underway and Timoshenko's entire offensive was facing disaster. Three Soviet armies were encircled there by May 24 and soon destroyed. The 227th escaped this fate, but had been significantly depleted during the offensive.

== Case Blue ==
In the wake of this offensive the 227th, now back under command of Colonel Ter-Gasparian, was redeployed northward, still in 21st Army, to positions northeast of Belgorod. As a result it missed the preliminary operations of the main German summer offensive. On June 28 it was facing the XXIX Army Corps on the north flank of German 6th Army. The division was in the Army's first echelon, along the Oskol River, with little support in the second echelon. The German attack planned to collapse the 28th Army and drive it southward, after which the 21st and 40th Armies would be encircled and destroyed west of Voronezh. By June 30 the 227th, along with the 301st Rifle Division and the 10th Tank Brigade had been pocketed southwest of Korocha. While individual soldiers and small groups were able to escape, by July 11 the German spearheads were over 150km east of the original Soviet lines and the division had ceased to exist. It was officially disbanded by the STAVKA on July 13. Colonel Ter-Gasparian escaped the debacle and went on to command the 96th Rifle Division, then to serve as chief of staff of 60th Army as a major general, and rose to the rank of lieutenant general in 1949.

== 2nd Formation ==
A new 227th was officially formed on August 23, 1943 in the 9th Army in North Caucasian Front, based on two rifle brigades.

=== 19th Rifle Brigade ===
This had been formed from September to November 1941 at Tambov in the Oryol Military District with the following order of battle:

- 1st, 2nd, 3rd Rifle Battalions, each with seven or more 82mm mortars;
- Antitank Battalion (eight 57mm ZiS-2 guns)
- Artillery Battalion (mixed 76mm and 45mm guns)

It was a "student" brigade, based on personnel from the Oryol District training establishment. It was sent to the Volga Military District in November to finish gathering its personnel and heavy weapons before being assigned to Western Front in December. It entered the fighting as part of 49th Army at Serpukhov. In February 1942 the brigade was transferred to 16th Army which had been moved to the Sukhinichi area in an effort to overcome a German position there that was blocking the Soviet advance toward Spas-Demensk and Roslavl. In April the 19th Brigade was assigned to 5th Guards Rifle Corps in the same Army and it stayed in that Corps until July 6 when it was pulled out of this Front and began moving by rail southward to Astrakhan.

After being ferried across the Caspian Sea to the Transcaucasus the brigade was assigned to the reserves of Transcaucasian Front and then to 9th Army in the Front's Northern Group, defending the line of the Terek River. In November the 19th joined 11th Rifle Corps in 9th Army. As the fighting moved north after the battle of Stalingrad the Army became part of North Caucasian Front in January 1943. From February to August the brigade faced the northern part of the Kuban bridgehead (Gotenkopfstellung) held by German 17th Army. In July its order of battle was as follows:

- 3 rifle battalions
- 1 submachine gun (assault) battalion
- 1 machine gun battalion
- 1 mortar battalion (120mm mortars)
- 1 antitank battalion (45mm guns)
- 1 artillery battalion (76mm cannon)

It was soon merged with the 84th Naval Rifle Brigade to create the new 227th.

=== 84th Naval Rifle Brigade ===
The 84th formed during October/November 1941 in the Volga Military District, at Ulyanovsk, Ufa and Kuibyshev, based on a cadre from the Black Sea Fleet. On November 27 it detrained at Rzazhske Station near Moscow and it was soon assigned to the new 1st Shock Army of Western Front, with which it went over to the offensive on December 6. The 84th remained in 1st Shock until the Army was transferred to Northwestern Front; in March it went into 11th Army, and later 27th Army, both of which were involved in the dismal battles on the north flank of the Demyansk Pocket. It left the latter Army in August and followed a similar path to that of the 19th Brigade until it also reached the 11th Corps of 9th Army along the Terek River line in November. By early 1943 it consisted of:

4 rifle battalions, each with -

- 4 rifle companies
- 1 mortar company (82mm)
- 1 machine gun company
- 1 antitank rifle company
- 1 sapper company
- 1 signal platoon

Artillery battalion (76mm and 122mm, partly motorized); Mortar battalion; Machine Gun battalion; Antitank battalion (3 batteries of 45mm guns, 1 antitank rifle company); Sapper company; Signal platoon. The brigade remained in this configuration and under these commands until it merged with the 19th Brigade.

The new division came under command of Col. Ivan Vasilevich Terekhin on the day it formed. Its order of battle, based on the shtat of December 10, 1942, was similar to that of the 1st formation:

- 570th Rifle Regiment
- 777th Rifle Regiment
- 779th Rifle Regiment
- 711th Artillery Regiment
- 524th Self-propelled Artillery Battalion (from August 9, 1945)
- 72nd Antitank Battalion
- 305th Reconnaissance Company
- 395th Sapper Battalion
- 604th Signal Battalion (later 1456th Signal Company)
- 371st Medical/Sanitation Battalion
- 325th Chemical Defense (Anti-gas) Company
- 281st Motor Transport Company
- 553rd Field Bakery
- 53rd Divisional Veterinary Hospital
- 1632nd Field Postal Station
- 1622nd Field Office of the State Bank

=== Kuban Bridgehead ===
From April 1 to July 5 the 9th Army's efforts were focused on the liberation of the port of Temryuk, but although some ground was taken the defenders, primarily of the 50th Infantry Division, held on. From this point the fighting became a battle of attrition until just before the 227th was formed. On September 3 Hitler was finally convinced to evacuate the bridgehead in what would be called Operation Brunhild. It was not until three days later that the gradual withdrawal became clear to the commander of North Caucasian Front, Lt. Gen. I. Ye. Petrov, and he began to implement more aggressive measures to block it.

On the night of September 25/26 the Army mounted a major attack near the village of Kurchanskaya from the east in conjunction with a landing near Temryuk by a battalion of the 389th Rifle Division, but both were repulsed. The waterlogged terrain in the area prevented the use of tanks and made it difficult to bring heavy artillery forward. By now the evacuation was well underway and continued until October 9. On September 27 Colonel Terekhin was replaced in command and his successor's name appears in the following battle honor citation:

TEMRYUK... 227th Rifle Division (Col. Preobrazhenskii, Georgii Nikolaevich)... The troops participating in the battles for the liberation of the Taman Peninsula, during which they captured Temryuk and other settlements, by the order of the Supreme High Command of 9 October 1943, and a commendation in Moscow, are given a salute of 20 artillery salvoes from 224 guns.

This officer had previously served as deputy commander of 22nd Rifle Corps in 18th Army in the same Front, and as acting commander in March and April.

== Crimean Offensive ==
By the start of October the division had left 11th Corps but was still under 9th Army. Later that month the Army was effectively disbanded and its rifle divisions were redistributed, with the 227th going to the 16th Rifle Corps of 56th Army, still in North Caucasian Front. After two false starts this Army began landing operations overnight on November 3/4 on the west side of Kerch Strait, supported by heavy artillery fire from the east side. The 2nd and 55th Guards Rifle Divisions landed 4,000 men on the first day and significant reinforcements followed until the Army launched a major breakout effort on November 5-6, but this was contained. Days later the 56th was redesignated as Separate Coastal Army and on November 10 it attacked the German line again, driving it back up to 3km, and even with very limited tank support by the 12th it was on the outskirts of Kerch. At this point the situation became deadlocked for several months. In February 1944 Coastal Army came under command of Army Gen. A. I. Yeryomenko. During the same month the 227th was removed from 16th Corps and came under direct Army command, where it remained at the start of the main Crimean operation.

The overland aspect of the operation was entrusted to 4th Ukrainian Front's 2nd Guards and 51st Armies, while Coastal Army would initially be responsible pinning the German V Army Corps at Kerch before securing the Kerch Peninsula. The main attack began on April 8 and by the 10th the defending German and Romanian forces were falling back from the Perekop Isthmus and the Soviet bridgehead across the Syvash toward Sevastopol. Overnight the V Corps began its withdrawal from Kerch; it would have to cover 160km mostly along a single road to reach the same objective with the 10 rifle divisions and 204 tanks of Coastal Army on its heels. The Corps reached the Parpach Narrows on April 12 but could not attempt to hold there because 2nd Guards Army was closing on Simferopol, threatening its rear. The Corps commander, Gen. der Inf. K. Allmendinger, was ordered to reach Feodosia or Sudak for evacuation by sea.

April 13 saw the Soviet pursuit in full flood. General Yeryomenko formed a mobile group with the 227th and the 257th Tank Regiment in the lead and these reached and cleared Feodosia. The division would be awarded the Order of the Red Banner on April 24 for its role in this victory. The mobile group caught up with the tail end of Allmendinger's Corps near Staryi Krym and threatened to overwhelm the rearguard; Gebirgs-Jäger-Regiment Krim was ordered to take a stand in hilly terrain and sacrificed itself in temporarily halting the pursuit. This allowed about 10,000 troops of V Corps to reach Sudak for transport to Balaklava, coming under heavy air attacks in the process. The remainder had to continue the retreat through the Yaila Mountains. Much of the German horse-drawn artillery had to be abandoned because it could not keep pace through this terrain. Early on April 15 Yeryomenko's vanguard encircled and destroyed a Romanian rearguard of two battalions while the main body of V Corps reached Yalta. It arrived at the eastern outskirts of Sevastopol the following day, but the pursuit had cost it thousands of its troops, over 70 percent of its heavy weapons and the Corps was no longer combat-effective. The 227th occupied Yalta that day and later Bakhchysarai as well.

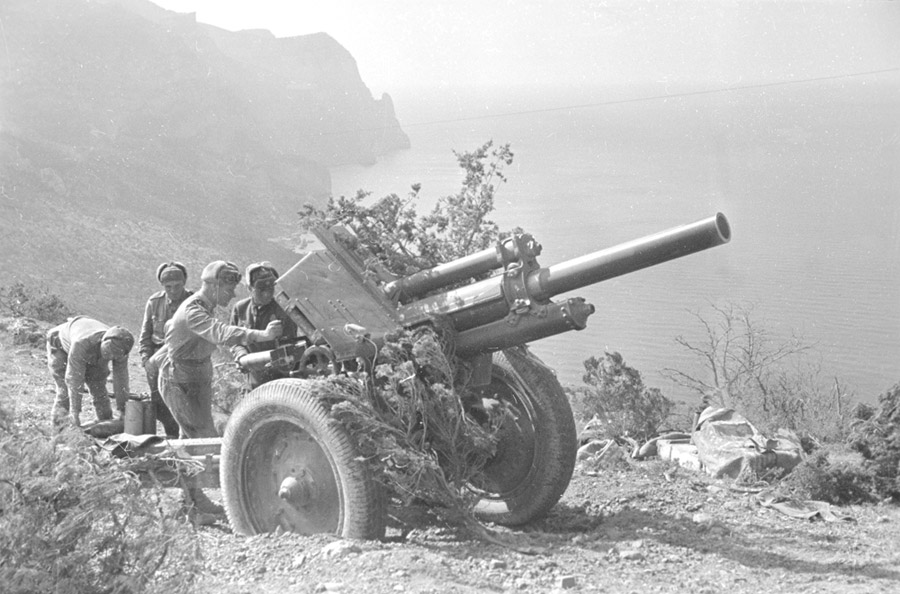
Starshina Nikifor Chmilenko's 122 mm howitzer crew of the division's 711th Artillery Regiment firing at German positions near Sevastopol, 4 May 1944

Sevastopol's defenses were no longer capable of supporting a prolonged battle for the port although this was not immediately apparent to the Soviet command. Despite Hitler's orders to hold, evacuations by sea of "non-essential personnel" began on April 12 but this included many who did not fit this definition. By the first of May the 227th was back in 16th Corps, and on the morning of May 7 the Corps attacked V Corps west of Balaklava following a very heavy artillery preparation and quickly achieved a penetration in the center of the sector held by the 73rd Infantry Division; V Corps was so badly damaged that it had no choice but to fall back to its second line. On May 8, following advances by 2nd Guards and 51st Armies as well, Hitler finally authorized a full evacuation. The next day 16th Corps, backed by 19th Tank Corps, crashed through the retreating 73rd Infantry and pursued into the Chersonese. This was mopped up the following day, and the three rifle regiments of the 227th won battle honors:

SEVASTOPOL... 570th Rifle Regiment (Lt. Col. Aleksandrov, Vasilii Aleksandrovich)... 777th Rifle Regiment (Lt. Col. Volinskii, Iosif Issakovich)... 779th Rifle Regiment (Maj. Duboshin, Aleksei Abramovich)... The troops participating in the battles for the liberation of Sevastopol, by the order of the Supreme High Command of 10 May 1944, and a commendation in Moscow, are given a salute of 24 artillery salvoes from 324 guns.

The Coastal Army remained in Crimea as a garrison force for the next few months. In recognition of his leadership of the division Colonel Preobrazhenskii was made a Hero of the Soviet Union on May 16 and promoted to the rank of major general on June 3.

== Into the Balkans ==
As of the beginning of August the 227th was still in 16th Corps of Coastal Army, but it soon began moving north to join 7th Guards Army in 2nd Ukrainian Front as a separate division. At the outset of the Second Jassy–Kishinev Offensive the division constituted the Army's reserve. Strategically the Army was to launch a supporting attack but with important objectives: in cooperation with Gorshkov's Cavalry-Mechanized Group it was to capture the town of Roman on the third day and Bacău on the fifth to unhinge Axis defenses along the Siret River. The 25th Guards Rifle Corps, backed by the 227th, would form the Army's shock group. Although the main offensive was to begin on August 20 the Army's attack was to wait until the neighboring 27th Army had broken the German front on its sector. A 30-minute artillery preparation would precede the attack.

27th Army's breakthrough came quickly and by 1100 hours it had forced the Bahlui River. By 1900 the 7th Guards' shock group had taken up its jumping-off positions along the left bank of this river. Its objective for August 21 was to seize the Târgu Frumos fortified area that had stymied 2nd Ukrainian Front during the spring. With the help of artillery assets transferred from 27th Army and the 23rd Tank Corps the shock group, led by 36th Guards Rifle Division, crushed Axis resistance and carried out its mission for the day, creating conditions for the commitment of Gorshkov's Group. The following day most of the 24th Guards Rifle Corps joined the offensive as the shock group continued in the direction of Roman, advancing through the night against Romanian forces retreating hastily to avoid encirclement. By the end of August 24 the shock group had reached the line Bacău–Racova–Bibirești–Bota.

=== Budapest Campaign ===
As 7th Guards Army entered the Balkans in September the 227th was still serving under direct Army command but in October it was assigned to 27th Guards Rifle Corps, still in the same Army, joining the 303rd Rifle Division. On October 28 the STAVKA directed the 2nd and 3rd Ukrainian Fronts to begin an offensive toward the Hungarian capital. 2nd Ukrainian planned to advance between the Danube and Tisza Rivers with the 46th Army and 2nd Guards Mechanized Corps to clear the west bank of the latter river, then cross 7th Guards Army to the east bank; subsequently it would advance on Budapest with 4th Guards Mechanized Corps.

The Army began its attack on October 30 with four rifle divisions, including the 227th, against elements of the reconstructed German 6th Army. It was expected to capture the line Szolnok–Abony–Hartany by the morning of November 2. In the event this timeline could not be met and it was November 4 when 27th Guards Corps stormed Szolnok, an important Axis strongpoint on the Tisza. On November 19 the 570th Rifle Regiment would be rewarded with the Order of the Red Banner, while the 777th Rifle Regiment and 395th Sapper Battalion were each awarded the Order of Alexander Nevsky. The German-Hungarian command was increasingly concerned that Budapest could be seized off the march and began transferring units of III Panzer Corps to this axis until it had concentrated a powerful grouping of about 200 tanks. While 46th Army and the two mechanized corps were halted on the outer ring of the city's defenses, 7th Guards Army pressed the offensive toward Jászapáti and Jászberény, but it was not until the 14th that the latter was partly captured by 27th Guards Corps.

With the failure to take Budapest by coup-de-main the STAVKA ordered it to be encircled and reduced. 7th Guards Army was to break through the Axis defense on December 5 on a front from Harvan to Aszód and attack in the direction of Verseg, Csővár and Nőtincs in order to support the commitment of 6th Guards Tank Army and Pliyev's Cavalry-Mechanized Group into the breakthrough. The artillery of 227th and 303rd Divisions would be supplemented with the 41st Cannon-Artillery Brigade and part of the guns of Pliyev's Group, for a total of 261 pieces (76mm or greater calibre). The attack began at 1015 hours and soon achieved a breakthrough, advancing as much as 8km during the day. Led by units of 6th Guards Tanks the Army continued at an average rate of about 16km per day until reaching the Danube between December 8-9 in the Vác area. In order to complete the encirclement of Budapest the Danube had to be forced and as a result of this success the 779th Rifle Regiment would be decorated with the Order of Suvorov, 3rd Degree, on January 6, 1945. By this time the 227th had been transferred to the 57th Rifle Corps in 53rd Army.

=== Into Czechoslovakia ===
In December both the 7th Guards and 53rd Armies had entered Slovakia in the Šahy area and along the Hron River. The 53rd pushed on toward Lučenec before going over to the defense in late February. The Bratislava–Brno Offensive began on March 25; by this time the division had left 57th Corps and was operation under direct Army command. The Army pushed through the hilly terrain of central Slovakia and crossed the Morava River near Hodonín on April 13; the 227th had by now returned to 57th Corps. On April 24 General Preobrazhenskii was directed to attend the K. Е. Voroshilov Higher Military Academy and he was replaced the next day by Col. Stepan Zotovich Petrov. This officer would remain in command for the duration of the war. Preobrazhenskii was appointed as deputy commander of 13th Rifle Corps in February 1946. He moved to the training establishment in April 1950 and retired to Moscow in 1955 before his death on March 19, 1958.

== Manchurian Campaign and Postwar ==
53rd Army was selected for transfer to the far east for the campaign against the Japanese Kwantung Army in Manchuria, largely due to its experience in fighting through the Carpathian Mountains during 1944-45. After crossing the continent via the Trans-Siberian Railway it joined Transbaikal Front but by the beginning of August the 227th was detached from the Army and was in reserve at the disposal of the Front. Although it had the 524th Self-propelled Artillery Battalion (SU-76s) added to its order of battle to provide more mobile firepower, in the event the division was not committed to combat.

By the conclusion of hostilities, the division had been awarded the full title of 227th Rifle, Temryuk, Order of the Red Banner Division (Russian: 227-я стрелковая Темрюкская Краснознамённая дивизия). The division was based in Krasnoyarsk with the 49th Rifle Corps, and was disbanded there in July 1946 to form the basis of the 49th Rifle Brigade.

In the early 1950s on the basis of the 227th Rifle Division the 74th Mechanised Division was established, which became the 74th Motor Rifle Division in June 1957. It was disbanded in March 1959.
