= Khokhol (selo) =

Rural locality in Voronezh Oblast, Russia

Khokhol Хохол
- Selo
- Location within Voronezh Oblast Location within Russia
- Coordinates: 51°33′N 38°45′E
- Country: Russia
- Region: Voronezh Oblast
- District: Khokholsky District
- Time zone: UTC+3:00

Khokhol (Russian: Хохол) is a rural locality (a selo) in Khokholskoye Urban Settlement, Khokholsky District, Voronezh Oblast, Russia. The population was 4,215 (2021 census); 4,512 as of 2010. There are 40 streets.

== Geography ==
Khokhol is located 5 km southeast of Khokholsky (the district's administrative centre) by road. Khokholsky is the nearest rural locality.
