= Zinovy Rogozny =

Soviet teacher (1901–1990)

Zinovy Zakharovich Rogozny
- Rogozny, postwar
- Born: 10 May 1901; Orsha, Russian Empire
- Died: 12 January 1990 (aged 88) Kiev, Soviet Union
- Allegiance: Russian SFSR; Soviet Union
- Branch: Red Army (later Soviet Army)
- Service years: 1919–1954
- Rank: Major general
- Commands: 64th Rifle Corps; 48th Rifle Corps
- Conflicts: Russian Civil War; World War II; Invasion of Poland; Winter War; Eastern Front
- Awards: Order of Lenin; Order of the Red Banner (5)

Zinovy Zakharovich Rogozny (Russian: Зиновий Захарович Рогозный; 10 May 1901 – 12 January 1990) was a Soviet Army major general who held corps command during World War II.

== Early life and Russian Civil War ==
Zinovy Zakharovich Rogozny was born on 10 May 1901 in Orsha to Jewish parents. During the Russian Civil War, he was conscripted into the Red Army in April 1919 and served as a Red Army man in the 1st Communist Shock Battalion. From August, he studied at the Smolensk Artillery Commanders' Course, and upon his graduation in December of that year became a battery communications chief in the 2nd Light Artillery Battalion. From April 1920 he served in the Consolidated Heavy Howitzer Artillery Battalion of the 45th Rifle Division as a battery communications chief, then as a platoon commander. With the battalion, he fought in battles on the Western Front.

== Interwar period ==
From December 1920 to April 1921, Rogozny studied at the Commanders' Course of the 14th Army, then returned to the 45th Rifle Division, now part of the 14th Rifle Corps of the Ukrainian Military District, serving as a platoon commander and assistant artillery battery commander in the 45th Howitzer Artillery Battalion, and as commander of a training platoon of the artillery school. From June 1922, he commanded a platoon, and was assistant commander and commander of an artillery battery of the division. In October 1924 Rogozny became chief of the regimental school, then a battalion commander in the 45th Light Artillery Regiment. From October 1925 to September 1926 he studied at the course of the special section of the Artillery Commanders Improvement Course at Detskoye Selo. In February 1928 he was appointed commander of a battery of the Odessa Artillery School, then entered the Frunze Military Academy in October of that year. After graduating in May 1931, Rogozny was appointed chief of staff of the 14th Corps Artillery Regiment of the 14th Rifle Corps. From November of that year, he served as chief of the 2nd sector of the Directorate of the Chief of Artillery of the Ukrainian Military District, and from February 1932 was chief of artillery of Chief Works Directorate No. 99 of the district.

Rogozny returned to the Frunze Academy for studies in its operational department between November 1934 and June 1935, then was appointed chief of artillery of the 45th Rifle Division. On 5 February 1936 he received the rank of major when the Red Army introduced individual ranks. From October 1936, he was chief of the 1st section of the 1st staff department of the artillery of the Kiev Military District, and from January 1938 served as chief of artillery, first of the 81st, then of the 15th Rifle Divisions of the same district. He was promoted to colonel on 17 February 1938. From April of that year Rogozny was chief of the district course for artillery junior lieutenants, and in January 1939 returned to his previous position as chief of artillery of the 81st Rifle Division. From August 1939, he was chief of staff of the 15th Rifle Corps of the Kiev Special Military District. In this position, he participated in the advance into what was annexed as western Ukraine during the Soviet invasion of Poland and the Winter War. Rogozny was promoted to kombrig on 4 November 1939, and his rank was converted to major general on 4 June 1940 when the Red Army introduced general officer ranks.

== World War II ==
After Operation Barbarossa began, Rogozny fought with the corps as part of the 5th Army of the Southwestern Front in battles in the area of Kovel and Korosten. From 22 July, he commanded the 64th Rifle Corps of the front in defensive operations on the approaches to Kiev in the area of Vasilkov. On 26 August he became chief of staff of the 40th Army. Between February and March 1942 Rogozny was acting commander of the army as part of the Bryansk Front, and from February 1943 served as chief of staff, then as deputy commander of the 69th Army of the Voronezh Front. In this position he participated in fighting in the area of Kharkov and Poltava.

Rogozny commanded the 48th Rifle Corps from June 1943. Lieutenant General Ivan Managarov, his superior as 53rd Army commander, evaluated Rogozny as having proved himself an "energetic, brave, determined, and tatically competent general" during the defensive phase of the Battle of Kursk and the capture of Belgorod. In the fighting to take Kharkov, Managarov evaluated Rogozny as having "skillfully led his subordinate units and coped well with his assigned combat missions." Rogozny went on to lead the corps in the Second Jassy–Kishinev offensive, during which it captured Valky, Znamenka, and Iași. The corps was transferred to the 52nd Army of the 2nd Ukrainian Front in late August. The army transferred to the 1st Ukrainian Front in October.

Rogozny led the corps in the breakthrough of German defenses on the Sandomierz bridgehead on the Vistula during January 1945 and in the battles for bridgeheads on the Oder in February. The corps broke through heavily fortified German defenses on the west bank of the Oder on the Lübben-Rodlitz line and from 8 to 25 February advanced 105 km, assault-crossing three rivers. The corps captured Kotsenau, Naukhmmer, and Pribus. Colonel General Konstantin Koroteyev, the 52nd Army commander, recommended Rogozny for the Order of Suvorov, 2nd class, writing that he had "demonstrated the ability to command corps, personal initiative, and courage, often leading from the front and correctly organizing the execution of assigned objectives." By 20 April, the 294th Rifle Division of the corps captured Weißenberg, but was cut off from the army by German counterattacks. Rogozny ordered the division to prepare to break out, which was launched on 24 April. However, for "failing to report the decision to the army command, resulting in poor organization of the breakout and significant losses in personnel and equipment," and an "unorganized and premature withdrawal without taking into account conditions for the operation," Rogozny was relieved of command of the corps and placed at the disposal of the front military council without an assignment.

== Postwar ==
After the end of the war, Rogozny remained without an assignment at the disposal of the Main Personnel Directorate of the People's Commissariat of Defense until he was appointed chief of the Combat and Physical Training Directorate of the Southern Group of Forces in January 1946. In January 1948 he became chief of the combat training department of the Separate Mechanized Army, and in April became assistant commander of the army. From October 1948 he was at the disposal of the Commander-in-Chief of the Ground Forces, and in February 1949 became chief of the combat and physical training department of the North Caucasus Military District. From July of that year he served in the same position in the Don Military District. In February 1951 Rogozny was appointed head of the military department of the Kiev State University, but the order was rescinded and instead he became head of the military disciplines department of the military medical department of the Saratov Medical Institute in September of that year. He was transferred to the reserve due to illness in November 1954 and lived in Kiev, where he died on 12 January 1990.

== Awards and decorations ==
Rogozny was a recipient of the following awards and decorations:

- Order of Lenin
- Order of the Red Banner (5)
- Order of Suvorov, 2nd class
- Order of Bogdan Khmelnitsky, 2nd class
- Order of the Patriotic War, 1st class (2)
- Medals
