= Vypolzovo, Belgorod Oblast =

Vypolzovo Выползово
- Selo
- Location within Belgorod Oblast Location within Russia
- Coordinates: 51°12′N 37°59′E
- Country: Russia
- Region: Belgorod Oblast
- District: Starooskolsky District
- Time zone: UTC+3:00

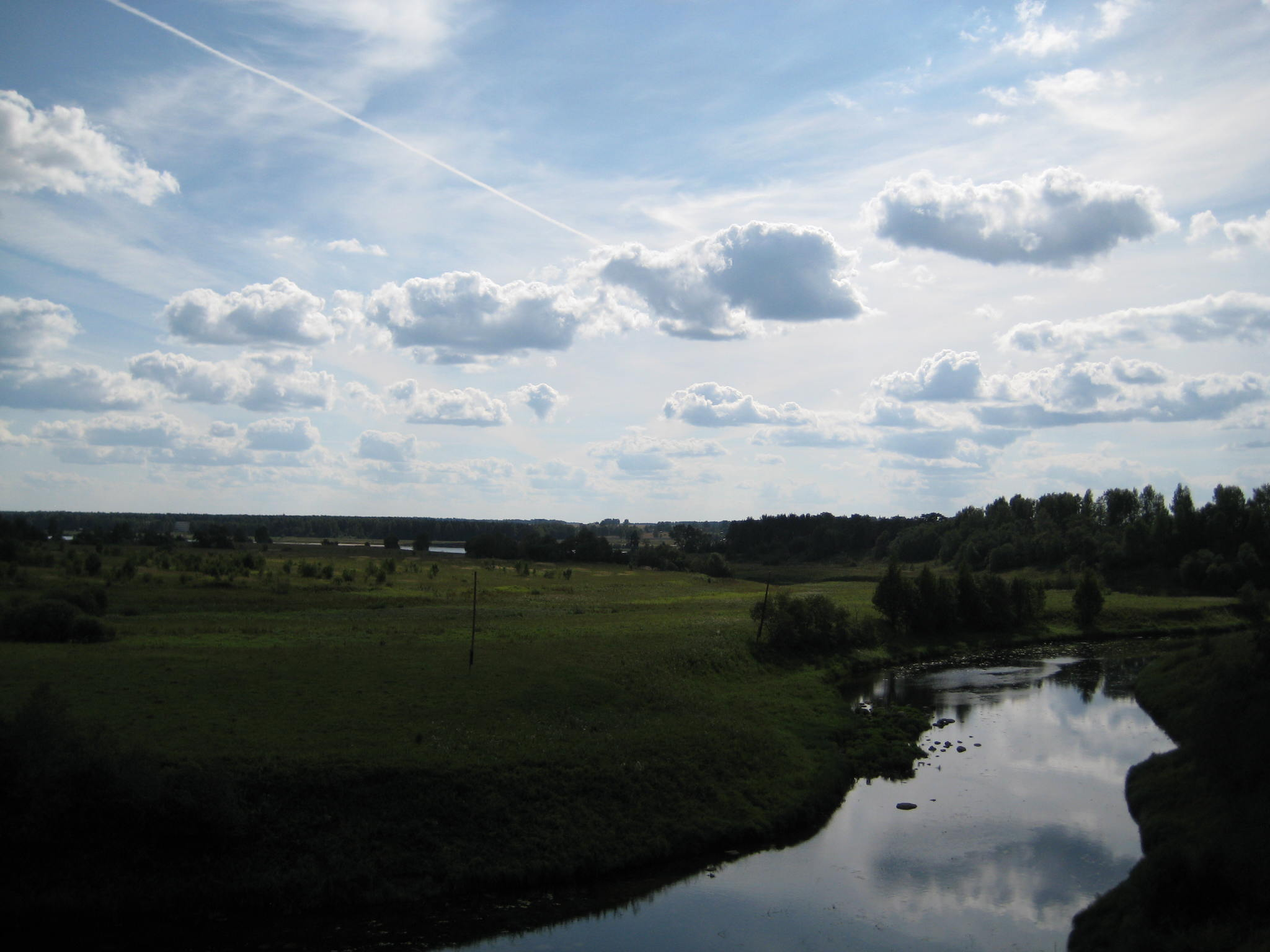
Vypolzovo

Vypolzovo (Russian: Выползово) is a rural locality (a selo) in Starooskolsky District, Belgorod Oblast, Russia. The population was 147 as of 2010. There are 12 streets.

== Geography ==
Vypolzovo is located 23 km southeast of Stary Oskol (the district's administrative centre) by road. Chernikovo is the nearest rural locality.
