= Cheremisinovo =

Cheremisinovo Черемисиново
- Urban-type settlement
- Interactive map of Cheremisinovo
- Location of Cheremisinovo Cheremisinovo (Kursk Oblast)
- Coordinates: 51.8862°N 37.2665°E
- Country: Russia
- Federal subject: Kursk Oblast
- Administrative district: Cheremisinovsky District
- Founded: 1928

Population (2010 Census)
  - Total: 3,812
  - Estimate (2025): 3,140 (−17.6%)
- Time zone: UTC+3 (MSK)
- Postal code: 306440
- OKTMO ID: 38648151051

Cheremisinovo (Russian: Черемисиново) is an urban locality (an urban-type settlement) in Cheremisinovsky District of Kursk Oblast, Russia. Population: 3,367 (2021 census); 3,812 (2010 census); 4,075 (2002 census); 4,805 (1989 Soviet census).
