= Yelets Operation =

- Part of Battle of Moscow, Great Patriotic War
Date	December 6–16, 1941
Location	Lipetsk Oblast
Result	Victory of the Soviet Union: Yelets and Efremov were freed, large enemy forces were destroyed

Belligerents
Soviet Union	Germany

Commanders and leaders
Semyon Timoshenko; Fedor Kostenko	General Cochenhausen † (134th Infantry Division); General Fritz Schlieper (45th Infantry Division)

Strength
65,000; 100 tanks 500 guns	20,000; 45 tanks 100 guns 262nd, 95th, 45th and 134th Infantry Divisions

The Yelets Offensive Operation was a front–line offensive operation of the Workers' and Peasants' Red Army during the Great Patriotic War, undertaken from 6 to December 16, 1941 by the troops of the right wing of the Southwestern Front during a counteroffensive near Moscow. The purpose of the operation was to encircle and destroy the enemy grouping in the area of the city of Yelets, and then strike into the rear of the troops of the 2nd German Tank Army. As a result of the Yelets Operation, the troops of the right wing of the Southwestern Front, advancing 80–100 km, liquidated the Yelets Ledge, surrounded and destroyed more than 2 divisions, inflicted a serious defeat on the 2nd German Army. They diverted part of the forces of the 2nd Panzer Army to themselves, thus providing substantial assistance to the troops of the left wing of the Western Front, who were performing the main task. A characteristic feature of the Yelets Operation was its preparation within a limited time frame. It was carried out at a relatively high rate in difficult winter conditions.

== Course of the operation ==
The enemy continued to press on the 13th Army and General Yakov Kreizer's 3rd Army, which was defending to the north. Further south, in the direction of Kastornoye, the 9th Panzer and 16th Motorized Divisions of the enemy failed to advance. The Military Council of the Southwestern Front decided to defeat the German Yelets grouping, which would improve the situation on the neighboring Western Front. In the rear of the 13th Army in the Terbuny Area, a mechanized cavalry group of troops was urgently created from the front reserves under the command of Lieutenant General Fyodor Kostenko: 5th Cavalry Corps (3rd, 14th and 32nd Cavalry Divisions), 1st Guards Rifle Division, 129th Tank and 34th Motorized Rifle Brigades, 4th, 7th Guards Mortars and 642nd Cannon Artillery Regiments, in addition, the 121st Rifle Division was transferred to the operational subordination of the group commander from December 6.

The counter–offensive against the 2nd Field Army of the Germans began on the northern flank of the 13th Army with the actions of the mobile group of forces of General Kirill Moskalenko, which pulled off part of the forces of the enemy group. From the line of the city of Efremov, the enemy was attacked by the formations of the 3rd Army of General Yakov Kreizer. The main blow was struck by the troops of Fyodor Kostenko. For the German command, the appearance of this group of forces on December 7 was a complete surprise. The 5th Cavalry Corps and the 1st Guards Rifle Division broke through to the flank and rear of the enemy grouping in the general direction of Yelets and to the west. The 34th Motorized Rifle Brigade was sent to Livny for deep coverage of the enemy. At the same time, the 13th Army was advancing to the southwest. All this threatened the complete encirclement of the German group. In the battles in the area of the city of Yelets, two enemy infantry divisions were completely defeated. The enemy lost 12 thousand killed and wounded on the battlefield. On December 12, the cavalrymen of General Kryuchenkin defeated the corps headquarters (the corps commander managed to leave the headquarters by plane). The encircled enemy forces tried to force their way westward, violently attacking the 3rd and 32nd Cavalry Divisions. On December 15, the commander of the German 134th Infantry Division, General Cochenhausen, personally led the surrounded Germans to a breakthrough. The cavalrymen held out, General Cochenhausen was killed in this attack, the remaining Germans surrendered or fled through the forests. The Chief of the German General Staff of the Ground Forces, Franz Halder, again sadly wrote on this occasion: "the command of the troops on the front sector between Tula and Kursk has gone bankrupt".

On December 18, the Bryansk Front was recreated as part of the 61st, 3rd and 13th Armies. The front was commanded by Colonel General Yakov Cherevichenko. Having regrouped his troops, he led them on the offensive, and by the beginning of January the Bryansk Front reached the Belyov–Mtsensk–Verkhovye line north–west of Livny.

== See also ==
- Great Patriotic War (1941–1945)

== Sources ==
- Egor Schekotikhin (2008). Battle of Oryol – Two Years: Facts, Statistics, Analysis. In 2 Books. Vol. Book One (2nd, Revised and Supplemented ed.). Eagle: Alexander Vorobyov. ISBN 978-5-91468-006-7.
