= Barvenkovo–Lozovaya offensive =

1942 Red Army operation

Coordinates: 48°54′N 37°01′E

- Part of the Eastern Front of World War II
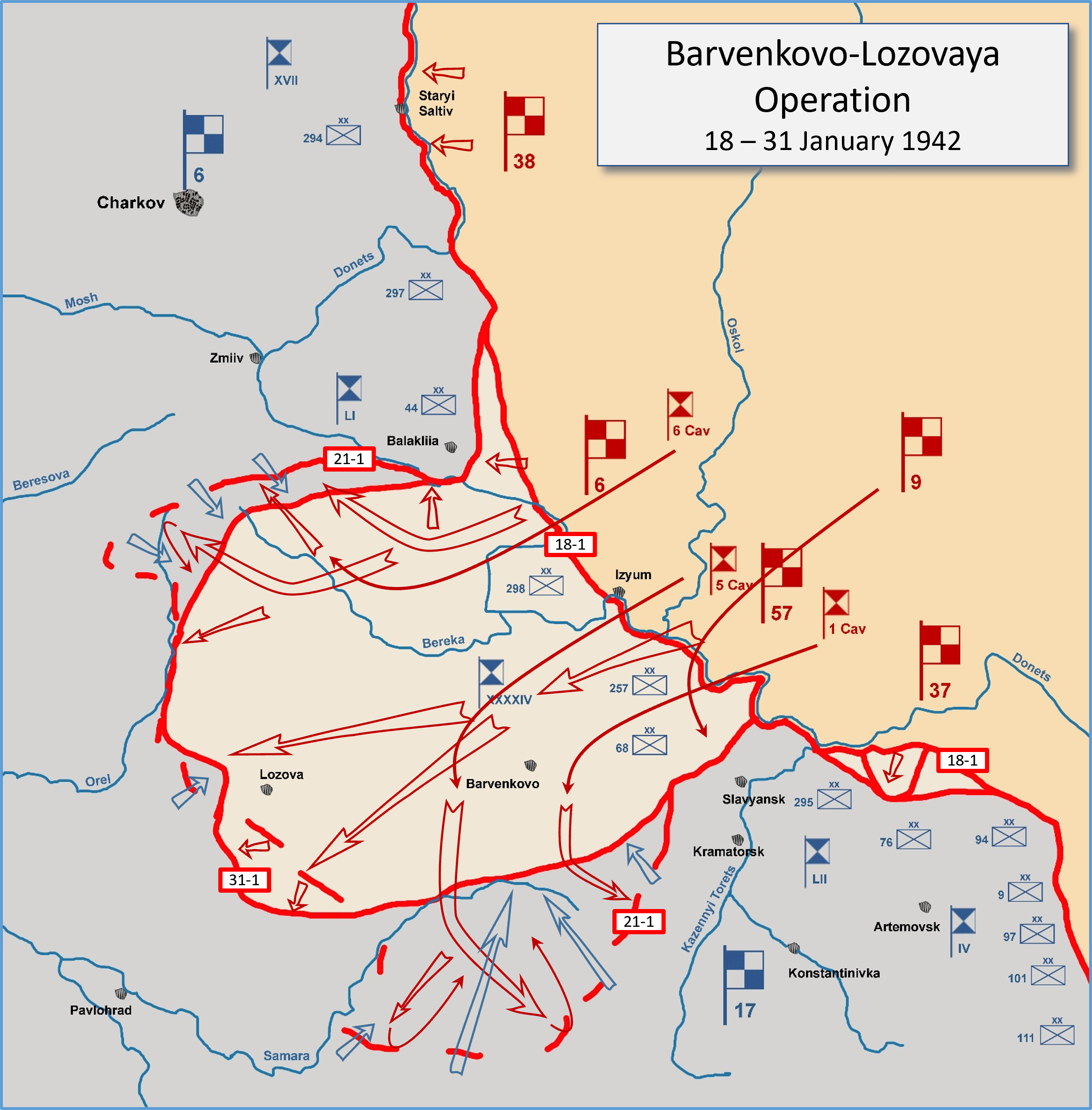
- Gains in the south during the Barvenkovo–Lozovaya offensive
Date	18–31 January 1942
Location	North-Eastern Ukraine, near Barvinkove
Result	Soviet victory

Belligerents
Germany	Soviet Union

Commanders and leaders
(Nazi Germany) Fedor von Bock	(Soviet Union) Rodion Malinovsky (Soviet Union) Fyodor Kostenko

Units involved
(Nazi Germany) Army Group South	(Soviet Union) Southwestern Front; (Soviet Union) Southern Front

Casualties and losses
25,000 (Russian estimate)	Unknown

The Barvenkovo–Lozovaya offensive was a Red Army operation on the Eastern Front in the European Theatre of World War II; it took place between 18 and 31 January 1942. The Red Army advanced 90–100 kilometres (56–62 mi) and destroyed 3 German divisions (298th, 68 and 257th Infantry Divisions). According to Soviet data, Nazi Germany lost 25,000 soldiers. According to German sources, some 5,000 soldiers were lost.

== Prelude ==
Preparations for the Barvenkovo–Lozovaya operation began from the first days of 1942. The operation was to be carried out by the forces of the South-Western and Southern Fronts. In the area of Balakliia, Lozova and Barvenkovo, the enemy's defense was not solid, but was organized in the form of a number of strongholds prepared for the conduct of circular defense. The plan of the operation was to have both Fronts jointly break through the defenses between Balakliia and Artyomovsk, to advance in the rear of the enemy forces in the Donbass-Taganrog area, to push it towards the coast of the Sea of Azov and destroy it there.

== Order of battle ==
=== USSR ===
- Southwestern Front (commander – Fyodor Kostenko).
  - 6th Army (Auxentios Gorodnyansky);
  - 38th Army (Alesksey G. Maslov);
  - 6th Cavalry Corps (A. F. Byczkowski).
- Southern Front (commander – Rodion Malinovsky).
  - 57th Army (Dmitry Ryabyshev);
  - 37th Army (Anton Lopatin);
  - 12th Army (Konstantin Koroteyev);
  - 9th Army (Fyodor Kharitonov);
  - 1st Cavalry Corps (Feofan Parkhomenko);
  - 5th Cavalry Corps (Andrei Grechko).

=== Germany ===
- Army Group South (General Field Marshal Walter von Reichenau, from January 18, 1942 – Fedor von Bock).
  - 6th Army (Friedrich Paulus);
  - 17th Army (Hermann Hoth);
  - 1st Panzer Army (Ewald von Kleist).

== Results ==
The Soviet command failed to perform the task to encircle and destroy a large group of the Wehrmacht. The command of the Soviet troops, acting at the initial stage decisively, did not take the necessary measures to expand the breakthrough on the flanks. This allowed the Germans to move in reinforcements and suffer relatively small losses to stabilize the situation.

Soviet historiography actively postulated the thesis that thanks to the Barvenkovo–Lozovaya operation, the German command could not transfer reinforcements from the southern section of the Soviet-German front to Moscow, where Soviet troops successfully counterattacked. However, the operation itself, which began in the second half of January 1942, started too late to affect the overall outcome of the Battle of Moscow.

The Soviet advance created the Izyum–Barvenkovo salient, which would be cut off by the Germans during the Second Battle of Kharkov in May 1942, causing the loss of some 300,000 Soviet soldiers.
