= Fyodor Kostenko =

Soviet general (1896–1942)

Fyodor Yakovlevich Kostenko
- Born: 22 February 1896; Bolshaya Martynovka, Russian Empire
- Died: 26 May 1942 (aged 46) Soviet Union
- Allegiance: Russian Empire; Soviet Union
- Service years: 1915–1917 (Russian Empire); 1918–1942 (Soviet Union)
- Rank: Lieutenant general
- Commands: 2nd Cavalry Corps; 26th Army; Southwestern Front
- Conflicts: World War I Russian Civil War; World War II

Fyodor Yakovlevich Kostenko (Russian: Фёдор Яковлевич Костенко; 22 February 1896 – 26 May 1942) was a Soviet corps and army commander.

== Biography ==
He was born in Bolshaya Martynovka, Martynovsky District, Rostov Oblast to an ethnic Ukrainian family. He fought in the Imperial Russian Army during World War I before going over to the Bolsheviks during the subsequent civil war.

In World War II, he commanded the 26th Army (June – September 1941) and the Southwestern Front (December 1941–April 1942). He led an operational group during the Yelets Operation from 6 December to 16 December 1941, which ended with the defeat of several enemy divisions.

Kostenko went missing on 26 May 1942, and was presumed killed, being surrounded during the tragic Second Battle of Kharkov.

He was a recipient of the Order of Lenin, the Order of the Red Banner and the Order of the Red Star.

== Discovery and reburial ==
Kostenko's body was rediscovered in spring 2016 in Kharkiv Oblast, between the villages of Husarivka and Lozovenka. Two sets of human remains were found, identified as officers from their boots. The fabric remains of stripes and the name "Kostenko" on a document helped to identify the remains of the older individual as being Kostenko's. This was later confirmed with DNA testing with his granddaughter. The second set of remains, of a younger and shorter individual, were speculated to be those of Kostenko's adjutant, Captain Vasily Ivanovich Petrovich, who had disappeared with Kostenko. Kostenko's remains were repatriated to Russia, and were interred at the Federal Military Memorial Cemetery on 20 June 2018.

== See also ==
- List of solved missing person cases

== Books ==
- Великая Отечественная война. 1941–1945. События. Люди. Документы: Краткий исторический справочник/ Под общ. ред. О. А. Ржешевского. Сост. Е. К. Жигунов — М.: Политиздат, 1990. — С. 337.
- Колесников Г. М., Лебединский Г. Н., Марков Н. В. и др. Липецк. Справочник-путеводитель. — Воронеж: Центр.-Чернозем. кн. изд-во, 1967.
- Vozhakin, Mikhail Georgievich, ed. (2005). Великая Отечественная. Командармы. Военный биографический словарь [The Great Patriotic War: Army Commanders: Military Biographical Dictionary] (in Russian). Moscow: Kuchkovo Pole. pp. 108–109. ISBN 5860901135.

Preceded by Mikhail Khatskilevich	Commander of the 2nd Cavalry Corps; April 1939 – 26 July 1940	Succeeded by Pavel Alexeyevich Belov
