= Amerikanka =

Prison in Minsk, Belarus

Pre-Trial Detention Centre of the KGB of Belarus
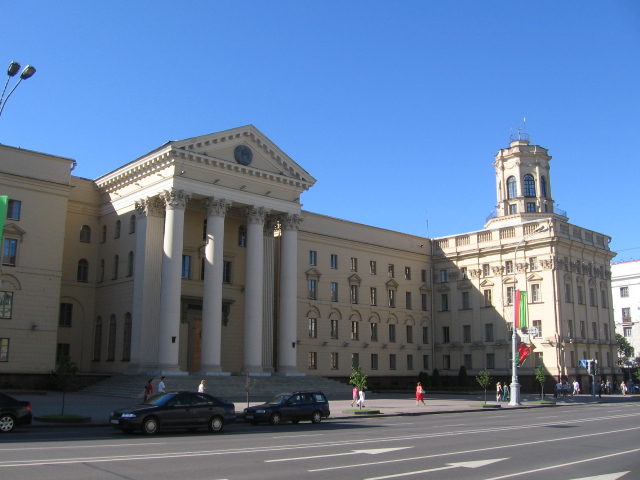
- Interactive map of Pre-Trial Detention Centre of the KGB of Belarus
- Location: Minsk, Belarus; 53°53′56″N 27°33′12″E
- Security class: Pre-Trial Detention Centre (SIZO)
- Opened: 1920s
- Former name: Internal prison of the NKVD
- Managed by: KGB (Belarus)

The Pre-Trial Detention Centre of the KGB of Belarus (Belarusian: Следчы ізалятар КДБ Беларусі, romanized: Sledčy izaliatar KDB Bielarusi; Russian: Следственный изолятор КГБ Республики Беларусь, romanized: Sledstvenny izolyator KGB Respubliki Belarus, СИЗО КГБ, SIZO KGB, also informally called Amerikanka (Belarusian: Амерыканка, romanized: Amierykanka, lit. 'American'; Russian: Американка) is a pre-trial prison in the centre of Minsk, operated by the KGB of Belarus.

The prison is used for detaining persons against whom investigation is being carried out by the KGB of Belarus, in particular, in cases where state interests are involved.

== History ==
The prison firstly operated as the internal prison of the Soviet secret police, the Cheka. It was constructed in the 1920s as part of a complex of buildings used by the Cheka. The informal name Amerikanka is believed to be referring to the prison's form as a Panopticon, based on the design of prisons in the United States.

The building was later used by the Cheka's successor organizations, the NKVD and the KGB.

In 1946, after end of World War II and the restoration of Soviet control over Belarus, the building was reconstructed.

== Sanctions against Amerikanka prison staff ==
Following the crackdown of the protests of the democratic opposition after the allegedly falsified presidential election in 2010, several KGB officers were put on the sanctions list of the European Union. The sanctions were lifted in 2016 following an improvement of the Belarus–European Union relations.

- Colonel Alexandr Vladimirovich Orlov, head of the Amerikanka: according to the EU, he was personally responsible for "cruel, inhuman and degrading treatment or punishment of detainees" in the weeks and months after the crackdown on the protests in Minsk on 19 December 2010, on the eve of the 2010 presidential election. He has been on the EU sanctions list between 2011 and 2016
- Colonel Oleg Anatolyevich Chernyshev; he allegedly personally participated in tortures of opposition activists in the Amerikanka in Minsk after the crackdown on the post-election protest demonstration in Minsk on 19 December 2010
- Lieutenant-Colonel Dmitri Vyacheslavovich Sukhov, an operative of the military counter-intelligence of the KGB; accused of falsifying evidence and using threats in order to extort confessions from detained opposition activists in the Amerikanka in Minsk after the crackdown on the post-election protest demonstration in Minsk on 19 December 2010

== Notable prisoners ==
=== Victims of Soviet repressions ===
- Barys Rahula, pro-independence activist from West Belarus, future Vice-President of the Rada of the Belarusian Democratic Republic in exile
- Over 130 victims of 1937 mass execution of Belarusians, including
  - Yakau Branshteyn
  - Anatol Volny
  - Platon Halavach
  - Valery Marakou
- Polish citizens arrested after the Soviet invasion of Poland in 1939
- Kazimierz Świątek
- Ernst Sabila

=== Political opponents of president Alexander Lukashenko ===
==== 2010 presidential candidates ====
- Mikola Statkevich
- Andrei Sannikov
- Uladzimir Nyaklyayew
- Vital Rymasheuski
- Ales Michalevic

==== Opposition leaders and activists ====
- Paval Sieviaryniec
- Zmitser Dashkevich
- Anatol Labiedźka
- Nasta Palazhanka
- Dzianis Urad

==== Journalists ====
- Natalla Radzina
- Iryna Chalip

==== 2020 presidential candidate nominees and campaigners ====
- Viktar Babaryka and his son and campaigner Eduard Babaryka
- Syarhei Tsikhanouski

==== Artists ====
- Slavamir Adamovich – convicted of inciting illegal change of power, illegally crossing the state border, and illegally carrying a melee weapon.

=== Foreigners ===
- Vladislav Baumgertner, CEO of Uralkali

== See also ==
- Pishchalauski Castle
- Okrestina
