= Aleś Dudar =

Belarusian poet

- Алесь Дудар
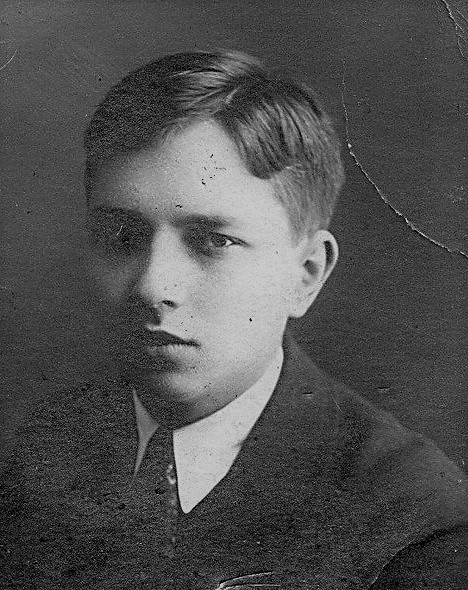
- Dudar in the 1930s
- Born: Aliaksandr Dajlidovič; 24 December 1904; Navasiolki, Mazyr county, Minsk province, Russian Empire (now Pyetrykaw District, Homiel Region, Belarus)
- Died: October 29, 1937 (aged 32); Minsk, Belarusian Soviet Socialist Republic (now Belarus)
- Resting place: unknown
- Occupations: poet, critic, translator
- Writing career
- Language: Belarusian

Aleś Dudar (Belarusian: Алесь Дудар) was the pen name of Aliaksandr Dajlidovič (Belarusian: Аляксандр Дайлідовіч; 24 December 1904 – 29 October 1937), a Belarusian poet, critic, translator and a victim of Stalin's purges.

== Early life ==
Dudar was born into the family of a farm labourer in the village of Navasiolki, Mazyr county, Minsk province, Russian Empire (now Pyetrykaw District in Homiel region of Belarus). During World War I, the family took refuge in the Tambov region of Russia but returned to Belarus in the spring of 1917.

After finishing school in 1921, Dudar joined a theatre troupe and published his first poem. He was also engaged in literary criticism and translations from Russian, German and French and in 1923 became a member of “Maladniak” (the “Young Growth”), an association of young Belarusian poets.

In 1927-28 Dudar studied Literature and Linguistics at the Belarusian State University.

== Persecution by the Soviet authorities ==
In 1928 Dudar was forced to leave the university and the following year was arrested and deported to Smolensk for three years for his poem "They cut our land" (“Пасеклі наш край”) in which he criticised the partition of the Belarusian lands between the Soviet Union and the Second Polish Republic.

He was rearrested in 1930 and interrogated in connection with the Case of the Union for the Liberation of Belarus. Upon the expiration of his exile, he returned to Minsk.

In 1935-36 Dudar was mainly engaged in translations but was arrested for the third time in October 1936. He endured a year of interrogation but did not want to cooperate with the Soviet secret police. On June 3, 1937, the Main Department of Literature and Publishing of the Belarusian SSR (Holovlit BSSR) issued Order No. 33 "List of literature subject to confiscation from public libraries, educational institutions, and bookstores" which decreed that all his books had to be burned.

== Death and memory ==
Dudar was sentenced to death and executed in Minsk's NKVD prison on 29 October 1937. The place of his burial is unknown.

He was posthumously exonerated during the Krushchev Thaw in 1957.

There is no official place of Dudar commemoration in present-day Belarus, however he is unofficially commemorated on the annual “Remembrance Day” among 132 other poets, writers and cultural figures who were executed by the Soviet authorities on the night of 29–30 October 1937.

His works are not included in the school programme but some teachers organise events dedicated to his memory.

== Creative and critical works ==
He made his debut with a poem in 1921 in the newspaper "Soviet Belarus". He published several collections of poetry: "Rebellious Belarus" (1925), "Sunny Paths" (1925), "And Gold and Steel" (1926), "Tower" (1928), as well as a collection of short stories "The Marseillaise" (1927). Selected works were published in 1959, and the collection of his poems "The Tower" was published in 1984. Together with Andrey Aleksandrovich and Anatol Volny, he wrote the novel "Wolves" (1925). Under the pseudonym T. Hlybocki, he published a collection of articles of literary criticism "On Literary Matters" (1928).

Dudar translated from Russian, German, French. He translated the novel "Eugene Onegin" and some works of Alexander Pushkin, "Twelve" by Alexander Blok, excerpts from "Faust" by Johann Goethe, works of Sergei Yesenin, Boris Pasternak, Nikolai Tikhonov, Heinrich Heine, Erich Weinert, selected poems by Stanislav Stande (1932), Fyodor Gladkov's story "New Earth" (1932), Uladzimir Kuzmich's novel "Helicopter Wings" (1932), "The Tale of Shackles" by Mykolai Liashko (1933), works by Friedrich Schiller (1934), and "The Marriage of Figaro" by Pierre Beaumarchais (1936).

He used several pseudonyms and cryptonyms: T. Hlybocki; Todar Hlybocki; Al. D.; T. G.; T.G.; and Artem Yarocki.

== Main poems ==
- Асыпае чэрвень белы сад (June showers the white garden)
- Беларусь (Belarus)
- Вежа (the Tower)
- За маім акном - абрывы... (Cliffs behind my window...)
- Запляці залатую касу (Do a gold braid)
- Камяніца (Stone House)
- Кастусь Каліноўскі (Kastuś Kalinoŭski)
- Мятнуўся небасхіл перуном сінякрылым... (The sky darted as blue-winged lightning...)
- Не сягоння было і не ўчора... (It wasn't today and it wasn't yesterday ...)
- Пасеклі Край наш (They cut our land)
- Скарына (Skaryna)
- Ў музеі залатую бранзалетку... (A gold bracelet in the museum ...)
- Ўсё аддам залатому жыццю я (I will give everything to the golden life)
- Цаліну алавяных хмар... (The virgin land of tin clouds ...)
- Я малады (I'm young).

=== The Tower ===
The tower sleeps? What is it dreaming?

It rises, gloomy, like a ghost.

A prison here? A belfry seeming?

Who is there that can guess its past?

And grizzled time roams round about it,

Like hours' tramp, like a minute sped...

And the long centuries uncounted

Have made of the grey stones a bed.

The years built, without work nor effort,

A nest of legends, tales of yore...

And now, today, these men in heavy

Boots tramp the drawbridge-plank once more.

They've swathed the tower with forms mysterious;

None will untie the ends once more,

Not mighty Scandinavian heroes,

Nor merchants from the Golden Horn.

And to the tower wires now can anchor

Distance so fast the mind must reel...

Foresires, could you but understand the

Truth of antennae of chilled steel.

You cannot comprehend, forefathers,

Your tower now has a task renowned,

For from infinity it gathers

Voices into its shining crown.

1927, translated by Vera Rich
