= Marakou =

Marakou is a Belarusian surname derived from the word marak, "sailor". Notable people with the surname include:

- Leanid Marakou
- Valery Marakou
