= 1937 mass execution of Belarusians =

Soviet mass execution in Belarus

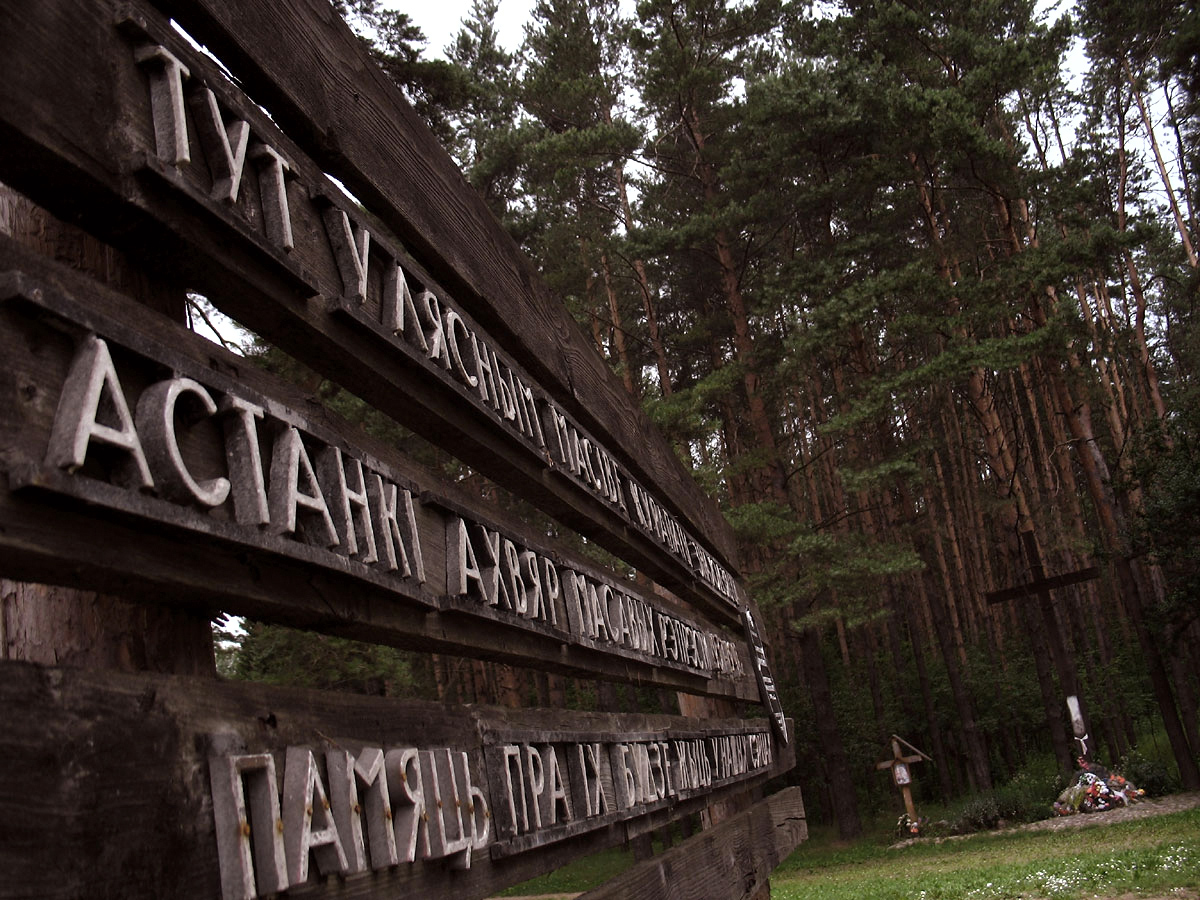
Kurapaty near Minsk is the place where mass executions of Belarusian civilians were carried out during the Stalinist regime (1937 - 1941)

In October 1937, there was a mass extermination of Belarusian writers, artists and statespeople by the Soviet Union occupying authorities. This event marked the peak of the Great Purge and repressions of Belarusians in the Soviet-controlled area of eastern Belarus.

More than 100 notable persons were executed, most of them starting on 29 October 1937 and continuing into the next morning. Their innocence was later admitted by the Soviet Union after Joseph Stalin's death.

It is known in Belarus as the Night of the Murdered Poets, or the Night of the Executed Poets (Ноч расстраляных паэтаў).

== History ==
On 7 September 1937 Joseph Stalin signed a list of persons to be judged by a Soviet Military commission. The list was also signed by Vyacheslav Molotov, Lazar Kaganovich, Klim Voroshilov and Nikolay Yezhov. There were trials related to persons from the Belarusian SSR and these were given in a different list dated 15 September 1937 and signed by Stalin, Molotov and the senior state security official Vladimir Tsesarsky. The list of people from the Belarusian SSR sentenced to be executed included 103 persons, and six more persons who were sentenced to ten or more years in concentration camps.

The initial list was extended by the NKVD of the Belarusian SSR. People added to the list by the NKVD of Belarus are marked with an asterisk (*) in the list below. The executions took place in the Minsk internal NKVD prison (known as the Amerikanka). Journalist Leanid Marakoŭ alleged that between 3 March 1937 and 22 May 1938, over 100,000 people fell victims of repressions by the Soviet authorities.

== List of executed persons ==
1. Barys Abuchoŭ
2. Mikałaj Arabej, head of primary education department of the Communist Party of Byelorussia
3. Navum Aronaŭ
4. Ihnat Afanaśjeŭ, lecturer and pedagogue
5. Anatol Aŭhusсinovič, head of construction department at the Soviet of People's Commissars (government) of Belarus
6. Siamion Babkoŭ
7. Hieorhi Barzunoŭ
8. Vadzim Baškievič, senior official at the People's Commissariate for Education
9. Sałamon Bejlin
10. Abram Biełacarkoŭski
11. Jakaŭ Branštejn, literary critic
12. Ivan Burdyka, government official
13. Viktar Vajnoŭ, journalist
14. Alaksandar Varončanka, people's commissar (minister) for education of Belarus
15. Stanisłaŭ Varšaŭski
16. Ryhor Vasiljeŭ-Vaščylin
17. Anatol Volny, artist
18. Moŭša-Nochim Habajeŭ
19. Apanas Habrusioŭ
20. Płaton Hałavač, writer
21. Anton Hejštern
22. Josif Heršon, deputy education minister of Belarus
23. Jakaŭ Hinzburh
24. Abram Hosin
25. Kanstancin Hurski
26. Nochman Hurevič
27. Mikałaj Dzieniskievič, senior Communist Party official
28. Mikałaj Dźmitraŭ
29. Anani Dziakaŭ, president of the Belarusian State University in 1934-1935
30. Abram Drakachrust
31. Aleś Dudar, poet
32. Chackiel Duniec, critic and writer
33. Hirš Jelanson
34. Mikałaj Jermakoŭ
35. Ivan Žyvucki, teacher
36. Navum Zamalin, junior professor at Vitsebsk Veterinarian Institute
37. Michaś Zarecki, writer
38. Alaksandar Ziankovič
39. Alaksandar Ivanoŭ
40. Prochar Ispraŭnikaŭ, agriculture journalist from Vitsebsk
41. Zachar Kavaloŭ, statesman, Communist Party official
42. Vasil Kaval, writer
43. Zachar Kavalčuk, Labour Union leader
44. Mikałaj Kandrašuk, senior official at the People's Commisariate for Light Industry of Belarus
45. Sałamon Kantar
46. Michaił Kapitanaki
47. Jazep Karanieŭski, statesman, pedagogue
48. Ivan Karpienka, veterinarian
49. Hierasim Kačanaŭ
50. Viktar Klanicki
51. Todar Klaštorny, poet
52. Josif Kudzielka, head of copyright department at the Union of Writers of Belarus
53. Moyshe Kulbak, Yiddish language writer
54. Alaksiej Kučynski, statesman, pedagogue, journalist
55. Michaił Łabadajeŭ, Communist Party official
56. Leanard Łaškievič, senior agriculture official
57. Alaksandar Levin, literature critic
58. Sałamon Levin, literature critic
59. Pinia Lejbin
60. Chaim Lajbovič
61. Maksim Laŭkoŭ, justice minister of Belarus
62. Siamion Lichtenštejn
63. Mikita Łukašonak
64. Jurka Lavonny, poet
65. Sałamon Lampiert, student
66. Elizar Maziel, veterinarian, scientist
67. Leŭ Majsiejeŭ, Communist Party of Byelorussia official
68. Barys Małaŭ, senior official at the People's Commisariate of Trade
69. Valery Marakoŭ, poet
70. Sciapan Marhiełaŭ, geography scientist
71. Michaił Marholin
72. Barys Marjanaŭ, Communist Party of Byelorussia official
73. Pavał Masleńnikaŭ
74. Andrej Mielik-Šachnazaraŭ
75. Abram Mirlin
76. Mikalai Misnikou
77. Dziamyan Mikhaylau, advisor at the government of Belarus
78. Mikałaj Michiejeŭ
79. Siarhiej Mićkoŭ, factory director, ministry official
80. Siarhiej Murzo, poet
81. Pavał Muchin, veterinarian
82. Jakaŭ Navachrest
83. Ivan Nieściarovič
84. Ivan Padsiavałaŭ
85. Ivan Papłyka
86. Michaił Pasmarnik
87. Vasil Pietrušenia, transport and utilities adviser at the government of Belarus
88. Ziama Pivavaraŭ, poet
89. Michaił Pitomcaŭ
90. Apałon Pratapopaŭ
91. Ryhor Pratasienia, agriculture chemistry scientist
92. Izrail Purys
93. Alaksandar Puciłoŭski
94. Ivan Pucincaŭ
95. Kuźma Piatrašyn
96. Janka Niomanski, writer, social activist
97. Aron-Lejb Razumoŭski
98. Michaił Rydzieŭski, university professor
99. Alaksandar Samachvałaŭ
100. Jakaŭ Sandamirski, university professor
101. Oskar Saprycki, government official
102. Ivan Sarokaš
103. Jakaŭ Spiektar, government official
104. Vasil Starynski
105. Vasil Stašeŭski, writer
106. Hieorhi Strele, sovkhoz director
107. Mikałaj Suroŭcaŭ
108. Dźmitry Siałoŭ, official at the education ministry
109. Pancialej Siardziuk, biologist
110. Miron Tanienbaum
111. Julij Taŭbin, poet
112. Ivan Trocki
113. Ela Trumpacki
114. Andrej Turłaj, People's Commissar for sovkhozy of Belarus
115. Jaŭhien Uśpienski, physicist
116. Ryhor Fałkin
117. Aba Finkielštajn
118. Jaŭsiej Fłombaŭm
119. Isak Frydman, government official
120. Dźmitry Charłac
121. Izi Charyk, poet
122. Piatro Chatuloŭ, literature critic
123. Alaksandar Čarnuševič, education minister
124. Mikałaj Čarniak
125. Michaś Čarot, poet
126. Kanstancin Čačura
127. Makar Šałaj, literature critic
128. Judal Šapira
129. Pavał Šastakoŭ, journalist
130. Aran Judelson, Yiddish language poet
131. Jakaŭ Julkin
132. Viktar Jarkin, official at the Dniapro-Dzvina river steamboats navigation in Homel

== Sources ==
- Маракоў Л. Ахвяры і карнікі. Мн.: Зміцер Колас, 2007 г. ISBN 978-985-6783-38-1
- Грахоўскі С. «Так погибали поэты»/Выбраныя творы. Мн.: Кнігазбор, 2007 г. ISBN 985-6824-59-1

== See also ==
- Soviet repressions in Belarus
- Case of the Union of Liberation of Belarus
- Executed Renaissance
