= Nowosiółki =

Nowosiółki may refer to the following places:

- Nowosiółki, Gmina Sławatycze in Lublin Voivodeship (east Poland)
- Nowosiółki, Gmina Zalesie in Lublin Voivodeship (east Poland)
- Nowosiółki, Chełm County in Lublin Voivodeship (east Poland)
- Nowosiółki, Hrubieszów County in Lublin Voivodeship (east Poland)
- Nowosiółki, Gmina Dobrzyniewo Duże in Podlaskie Voivodeship (north-east Poland)
- Nowosiółki, Gmina Gródek in Podlaskie Voivodeship (north-east Poland)
- Nowosiółki, Siemiatycze County in Podlaskie Voivodeship (east Poland)
- Nowosiółki, Gmina Telatyn, Tomaszów County in Lublin Voivodeship (east Poland)
- Nowosiółki, Subcarpathian Voivodeship (south-east Poland)
- Nowosiółki, Masovian Voivodeship (east-central Poland)
- Nowosiółki, Pomeranian Voivodeship (north Poland)
- Nowosiółki, West Pomeranian Voivodeship (north-west Poland)
- Nowosiółki, Polish name for Navasiolki (west Belarus)
