= Virtual Museum of Soviet Repression in Belarus =

Virtual museum covering human rights in Belarus

The Virtual Museum of Soviet Repression in Belarus (Belarusian: Віртуальны музей савецкіх рэпрэсій у Беларусі, romanized: Virtualny muzej saveckich represij u Biełarusi) is a non-commercial project of oral history from historians and other scientists from Belarus. Created as a virtual museum, it covers Soviet repression in Belarus.

== Background ==
In 2007, the Belarusian Christian Democracy party launched a campaign called "Repentance". The campaign began meeting with former prisoners of camps, record their memories, and collect materials on the subject of repression.

In 2012, an independent civic initiative was formed, which began to create a Virtual museum of Soviet repression in Belarus. The basis for the museum was materials collected during the campaign "Repentance".

In 2014, a website for the virtual museum was created. The museum is only available online; there is currently as of 2020 no physical exhibition of the material.

== Concept of the museum ==
The museum operates with an approach of oral history by presenting recordings of inhabitants of Belarus who report on their personal experiences with Repression during the Soviet time. The museum covers a part of Belarusian history that is mainly excluded from current Belarusian official historiography.

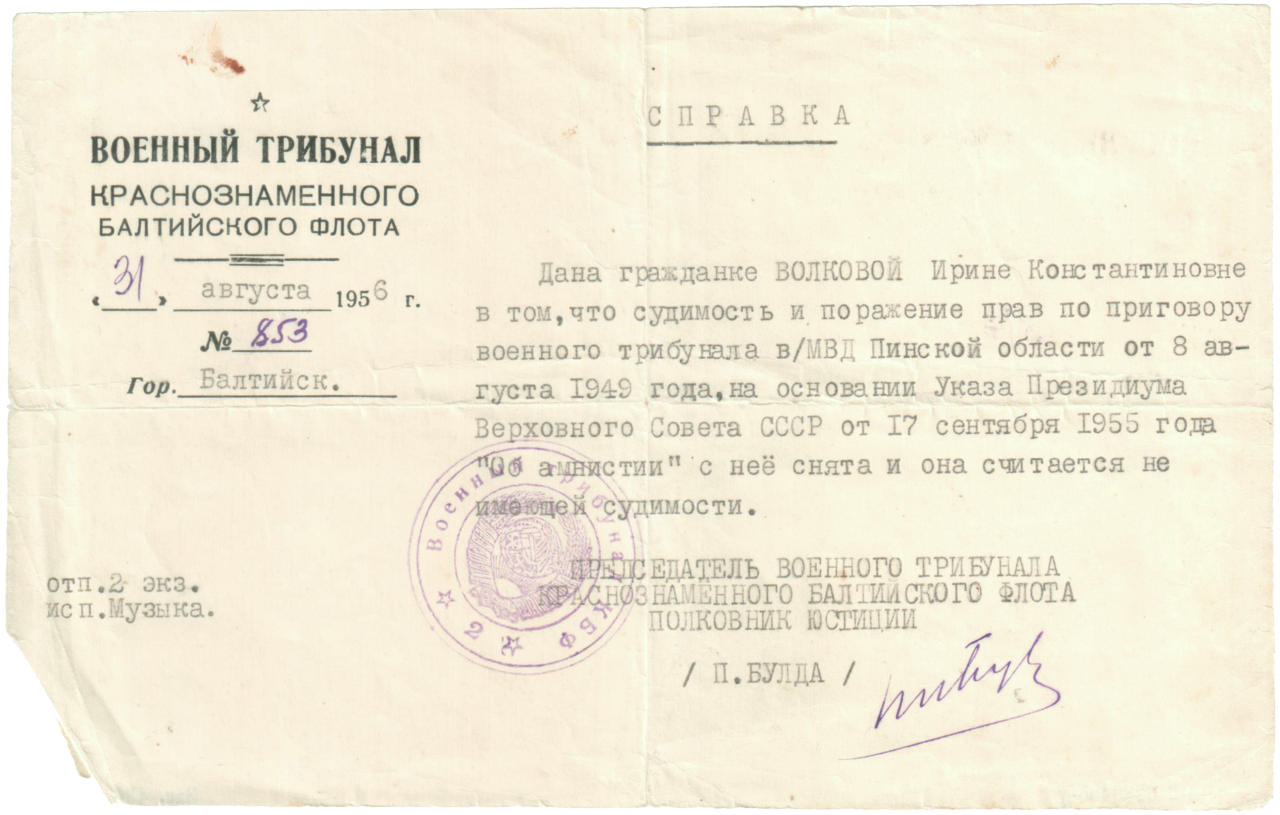
Example of a military court ruling during Soviet times from 1956 from the virtual museum.

The content of the exhibition consists of recordings of audio- and video-recollections, photographs, documents, and statistics connected with repression in Belarus. Also, a chronicle of the repression in Belarus and some historical articles are included.

As of 2020, the museum includes seven showrooms:

- Soviet myths
- Chronology of repression
- Victims of repression
- The system of repression
- Anti-Soviet resistance
- Rehabilitation
- Commemorative culture

Among the museum's special features are, besides the narrative interviews, inter alia interactive maps of the NKVD in Belarus, and memorials on repression. In addition, the museum offers a victim-search option with more than 30,000 records.

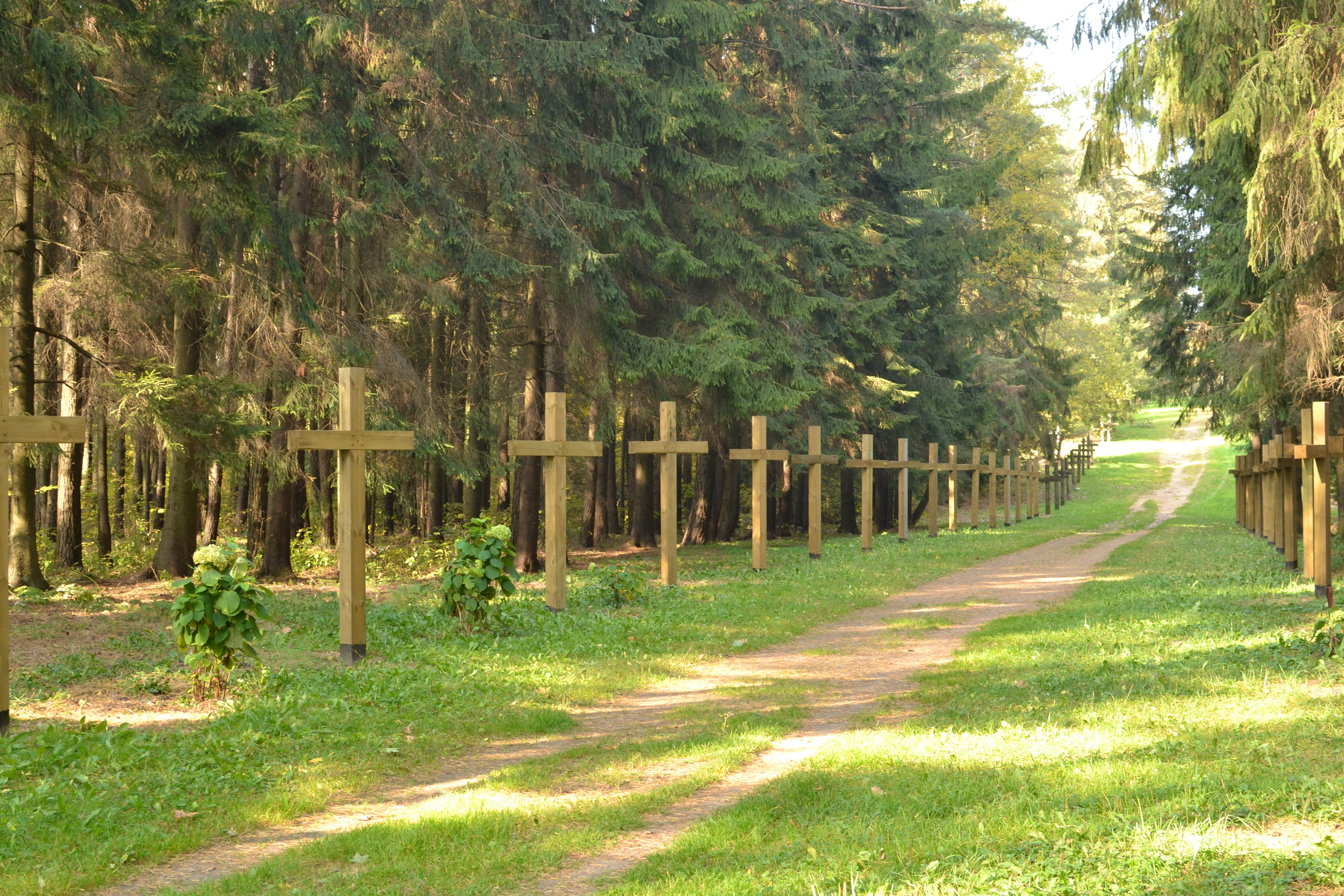
Kurapaty site near Minsk in Belarus.

== Partners ==
Among the partners of this project are Konrad Adenauer Foundation and the Belarusian Oral History Archive project.

== See also ==
- Soviet repressions in Belarus
- Kurapaty
- Gulag
- Virtual museum
- Museum of Occupations and Freedom Fights
- Museum of Soviet Occupation, Kyiv
