= Todar Klaštorny =

Belarusian poet

- Тодар Кляшторны
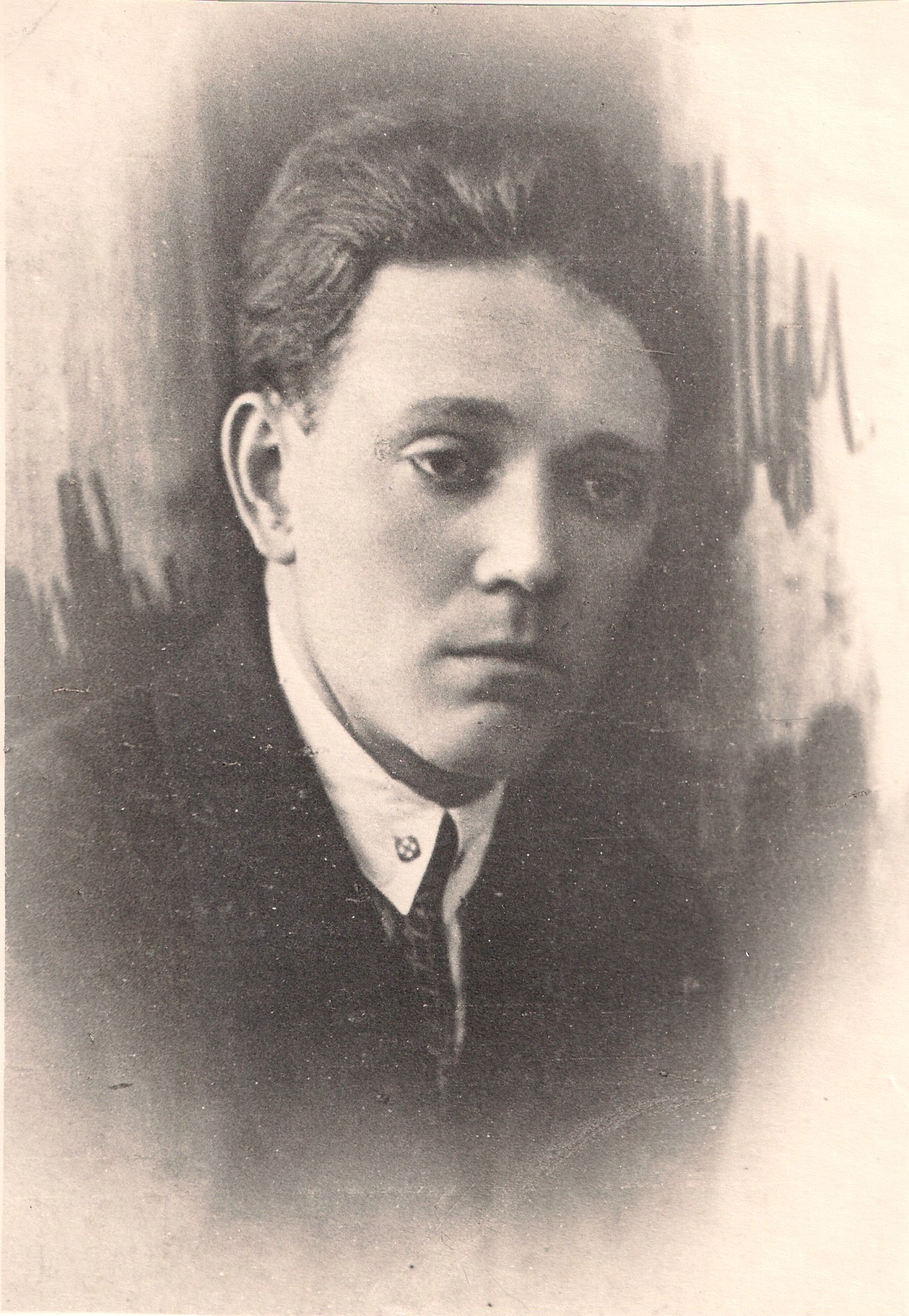
- Born: March 11, 1903; Parečča (now in Belarus)
- Died: October 30, 1937 (aged 34); Minsk
- Cause of death: Executed
- Education: Belarusian State University
- Known for: Belarusian romantic poet and translator

Todar Klaštorny (Belarusian: То́дар То́даравіч Кляшто́рны, Russian: То́дор То́дорович Кляшто́рный; 11 March 1903 - 30 October 1937) was a Belarusian romantic poet, translator and a victim of Stalin’s purges.

== Early years ==
Klaštorny was born in the village of Parečča (now in Lyepyel district of Vitebsk region) into a farming family. He studied at a school for adult workers in Vorša and, later, at the Belarusian State University (the literary and linguistic department of the pedagogical faculty).

After graduation in 1931, Klaštorny worked on the radio, in several Soviet Belarusian newspapers and magazines and was a member of the associations Maładniak, Uzvyšša and the Belarusian Association of Proletarian Writers and Poets.

== Works ==
The first poems by Klaštorny were published in 1925 in the magazine Varšanski Maładniak. In 1927 a collection of poetry Maple Blizzards was published. Due to the similarity of style and mood of his works, he was called "Belarusian Yesenin".

Apart from numerous poems in subsequent years, Klaštorny authored short stories and essays and translated into Belarusian works of K. Vanek, F. Panfiorov, V. Gusev, P. Tychyna, V. Mayakovsky and others.

In several poems, Klaštorny criticised the Stalinist system. Thus, in When the mud settles, he was the first of the poets to write openly that "We walk under the high moon, and also under the GPU". In one of his last books (the fairy tale About the Hare, the Wolf and the Bear, 1934), he depicted a Belarusian intellectual in the image of a hare living in an atmosphere of total violence and fear between a wolf and a bear (a metaphor for the Stalinist penal system).

Klaštorny’s style of writing was described as “melancholic, but at the same time strangely combined with irony”.

He published his last poem The Song about Spring on 27 March 1936.

== Death and memory ==
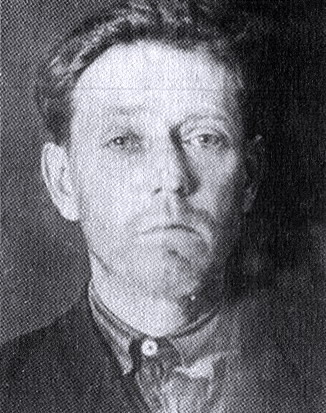
Todar Klaštorny in jail

In the autumn of the same year, Klaštorny was arrested and in 1937 sentenced to death. The sentence was carried out on the Night of Executed Poets.

His wife and three daughters (one of which was newly born) were sent to the GULAG for 8 years.

Klaštorny was posthumously exonerated during the Khrushchev’s Thaw in 1957.

Works of Klaštorny have been translated into Russian, Ukrainian and Lithuanian. The composers Mikoła Raviensky and I. Ivanov have written music for some of his poems. In 2003, a library-museum dedicated to Klaštorny was opened in the village of Kamien in Lepiel district and in 2008 a street in the village was named after the poet.

One of Klaštorny's daughters, a gulag survivor Maia Klaštornaja, was a research manager of the Kurapaty memorial in Minsk.
