= Pukhavichy, Minsk region =

Village in Minsk Region, Belarus

Pukhavichy Пухавічы (Belarusian) Пуховичи (Russian) Pukhovichi
- Agrotown
- Location within Belarus
- Coordinates: 53°31′49″N 28°15′13″E
- Country: Belarus
- Region: Minsk Region
- District: Pukhavichy District
- Time zone: UTC+3 (MSK)

Pukhavichy (Belarusian: Пухавічы; Russian: Пуховичи, romanized: Pukhovichi; Polish: Puchowicze) is an agrotown in Pukhavichy District, Minsk Region, Belarus. It serves as the administrative center of Pukhavichy selsoviet.

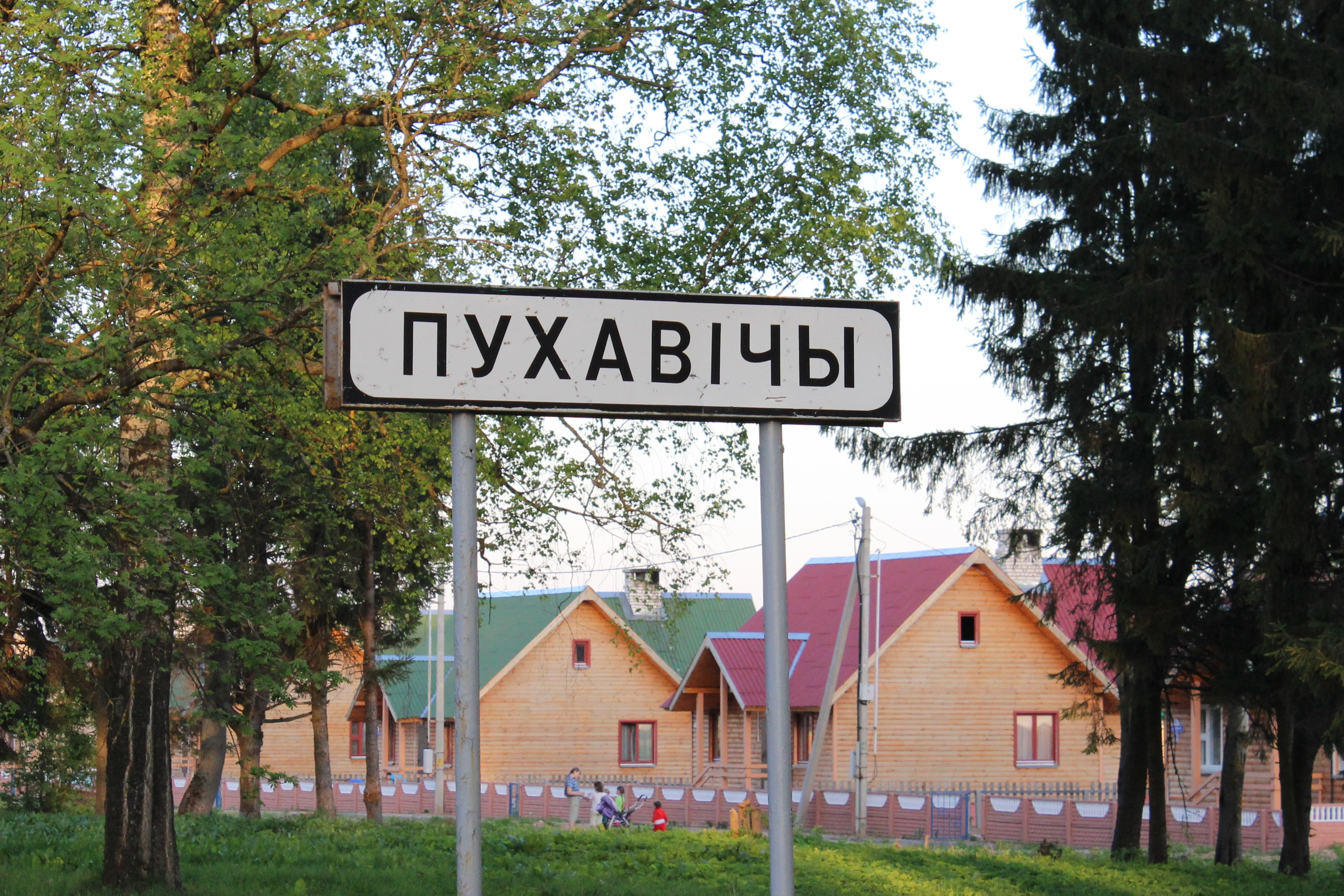
Landscape of Pukhavichy

== History ==
In December 1926, 929 Jews lived in the village, 43 percent of the total population. The Germans occupied the town at the end of June 1941. The Jewish population were murdered in 1941.

== Notable people ==
- Anatol Volny (1902–1937), Belarusian artist, poet, writer and journalist
