= Soviet repressions in Belarus =

Persecution of people in Belarus under Communist rule

Emblem of the Byelorussian SSR

Soviet repression in Belarus (Belarusian: Савецкія рэпрэсіі ў Беларусі, romanized: Savieckija represii w Biełarusi) refers to cases of persecution of people in Belarus under Soviet rule.

== Number of victims ==
According to researchers, the exact number of people who became victims of Soviet repression in Belarus is hard to determine because the archives of the KGB in Belarus remain inaccessible to historians.

According to incomplete estimates, approximately 600,000 people fell victim to Soviet repression in Belarus between the October Revolution in 1917 and the death of Joseph Stalin in 1953. Other estimates rise the number to more than 1.4 million people, with 250,000 sentenced by the judiciary or executed by extrajudicial bodies (dvoikas, troikas, and special commissions of the OGPU, NKVD, and MGB).

358,686 people believed to be victims of Soviet repression were sentenced to death in Belarus between 1917 and 1953, according to historian Vasil Kushner. Overall, around 200,000 victims of Soviet political repression were rehabilitated in Belarus between 1954 and 2000.

== Effects ==
=== Science ===
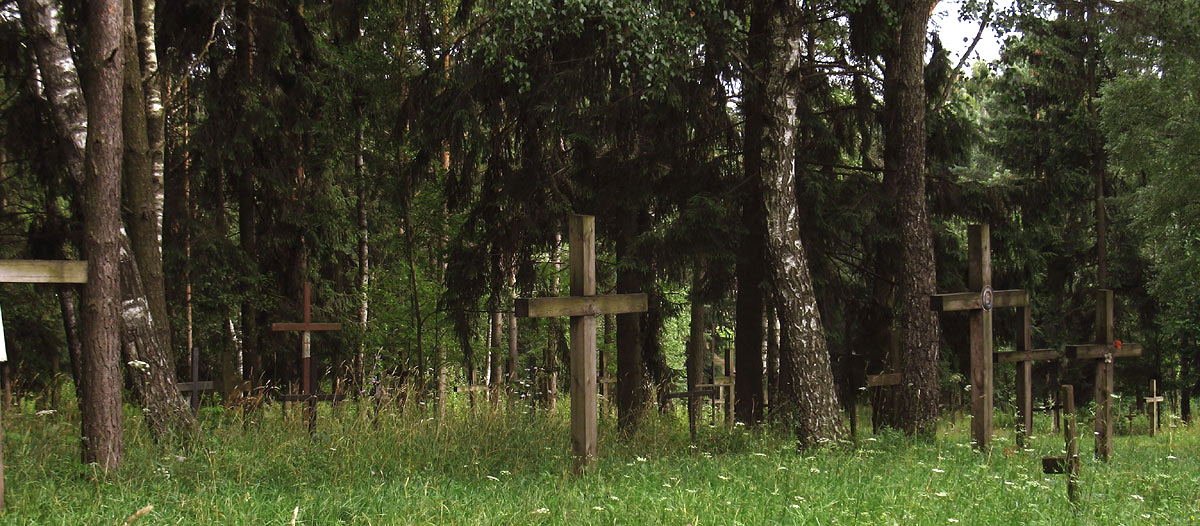
Kurapaty, a former Soviet mass extermination site near Minsk

According to Kushner, in the 1930s, only 26 Belarusian academicians and 6 correspondent members of the Belarusian Science Academy were unaffected by repressions. Of 139 PhD students (aspirants) in Belarus as of 1934, only six people escaped execution during the repressions. According to Kushner, the Soviet repressions virtually stopped any humanities research in Belarus.

According to the Belarusian-Swedish historian Andrej Kotljarchuk, in the 1930s the Soviets either physically exterminated or banned from further research 32 historians from Minsk with their works being also excluded from libraries. According to Kotljarchuk, the Soviet authorities thereby physically destroyed the Belarusian school of history studies of that time.

=== Literature ===
According to historian Leanid Marakoŭ, of approximately 540–570 writers who had been published in Belarus in the 1920s and 1930s, not less than 440–460 (80%) became victims of Soviet repression. This number includes Todar Klaštorny, Andrej Mryj and many others. Including those forced to leave Belarus, no less than 500 (90%) of published Belarusian writers fell victim to the repressions, a quarter of the total number of writers persecuted by the state at this time in the entire USSR.

At the same time, according to Marakoŭ, in Ukraine 35% to 40% of writers have been victims of repressions, in Russia, the number is below 15%.

=== Medicine ===
A total of 1520 Belarusian medical specialists have become victims of repressions, this includes about 500 doctors, over 200 nurses, almost 600 veterinarians, several hundreds of family members that have been sentenced within the same legal cases.

== Notable victims ==
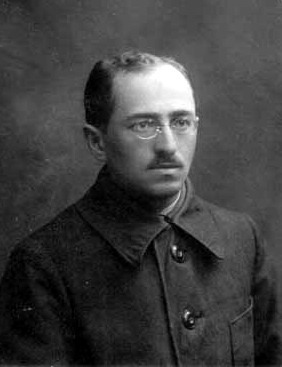
Branisłaŭ Taraškievič, executed by the Soviets in 1937

- Źmicier Žyłunovič, poet, writer and journalist, the first leader of the Soviet Socialist Republic of Belarus, arrested during the Great Purge and committed suicide in prison in 1937
- Branisłaŭ Taraškievič, linguist, translator and West Belarusian politician, executed in 1938
- Vacłaŭ Łastoŭski, literature historian, member of the Belarusian Science Academy, former prime minister of the Belarusian Democratic Republic, executed in 1938
- Fabijan Abrantovič, prominent religious and civic leader, died from torture in the Butyrka prison in 1946
- Adam Stankievič, Roman Catholic priest, Christian democratic politician in West Belarus, died in a concentration camp in 1949
- Jurka Listapad, Belarusian publicist and participant in the Belarusian independence movement and anti-Soviet resistance

== Modern commemoration ==
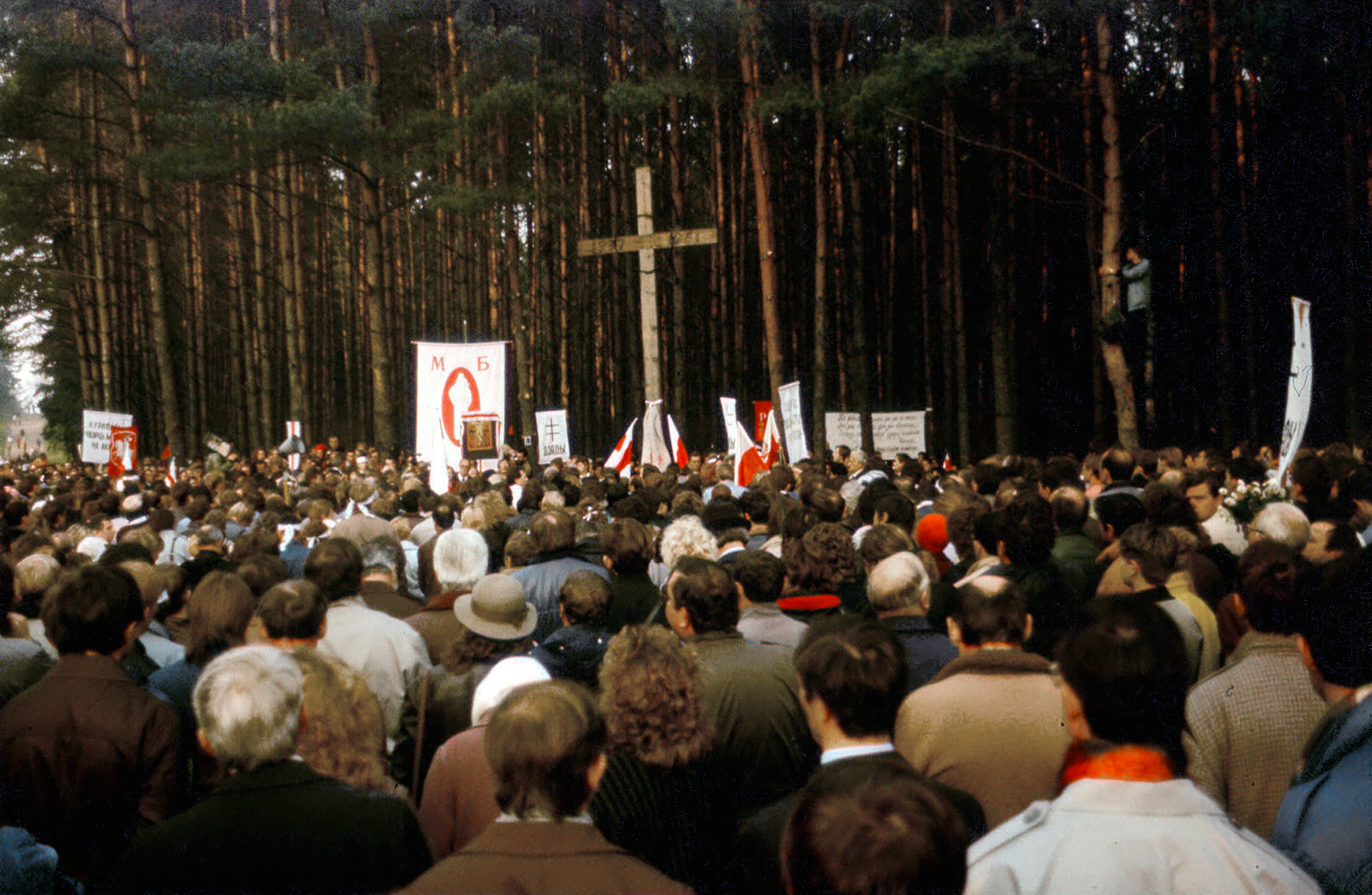
A meeting in Kurapaty in 1989

In the late 1980s the influential pro-democracy and pro-independence movement in Belarus (the Belarusian Popular Front) has been largely inspired by the Perestroika and by the findings of graves on the former Soviet execution site in Kurapaty near Minsk.

Unlike in neighbouring countries, the authorities of the Republic of Belarus under president Alexander Lukashenko give only limited access to state archives related to Stalinist repressions and do not commemorate the victims of Communism on a governmental level.

The democratic opposition close to the Conservative Christian Party, the revived Belarusian Christian Democracy and Partyja BNF commemorate the victims of the Soviet regime on 29 and 30 October, the day of a mass execution of Belarusian writers in 1937, and on the traditional ancestors commemoration day (Dziady) in early November.

In 2014 a website for the Virtual Museum of Soviet Repression in Belarus was created.

== See also ==
- 1937 mass execution of Belarusians
- Case of the Union of Liberation of Belarus
- Virtual Museum of Soviet Repression in Belarus
