= Pyetrykaw district =

District of Gomel region, Belarus

Coordinates: 52°15′N 028°30′E

Pyetrykaw district Петрыкаўскі раён (Belarusian) Петриковский район (Russian)
- District
- Flag Coat of arms

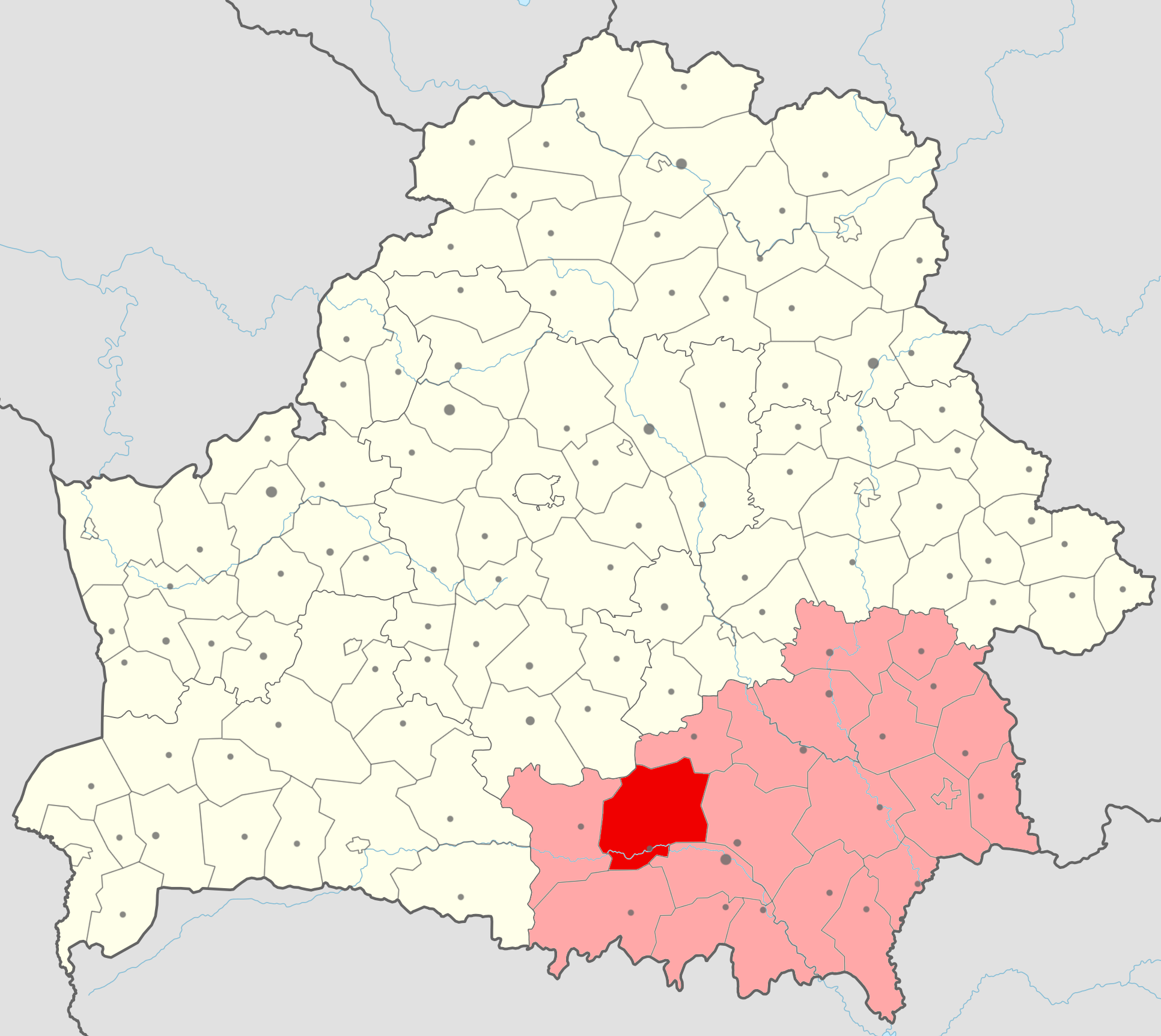
- Country: Belarus
- Region: Gomel region
- Administrative center: Pyetrykaw

Area
  - Total: 2,835.18 km^{2} (1,094.67 sq mi)

Population (2024)
  - Total: 25,531
  - Density: 9.0051/km^{2} (23.323/sq mi)
- Time zone: UTC+3 (MSK)

Pyetrykaw district or Pietrykaŭ district (Belarusian: Петрыкаўскі раён, romanized: Pietrykaŭski rajon; Russian: Петриковский район) is a district (raion) of Gomel region in Belarus. Its administrative center is Pyetrykaw. As of 2024, it has a population of 25,531.

== Notable residents ==
- Aleś Dudar (1904, Navasiolki village – 1937), Belarusian poet, critic, translator and a victim of Stalin's Great Purge
- Mikhail Marynich (1940, Staryja Haloǔčycy village – 2014), Belarusian diplomat, public figure and political prisoner
