= Jens Geier =

German politician (born 1961)

Jens Geier MEP
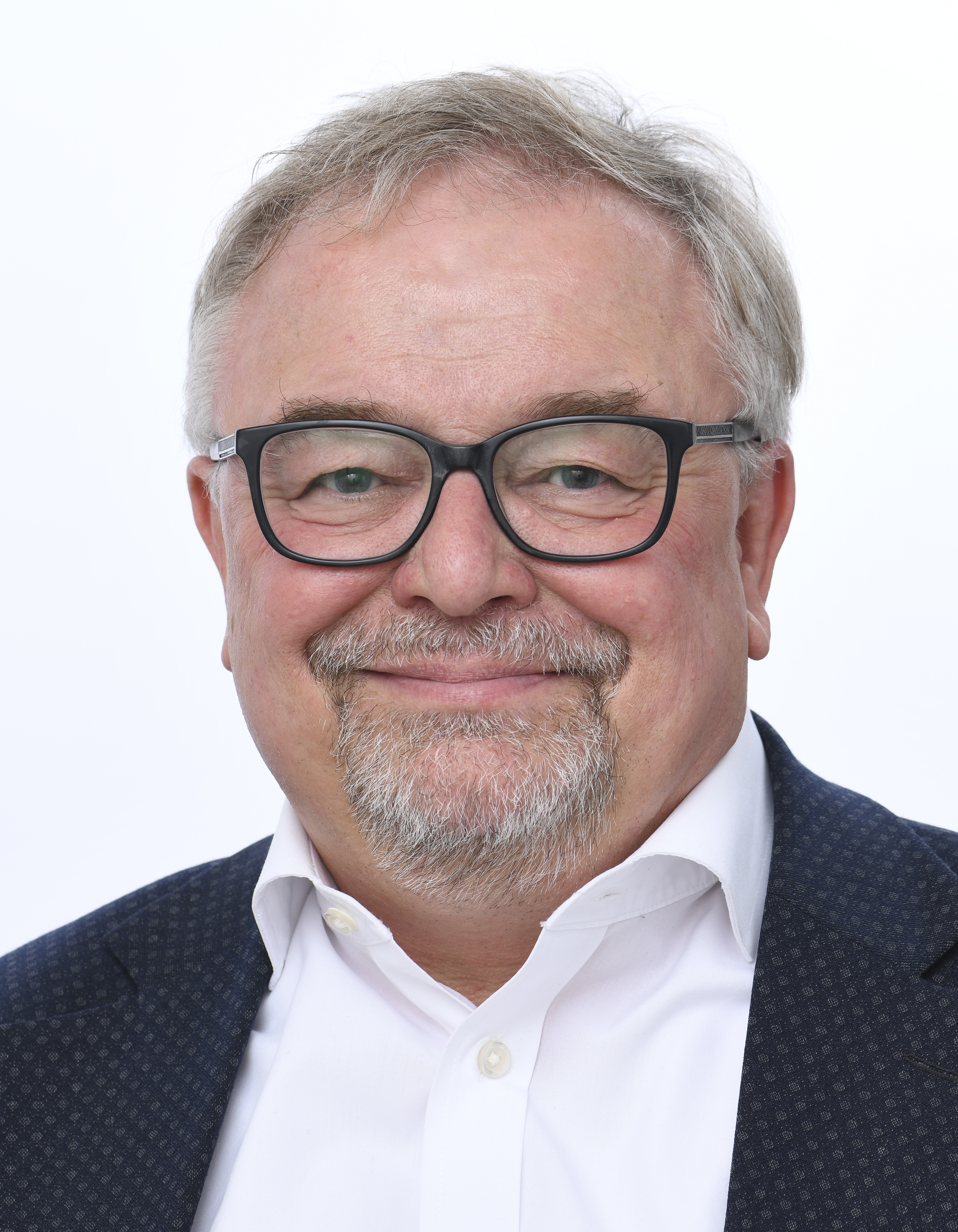
- Official portrait, 2024

Member of the European Parliament
- Incumbent
- Assumed office 14 July 2009
- Constituency: Germany

Personal details
- Born: 22 June 1961 (age 65) Frankfurt, West Germany
- Party: German: Social Democratic Party; EU: Party of European Socialists
- Website: www.jens-geier.de

Jens Geier (born 22 June 1961) is a German politician who has been serving as a member of the European Parliament since 2009. He is a member of the Social Democratic Party of Germany, part of the Party of European Socialists.

== Early life and career ==
Geier was born in Frankfurt. After graduating from Ruhr University Bochum in 1989, Geier worked as a research assistant to Social Democrat MEP Detlev Samland. From 1992 to 1999 he worked for the executive of the Social Democratic Party, first for the party's leader, Björn Engholm, and then for the deputy leader, Heidemarie Wieczorek-Zeul. Geier stood unsuccessfully for the European Parliament in both 1999 and 2004. He worked as a public relations officer for the North Rhine-Westphalia branch of the SPD from 1999 until 2001.

Geier then spent five years working for Projekt Ruhr GmbH, a regional development agency, before taking up a position at Deloitte in 2006.

== Political career ==
=== Member of the European Parliament, 2009-present ===
Geier was elected to the European Parliament at his third attempt in 2009. From 2009 to 2019, he served on the Committee on Budgets and the Committee on Budgetary Control. In 2012, he was the parliament’s rapporteur for that year’s report of the European Court of Auditors on the European Union’s spending. Following the 2014 European elections, he has elected Vice-Chair of the Committee on Budgets, under the leadership of chairman Jean Arthuis. In this capacity, he has served as the parliament’s rapporteur on the 2017 budget of the European Union and on the European Labour Authority (ELA).

In addition to his committee assignments, Geier has served as a member of the parliament's delegations for relations with the United States and Japan. He is also part of the European Parliament Intergroup on Integrity (Transparency, Anti-Corruption and Organized Crime), the European Parliament Intergroup on Trade Unions and the European Parliament Intergroup on Western Sahara.

Since January 2017, Geier has been serving as leader of the SPD group within the Progressive Alliance of Socialists and Democrats.

Following the 2019 European elections, Geier moved to the Committee on Industry, Research and Energy. In this capacity, he served as the parliament's rapporteur on a non-binding 2021 motion in support of using “low-carbon hydrogen” made from fossil gas as a bridge towards 100% renewable production.

On 30 June 2021 Geier took on a godparenthood of Dzianis Urad, Belarusian political prisoner.

=== Role in national politics ===
In the negotiations to form a coalition government under the leadership of Chancellor Angela Merkel following the 2017 federal elections, Geier was part of the SPD delegation in the working group on European policy, led by Peter Altmaier, Alexander Dobrindt and Martin Schulz.

In the negotiations to form a so-called traffic light coalition of the SPD, the Green Party and the Free Democratic Party (FDP) following the 2021 federal elections, Geier was again part of his party's delegation in the working group on European affairs, this time co-chaired by Udo Bullmann, Franziska Brantner and Nicola Beer.

== Other activities ==
- Business Forum of the Social Democratic Party of Germany, Member of the Political Advisory Board (since 2018)
- Westdeutscher Rundfunk (WDR), Alternate Member of the Broadcasting Council (since 2001)
- Karl Funke Foundation, Member of the Board
- German United Services Trade Union (ver.di), Member
- Workers’ Welfare Association (AWO), Member
