= Pyetrykaw =

Town in Gomel Region, Belarus

Pyetrykaw Петрыкаў (Belarusian) Петриков (Russian)
- Town
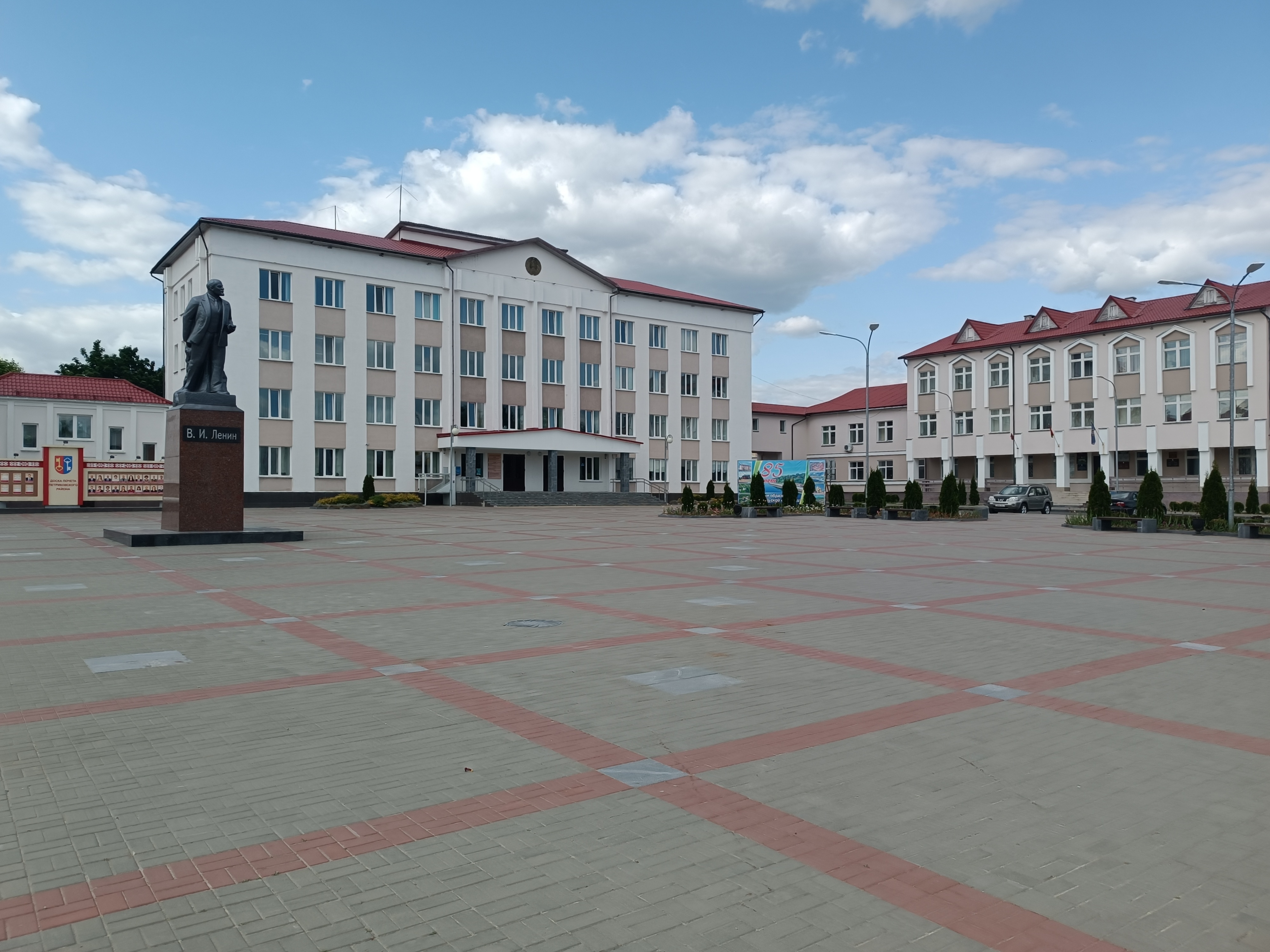
- Administration building

- Flag Coat of arms

- Location within Belarus
- Coordinates: 52°08′N 28°30′E
- Country: Belarus
- Region: Gomel Region
- District: Pyetrykaw District

Population (2025)
  - Total: 10,278
- Time zone: UTC+3 (MSK)
- Postal code: 247911-247912
- Area code: +375 2350
- License plate: 3
- Website: www.petrikov.gov.by

Pyetrykaw or Petrikov (Belarusian: Петрыкаў, romanized: Pietrykaŭ; Russian: Петриков; Polish: Petryków) is a town in Gomel Region, in southern Belarus. It serves as the administrative center of Pyetrykaw District. At the 2009 census, its population was 10,591. As of 2025, it has a population of 10,278.

== Geography ==
Pyetrykaw is located on the left (north) bank of the Pripyat River, 89 kilometres (55 mi) west of Mazyr and 190 kilometres (118 mi) west of the city of Gomel, the regional capital.

== History ==
Before 1500, the history of Pyetrykaw is that of the Principality of Turov and Pinsk. Thus it passed under control of the Kingdom of Galicia–Volhynia in the early 13th century, and was devastated in 1240 by the Mongols, and thereafter remained under the titular control of the Golden Horde until it joined the Grand Duchy of Lithuania in the early 14th century. In 1502 and 1521 the area was attacked by Tatars from the newly independent Crimean Khanate.

The first written mention of Pyetrykaw goes back to the year 1523, where the community was under the Olelkovich family's Principality of Slutsk–Kapyl, part of the Grand Duchy of Lithuania. The town became part of the Polish–Lithuanian Commonwealth in 1569, and so remained until its annexation by the Russian Empire at the second partition of Poland in 1793. Pyetrykaw was administratively placed in the Mozyrsky Uyezd of Minsk Governorate. By the 19th century, it had come under the control of the Chodkiewicz noble family.

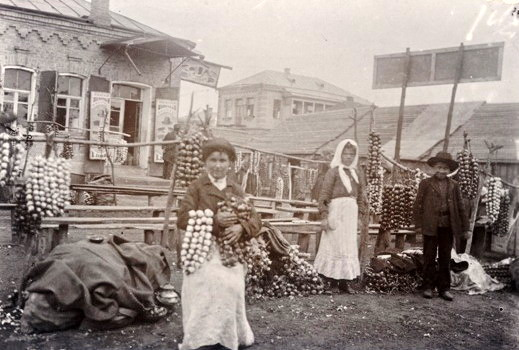
Pyetrykaw market, onions and garlic, 1912

In 1900, Pyetrykaw was located in the Pale of Settlement, an area of the Russian Empire that allowed resident Jews and thus had a Jewish community of 2,151, 38.8% of the total population. The town was occupied by the Germans in World War I. It was taken by the Poles in 1920–1921, during the Polish-Soviet War. Pyetrykaw received its status as a town in 1923.

During World War II, the town was first occupied by the Soviet Union and then by the Germans who exterminated the Jewish community. Pyetrykaw was taken from the Germans on 30 June 1944 as part of Operation Bagration by the soldiers of the 55th Mozyr Red Rifle Division of the 61st Army of the 1st Belorussian Front and sailors of the 20th Brigade of the Dnieper Flotilla. More than 3,000 casualties were suffered by the Soviet troops during the battle for Pyetrykaw.

Pyetrykaw is located in the area affected by the Chernobyl disaster.

== Notable people ==
- Lev Leitman (1896–1974). Belarusian graphic artist and teacher. He worked in easel graphics, primarily in watercolor and gouache. His works include landscapes, portraits, still lifes, industrial-themed paintings, and views of Vitebsk and Minsk.
- Valentina Vergey (born 1946). Belarusian historian and archaeologist. His main research interests include the historiography of Belarusian archaeology and the Iron Age population of Belarusian Polesie. She discovered and studied approximately 100 archaeological sites in Belarusian Polesie.
- Mikhail Kebets (1949–2005). Belarusian artist. He worked primarily in watercolor. His main works include the paintings "Forest Road," "May," "Spring on Mukhatsy"; and the series "Pa Palessyu" and "Berasceyshchyna." He also painted portraits. The works are in the Brest Museum of Local History.

== Economy ==
Among the first industries in Pyetrykaw were the construction of barges for the river traffic and a brick factory. During the Soviet era the shipyard was expanded and various small manufacturing plants were built, including a bread factory. The town depends upon both river traffic and road traffic for much of its livelihood. There are good road connections with Gomel, Brest and Mazyr. There is no bridge across the Pripyat, but there is regular ferry service.

The regional newspaper Петрыкаўскія навіны ("Pyetrykaw News") is published there.
