= Anani Dziakaŭ =

Anani Dziakaŭ (October 1, 1896 – October 29, 1937) was a Belarusian teacher. He was the fourth president of the Belarusian State University from 1934–1935. During the Great Purge, he was killed in the 1937 mass execution of Belarusians.

== Biography ==
He came from a peasant family in Bogdanovka in the Smolensk Governorate. He graduated from elementary school.

He participated in World War I. For bravery in battle, he received the rank of officer. In 1918 he joined the CPSU (b) and headed the Vyazemsky Land Department. In 1919–1923 he served in the Red Army as a company commander. In 1923 he became Deputy Chairman of the Mstsislaw District Executive Committee. In 1924 he was appointed deputy chairman (later chairman) of the Mogilev district executive committee.

In July 1928 he was sent to study at the Industrial Academy in Moscow but did not have to study, as he was appointed deputy chairman (later chairman) of the Vitebsk executive committee. From 1930–1934 he studied in Moscow at the Institute of the Red Professorship.

From February 1934 – Deputy Rector, Rector of the Belarusian State University. From the autumn of 1935 he was the head of the CEC department of the Belarusian Soviet Socialist Republic. In July 1936 he was appointed People's Commissar of Education of the BSSR.

He was arrested on May 11, 1937 in Minsk. He was convicted on October 28, 1937 as "a pest in the field of public education" and a "member of a national-fascist organization that carried out malicious work in the field of public education".

That body sentenced him to death with confiscation of his property. He was shot on October 29, 1937 in the NKVD internal prison in Minsk during a mass shooting. He was rehabilitated by the military board of the Supreme Court of the USSR on April 3, 1957 due to the absence of a crime. The personal file of D. № 10175-c is kept in the archives of the KGB of Belarus.

He was married and raised two children. On September 22, 1937, his wife Dyakova Maria Ivanovna was arrested in Minsk. On November 28, 1937, she was sentenced by a special decree of the NKVD as "the wife of a traitor to the motherland" to eight years in the camps. She served her sentence in the Kazakh Soviet Socialist Republic. She was released on September 22, 1945; her further fate is unknown. She was rehabilitated on June 8, 1956.
