= Platon Halavach =

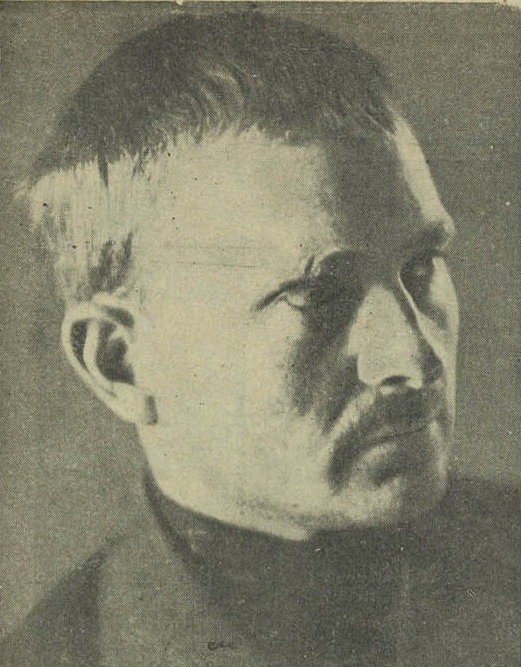
Platon Halavach

Platon Halavach (Belarusian: Платон Раманавіч Галавач; Russian: Плато́н Рома́нович Голова́ч; 1903 – October 29, 1937) was a Belarusian writer and editor. During the Great Purge he was a victim of the 1937 mass execution of Belarusians.

== Biography ==
He was born into a peasant family, then left an orphan at an early age to work as a shepherd from the age of seven. He studied at a parochial school, where he began to participate in a literary circle during his school years.

He was an organizer for the Komsomol movement in his volost, creating a Komsomol cell in his native village in 1920. He actively participated in eliminating illiteracy among the adult population by organizing clubs and reading rooms. Together with other Komsomol members, he delivered newspapers from Babruysk. He became a village correspondent for the district newspaper “Kamunist”, writing articles about the life of the village Komsomol cell.

In conditions when rural activists were killed in the volost by Stanisław Bułak-Bałachowicz's forces, Halavach worked in the most critical areas. The Babruysk district committee noticed him and sent him to study at the Minsk Party School. In 1926 he graduated from the Communist University of Belarus.

In 1922 to 1923 he worked as an instructor in the Barysaw district committee of the Komsomol. Then in 1923 he joined the Russian Communist Party (Bolsheviks), later renamed the All-Union Communist Party (Bolsheviks). Beginning in 1926 he became the head of the organizational department of the Komsomol of Belarus, two years later in 1928 he became the first secretary of the Central Committee of the Komsomol in Belarus. He edited the newspaper “Chyrvonaya Zmena” (English: "Red Successors") and the literary magazines “Maladnyak” and “Polymya”, while carrying out extensive social, educational and educational work.

From 1923 to 1928 he headed the literary organization Maladnyak. In November 1928, the association was reorganized into the Belarusian Association of Proletarian Writers.

He was elected a member of the Central Committee of the Communist Party of Belarus (1927-1930) and the Central Executive Committee of the BSSR (1927–1935). In 1934 he was admitted to the Union of Writers of the USSR.

== Purge and rehabilitation ==
In the 1930s, Halavach, like most of those associated with Maladnyak, was repressed. In 1937, he was arrested, the investigators confiscated 67 notebooks of manuscripts (perhaps among them was the novel "He"). In connection with the arrest, he was expelled from the Communist Party of Ukraine.

His trial was on October 28th 1937, lasting fifteen minutes. He pleaded guilty, and the troika of the NKVD convicted him as an "organizer of a terrorist group" and for "carrying out German-fascist activities" to the highest penalty with confiscation of property.

He was shot a few hours after the verdict in the Minsk NKVD prison. It was announced to the family that he died on December 25, 1944 in the camp from heart failure. He was rehabilitated in 1956.

== Family ==
He was married to Nika Feodorovna Vechar (born in 1905 in the village of Mashchytsia, Slutsk District, Minsk Province), and together they raised two children. His wife was arrested on November 5th, 1937 in Minsk, and on November 28th 1937 she was sentenced by the NKVD as a "family member of a shot enemy of the motherland" to eight years and sent to the Karaganda concentration camp of the NKVD of the Kazakh SSR (Dalinskaya village). After her release, she returned to her homeland. Rehabilitated on July 24, 1956.

== Legacy ==
Halavach was also engaged in literary activities, making his debut in print in 1921. His first short story "Lost Life" was published in the newspaper "Soviet Belarus" in 1925. In 1927, the first book of short stories, "The Little Things of Life", was published. He is also the author of short story collections "I Want to Live" (1930), "Stories" (1934), short stories "Guilty" (1930), "Fright on the Corrals" (1930), "Dollars" (1931), "Bearers of Hate" (1936, magazine "Flame of the Revolution"), "They will not pass!" (1937, magazine "Flame of the Revolution"), the novel "Through the Years" (1935, republished in 1936, 1984), an essay on the construction of the White Sea-Baltic Canal "From Bear Mountain to the White Sea" (1934).

Many of his works remained unfinished, including a book about the uprising of 1863–1864 and Kastus Kalinowski. A partial list of his work includes;

- Загубленае жыццё / “Wasted Life” (1925),
- Мелочи жизни / “Little things in life” (1927),
- Хочется жить / “I want to live” (1930),
- Виноватый / “Guilty” (1930),
- Переполох на межах / “Trouble in the Borders” (1930),
- Доллары / "Dollars" (1931),
- Рассказы / "Mountain to the White Sea” (1934),
- Сквозь годы / “Through the Years” (1935),
- Носители ненавист / “Carriers of Hate” (1936),
- Они не пройдут! / “They will not pass!” (1937).

Halavach's works have been translated into Russian, Polish, Ukrainian, Czech, Hebrew and other languages.

== Bibliography ==
- Ліўшыц, У. Платон Галавач: лёс чалавека і пісьменніка// Брама. 2016.Вып.4.— Мн.: С.245-258.
- Луфераў М., Платон Галавач, в кн.: Гiсторыя беларускай савецкай лiтаратуры, т. 1. — Miнск, 1964. (in Belarusian)
- Каленкович И. Творчество Платона Головача: (Жанрово-стилевое своеобразие): Автореферат дис. … канд. филол. н. — Мн., 1979;
- ЭГБ, т. 2.

== Sources ==
- ГАЛАВАЧ ПЛАТОН РАМАНАВІЧ (in Belarusian)
