= Julij Taŭbin =

Belarusian poet

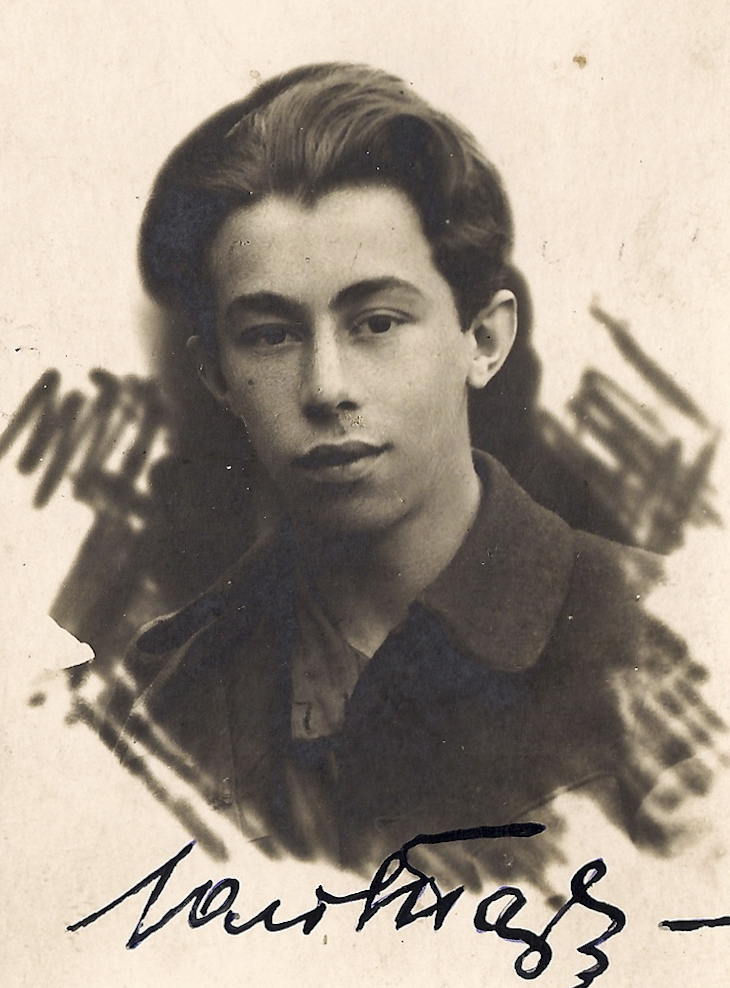
- Born: 15 September 1911; Ostrogozhsk, Russian Empire
- Died: 30 October 1937; Minsk, USSR
- Citizenship: USSR
- Occupation(s): poet, translator

Julij Taŭbin (September 15, 1911 – October 30, 1937) was a Belarusian poet, translator.

== Biography ==
Julij Taŭbin was born on September 15, 1911, in Ostrogozhsk. In 1921 he moved with his parents to Mscisłaŭ. Until 1928 he studied at the local school. From 1928 to 1931 he studied at the local Pedagogical College and from 1931 to 1933 at the Pedagogical University in Minsk. At this time, Taŭbin became a member of the Belarusian Association of Proletarian Writers and the informal literary group TAVIZ, abbreviation of Tavarystva Amataraw Vypic' i Zakusic' (English: Society of those who Like to Drink Alcohol and Eat Snacks Afterwards).

Taŭbin was arrested on February 25, 1933. On August 10, 1933 he was sentenced to two years of exile in the Ural region. During the exile he lived in Tyumen. According to one of the poet's contemporaries, the reason for the first arrest was a letter from the poet’s aunt who allegedly moved from Poland to America. On November 4, 1936 Taŭbin was arrested once again and transferred to Minsk. On October 29, 1937 The Military Collegium of the Supreme Court of the Soviet Union sentenced him to the capital punishment. On the night of October 29, 1937 Taŭbin and 25 other Belarusian writers were executed in the courtyard of an NKVD prison. He was politically rehabilitated in the first case on August 24, 1956, and in the second case on July 29, 1957.

== Writing ==
Julij Taŭbin is a representative of the Belarusian urban poetry of the 1920s and 1930s. His course towards assimilation of European classical poetry was a continuation of the tradition of Maxim Bogdanovich and early Alexander Pushkin. Taŭbin read and understood the original poems of English, French, German and Polish writers. He also got acquainted in the original with Italian and Dutch poetry. He translated poetry of foreign authors almost flawlessly, although he practically did not learn the grammar of these languages.

Taŭbin began to publish in 1926 in various periodicals. In the particularly fruitful period of 1930–1932, the poet published five books: collections of poems "Lights" (Belarusian: Агні; 1930), "To live, sing and not grow old..." (Belarusian: Каб жыць, спяваць і не старэць...; 1931), "Three poems" (Belarusian: Тры паэмы; 1931), "My second book" (Belarusian: Мая другая кніга; 1932) and the poem "Taurida" (Belarusian: Таўрыда; 1932). After the poet's death, two of his anthologies were published: "Selected Poems" (Belarusian: Выбраныя вершы; 1957) and "Poems" (Belarusian: Вершы; 1969). The poem "Doctor Baturin" (Belarusian: Доктар Батурын) remained unfinished. The prepared book "Lyrics. Epic" (Belarusian: Лірыка. Эпас) was never published.

Being exiled to Tyumen, Taŭbin started writing in Russian. In 1934–1935 he created two poems: "Mikhailo" (Russian: Михайло) and "The Siege" (Russian: Осада). Also in print were two of his Russian-language poems – "To Friends" (Russian: Друзьям; Znamya, 1936, No. 5) and "Teddy" (Russian: Тедди; Ogoniok, 1936, No. 22).

Shortly before his arrest, he sent to the Leningrad branch of the "Khudozhestvennaya Literatura" publishing house a selection of Russian translations of poems by Alfred Edward Housman, William Butler Yeats and Gilbert Keith Chesterton, which were later included in the Anthology of New English Poetry collection (published 20 days after the poet was executed).

The first collection of Taŭbin's works after political rehabilitation was published in 1957 by his friend Arkadi Kuleshov.
