= Dzianis Urad =

Belarusian political prisoner (born 1991)

- Дзяніс Урад
- Born: 23 June 1991 (age 35); Rassony, Viciebsk Region of Belarus
- Education: Belarusian Military Academy
- Occupation: special liaison officer
- Employer: the Belarusian Armed Forces’ General Staff

Dzianis Urad (Belarusian: Дзяніс Урад, also known as Denis Urad; born 23 June 1991) is a former special liaison officer of the Belarusian Armed Forces’ General Staff and a political prisoner.

== Biography ==
Urad was born on 23 June 1991 in Rasony, Viciebsk Region of Belarus.

He graduated from the Belarusian Military Academy at the Faculty of Communications and Automated Control Systems in 2014.

Urad is married and has a child.

== Political activism and 18 years’ sentence ==
During the 2020-21 Belarusian Protests Urad sent to opposition media a copy of a letter in which Belarus’ Interior Minister Ivan Kubrakou demanded the defence minister involve the army in suppressing protests.

On 14 May 2021 the supreme court of Belarus sentenced Urad to 18 years in prison for treason. "Urad's action ... has caused significant harm to national interests," state prosecutor Mikhail Kavaliou declared.

Belarusian human rights organisation "Viasna" declared Urad a political prisoner:

“According to the Law on Information, Informatization and Protection of Information, access to information, dissemination and (or) provision of information on violations of the law and information reflecting the state of public safety may not be restricted.

Thus, there is no doubt that Dzianis Urad acted in the public interest, while the justification by the Minister of the Interior of involving the military in police functions by the alleged purpose of “protecting critical facilities”, including those “posing an increased danger to human life and health” is nothing but a manipulation of the law”.

Jens Geier, member of the European Parliament, has taken over the godparenthood of Dzianis Urad as part of Libereco’s #WeStandBYyou solidarity campaign.
