= Yakau Branshteyn =

Yakau Anatolevich Branshteyn (Belarusian: Якаў Анатолевіч Бранштэйн, Russian: Яков Анатольевич Бронштейн, Yakov Anatolyevich Bronshteyn; November 10, 1897 - October 29, 1937) was a Belarusian literary critic. He was born in Bielsk Podlaski in the Grodno Governorate of the Russian Empire (present-day Poland). During the Great Purge, he was shot as part of the 1937 mass execution of Belarusians. After the death of Joseph Stalin, he was rehabilitated.
