= Anatol Volny =

Belarusian artist, writer, and journalist

- Анатоль Вольны
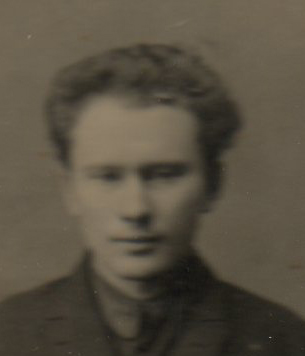
- Born: Анатоль Іўсцінавіч Ажгірэй; 2 December 1902; Pukhavichy, Igumensky, Minsk Governorate, Russian Empire
- Died: 29 October 1937 (aged 34); Minsk, Byelorussian SSR, Soviet Union
- Occupations: Writer, poet, journalist
- Writing career
- Notable awards: Honored Art Worker of the BSSR (1935)

Anatol Iustsinavich Azhgirey (Belarusian: Анатоль Іўсцінавіч Ажгірэй; 1902 – 29 October 1937), better known by the literary pseudonym of Anatol Volny (Belarusian: Анатоль Вольны) was a Belarusian artist, poet, writer and journalist. During the Great Purge, he became a victim of the 1937 mass execution of Belarusians. He was posthumously rehabilitated in 1957.

== Biography ==
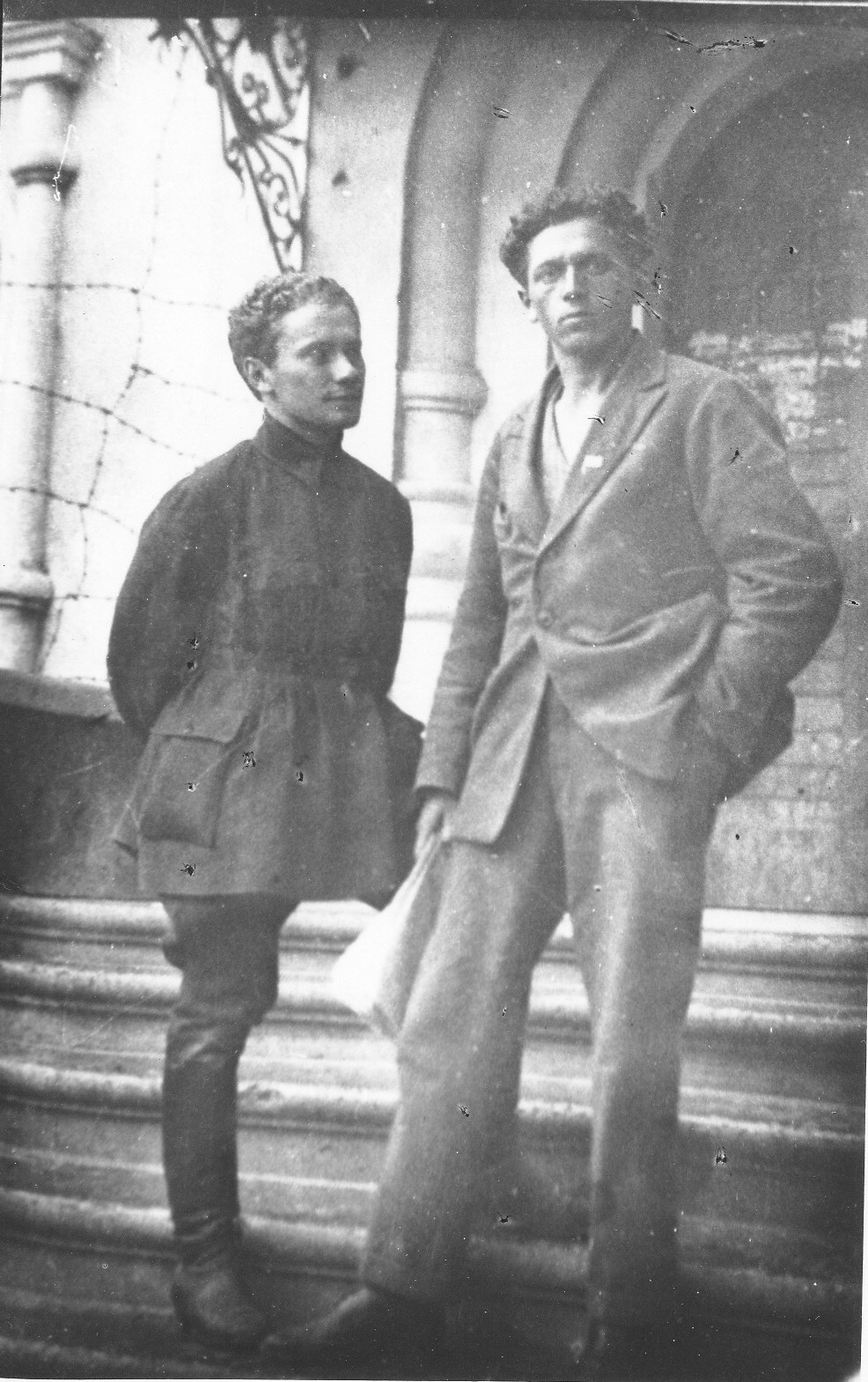
Volny (left) and Michaś Čarot

Azhgirey's father was a civil servant. In 1911, he entered the Abbot's Gymnasium, where he received his secondary education. He graduated from the Marinagore Railway School of the 2nd degree. In 1920, he joined the Red Army as a volunteer, and took part in battles with the interventionists. After demobilization in 1921, he worked in the Central Committee of the LKSM, at the newspaper Moladi Arati. He studied at BSU. In the 1920s and 1930s, he was an active participant in the literary and artistic movement in Belarus. From 1923 he was a member of the Maladnyak literary association, and from 1928 - in Polimi. He was a member of the SP of the BSSR (from 1934). He was married, with one child.

Azhgirey was arrested on 4 November 1936 in Minsk. On 28 October 1937, as a "member of a counter-revolutionary organization", he was convicted by an extrajudicial body of the National Security Service of Ukraine to the VMP. His property was confiscated, and he was executed by shooting in Minsk on 29 October 1937.

He was posthumously rehabilitated by the military panel of the Supreme Court of the USSR on 3 December 1957. The personal file of A. Volny No. 11054-c is kept in the archive of the KGB of Belarus.

== Creativity ==
He made his debut in print in 1922. One of the pioneers of the adventure genre in Belarusian prose. Author of collections of poetry "Kamsamolskaya nota" (1924, with A. Aleksandrovich)[1], "Black-haired joy" (1926), "To you" (1927). In 1925, the novel "Wolves" was published (co-authored with A. Aleksandrovich and A. Dudar). Author of the short stories "Two" (1925), "Anton Savitsky" (1927, "Soviet Belarus" newspaper). The author of a collection of feuilletons (1927) and a book of humor and feuilletons "Neighbors" (1932), which were published under the pseudonym Alyosha.

Wrote plays, dramatized campaigns ("When the old man tells the truth", "Mykolka", "At the farmer's house" - 1924), the comedy "Save me, God!" (with R. Kobets, 1932) [1]. He also worked as a film dramaturg - his scripts were used to produce the films "The Pines Are Roaring" (with K. Dzerzhaviny, 1929), "Savoy Hotel" (1930), "Born in Fire" (1930), "Sunny Hike" (1931), "New Homeland" (1935) and others. In 1935, the short story "The Sixtieth Parallel" was released.

== Bibliography ==
Komsomol note: Poems. Mn., 1924 (with A. Aleksandrovich); Wolves: A Novel of Belarusian Forests / Author. A. Aleksandrovich, A. Dudar. Mn., 1925 (2nd ed. 1929); Two: A story. Mn., 1925; Black-curled joy: Poems. Mn., 1926; Wrestler: Collection. Mn., 1927; A collection of feuilletons. Mn., 1927; To you: Poems. Mn., 1927; Neighbors: Humorous and feuilletons. Mn., 1932; The Sixtieth Parallel: A Cinematic Story. Mn., 1935.

== Footnotes ==
Free Anatoly // Biographical directory. — Mn.: "Belarusian Soviet Encyclopedia" named after Petrus Brovka, 1982. — Vol. 5. — P. 124. — 737 p.

== Literature ==
Repressed writers, scientists, education workers, public and cultural figures of Belarus. Encyclopedic guide in 10 volumes (15 books). T. 1. Abramovich-Kushal. / Contributed by L. U. Marakov. — Smolensk, 2003. — 480 p. — ISBN 985-6374-04-9.

Repressed writers, scientists, education workers, public and cultural figures of Belarus. Encyclopedic guide in 10 volumes (15 books). T. 3. Book 2 / Composed by L. U. Marakov. — Mn., 2005.

Eisenstadt G. Wait for us, stars!: Document. Essay on Koms. poet, journalist and screenwriter A. Volny // Banner of youth. 1978, Oct. 5;

Eisenstat G. Among the pioneers // Red change. 1981, April 21;

Brodyansky B. On the way to realism: About the work of film dramatist A. Volny // LiM. 1935, March 16;

Shushkevich S. Talent, hardened by October: To the 70th anniversary of the birth of A. Volny // LiM. 1972, December 1;

Shushkevich S. He is remembered with kind words // Shushkevich S. Selected. tv.: In 2 vols. Vol. 2. Mn., 1978;

Volny Anatol // Belarusian writers (1917-1990): Handbook / Compendium. A. K. Horditzki. Nov. ed. A. L. Sparrow. — Mn.: Art literature, 1994. — 653 p.: ill. — ISBN 5-340-00709-X.

Volny Anatoly // Belarusian writers: Biobibliographic dictionary. In 6 volumes / under the editorship. A. I. Maldisa. — Mn.: Belarusian Encyclopedia, 1992-1995. T.2.

== Links ==
Vasyl De Em (Vasyl Dranko-Maisyuk). Shot writers. Anatoly Volny, who mocked the victims of the first wave of repressions in 1930, and in 1937 there was no one to mock him // Radio Svaboda, October 11, 2017

== Regulatory control ==
LCCN: n95063737 · VIAF: 68177936 · WorldCat VIAF: 68177936
