= Valery Marakou =

Belarusian poet

- Валеры Маракоў
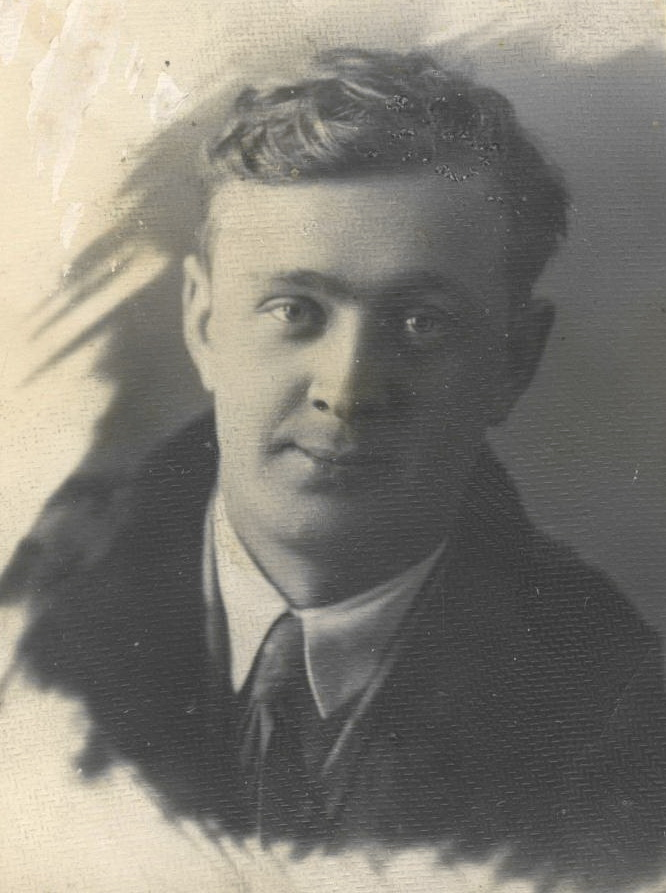
- Born: 27 March [O.S. 14 March] 1909; Minsk, Russian Empire
- Died: 29 October 1937 (aged 28); Minsk, USSR
- Occupation: Poet
- Writing career
- Language: Belarusian

Valery Marakou (Belarusian: Вале́рый Дзмі́трыевіч Марако́ў; Russian: Вале́рий Дми́триевич Моряко́в; 27 March [O.S. 14 March] 1909 – 29 October 1937) was a Belarusian poet and translator.

== Biography ==
First verses of poetry by Marakou were published as Petals in 1925 (as stated by Leanid Marakou, though the cover (illustrated) states 1926), and attracted the attention of the famous Belarusian poet Yanka Kupala who supported the young poet. During Marakou's short lifetime, four books of his poetry had been published.

In March 1935 Marakou was arrested by agents of the Cheka for the first time. He was arrested again on 6 November 1936.

In October 1937, after a year of torture, Marakou was charged with being "a member of a counter-revolutionary national-fascist organisation", at a session of NKVD's "troika". He was executed by firing squad in the 1937 mass execution of Belarusians on 29 October in the internal NKVD prison in Minsk, together with other 22 Belarusian intellectuals and social activists.

Valery Marakou was posthumously rehabilitated by a military board of the Supreme Court of the USSR on 23 April 1957.

The works of Valery Marakou were re-discovered for the Belarusian reader and his tragic fate were investigated by his nephew, the writer Leanid Marakou. Leanid Marakou has published a monograph dedicated to the life and works of the poet, and placed his uncle's books in electronic format (in Belarusian) on his web-site.

== Bibliography ==
Marakou's first book of poetry, Petals, was published in 1925

=== Poetry ===
- Marakou, Valery. Пялёсткі (Petals), Minsk 1925.
- Marakou, Valery. На залатым пакосе (On the Golden Mowing), 1927.
- Marakou, Valery. Вяршыні жаданняў. Паэзія (Summits of Wishes), 1930.
- Marakou, Valery. Права на зброю (Rights to the Weapon), 1933.
- Marakou, Valery. Лірыка (Lyrics), 1959.
- Marakou, Valery. Вяршыні жаданняў (Summits of Wishes), 1989.
- Marakou, Valery. Рабінавая ноч: Выбранае. Вершы, паэмы, проза, публіцыстыка, крытыка, пераклады (Ashberry Night, (selected works in poetry and prose)), 2003.

=== Biographies ===
- Marakou, Leanid. Valery Marakou. Fate, Chronicles, Context. Minsk, 1999. Monograph (in HTML) (in Belarusian)
