= Kurapaty =

Mass killing site in Belarus

Coordinates: 53°57.93′N 27°36.68′E

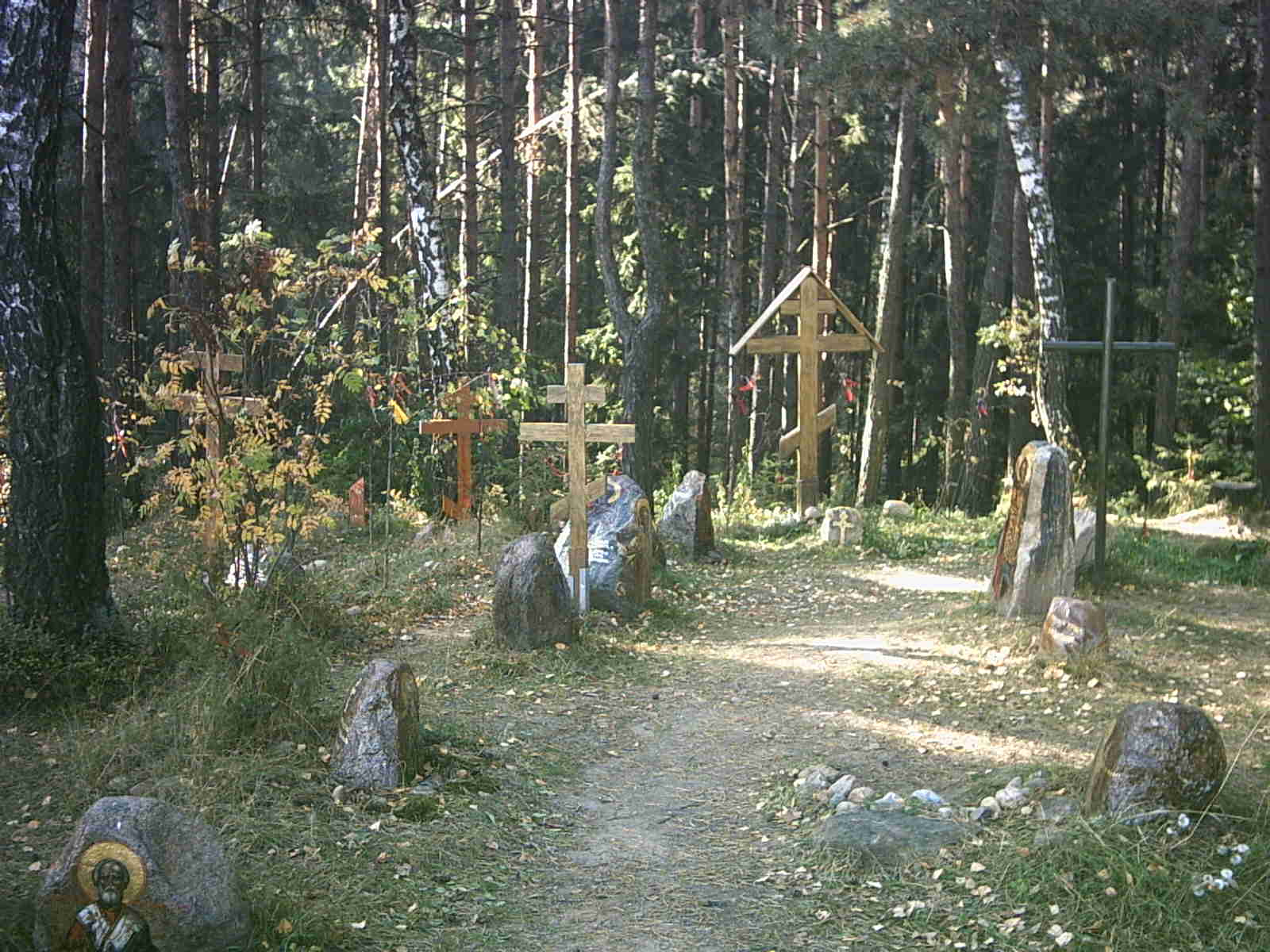
Kurapaty forest graves

Kurapaty (Belarusian: Курапаты, IPA: [kuraˈpatɨ]) is a wooded area on the outskirts of Minsk, Belarus, where a vast number of people were executed between 1937 and 1941 during the Great Purge by the Soviet secret police, the NKVD and in particular, during the Soviet repressions in Belarus.

The exact count of victims is uncertain, as NKVD archives are classified in Belarus. According to NKVD archives, up to 35,000 were shot in Byelorussia (Belarus) under Stalin, the vast majority of them during the Great Purge. According to various sources, the number of people who perished in Kurapaty is estimated to be at least 30,000 (according to the Attorney General of BSSR Tarnaŭski), up to 7,000 people (according to attorney general of Belarus Bozhelko), up to 100,000 people (according to "Belarus" reference book), from 102,000 to 250,000 people (according to the article by Zianon Pazniak in the "Litaratura i Mastactva" newspaper), 250,000 people (according to Polish historian and professor of University of Wrocław Zdzisław Julian Winnicki), and more (according to the British historian Norman Davies).

In 2004, Kurapaty mass graves were included in the register of the Cultural Properties of Belarus as a first-category cultural heritage.

== Discovery and remembrance ==
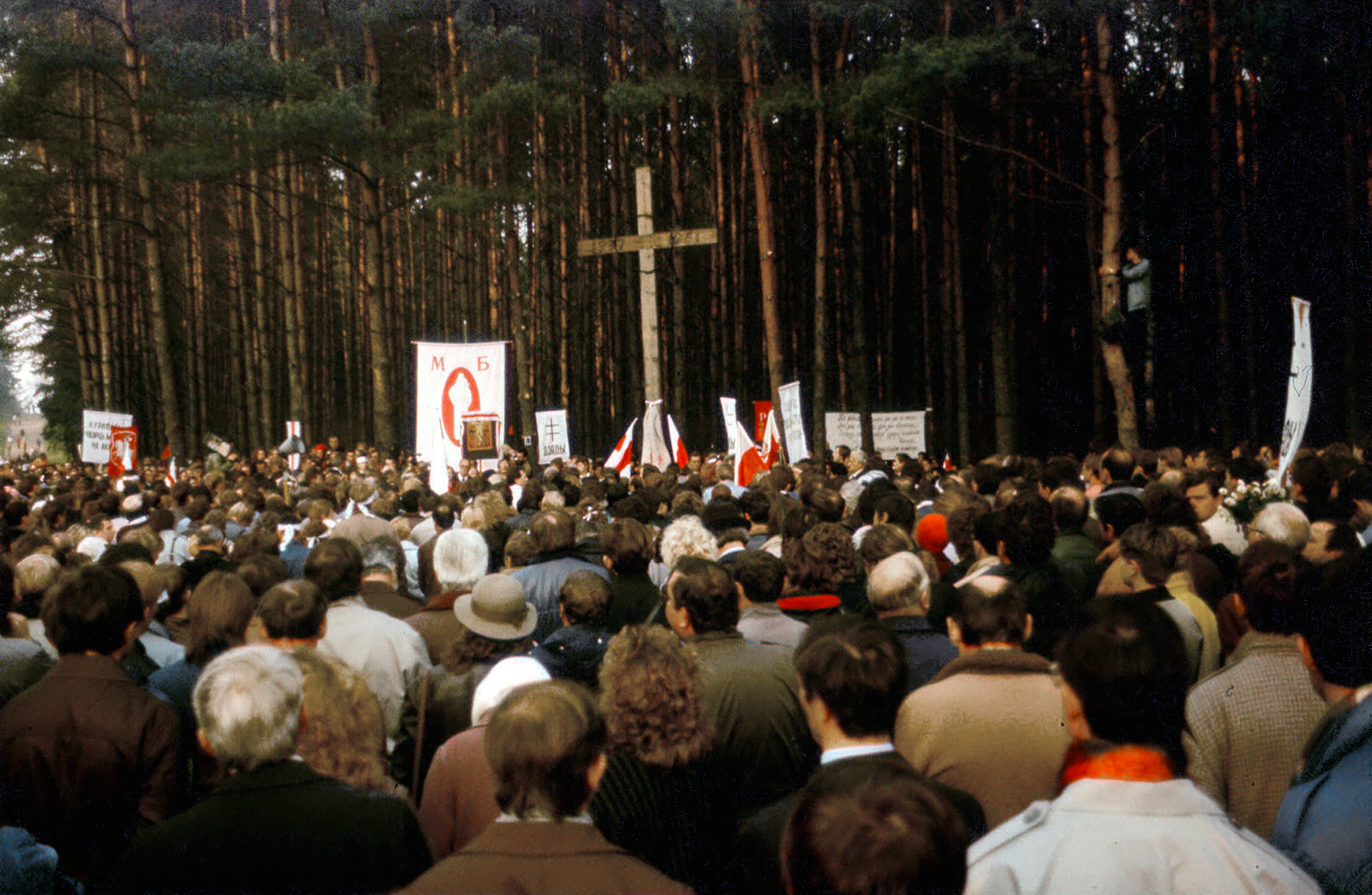
Meeting in Kurapaty, 1989

The discovery by historian Zianon Paźniak and exhumation of the remains in 1988 gave added momentum to the pro-democracy and pro-independence movement in Belarus in the last years of the Soviet Union before it was dissolved. There have been investigations by both the Soviet, and Belarusian governments, which have been conclusive as to the perpetrators were Soviet NKVD. This is based on former NKVD members' confessions and the eyewitness testimonies of 55 villagers, from villages such as Cna, Cna-Yodkava, Drazdova, Padbaloccie and others, who gave evidence that NKVD brought people in trucks and executed them during 1937–1941.

President of the United States Bill Clinton visited Kurapaty forest in 1994, when he came to Belarus with a "thank you" visit after Belarus agreed to transfer their post-Soviet nuclear weapons to Russia. Clinton gifted a small granite monument "To Belarusians from the American people", perhaps the first post-Soviet cultural artifact from the U.S. on the Belarusian soil. The monument was damaged three times by unidentified vandals, but subsequently restored.

In 2001, when the Kurapaty site was threatened by a planned widening of the Minsk Ring Road, youth from the Belarusian Popular Front, Zubr, and smaller organizations occupied the site and sat out a bitter winter in tents, trying to halt the road construction, however with no success.

On October 29, 2004, the Jewish community of Belarus installed a monument in memory of the Jews and other nationals who were murdered in Kurapaty forest. The brown granite stone has two inscriptions, in Yiddish and in Belarusian: "To our fellow-believers—Jews, Christians and the Muslims—the victims of Stalinism from the Belarusian Jews."

Each year in November, on Dziady (the All Saints or the day when Belarusians commemorate their deceased forefathers), hundreds of people visit this site of crimes of Soviet political repression.

== Gallery ==
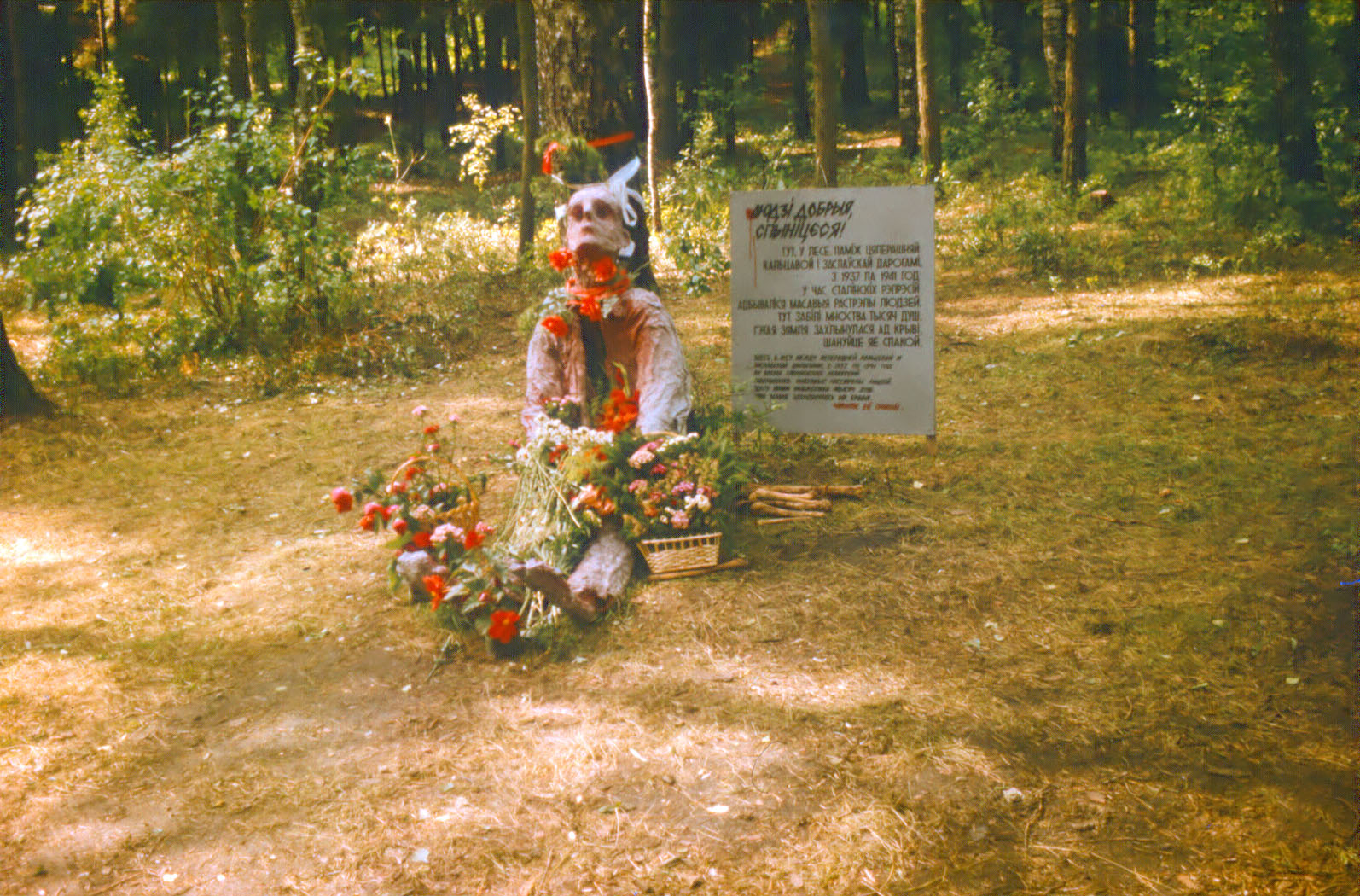
Kurapaty, 1989

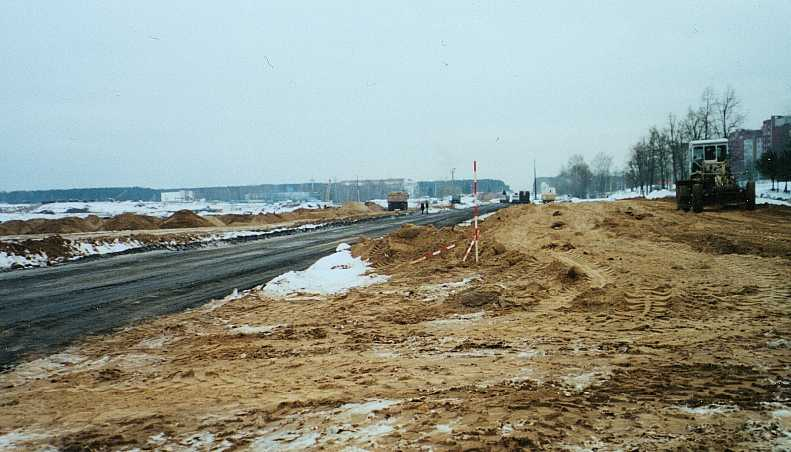
Minsk ring road under construction through the Kurapaty massacre site (2001)

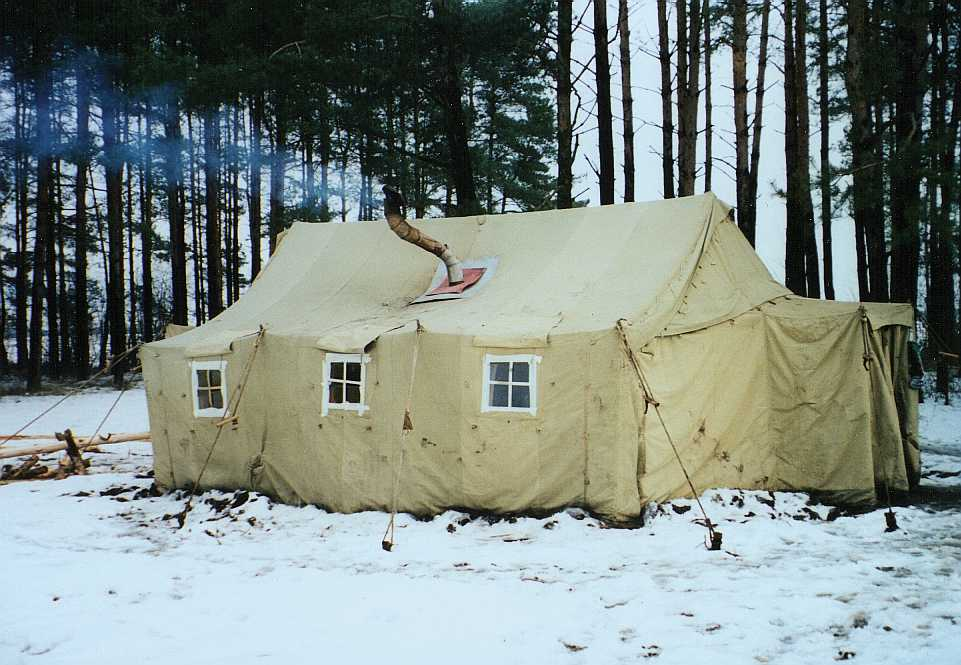
Protesters' tent (2001)

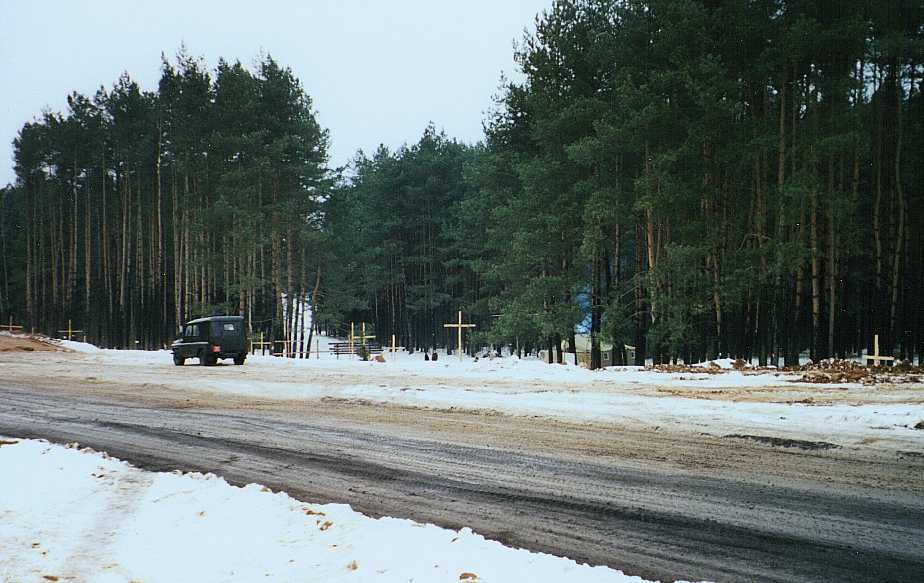
Police watch over protesters (2001)

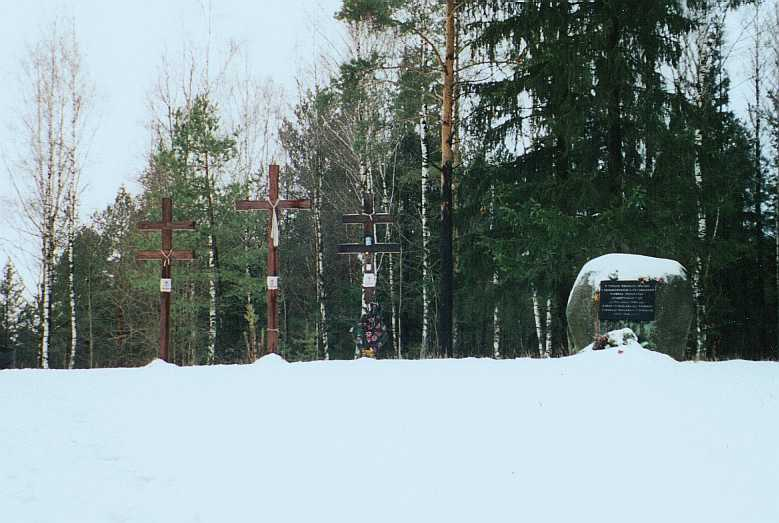
Crosses and 1989 memorial stone at center of site (2001)

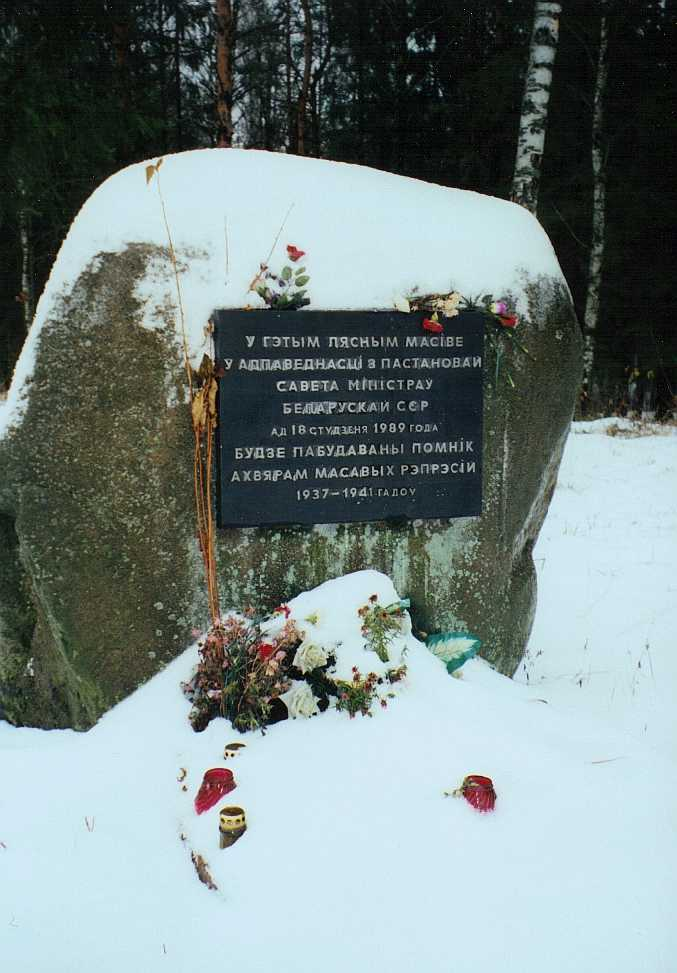
Close-up of memorial stone (2001)

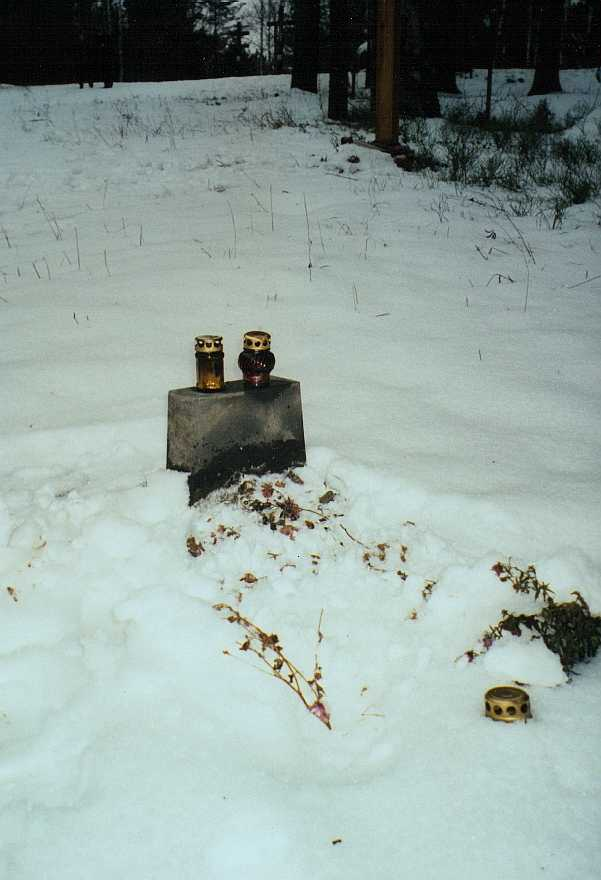
Remnant of a memorial placed by US President Bill Clinton, later destroyed (2001)

== See also ==
- Bykivnia
- Dem'ianiv Laz
- Great Purge
- Katyn massacre
- NKVD massacres of prisoners
- Vinnytsia massacre

== Bibliography ==
- Kuropaty: The Investigation of a Stalinist Historical Controversy by David R. Marples - Slavic Review Vol. 53, No. 2 (Summer, 1994), pp. 513–523
- 'Kurapaty The Road of Death' ISBN 5857001498
