= Leanid Marakou =

Belarusian journalist and writer

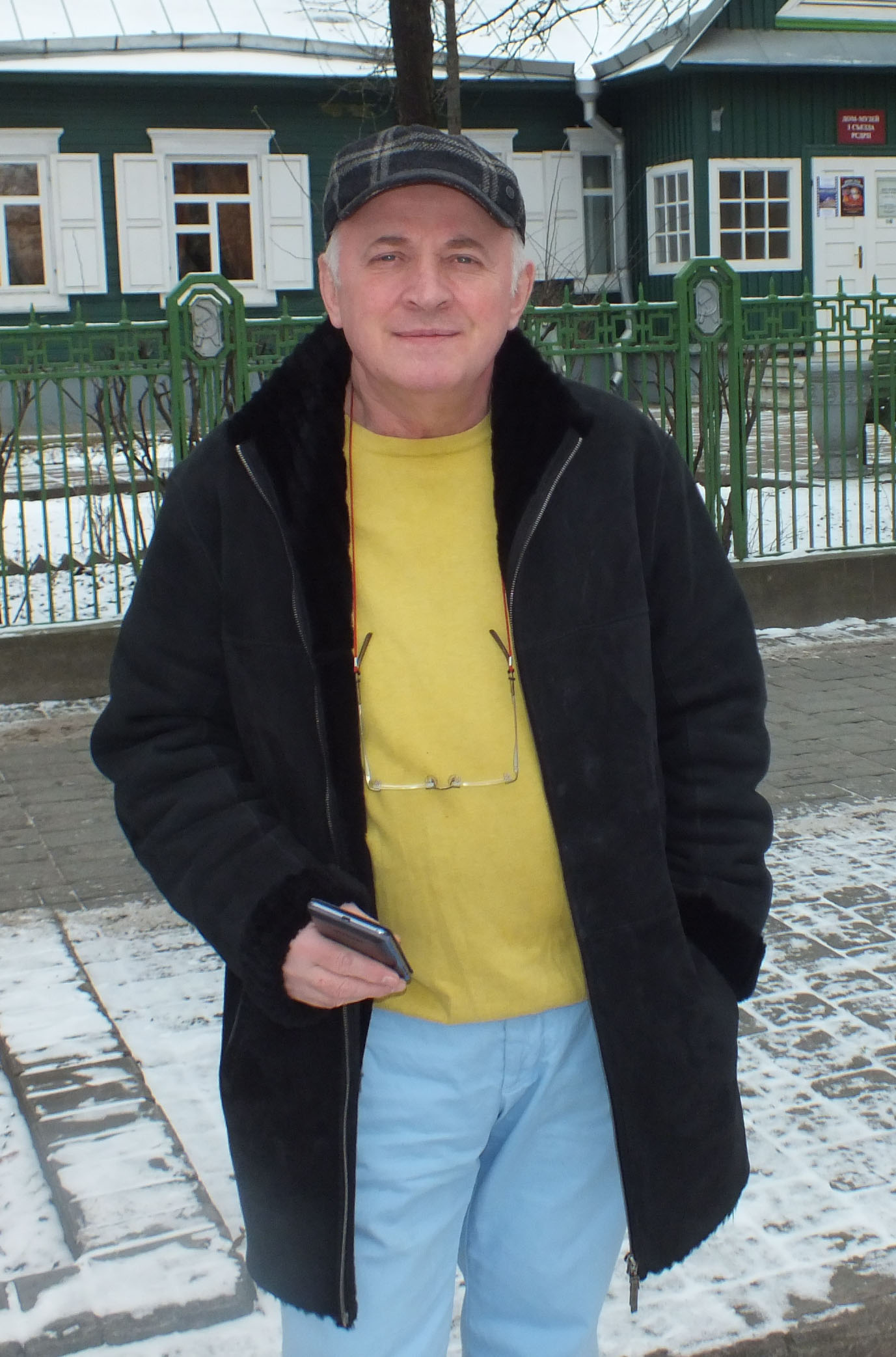
Leanid Marakou is a Belarusian journalist, writer.

Leanid Marakou (Belarusian: Леані́д Уладзі́міравіч Марако́ў; Russian: Леони́д Влади́мирович Моряко́в; April 15, 1958 in Minsk – December 17, 2016) was a Belarusian journalist, writer.

== Biography ==
Marakou's encyclopedia of Repressed Belarusians, including those who died under Joseph Stalin

Marakou (Belarusian: Леанід Маракоў, Russian: Леонид Моряков, pseudonyms: Vladimir Moryakov, Anatole Sinchukousky) graduated from the Minsk Radioengineering Institute in 1984. He worked as a maintenance engineer at the Minsk Computer Plant, then at the National Academy of Sciences of Belarus. In 1990s, Marakou became an importer of electronic equipment.

Marakou spent some years in the 1990s investigating the fate of his uncle, Valery Marakou, a poet in the 1930s, who was executed by the Bolsheviks. Study of the poet's biography, as well as those of other perished relatives had grown into a systematic and professional research of history of all repressed during the Stalin's period cultural and public figures of Belarus. That became also possible due to obtaining of temporary access to the classified archives of the KGB in Belarus.

== Authorship ==
Marakou is the author of a multi-volume directory "Repressed literary men, scientists, educators, public and cultural figures of Belarus. 1794-1991". The directory contains more than 20,000 biographies of Belarusians executed or who perished in Joseph Stalin's concentration camps (the Gulag).

Marakou's "Extermination" is a research book dedicated to repressions committed against Belarusian literary men, "Victims and Executioners", - a documentary investigation about the fate of the victims and their torturers during the period of mass executions of the 1930s, and the reference "Repressed Orthodox clergymen and priests of Belarus. 1917-1967".

Marakou's first short stories were published in 1998. Stories by Marakou often begin during Stalin's repressions and Leonid Brezhnev's stagnation, and trace the fate of people resisting the regime. Marakou is a member of the oppositional Union of Writers of Belarus and a member of the International PEN.

== Bibliography ==
1. "Valery Marakou. Fate. Chronicles. Context" Minsk, 1999 ("Валеры Маракоў. Лёс. Хроніка. Кантэкст". Мн., 1999)
2. "Extermination. Repressed Belarusian literary men. A reference book". Minsk 2000 ("Вынішчэнне. Рэпрэсаваныя беларускія літаратары. Даведнік." Мн., 2000)
3. "Recusants. Short stories". Minsk, 2001 ("Непамяркоўныя. Апавяданні". Мн., 2001)
4. "Recusants - II. Short stories". Minsk, 2001 ("Непамяркоўныя - ІІ. Апавяданні". Мн., 2001)
5. "The threesome. Short stories". Minsk, 2001 ("Трое. Апавяданні". Мн., 2001)
6. "100 miniatures. On life, death and love". Minsk, 2002 ("100 мініяцюр. Пра жыццё, смерць і каханне". Мн., 2002)
7. "100 miniatures. (Translation to the Russian language)". Minsk, 2002 ("100 миниатюр (перевод с белорусского языка)". Мн., 2002)
8. "Repressed Belarusian literary men. Encyclopaedic dictionary in two volumes. Volume I". Minsk, 2002 ("Рэпрэсаваныя беларускія літаратары. Энцыклапедычны даведнік у 2 тамах. Т. 1". Мн., 2002)
9. "Repressed Belarusian literary men. Encyclopaedic dictionary in two volumes. Volume II". Minsk, 2002 ("Рэпрэсаваныя беларускія літаратары. Энцыклапедычны даведнік у 2 тамах. Т. 2". Мн., 2002)
10. “Repressed literary men, scientists, educators, public and cultural figures of Belarus, 1794-1991. Encyclopaedic dictionary in 10 volumes (15 books). Volume I". Smolensk, 2003 ("Рэпрэсаваныя літаратары, навукоўцы, работнікі асветы, грамадскія і культурныя дзеячы Беларусі. Энцыклапедычны даведнік у 10 тамах (15 кнігах). Т. 1". Смаленск, 2003)
11. “Repressed literary men, scientists, educators, public and cultural figures of Belarus, 1794-1991. Encyclopaedic dictionary in 10 volumes (15 books). Volume II". Smolensk, 2003 ("Рэпрэсаваныя літаратары, навукоўцы, работнікі асветы, грамадскія і культурныя дзеячы Беларусі. Энцыклапедычны даведнік у 10 тамах (15 кнігах). Т. 2". Смаленск, 2003)
12. “Repressed literary men, scientists, educators, public and cultural figures of Belarus, 1794-1991. Encyclopaedic dictionary in 10 volumes (15 books). Volume III, Book 1". Minsk, 2004 ("Рэпрэсаваныя літаратары, навукоўцы, работнікі асветы, грамадскія і культурныя дзеячы Беларусі, 1794-1991. Энцыклапедычны даведнік у 10 тамах (15 кнігах). Т. 3. Кніга 1". Мн., 2004)
13. “Repressed literary men, scientists, educators, public and cultural figures of Belarus, 1794-1991. Encyclopaedic dictionary in 10 volumes (15 books). Volume III, Book 2". Minsk, 2005 ("Рэпрэсаваныя літаратары, навукоўцы, работнікі асветы, грамадскія і культурныя дзеячы Беларусі, 1794-1991. Энцыклапедычны даведнік у 10 тамах (15 кнігах). Т. 3. Кніга 2". Мн., 2005)
14. "Just one night." Minsk, 2006 ("Толькі адна ноч (ратапрынтнае выданне)". Мн., 2006)
15. "Repressed Orthodox clergymen and priests of Belarus, 1917-1967. Encyclopaedic dictionary in two volumes. Volume I". Minsk, 2007 ("Рэпрэсаваныя праваслаўныя свяшчэнна- і царкоўнаслужыцелі Беларусі, 1917—1967. Энцыклапедычны даведнік у 2-х тамах. Т. 1". Мн., 2007)
16. "Repressed Orthodox clergymen and priests of Belarus, 1917-1967. Encyclopaedic dictionary in two volumes. Volume II". Minsk, 2007 ("Рэпрэсаваныя праваслаўныя свяшчэнна- і царкоўнаслужыцелі Беларусі, 1917—1967. Энцыклапедычны даведнік у 2-х тамах. Т. 2". Мн., 2007)
17. "Victims and executioners. A reference book". Minsk, 2007 ("Ахвяры і карнікі. Даведнік". Мн., 2007)
18. “Repressed literary men, scientists, educators, public and cultural figures of Belarus. Encyclopaedic dictionary in 10 volumes (15 books). Volume 4, Book 1. Repressed teachers of Belarus. 1917—1954". Minsk, 2007. ("Рэпрэсаваныя літаратары, навукоўцы, работнікі асветы, грамадскія і культурныя дзеячы Беларусі. Энцыклапедычны даведнік у 10 тамах (15 кнігах). Т. 4. Кніга 1. Рэпрэсаваныя настаўнікі Беларусі. 1917—1954". Мн., 2007)
19. “Repressed literary men, scientists, educators, public and cultural figures of Belarus. Encyclopaedic dictionary in 10 volumes (15 books). Volume 4, Book 2. Repressed teachers of Belarus. 1917—1954". Minsk, 2007. ("Рэпрэсаваныя літаратары, навукоўцы, работнікі асветы, грамадскія і культурныя дзеячы Беларусі. Энцыклапедычны даведнік у 10 тамах (15 кнігах). Т. 4. Кніга 2. Рэпрэсаваныя настаўнікі Беларусі. 1917—1954". Мн., 2007)
20. "Recusants - III. Third attempt. A novel in short stories". Minsk, 2007 ("Непамяркоўныя — ІІІ. Трэцяя спроба. Раман у апавяданнях". Мн., 2007)
21. "Diary of a dead contrabandist. Short stories". Minsk, 2008 ("Запісы забітага кантрабандыста. Апавяданні". Мн., 2008)
22. "Recusants. Short stories (Authorised translation to the Russian language)". Minsk, 2008 ("Непримиримые. Рассказы. Авторизованный перевод с белорусского языка". Мн., 2008)
23. "They didn't know... Short stories and records". Minsk, 2009 ("Яны не ведалі…. Апавяданні, запісы. Мн., 2009")
24. "Notebook of a dead contrabandist. Short stories and records". Minsk, 2009 ("Сшытак забітага кантрабандыста. Апавяданні, запісы. Мн., 2009")
25. "Short stories: criminal; about love; from a dead contrabandist. (Authorised translation to the Russian language)". Minsk, 2009 ("Рассказы: криминальные; о любви; убитого контрабандиста. Авторизованный перевод с белорусского языка". Мн., 2009)
26. "Repressed catholic clergymen of Belarus: spiritual, consecrated and secular figures. 1917 - 1964. Encyclopaedic dictionary". Minsk, 2009 ("Рэпрэсаваныя каталіцкія вернікі Беларусі: духоўныя, кансэкраваныя і свецкія асобы. 1917—1964. Энцыклапедычны даведнік". Мн., 2009)
27. “Repressed literary men, scientists, educators, public and cultural figures of Belarus. Encyclopaedic dictionary in 10 volumes (15 books). Volume V". Repressed medical and veterinary specialists of Belarus. 1917—1960". Minsk, 2010 ("Рэпрэсаваныя літаратары, навукоўцы, работнікі асветы, грамадскія і культурныя дзеячы Беларусі. Энцыклапедычны даведнік у 10 тамах (15 кнігах). Т. 5. Рэпрэсаваныя медыцынскія і ветэрынарныя работнікі Беларусі. 1917—1960". Мн., 2010)
28. "Recusants. The second edition, extended and thoroughly revised". Minsk, 2012 ("Непамяркоўныя. 2-е выданне, дапоўненае і перапрацаванае". Мн., 2012)
29. "Minsk Main Street: history. 1880-1940 / Book I". Minsk, 2013 ("Галоўная вуліца Мінска. 1880—1940. Кніга 1.") Мн., 2013 (2012))
30. "Minsk Main Street: history. 1880-1940 / Book II". Minsk, 2014 ("Галоўная вуліца Мінска. 1880—1940. Кніга 2.") Мн., 2014)

Ready for publishing (2009, 2013):

- "Biographies. (Extended life stories of repressed writers of Belarus, hundreds of photo-pictures, most of which have never been published before". ("Біяграфіі (разгорнутыя жыццяпісы рэпрэсаваных пісьменнікаў Беларусі, сотні фотаздымкаў, большая частка з якіх не друкавалася)")
- "The very Nizhny Taghil. A script for a full-length criminal thriller film". ("Самы Ніжні Тагіл. Сцэнар дэтэктыўна-прыгодніцкага поўнаметражнага фільма")

In preparation (2010—2020):

- “Repressed literary men, scientists, educators, public and cultural figures of Belarus, 1794-1991. Encyclopaedic dictionary in 10 volumes (15 books). Volume III, Book 3". ("Рэпрэсаваныя літаратары, навукоўцы, работнікі асветы, грамадскія і культурныя дзеячы Беларусі. Энцыклапедычны даведнік у 10 тамах (15 кнігах). Т. 3. Кніга 3")
- “Repressed literary men, scientists, educators, public and cultural figures of Belarus. Encyclopaedic dictionary in 10 volumes (15 books). Volume VI. Repressed office workers". ("Рэпрэсаваныя літаратары, навукоўцы, работнікі асветы, грамадскія і культурныя дзеячы Беларусі. Энцыклапедычны даведнік у 10 тамах (15 кнігах). Т. 6. Рэпрэсаваныя службоўцы")
- “Repressed literary men, scientists, educators, public and cultural figures of Belarus. Encyclopaedic dictionary in 10 volumes (15 books). Volume VII. Repressed office workers". ("Рэпрэсаваныя літаратары, навукоўцы, работнікі асветы, грамадскія і культурныя дзеячы Беларусі. Энцыклапедычны даведнік у 10 тамах (15 кнігах). Т. 7. Рэпрэсаваныя службоўцы")
- “Repressed literary men, scientists, educators, public and cultural figures of Belarus. Encyclopaedic dictionary in 10 volumes (15 books). Volume VIII. Wives of `enemies of people'". ("Рэпрэсаваныя літаратары, навукоўцы, работнікі асветы, грамадскія і культурныя дзеячы Беларусі. Энцыклапедычны даведнік у 10 тамах (15 кнігах). Т. 8. Жонкі “ворагаў народа”)
- “Repressed literary men, scientists, educators, public and cultural figures of Belarus. Encyclopaedic dictionary in 10 volumes (15 books). Volume IX. Belarusians in Russian concentration camps". ("Рэпрэсаваныя літаратары, навукоўцы, работнікі асветы, грамадскія і культурныя дзеячы Беларусі. Энцыклапедычны даведнік у 10 тамах (15 кнігах). Т. 9. Беларусы ў расійскіх канцэнтрацыйных лагерах")
- “Repressed literary men, scientists, educators, public and cultural figures of Belarus. Encyclopaedic dictionary in 10 volumes (15 books). Volume X. Addendum, common name and geographical references". ("Рэпрэсаваныя літаратары, навукоўцы, работнікі асветы, грамадскія і культурныя дзеячы Беларусі. Энцыклапедычны даведнік у 10 тамах (15 кнігах). Т. 10. Дадатак, агульныя імянны і геаграфічны паказальнікі")
- "Letts, Lithuanians, Germans and Estonians repressed on the territory of Belarus. A reference book". ("Рэпрэсаваныя на тэрыторыі Беларусі латышы, літоўцы, немцы, эстонцы. Даведнік")
- "Repressed landowners of Belarus. Encyclopaedic dictionary". ("Рэпрэсаваныя землеўласнікі Беларусі. Энцыклапедычны даведнік")
- "Victims and executioners - II". ("Ахвяры і карнікі — ІІ")

== See also ==
- Soviet repressions in Belarus
