= Halichy rural council =

Halichy rural council (Belarusian: Галіцкі сельсавет, Russian: Галичский сельсовет) is a former lower-level subdivision (selsoviet) of Klimavichy district, Mogilev region, Belarus. Its capital was the village of Halichy. According to the 2019 Belarus Census, its population was 535.

In 2023 it was abolished and its territory distributed between Rodnya rural council and Milaslavichy rural council.
