= 132nd Rifle Division =

132nd Rifle Division (August 16, 1939 – June 1946)
- Active: 1939–1946
- Country: Soviet Union
- Branch: Red Army (1939-46)
- Type: Infantry
- Size: Division
- Engagements: Operation Barbarossa; Siege of Mogilev; Roslavl–Novozybkov offensive Yelets Operation; Battle of Voronezh (1942); Voronezh–Kastornoye offensive Operation Star; Battle of Kursk; Operation Kutuzov; Battle of the Dnieper; Battle of Kiev (1943); Kalinkovichi-Mozyr offensive Ozarichi-Ptich offensive Parichi-Bobruisk offensive Operation Bagration; Lublin–Brest offensive Vistula–Oder offensive East Pomeranian offensive Battle of Berlin
- Decorations: Order of the Red Banner (2); Order of Suvorov
- Battle honours: Bakhmach; Warsaw

Commanders
- Notable commanders: Maj. Gen. Sergei Semyonovich Biryuzov; Col. Andrei Avksentevich Mishchenko; Maj. Gen. Timofei Kalinovich Shkrylyov; Col. Pyotr Savvich Gavilevskii; Col. Yakov Gerasimovich Tsvintarnyi; Col. Nikolai Vasilevich Smirnov; Col. Ivan Vladimirovich Solovyov

The 132nd Rifle Division was first formed as an infantry division of the Red Army in August 1939 in the Kharkov Military District, based on the shtat (table of organization and equipment) of the following month. It remained based in eastern Ukraine through the prewar period, but with the start of the German invasion, it was quickly built up to wartime strength then moved by rail to eastern Belarus where it was initially assigned to Western Front's 21st Army, but was soon reassigned to 13th Army. It was involved in the fighting for Mogilev both before and after that Army was made part of the new Central Front. As the Army was forced back to the Sozh, and later the Desna River, the division was twice forced to escape from encirclement at considerable cost, finally being moved to the rear for rebuilding after the 13th was reassigned to the new Bryansk Front. This rebuilding process was truncated when the division was flung into counterattacks in a fruitless effort to retake Novhorod-Siverskyi as 2nd Panzer Group began its southward thrust into the rear of Southwestern Front. The 132nd managed to hold its ground into the early days of Operation Typhoon in October, when it again found itself encircled. Enough of the division escaped that it avoided disbandment, and served through the winter in the Yelets area, slowly rebuilding.

In the opening stages of the German summer offensive in 1942 the division was pushed aside, after which it hung over the flank of 2nd Army until January 1943 when it played a leading role in 13th Army's encirclement operation toward Kastornoye. Following this success it continued to advance to the northwest, assisting in the liberation of Kursk, before the offensive bogged down in March. By the time of the Kursk offensive in July it had been reassigned to 70th Army in Central Front, and held an important sector on the right flank of German 9th Army's southward push. In the first two days of fighting it managed to defend the Army's right flank against concerted attacks by infantry and armor, after which the main battle shifted to other sectors. It took part in the initial phase of Operation Kutuzov, but in August it was removed to the Reserve of the Supreme High Command for rebuilding. When it returned to the front, now as part of Central Front's 60th Army, it soon won a battle honor during the advance through eastern Ukraine, and then the Order of the Red Banner for its services at Kursk. It was one of the first rifle divisions to reach the Dniepr River and forced a crossing on September 25. In October it was transferred with its Army to 1st Ukrainian Front and it took part in the battles north of Kyiv that led to its capture on November 6. Following this it joined in the pursuit of the defeated forces but by mid-month was facing off against panzer counterattacks in the Zhytomyr area which were slowly beaten back at considerable cost. It then re-entered the Reserve of the Supreme High Command, returning to eastern Belarus as part of Belorussian Front's 65th Army. During the winter of 1944 it took part in a series of campaigns in that region that gradually gained ground through the frozen Pripet Marshes without managing a decisive breakthrough, although it did win the Order of Suvorov. In the spring the 132nd was moved to the same Front's 47th Army, where it would remain for the duration. When the summer offensive began in this sector in July the division was soon awarded its unusual second Order of the Red Banner after the fall of Kovel. Following this it advanced to the Vistula River and spent the fall and winter east of Warsaw.

In the opening days of the January 1945 offensive the division was given its second battle honor for its part in taking the Polish capital, and then continued to advance toward Pomerania. After reaching the Baltic coast near Altdamm in March it regrouped with its Army along the Oder River for the final campaign on Berlin. During the April offensive the 132nd took part in the encirclement of the German capital from the north before advancing to the Elbe River in the first days of May. Postwar it formed part of the Group of Soviet Forces in Germany until June 1946 when it was disbanded.

== Formation ==
The 132nd Rifle Division was formed on August 16, 1939, at Poltava in the Kharkov Military District, based on the 88th Rifle Regiment from the 30th Rifle Division. Kombrig Sergei Semyonovich Biryuzov was assigned to command on September 15; he had previously served as chief of staff of the 30th Division, and he would have his rank changed to major general on June 4, 1940. At the time of the German invasion it was part of the 67th Rifle Corps (with the 102nd and 151st Rifle Divisions) in the Moscow Military District. Its order of battle was as follows:

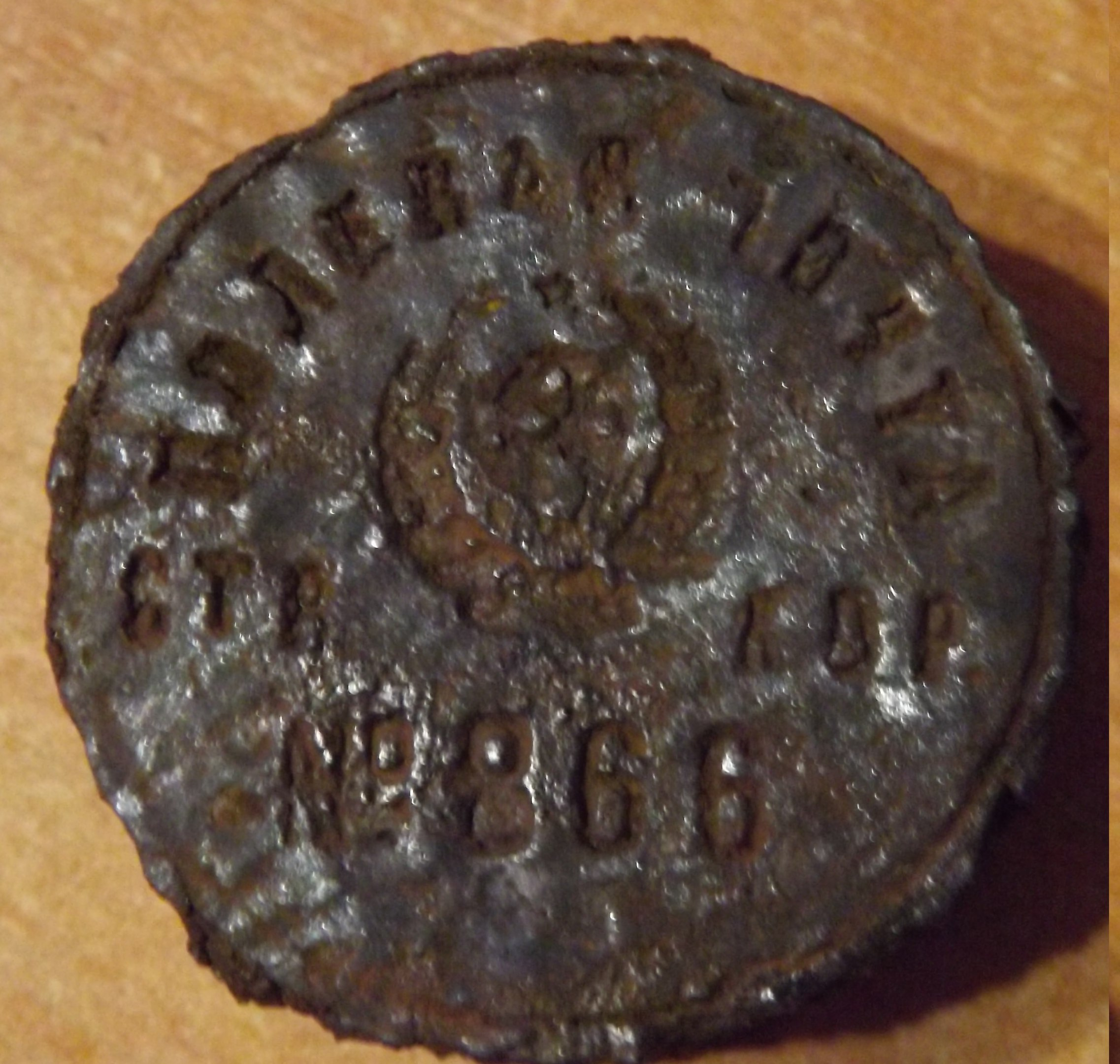
Stamp used by 866th Field Postal Station

- 498th Rifle Regiment
- 605th Rifle Regiment
- 712th Rifle Regiment
- 425th Artillery Regiment
- 23rd Antitank Battalion (later 214th)
- 204th Antiaircraft Battery (later 340th Antiaircraft Battalion, until April 20, 1943)
- 190th Reconnaissance Company
- 237th Sapper Battalion
- 296th Signal Battalion (later 20th Signal Company)
- 223rd Medical/Sanitation Battalion
- 4th Chemical Defense (Anti-gas) Company (later 58th)
- 42nd Motor Transport Company (later 149th Motor Transport Battalion)
- 333rd Field Bakery
- 241st Divisional Veterinary Hospital (later 192nd)
- 866th Field Postal Station (later 886th)
- 240th Field Office of the State Bank

The division was still located in the Poltava region. At 18:00 hours on June 22 Biryuzov received orders from the 67th Corps commander, Kombrig F. F. Zhmachenko, to begin loading for transport to the front. On July 1 it was concentrating with the rest of its Corps north of Gomel, coming under command of 21st Army in the Group of Reserve Armies. It became officially active the next day as part of Western Front.

=== Battles in Belarus ===
By July 7 the 132nd and 151st Divisions had taken up a line from Rechytsa to Gomel to Dobrush to Loyew. At this time 21st Army was under command of Lt. Gen. V. F. Gerasimenko and Western Front, as well as Western Direction, was in the hands of Marshal S. K. Timoshenko. On July 10 the 132nd was reassigned to 13th Army, joining the 137th and 160th Rifle Divisions in 20th Rifle Corps. Two days later the Army was penetrated to a depth of 20 km by 2nd Panzer Group. On July 14 Timoshenko, after sending a long and accurate assessment of the state of his command to the STAVKA, also issued orders for extensive counterattacks which were beyond the capability of his largely depleted forces. 13th Army was to:

... liquidate the enemy penetration in the Staryi Bykhov region on 16 July... and firmly hold on to your positions along the Dnepr River. I am assigning the decisive attack to 13th Army's units as the most important mission and a matter of honor.

In the event, Timoshenko would moderate his demands over the coming days, as events unfolded elsewhere. In the evening of July 16 the 132nd was reported as being at Kopani and Usushek, 32 km-40 km southeast of Mogilev.

=== Siege of Mogilev ===
At this point the most serious difficulty facing the commander of 2nd Panzer Group, Gen. H. Guderian, was the upcoming battle for the city of Mogilev. The 3rd Panzer and 10th Motorized Divisions of XXIV Panzer Corps were containing the forces of 13th Army in this strongpoint until infantry of 2nd Army could come up to free them for a further advance to the east. This would not happen until July 17. In addition, the supply lines of the panzers were being disrupted by withdrawing elements of 13th Army. The city was loosely encircled by the end of July 15, although the commander of the 13th, Lt. Gen. V. F. Gerasimenko, and his staff had managed to pull back to the Sozh River. The defenders numbered some 100,000 men, largely of the 61st Rifle Corps and 20th Corps, including most of the 132nd. However, any hope of defending this river line would depend on most of these 100,000 breaking out to the east. Eventually 30,000 were left in the city, including a cadre of the 132nd, which held out until July 26.

At dawn on July 21 Gerasimenko reported that the 137th had concentrated in a forest to the north of Ostrovy, and that the 132nd had followed the previous morning, but its current whereabouts were unknown. In fact, 13th Army's main forces had been scattered in the retreat to the Sozh, and were running a gauntlet of fire from detachments of XXIV Panzer.

Late on July 21, Timoshenko issued orders to his Front, which included that 13th Army was to "capture Propoisk and Krichev [on the Sozh River 65km and 90km southeast and south of Mogilev, respectively]." Concurrent with this, Timoshenko issued an order which read, in part:

Withdraw the remnants of 7th and 17th [Mechanized Corps] and 24th, 137th, 132nd, 148th, and 160th RDs to the Sukhinichi region, and form two [100-series] tank divisions from the mechanized corps. Entrust 4th Army's headquarters with the task of forming the formations [divisions] indicated above.

On July 23 the STAVKA removed 13th and 21st Armies from Western Front to create a new Central Front. During this reorganization the 132nd was assigned to the 28th Rifle Corps, which also contained the 55th Rifle Division. The next day, Timoshenko reported optimistically that 13th Army was planning to break through to the Mogilev garrison in a joint attack with 21st and 4th Armies. In a further report early on July 27 he stated:

13th Army - since 61st RC's vigorous defense of Mogilev is tying down as many as 5 enemy infantry divisions, 13th Army was ordered to defend Mogilev at all cost, and 13th Army and the Central Front received orders to attack toward Mogilev... However, when the commander of 13th Army failed to urge Bakunin, the commander of 61st RC, to stand fast, the latter "rudely violated his [previous] orders" and illegally abandoned Mogilev... The Western Front immediately countered Bakunin's order, replaced Bakunin with Colonel Voevodin, who steadfastly defended Mogilev, and turned Bakunin over to a military tribunal.

By this time the divisions of 13th Army were especially depleted. Timoshenko belatedly realized by July 31 that his counteroffensive was no longer feasible.

Lt. Gen. K. D. Golubev had taken over 13th Army on July 26. Central Front was proving unable to halt Guderian's push toward Gomel, which caught Golubev unprepared, and soon sent his forces desperately trying to escape encirclement in a dash to the south. On August 9 the 7th Panzer Division wheeled to the west and captured Klimavichy, effectively encircling the 132nd, 137th, and 160th Divisions, plus part of 4th Airborne Corps, at Krychaw. 7th Infantry Division, with part of 10th Motorized, set about liquidating the encircled grouping while 4th Panzer Division put up a defensive screen to the north near the town of Kommunary to block any rescue effort by Golubev. By August 12 this battle was over, with many Soviet casualties, although sufficient men escaped that the three divisions could go on fighting.

=== Battles on the Desna ===
As Guderian pressed south with his forces a gap was formed between Central and Reserve Fronts. The STAVKA responded on August 14 by forming Bryansk Front under command of Lt. Gen. A. I. Yeryomenko. The new Front had just two armies, the 13th and 50th, with the 132nd still part of the former. The Front was also expected to take part in Timoshenko's new counteroffensive against Army Group Center. 13th Army was in tatters after being defeated south of the Sozh and was withdrawing to the east with little prospect of making an offensive contribution. The strength of the 132nd on August 15 was reported as being the equivalent of 2-3 rifle battalions. The same day Guderian was ordered to continue moving south with XXIV Panzer Corps over his objections, and on August 16 4th Panzer ran into stiff resistance from 13th Army at the Besed River, forcing the commitment of 10th Motorized. By August 18, 2nd Panzer Group had forced a salient 115 km wide and 120 km deep between Bryansk and Central Fronts.

By August 19 the stage was set for an encounter battle Guderian's forces and Bryansk Front. XXXXVII Panzer Corps led with its reconnaissance elements in the direction of Bryansk and Trubchevsk. General Golubev deployed only his most combat-effective units to fortify the routes to those two places in order to provide a base for future counterattacks; this effort began on the afternoon of August 21 despite a lack of information on German positions and intentions. The defensive line was to be some 70 km long on either side of Pogar, tying in with 50th Army to the north. In his Order No. 056 of that date the 132nd, not being combat effective, was ordered to "rest and refit in the Negino region [48km south-southeast of Trubchevsk]" By day's end the two Armies were mostly in sound defenses along the Desna River.

Over the next two days the 17th Panzer Division continued a slow advance on Pochep, threatening to break the Desna line. At 20:00 hours on August 23 Yeryomenko tasked 13th Army with the defense of that place. At midnight on August 26 Maj. Gen. A. M. Gorodnianskii took over this command. By this time Hitler had finalized his decision to encircle Southwestern Front in and east of Kyiv, which would require Guderian's forces to drive due south and 4th Army would take over their sector as far south as Pochep. 17th Panzer was to advance through that place and Trubchevsk to guard the left flank of the advance. Pochep had fallen on the afternoon of August 25, while 3rd Panzer was moving on Novhorod-Siverskyi, where two bridges spanned the Desna. 10th Motorized captured Avdeyevka the following afternoon, and at 20:00 hours that evening Yeryomenko issued an operational summary while also stating that 13th Army would attack on August 27 to destroy all German forces west of Novhorod-Siverskyi. As part of this the 132nd was to "move to defend the Och'kino [25km north of Novhorod-Siverskyi] and Novhorod-Siverskyi sector along the Desna River." Biryuzov was instructed to have his headquarters at Kilchitsii, 22 km north-northeast of Novhorod-Siverskyi.

=== Roslavl-Novozybkov Offensive ===
13th Army reported in the morning of August 29 that the 132nd was "fighting along the Birin and Proklopovka line [10km-15km north-northeast of Novhorod-Siverskyi] with enemy motorized infantry and tanks from 3rd PzD." By this time 2nd Panzer Group was maneuvering for jumping off positions for its drive south. The STAVKA, still not grasping the significance of Guderian's moves, demanded that Yeryomenko join in on a general counteroffensive by Western and Reserve Fronts set for August 30 and September 1. In his first orders only 13th Army would be involved, attacking toward Starodub, but on the morning of August 30 the STAVKA complicated the situation by ordering all of his Front take part. Gorodnianskii was now to commit five divisions with tank support toward Zheleznyi Most and Semyonovka, still with the objective of "destroying the enemy's Novhorod-Siverskyi grouping", but now with the assistance of the newly re-formed 3rd Army. Meanwhile, a 20 km-wide gap separated Bryansk Front and Central Front's 21st Army.

During September 1 the 132nd was involved in heavy combat with "approaching enemy reserves" near Birin, largely holding its ground, and reported causing 281 casualties while also shooting down four planes with its antiaircraft guns. However, the 1st Battalion of 498th Rifle Regiment was encircled by nine German tanks in woods west of Podgornyi and cut off, later assembling only 100 men. One tank was destroyed. The offensive finally got underway on September 2. The division, supported by the 420th Cannon Artillery Regiment, was to attack toward Novhorod-Siverskyi to reach Ostroushki and Pogrebki along the Desna, as part of the Army's shock group with the 143rd Rifle, 50th Tank, and 52nd Cavalry Divisions. The division faced elements of 17th Panzer and all of the 29th Motorized Division south of Trubchevsk. It remained dug in on a line from southeast of Birin to a grove south of Prokopovka. The entire effort by 13th Army failed as XXIV Panzer Corps pushed south into the flank of the new 40th Army. The next day the 132nd officially went over to the defense.

Yeryomenko's report in the evening of September 5 stated that the division was continuing to improve its positions along the same line, while 22 men had been wounded. The next day, Biryuzov reported that during September 2–4 his soldiers had captured a truck, seven machine guns, six other automatic weapons, three 37mm guns, and several other trophies. On September 7 the Front returned to the attack and the 132nd, in cooperation with the 143rd's 800th Rifle Regiment, captured Prokopovka and gained other ground southwest of Birin. The STAVKA persisted in ordering attacks as late as September 12. On September 16 the 2nd and 1st Panzer Groups officially linked up south of Lokhvytsia, and Southwestern Front was encircled.

== Operation Typhoon ==
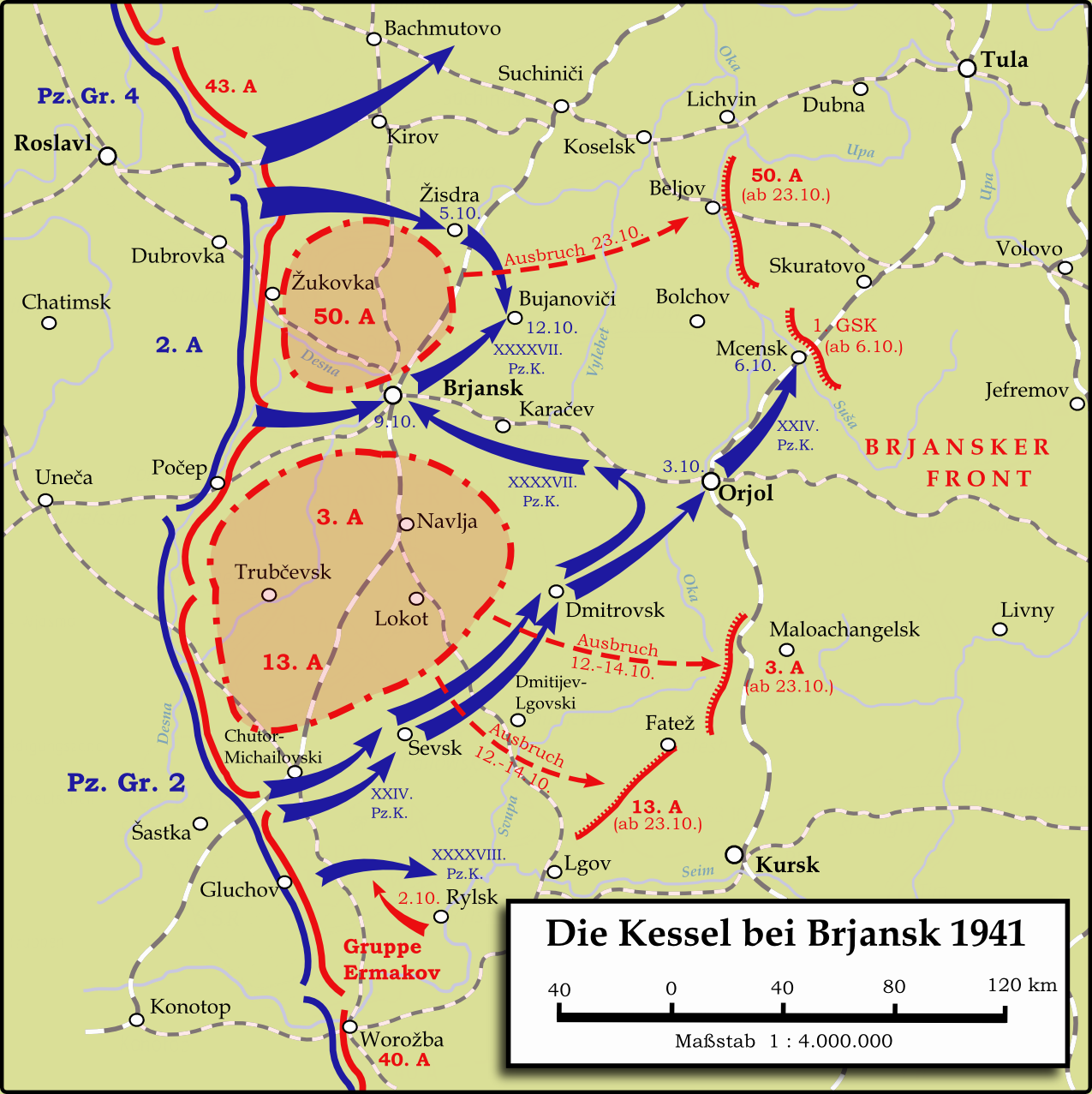
Bryansk encirclement, October 1941. Note position of 13th Army.

Once the Kyiv pocket was eliminated it was obvious that German attentions would again be directed at Moscow. As September continued Bryansk Front was deployed along a 345 km-wide sector, with a total of 25 rifle divisions, one tank and four cavalry divisions. Despite the STAVKA's order to go over to the defense around the 12th, Yeryomenko continued to order attacks to win local objectives, and between September 11–20 lost some 18,750 personnel; he completely failed to appreciate that Guderian could quickly disengage from the battle in east Ukraine and redirect toward Moscow. Even in the last ten days of the month the left-flank units of 13th Army and the so-called Group Yermakov were being ordered to attack and retake Hlukhiv. Due to skillful use of German reserves these efforts were repeatedly defeated. Soviet intelligence pointed to the signs of an upcoming German offensive, but a further attack by the 143rd, 132nd, and 307th Rifle Divisions was set for 0630 hours on September 27. Yeryomenko finally acquiesced to the STAVKA and cancelled it, ordering Gorodnianskii to put 13th Army on a defensive posture, with reserves and second echelons. Only 48 hours remained until the opening of Operation Typhoon.

2nd Panzer Group struck on September 30 south of 13th Army, while 2nd Army attacked toward Bryansk on October 2, cutting between 3rd and 50th Armies. The panzers struck the boundary between Gorodnianskii and Group Yermakov, moving in the direction of Sevsk. The 498th Rifle Regiment attempted a counterattack, but had no success. On the other hand the limited attacks against the 132nd, 6th, 155th, and 307th Rifle Divisions also failed to do more than to pin them in place. It was not until October 2 that the overall situation became clear to the STAVKA, which sent orders to Yeryomenko via 13th Army headquarters, demanding a counterstrike the next morning. This was initially to involve four divisions, even though their current locations were not entirely known due to a steady breakdown in communications. In the afternoon of October 3 Gorodnianskii reported that German forces had taken Golubovka, Ulitsa, and Suzemki on his left flank while remaining inactive on his right. He now chose to regroup on his left for an attack toward Khutor-Mikhailovskii in order to get into the German rear. This effort, by three divisions, would be supported by just six tanks. The German forces were well prepared for such a measure, and also dominated the air. The counterstroke failed completely, at the cost of heavy losses in personnel and heavy weapons On the same day the 4th Panzer Division broke into Oryol from the march after a 200 km advance in four days.

On October 4 the XXXXVII Motorized took Lokot, 45 km north of Sevsk, before pivoting toward Karachev and Bryansk. 13th Army was now deeply enveloped from the east, and the 132nd had some 1,500 men remaining. At 23:40 hours Gorodnianskii was ordered to take up a defensive stance by preparing a second defensive belt, but at 11:45 on October 6 was tasked with holding his current lines while also attacking toward Suzemka and Seredina-Buda with his main forces, largely the 6th and 143rd, and then on to Sevsk in conjunction with 3rd Army and Group Yermakov, a clear impossibility. By October 8 the 13th Army had taken large losses and overnight regrouped to clear an escape path. The main attack would be led by the 143rd and 132nd, plus the 141st Tank Brigade. General Biryuzov deliberately broadcast a false order in the clear over the radio, stating that the attack should be made toward Uralovo and Khilchichi, and this proved effective.

=== Breakout from encirclement ===
Lt. Gen. M. A. Kozlov, who served as a member of 13th Army's military council for most of the war, later related how the breakout took place:

8 October. As the army was preparing to break out, an order arrived from Lieutenant-General M. P. Petrov [commander of 50th Army, who was killed in action two days later] about escaping the encirclement in the Dmitrovsk–Orvolskii–Kromy–Zmievka direction...
Early on the morning of 9 October, the breakthrough detachments of the 132nd and 143rd Rifle Divisions with attached tanks of the 141st Tank Brigade went on the attack in the Negino area. Simultaneously, all the tractors parked in this area on the edge of the woods started up their engines and imitated the movement of tanks with their noise. The artillery battalion poured fire on the enemy positions. The attack was unexpected and successful. In Negino we destroyed up to a regiment of infantry, captured the regiment's headquarters, and smashed 15 antitank guns. The 132nd and 143rd Rifle Divisions together with the 13th Army headquarters' forward echelon passed through Negino.

Within three hours German reserves managed to close this gap, and 6th Division was forced to punch a new hole for itself, the Army's second echelon, and Gorodnianskii's reserves. The next day the 132nd retook the Khinelskii timber industrial complex near the Hlukhiv–Sevsk highway, which was serving as a major German supply hub, inflicting losses on a German motorized column that had stopped for a rest in the villages of Poznyatovka and Veselaya Kalina. During this fighting Biryuzov was wounded, but was successfully evacuated and hospitalized by October 15, at which point his chief of staff, Col. Andrei Avksentevich Mishchenko, took command.

Despite this success, the breakout force was soon surrounded again by elements of XXXV Army Corps and XXXXVIII Motorized Corps. 13th Army received fuel by airdrop, but in insufficient quantities. On October 17 the Army's military council decided to destroy the immobile motor transport and other immovable materiel. All remaining artillery ammunition was fired off, and the guns themselves were permanently disabled. Units of the Army managed to escape by crossing a bridge over the Svapa River owing to an attack from outside by an operational group organized by Yeryomenko. During this passage they destroyed numbers of German vehicles that had bogged down in mud. Approximately 10,000 reached friendly territory on October 18 with their small arms and 11 artillery pieces. By October 22, 13th Army was holding a defensive line of some 45 km northwest of Kursk.

=== Counteroffensive and Case Blue ===
During November the division, still grossly below strength, was forced back by the still-advancing German forces in the Livny area, but with the start of the December counteroffensive 13th Army struck back against German 2nd Army, retaking Livny and Yelets before the front settled down again. On December 18 Bryansk Front, which had been disbanded after Typhoon, was recreated with the 3rd, 13th, and 61st Armies under command of Col. Gen. Ya. T. Cherevichenko. During January 1942 he led his forces forward to the line Belyov–Mtsensk–Verkhovye.

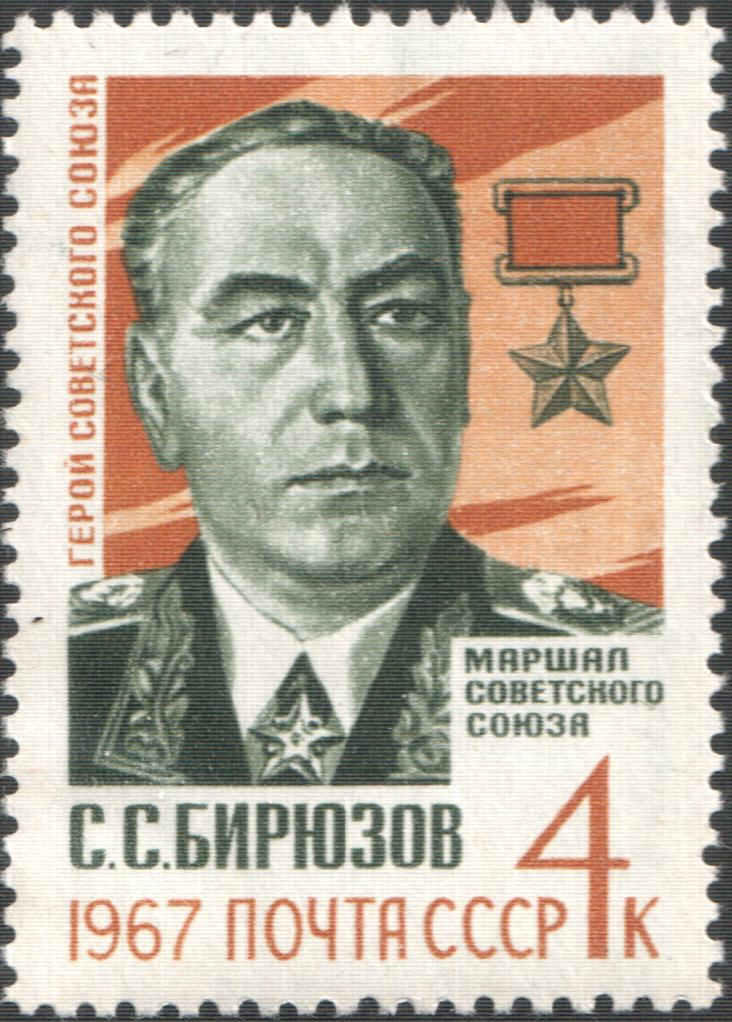
Soviet Union 1967 postage stamp featuring Marshal Biryuzov

Maj. Gen. N. P. Pukhov took command of the Army on January 25. General Biryuzov returned to the 132nd on February 17, received the Order of Lenin on March 27, but left again on April 17, soon becoming the chief of staff of 48th Army. He served in several other Army and Front chief of staff positions before ending the war in command of 37th Army with the rank of colonel general. On March 11, 1955, he would be made a Marshal of the Soviet Union before serving for several years as commander in chief of Air Defence Forces, becoming a Hero of the Soviet Union on February 1, 1958, and later briefly as commander in chief of Strategic Missile Forces and chief of the General Staff in 1962–64. He was in the latter position when he was killed in an air crash near Belgrade on September 19. From April 18 to June 12, 1942, the division was commanded by Maj. Mikhail Arkadevich Dudkin, who was replaced by Col. Timofei Kalinovich Shkrylyov, who had previously led the 321st Rifle Regiment of the 15th Rifle Division. He would be promoted to the rank of major general on February 14, 1943.

As it rebuilt the division adopted the shtat of March 18, 1942, with each rifle regiment organized as follows:

- three rifle battalions, each with three rifle and one heavy machine gun company;
- one mortar battalion, with one each of 50mm, 82mm, and 120mm batteries;
- one antitank rifle company;
- one antitank gun battery with four 45mm guns;
- one regimental gun battery with four 76mm howitzers.

At the start of Case Blue 40th Army formed the left wing of the Front, facing the spearheads of 4th Panzer Army with some 700 tanks. 40th Army had roughly 250 tanks on strength. If 40th Army failed to fend off this attack the Front's center would be in danger. 13th Army now sat astride the Sosna River west of Livny with four rifle divisions in first echelon, the 143rd and 15th south of the river, and the 148th and 132nd north of it; the 307th was in second echelon with the 109th Rifle Brigade. Pukhov had about 210 tanks available, including 1st Tank Corps. The offensive began on June 28 with two panzer corps advancing in tandem along three routes, tearing large gaps in the defenses of 40th and 21st Armies. 11th Panzer Division passed the Tim River and pushed ahead 10 km, breaking the line of the 15th Division. Otherwise, 13th Army was largely spared as the German force struck toward the east. The division saw little action over the following months.

== Voronezh–Kastornoye Offensive ==
By mid-January 1943 it was clear that a massive victory was about to be won at Stalingrad, and the STAVKA set about planning to expand this success on other fronts. By January 20 Bryansk Front, now under command of Lt. Gen. M. A. Reyter, and consisting of 3rd, 13th, and 48th Armies, plus 15th Air Army, was on a line from Bolshye Golubochki to Novosil to Gremyachaya to Kozinka. 13th Army, now with seven rifle divisions, including the rebuilt 132nd, formed the Front's left wing, on a 100 km-wide zone from Sidorovka to Kozinka. It had been defending along this line since the previous July, hanging over the Axis forces in the area of Voronezh–Kastornoye.

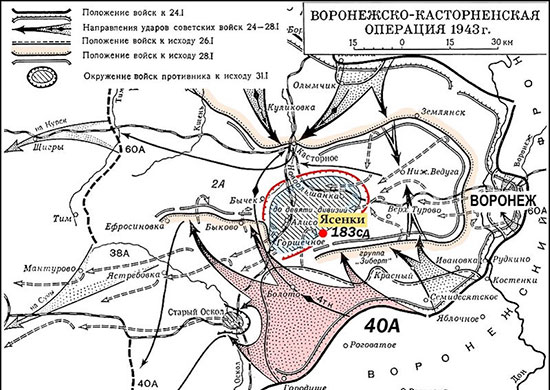
Voronezh–Kastornoye Offensive. 13th Army attacked from the north.

Bryansk Front's offensive toward Kastornoye was set for January 26. This joint operation with Voronezh Front targeted the German 2nd and Hungarian 2nd Armies. 13th Army was to break through along an 18 km-wide sector between the Kshen and Olym rivers with a shock group of all seven rifle divisions. The 132nd was in first echelon with the 307th, 148th, and 8th Rifle Divisions. The 132nd, operating in the group's center, was reinforced with three regiments of artillery/mortars. There were three divisions in second echelon, as well as a mobile group consisting of the 129th Tank Brigade, two aerosan battalions, plus a mortar and an antitank regiment. Once a breakthrough was made and the mobile group was committed the 132nd, 8th, and 307th were to push on to Kastornoye to encircle German 2nd Army in cooperation with 40th Army. The second echelon divisions (280th, 221st, and 81st) were, upon the arrival of the first echelon divisions in the area Volochik–Nizhne-Bolshoe–Vysshee-Bolshoe, to develop, in conjunction with the 148th, the offensive to the west and southwest to create an external encirclement front.

The offensive opened at 08:08 hours with a 65-minute artillery preparation, totaling 30 minutes of fire onslaughts and 35 minutes of aimed fire, altogether to a depth of 7–8 km. Air attacks began at 08:55. This preparation failed to suppress the defense completely and German fire from small arms and antitank guns from strongpoints particularly affected the shock group's flanks; the 148th attacked one such at Lomigory and was stopped with heavy losses. The remainder of the first echelon had penetrated the Axis front from Mishino to the Olym River by 1500 and the 132nd was fighting for the village of Aleksandrovka after an advance of some 8 km. The next day the strongpoints at Lomigory and Mishino continued to hold out. The 132nd and 307th made several head-on attacks at Zakharovka until ordered by Pukhov to bypass the place to threaten it with encirclement. This proved successful, and overnight on January 27/28 the German forces abandoned the place and retreated to the south. The 148th had a similar success at Lomigory and Mishino. Later in the day a pursuit took the attackers to a defense line from Volovchik to Volovo to Lipovchik. This covered the northern approaches to Kastornoye, and offered stubborn resistance. To take it, Pukhov decided to commit the 129th Tanks which, despite air attacks and deep snow, broke into Volovo, followed up by the 132nd and 307th to take the entire line. Meanwhile, the second echelon had advanced to the Turchanovo–Zamaraika–Kshen line in readiness to develop the attack to the west. By now the Army had penetrated to a depth of 20 km through a 25 km-wide gap and routed the main forces of the German 82nd Infantry Division, creating an immediate threat to Kastornoye from the north.

During the afternoon of January 28 the 132nd concentrated at Volovo, while the 15th did the same at Uritskoye. Pukhov had decided to task these with developing the offensive westward, which began overnight. Their immediate objective was to secure the boundary with 38th Army across a gap of some 30 km. When this was complete the main escape routes of Axis Voronezh-Kastornoye grouping had been cut, although the encirclement was not yet continuous. 4th Panzer Division was moving from the Oryol area but was just beginning to arrive near Kursk. The latter was the new objective of Bryansk Front's left wing forces.

=== Operation Star ===
During February 2 General Reyter's headquarters reported on the positions of the Front's forces, including the 132nd, which had captured Lavrovka and Nikitskoye in the process of attacking toward Shchigry, claiming to have "smashed" up to a battalion of infantry and destroyed 11 tanks. At noon the next day it was said to be back to fighting for Nikitskoye as it fended off counterattacks by infantry and armor while advancing toward Dubrovka with its left wing. Some 900 Axis troops were cut off in the Petrovka, Ivanovka, Pozhidaevka, and Krasnaya Polyana areas. On the same day a further report from this headquarters offered a critique:

The experience of the initial fighting shows that a number of commanders of units and subunits are violating the Infantry Combat Regulations. Some parts of the commanders are situating themselves in the general lines and, sometimes, even in front of their subunits. As a result, units have suffered unnecessary losses of command cadre... command and control is lost and the tempo of the offensive is decreased... Thus, in the 132nd Rifle Division, the division lost 167 mid-level command cadre alone during three days of combat operations. In addition, two deputy division commanders, the chief of staff of a regiment, a deputy regimental commander for political affairs, and a number of others were put out of action.

By the end of February 5 the division was in the Shchigry region after destroying up to a battalion of infantry and taking prisoners; it was being temporarily subordinated to 60th Army for its drive on Kursk. Given the pace of this advance the STAVKA decided on February 6 to shift the axis toward Oryol. This would have the effect of outflanking 2nd Panzer Army on its right and getting into its rear. As part of the orders to Reyter the 13th Army was to seize Bryansk and Karachev as part of a broader effort to encircle and destroy the German grouping around Oryol. Kursk fell to forces of 60th Army on February 8.

By February 9 the advance had created a gap between 2nd and 2nd Panzer Armies in the vicinity of Fatezh, and the 132nd, with the 280th, were moving in that direction. Of future importance, the 81st Division captured Ponyri, Ponyri Station, and Shirokoye Boloto. However, Reyter's report noted that German resistance was stiffening. This was more apparent by February 12 as German reserves were shifted from other sectors to plug a gap which threatened their entire strategic position. In addition, Red Army logistics were not keeping pace with the advance, especially given the winter weather; it was noted that the divisional exchange points of several rifle divisions were "lagging 60-70 kilometres behind their forward units." The next day Reyter noted the presence of the 18th and 20th Panzer Divisions, plus two "fresh" infantry divisions and other units, to his front, which he believed were being concentrated for a counterattack to retake Kursk.

At 10:00 hours on February 17 Reyter sent an update on his situation, which included:

5. The 13th Army continued its offensive toward the north during the night with its left wing units, with the mission of enveloping the Maloarkhangelsk grouping from the west...
The 132nd Rifle Division is continuing to fight for possession of Dmitriev-L'govskii.

On February 19 forces of Army Group South had begun the offensive that would become known as the Third Battle of Kharkov and before long the forces of Voronezh and Bryansk Fronts were scrambling to hold their gains of the past weeks. On the same date the division was reported as engaging the German 258th and 707th Infantry Divisions near Ostapovo and Polozovka.

==== Oryol Offensive ====
While Bryansk Front faced difficulties along its right flank the left flank forces continued to make gains. The 132nd, back under Pukhov's command and operating on 13th Army's left flank, reached the eastern approaches to Dmitriev-Lgovskii on February 23. This turned the right flank of 2nd Panzer Army, again separating it from 2nd Army to the south. On the same day, the right flank took Maloarkhangelsk, and on February 25 the recreated Central Front, under command of Col. Gen. K. K. Rokossovskii, struck into the gap, while the 132nd helped to guard its right flank. The division created a screen for 2nd Tank Army by driving the 707th back to the outskirts of Dmitriev-Lgovskii. The tanks bypassed the town, crossed the Svapa River, and began driving toward Sevsk. Late the next day Reyter reported that the positions of the 132nd would be turned over to the 194th Rifle Division of 65th Army, after which it would concentrate near Sukhochevo for a night march to join the mobile Group Novoselsky near Radogoshch.

Pukhov formed a shock group consisting of four divisions, not including the 132nd, which attacked at dawn on March 6, supported by two tank brigades. It was to attack to the north on both sides of the Maloarkhangelsk–Oryol road. This was accompanied by similar attacks by 48th and 3rd Armies. Two days of heavy fighting followed, during which 13th and 48th Armies made no progress at all, at heavy cost, while 3rd Army did little better. Meanwhile, the division lost a position to a counterattack on March 7 which it fought to regain the next day. A report on March 10 indicated that 13th Army had had only two days of rations on hand four days earlier, and the supply situation was still severely strained. This situation was somewhat remedied on March 11, but the 13th and 48th were confined to reconnaissance activities.

As the situation to the south deteriorated the STAVKA ordered a major regrouping of its forces. On March 12 Bryansk Front was disbanded and the 13th, 3rd, and 48th Armies were transferred to Central Front. German 2nd Army began a counteroffensive on March 14 against the overstretched 2nd Tank Army, while the STAVKA was removing part of Rokossovskii's forces to shore up the hard-pressed Voronezh Front. 13th Army remained stalled south of Trosna. In a flurry of orders a new Reserve Front, then a Kursk Front, and then an Oryol Front were all formed under Reyter's command, before Bryansk Front was reestablished on March 28. This command chaos brought any further Soviet offensive activity to a halt. Within weeks the entire front had effectively come to a standstill due to the spring rasputitsa.

== Battle of Kursk ==
Battle of Kursk. Note position of 70th Army.

Later in the month the 132nd was grouped with the 211th and 280th Divisions into the re-formed 28th Rifle Corps. In April the Corps was moved to 70th Army, which was under command of Lt. Gen. I. V. Galanin. When Operation Citadel began the Army was deployed on a 62 km-wide sector on the northwestern side of the salient. The division was in the second echelon with the 175th, 140th and 162nd Rifle Divisions.

German 9th Army was responsible for the southward German attack from the Oryol salient, and part of 70th Army was facing the westernmost part of the attack frontage near Gnilets. The offensive on this sector began at 09:30 hours on July 5 when the 7th Infantry and 20th Panzer Divisions, with air support, struck the right flank of the Army (280th in first echelon and 132nd in second). Despite heavy attacks, which were repeated several times, the 132nd was able to hold its defenses, and the 280th was equally successful. However, at the boundary of the 70th and 13th Armies the situation deteriorated as a large grouping of tanks and motorized infantry which had broken the front near Podolyan began spreading to the south and southwest, pushing back 13th Army's left flank. 15th Rifle Division had suffered particularly high losses and was dropping back to the south, uncovering 70th Army's flank. General Shkrylyov threw in the 712th Rifle Regiment east of Gnilets but this failed to change the situation as a regiment of infantry backed by 40 tanks turned west from Podolyan and struck the regiment, which had already taken heavy losses itself. It held off the German pressure while staging a fighting retreat toward Gnilets. By 1230, using every available subunit, the regiment managed to delay the attack on a line from Hill 232 to the eastern outskirts of Gnilets to Krasnyi Ugolok.

Among those defending this area was Jr. Sgt. Ilya Afanasyevich Usanin, an antitank gunner of the 23rd Antitank Battalion. He was serving as gunlayer of a 76mm cannon of the battalion's 3rd Battery, helping to cover the retreat of the 712th. As German tanks approached around Hill 232 he was able to knock one out before his gun's commander was killed. He now took leadership of the crew until all were disabled, when he managed to knock out a second one. After he had used all his ammunition he threw himself under a tank armed with a grenade. He was buried in a mass grave in the village of Tagino in the Oryol Region, and on November 16 he was made a Hero of the Soviet Union.

As the division was being outflanked the German attack from the north was renewed, breaking the defense and spreading toward Gnilets, threatening the 712th with encirclement. Despite continuing resistance the 132nd was facing significantly superior forces and began falling back during the afternoon. At this point German air attacks were shifted from 13th Army's sector to 70th Army's right flank. Ju 87 dive bombers were used in considerable numbers. The retreat was given fire cover by the 1st Battalion of the 605th Rifle Regiment, deployed north of Gnilets. This machine gun and mortar fire separated the German infantry from the armor and before long six German tanks were on fire on the battlefield. The battalion commander, Captain Kozmenko, ordered his men to stand to the death.

Three German attacks followed, at heavy cost in casualties, and after these failed a further bombardment by 80 aircraft struck the 1st Battalion for some 20 minutes. Many defenders were repeatedly buried by earth from the explosions, while others were killed or wounded. This was followed by another attack by 15 tanks and a battalion of infantry, again without success. By 19:00 hours the division had consolidated to the southwest from the northern outskirts of Bobrik to the northeastern outskirts of Probuzhdenie to Obydenki to the northern outskirts of Izmailovo. Overnight, Kozmenko's battalion was encircled but it continued to hold fast until orders arrived from Shkrylyov to break out and link up with friendly units. Overall, the stiff resistance of the 132nd and 280th had ground the German attack to a standstill and all further efforts to break the defense of 70th Army's right flank failed. A renewed effort on July 8 that involved up to 60 tanks was thrown back. By the end of this day the 9th Army had suffered about 42,000 casualties killed and wounded in four days of combat, although Central Front's losses had also been very high. The next day 9th Army's share of the offensive was halted.

=== Operation Kutuzov ===
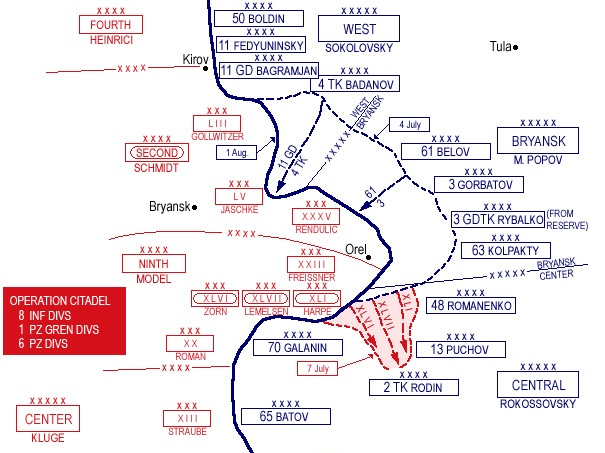
Map of Operation Kutuzov. Note position of 70th Army.

On July 12 the left flank forces of Western Front and the Bryansk Front began the counteroffensive against the Oryol salient. On the same day Rokossovskii ordered his Front to be ready to go over to the attack on July 15. Apart from the 13th, his armies had emerged relatively unscathed from the defensive battle. 70th Army, with the 19th Tank Corps, was to hold a line from Katomki to Shepelevo to Verkhnyaya Grankina to Chern using three divisions while the remaining forces were to attack from Teploe to Muravl. They were first to destroy the forces of 9th Army that had penetrated the Front's positions and regain the original line by the end of July 17. Following this, they were to continue to advance in the general direction of Oryol. In the first phase the 70th was to specifically cooperate with 13th and 48th Armies, as well as 16th Air Army. After an extensive regrouping the 28th Corps was deployed along the line Krasavka–Buzovo–Katomki.

On the first day, in common with most of the Front, Galinin's forces only made slight gains. The following morning, units on his right wing defeated the German grouping in the area of Height 250 and reached the area of Gnilets. German resistance was stubborn, based on covering detachments of infantry and tanks (some disabled from the earlier fighting) as the main forces fell back to their July 5 jumping-off positions. These had been well prepared over months and the German command expected to halt the offensive here.

The commander of 9th Army, Gen. W. Model, demanded that his troops maintain these positions, but Central Front's right wing armies maintained their momentum and on July 21 broke through the line along the Ochka River before pushing onward toward Kamenets and Kromy. At about this time the 132nd and 280th were both pulled back into Front reserves.

== Into Ukraine ==
On August 10 the 132nd was moved to the Reserve of the Supreme High Command for rebuilding. It returned to the fighting front on September 1, now assigned to the 77th Rifle Corps of Central Front's 60th Army. During the advance through eastern Ukraine the division assisted in liberating the town of Bakhmach and was given its name as a divisional honorific:

BAKHMACH – ... 132nd Rifle Division (Major General Shkrylyov, Timofei Kalinovich)... The troops that participated in the liberation of Konotop and Bakhmach, by order of the Supreme Commander-in-Chief of 9 September 1943 and a commendation in Moscow, are given a salute of 12 artillery salvoes by 124 guns.

In recognition of its services in the Kursk battle, on September 15 the division was further awarded its first Order of the Red Banner.

In the last week of the month the 132nd was one of the first rifle divisions to approach the Dniepr River. On September 25, Shkrylyov organized a crossing operation near the village of Stary Glybov (today flooded under the Kyiv Reservoir) which succeeded at considerable cost in casualties. For his leadership Shkrylyov would be made a Hero of the Soviet Union on October 17, along with 13 other officers and men.

=== Battles for Kyiv ===
On September 30 the commander of Voronezh Front's (as of October 20 1st Ukrainian) 38th Army, Maj. Gen. N. E. Chibisov, presented a plan to his Front commander, Army Gen. N. F. Vatutin, to capture Kyiv through a double envelopment by two rifle corps. This overly ambitious plan did create a pair of bridgeheads, but the attempt collapsed by October 3. At midnight on October 5 both the 60th and 13th Armies were transferred from Central Front. They were to join 38th Army in a further effort to take the city from the north.

On October 6 Vatutin assigned the following task to 60th Army's commander, Lt. Gen. I. D. Chernyakhovskii, after assigning him the 17th Guards Rifle Corps and the 1st Guards Cavalry Corps: to clear the south bank of the Uzh River on October 6–7 and take a bridgehead on the south bank of the Teteriv River on a sector from Pilyava to Zatonsk. Overnight on October 7/8 the 1st Guards Cavalry would cross the Dniepr and the Teteriv, then launch a main attack to the southwest between the Zdvizh and Irpen Rivers, rolling up the German front. Chernyakhovskii decided to lead with 1st Guards Cavalry and 77th Corps toward Manuilsk and Litvinovka, with 24th and 30th Rifle Corps supporting with an attack toward Dymer. However, this plan did not hold up due to divergent axes of the various corps.

A German counteroffensive by elements of 7th Panzer, 399th Infantry, and 217th Infantry Divisions struck 60th Army heavily in the Hornostaipil area throughout October 6–7, after which the panzers were pulled back to reserve near Ivanivka. The next day Chernyakhovskii took the initiative at Hornostaipil, and mutual attacks also began south of Chornobil on October 9. On this date Shkrylyov was badly concussed and was evacuated to hospital. After recovering in December he attended the Voroshilov Academy before taking command of the 64th Rifle Division for the duration of the war. He was replaced the next day by Col. Ivan Sergeevich Pakhomov. By this time, 60th Army had a large number of Dniepr crossings in operation, including a 30-ton capacity low-water bridge, four 30-ton ferries, 12 two-to-12-ton ferries, and a landing crossing. On this date it was reported that the strength of the 132nd had dropped quite low, with just 3,194 personnel, second lowest in the Army, with 26 82mm and four 120mm mortars, four 76mm regimental and 18 76mm divisional guns, but a nearly full allotment of 11 122mm howitzers.

At noon on October 11 the 60th and 38th Armies attacked simultaneously as German counterattacks struck back, including at 77th Corps along both banks of the Teteriv. A particularly strong attack by 7th and 8th Panzer south of the river reached the rear of 1st Guards Cavalry and cut it off from its crossings. The Army's 17th and 18th Guards Rifle Corps, on a secondary axis, made no progress at all. Further efforts to gain traction over the next three days were also futile, with German tanks breaking through to the bridgehead at Lyutizh at one point. At 01:50 hours on October 15 Vatutin signaled Chernyakhovskii as follows:

The army's forces are unsuccessful along almost all sectors and are standing in place. The chief reason for this is the dispersion of men and materiel...
If you do not adopt decisive measures for pushing the 1st Guards Cavalry Corps forward into the enemy's depth, then there is a danger that the cavalry corps will be transformed into a typical rifle formation...
I order:
1. To plan and organize the breakthrough of the enemy's front along a narrow sector, by creating an artillery density of no less than 150 tubes per kilometre of front.

In a further message, Vatutin stressed the significance of linking up the bridgeheads of 60th and 38th Armies.

The offensive was renewed on October 15 at 14:00 hours. 60th Army made only minor gains, taking the village of Rovy. Only part of the Army attacked the next day, again with little success. Meanwhile, 1st Guards Cavalry was suffering significant losses trying to break out, and it was not until overnight on October 17/18 that its relief by 77th Corps began, and it began its transfer to 38th Army. 60th Army was now officially on the defensive. During October 18–23 it was involved in heavy fighting as German forces repeatedly tried to collapse the bridgehead over the Teteriv. At 23:00 the next day the STAVKA released directive No. 30232, which set out the plan and date for a renewed offensive. Most importantly, the 3rd Guards Tank Army would be secretly removed from the bridgehead south of Kyiv at Velykyi Bukryn and shifted to the Lyutizh bridgehead.

A major regrouping took place during October 25-November 1, entirely at night or covered by smoke screens. By the latter date up to seven divisions faced 60th Army, quite a high concentration, although all were significantly under strength. While the 132nd was also well below its authorized strength, its total personnel had been brought up to 6,142, largely through drafting Ukrainians from the retaken territory. The Army's task was much as previous, to attack in the direction of Rovy and Dymer with nine divisions and then advance between the Zdvizh and Irpin, covering the flank of 38th Army while the latter took Kyiv and it captured the railway from the city to Korosten. Subsequently, the offensive would be developed to the west. Six divisions and a tank regiment would be in first echelon; 77th Corps was designated to make a secondary attack with the 143rd and 132nd toward Sychevka, Manuilsk and Andreevka. Its breakthrough sector was 3 km wide, and it would be supported by 53.3 guns and mortars per kilometre, with an opening bombardment of 40 minute duration.

The offensive opened at 08:00 hours on November 3 and the first echelon attacked at 08:40 in the face of heavy defensive fire and counterattacks. 77th Corps broke through the defense along the entire breakthrough sector, took Sychevka, and advanced another 4 km to the west. The terrain was heavily forested, and the artillery began displacing forward to deal with strongpoints at close range. Five counterattacks by tanks and infantry were repelled, and 550 prisoners were taken by the two Armies, but the first day objectives were not completely met, and Chernyakhovskii was constantly urged to increase his pace. The following day the 143rd and 132nd continued to advance, gaining as much as 6 km while taking Manuilsk and Andreevka. The fighting continued overnight, and on November 5 the Army gained another 20 km along its left wing, but the next day the 143rd and 280th maintained a defensive front while the 132nd failed to make progress west of Manuilsk. This failure led to Colonel Pakhomov being relieved of his command, and being replaced by Col. Ignat Timofeevich Stefanovich. Meanwhile, 38th Army was fighting in the center and southwest of Kyiv.

==== Advance from Kyiv ====
During November 6, while 77th Corps continued to hold its previous positions, other elements of 60th Army advanced up to 12 km on the left flank. 38th Army completed clearing Kyiv early in the morning and then advanced another 20 km. 8th Panzer withdrew across the Zdvizh, and the Kyiv–Korosten railroad was cut. However, the Army was beginning to face serious shortages of ammunition and fuel. Vatutin ordered the offensive to continue into western Ukraine with 60th Army directed to take bridgeheads over the Teteriv in the area of Radomyshl by the end of November 9. The general line of advance was to be to the west on the Korosten axis. By the end of November 8 the Army gained another 10 km against weak resistance. The next day the Teteriv was crossed and over 100 prisoners were taken, along with a large quantity of abandoned equipment. By this time 60th and 38th Armies were spread along an attack front of some 220 km, and the German forces facing the 60th were retreating southwest toward Zhytomyr.

==== Kiev Strategic Defensive Operation ====
By November 12 the artillery was increasingly falling behind the advancing infantry and very little ammunition was at the front. The STAVKA was concerned that Vatutin was failing to consolidate captured ground and also noted increasing counterattacks. 38th Army was ordered to take up a static defense, while 60th moved a total of four divisions into Front reserve. During November 15 the 38th was struck by heavy counterattacks on several sectors, and lost some ground. Vatutin now ordered the 141st and 132nd Divisions, with the headquarters of 30th Corps, to be regrouped to the Zhytomyr area; this force was directed to take up positions on the north bank of the Teteriv, with the 132nd on a sector from Levkiv to Korostyshiv. By now the strength of the division had again declined to 4,613.

Having seized the initiative the German forces made repeated attacks on November 16 east of Zhytomyr. 7th Panzer and 20th Motorized Divisions forced a crossing of the Teteriv and took Levkiv. 88th Infantry Division also crossed the river from the south and pushed the 218th Rifle Division back to Zhytomyr's outskirts. Vatutin now transferred the 218th's 23rd Rifle Corps to 60th Army, and Chernyakhovskii was given responsibility for defending Zhytomyr "to the last man." At 18:00 hours the 30th Corps, now with a rifle brigade added, was assigned to another sector along the Teteriv, facing east and southeast; the 132nd defended on a sector from Koziivka to Haradsk. The following day saw limited German successes east of Zhytomyr, but 7th Panzer and 20th Motorized did retake Vatskiv and reached the paved road from Zhytomyr to Kyiv. On November 18 a concentric attack was launched by these two divisions, as well as 8th Panzer from the north, which encircled 1st Guards Cavalry Corps, one regiment each of the 121st and 141st, and all of 218th Rifle Divisions within the city. By the end of the day the main bodies of the 121st and 141st had fallen back to the north, with the latter in the Veresy area. Overnight, Vatutin decided to order the breakout of the encircled force. Chernyakhovskii's plan was to lead with the cavalry to the north, with the rifle forces providing cover, while the remainder of 30th Corps, including the 132nd, made a relief attack from the north. This was largely successful, and during the day the Corps successfully defended its new positions south of Chernykhiv (the source of the Army commander's family name) while putting itself in order.

During November 20 the fighting focused on Radomyshl, but the next day, in aid of this push, 8th Panzer attacked toward Chernykhiv. In the evening the 1st Guards Army started to arrive from the Reserve of the Supreme High Command. Chernykhiv fell to 8th Panzer on November 22, but the German offensive was beginning to run out of steam and part of 60th Army's left flank forces attempted to gain jumping-off positions for a counterblow, but due to the losses to the rifle divisions and the continuing shortage of ammunition this largely failed. Vatutin now planned for an attack on November 25 by 60th and 1st Guards Armies from the Radomyshl area against the flank of the German forces threatening Brusyliv. The 60th was ordered to form a shock group to attack toward Kocheriv and Vodotyi, while also retaking Chernykhiv. 30th Corps kicked off a day early, frustrating the German efforts against Brusyliv. However, the planned attack the next day did not take place, again largely due to ammunition supply. The tempo of the fighting declined during the last days of November, as the German forces had shot their bolt, and the weather finally cleared enough to allow Soviet air support. Vatutin committed just the fresh 94th Rifle Corps to the fighting on November 27; by three days later the front had stabilized. The same day the 132nd returned to the Reserve of the Supreme High Command, and on December 1 Colonel Stefanovich left the division, being replaced by Col. Aleksei Mikhailovich Belov. It returned to the fighting front on December 14, now as part of 105th Rifle Corps. On December 29 Belov was in turn replaced by Col. Pyotr Savvich Gavilevskii. This officer had previously led several rifle divisions and had just completed an accelerated course at the Voroshilov Academy.

== Battles in Belarus ==
65th Army was under command of Lt. Gen. P. I. Batov, and 105th Corps came under his command from Belorussian Front reserves just after January 1. The Front commander, General Rokossovskii, was planning a new offensive against German 2nd Army to seize Mazyr and Kalinkavichy with his 65th and 61st Armies in accordance with a STAVKA directive of January 2:

Begin an offensive with the forces on the front's left wing, defeat the enemy's Kalinkovichi-Mozyr' grouping, and subsequently attack toward Bobruisk and Minsk... The 12th Panzer and 251st Infantry Divisions, and also units from the enemy's XX Army Corps, were operating against 65th Army. The forward edge of the enemy's defense extended from Kazansk through Terebnia and Kholodniki to Viazovitsa.

Rokossovskii was reinforced with the 1st Guards Tank Corps to spearhead 65th Army's advance, as well as the 2nd and 7th Guards Cavalry Corps, which were ideally suited to leading 61st Army through the swampy terrain along the Pripyat River.

=== Kalinkavichy-Mazyr Offensive ===
Rokossovskii ordered Batov to conduct his main attack in the roughly 15 km-wide sector extending from the Ipa River north of Kalinkavichy to Viazovitsa northeast of the city using two of his rifle corps and a supporting attack in the Novosichi area with a single corps. Batov designated the 105th and 18th Rifle Corps for the main blow against defenses manned by LVI Panzer Corps. The two rifle corps were to penetrate the first German defensive belt on January 8 and 9 and then support the commitment of 1st Guards Tanks Corps. Maj. Gen. D. F. Alekseev, commander of the 105th, deployed the 132nd and 75th Guards Rifle Divisions in first echelon with the 253rd Rifle Division in second. The Corps would be supported by the 255th Tank Regiment, 2nd Guards Tank Brigade, plus the 1816th and 1888th Self-Propelled Artillery Regiments, both of which were equipped with SU-76s.

However, as is so often the case, the original plan did not survive the first day of combat. Overnight on January 5/6 the 5th Panzer Division withdrew 10 km from its forward defenses in the swampy Novosichi area. This forced Alekseev's Corps to advance its lines and regroup its forces before launching its assault, which began at 09:40 hours on January 8, 10 minutes before the artillery completed its 40-45 minute preparation. However, the 105th and 18th Corps immediately encountered fierce German resistance, and the attacks faltered after just minimal gains. The 75th Guards, for example, had no success and remained in its jumping-off positions. Batov proposed to commit his 1st Guards Tank Corps, but Rokossovskii realized it was both premature and dangerous to do so. The fighting on January 9 saw much the same results, but in the afternoon Batov ordered the tankers to enter the battle; this was countermanded by Rokossovskii several minutes later. On the evening of January 10 he called a conference at Batov's command post, which included officers of 61st Army as well:

He said that the unsuccessful beginning of the operation was the result of the forces' stereotypical actions. Each day an artillery preparation was conducted, and then the infantry went over to the offensive accompanied by a considerable number of direct support infantry tanks. In addition, the attack line was located too far from the enemy, and, moving through deep snow, quite naturally the infantry lagged behind the tanks.

He now proposed a change in tactics and the direction of the main attack. 1st Guards Tank Corps was to attack in the first echelon of 65th Army on the morning of January 11 from Martynovichi to 3 km northwest of Terebnia. It was to be supported by the entire 4th Artillery Penetration Corps, dedicated formations of 16th Air Army, and the divisions of 18th and 105th Corps. The tanks were to penetrate the German defenses, advance along the Nizhne-Kozlovichi, Koshchichi and Turovichi axis, and capture Kalinkavichy by an assault from the northwest.

Overnight on January 10/11 an extensive regrouping took place. Snowy weather forced cancellation of the air support, but the artillery preparation began at noon, this time only long enough for the tanks to reach the forward German trenches. A second wave with assault infantry began moving forward a minute later. The first wave raised up a whirlwind of snowflakes, screening the second wave from observation. The infantry was soon involved in hand-to-hand combat in the trenches. The German defenses collapsed, unleashing an irresistible tide of riflemen, tanks and self-propelled guns. The weather improved by 15:00 hours, allowing up to 60 aircraft to strike German positions at Domanovichi and Anisovichi and break up a planned counterattack. By the end of the day 1st Guards Tank Corps had advanced 15–18 km with the rifle divisions, including the 132nd.

The advance went on through the night as the hard-pressed German forces attempted to escape from partial encirclement and take up new defenses along the Ipa. Early on January 13 Batov issued orders that the final assault on Kalinkavichy would be made by 1st Guards Tank Corps and 105th Corps from the north. The attack began at first light against diminishing German resistance. The two panzer divisions were moving on the Ipa with 18th Corps in pursuit and XX Corps was in the process of abandoning both Kalinkavichy and Mazyr. By noon the 1st Guards Tank Corps had captured the fortified strongpoints at Kolbasichy and Slobodka, just 5 km northwest of Kalinkavichy. The advance halted here briefly in the face of heavy fire from German rearguards. Airstrikes hit German artillery as the infantry of 105th Corps caught up with the armor. By now the 253rd Division had joined its corps-mates, supporting the tankers until they reached the outskirts after which it wheeled westward toward the Ipa with the 75th Guards. The 132nd cooperated with the 193rd Rifle Division and 115th Rifle Brigade of 19th Rifle Corps to reach the town from the northeast. At 04:00 hours of January 14 the tanks entered the northern outskirts along with the 132nd to learn the last of the German troops had withdrawn. They linked up with 61st Army's 12th Guards Rifle Division which had just entered the city from the east. Rokossovskii now ordered Batov to begin the second stage of the offensive. The next day the division was decorated with the Order of Suvorov, 2nd Degree.

==== Ozarichy-Ptsich Offensive ====
Rokossovskii was still operating under the STAVKA directive of January 2. The 65th and 61st Armies were now to penetrate the German defenses along the Ipa and, in conjunction with 48th Army to the north, capture Ozarichy and Mikhnovichy, advance to secure bridgeheads over the Ptich River, and continue the offensive toward Babruysk. After a short pause to regroup and refit, the 65th and 48th Armies were to begin operations on the morning of January 16. Batov's forces were to start on a 25 km-wide sector along the Ipa from Kaplichy northeastward to the Koreny region, 10 km east of Ozarichy; the 27th, 19th and 18th Rifle Corps would be in first echelon, while the 105th was in second echelon in the Kholodniky region. His Army faced the weak 707th Security Division on LVI Panzer Corps' extended left wing. The 105th was to reinforce the 19th and 18th Corps whenever and wherever required. As the 1st Guards Tank Corps had been withdrawn for rest and refitting the 65th Army would have only negligible armor support.

Overnight on January 15/16 the 19th Rifle Corps began a stealthy advance across the Ipa, penetrating the positions of 707th Security, which had just been reinforced by battalion groups from the 35th Infantry Division. Elements of 82nd Rifle Division seized the village of Novoselky after a see-saw battle and the remaining defenders withdrew westward through heavily forested swampland. The Corps continued to exploit on January 17 and the 707th was soon scattered to the winds. The 27th Corps exploited this success by pushing westward 3–5 km toward Ozarichy. By the end of January 19 two of its divisions, probably reinforced by the 132nd which was in the 105th Corps' first echelon, reached positions extending from the eastern approaches to Syshchichy, 5 km south of Ozarichy, northeastward past the eastern approaches of Ozarichy to Zabolote, 10 km northeast of Ozarichy, already in the hands of 38th Guards Rifle Division.

After a regrouping and a pause to bring up artillery and ammunition, the three forward Corps of 65th Army resumed their general advance on the morning of January 20. 19th Corps, now reinforced with the 132nd, was ordered to destroy the German defense along the Visha River and capture Savichy by inserting the division between the 82nd and 162nd Rifle Divisions. After taking Berezniaky from 4th Panzer Division the corps pushed westward until meeting tougher resistance just to the east of Savichy on January 21. By the end of the next day, Rokossovskii's forces had torn a 12 km-deep and 15 km-wide hole in the German defenses between the 2nd Army and the 9th Army, and there was virtually nothing either could do to restore their fronts. He now ordered Batov to use every resource to crack open the remaining German defenses at Ozarichy and Savichy.

In order to maintain his success, Rokossovskii directed the commander of 61st Army to form forward detachments and ski detachments in all his first echelon divisions and infiltrate them deeply into the German rear areas. This began overnight on January 21/22. From then until January 25 the 65th and 61st Armies continued pounding the defenses of the two German armies' defenses from Ozarichy to Krotov. The 35th Infantry's positions in and north of the former were repeatedly assaulted, but gains were minimal. Rokossovskii now created a new shock group at the junction of the 65th's 18th and 19th Corps to strike northwestward toward Kriukhovichy and Savin Rog. To ensure success this group was reinforced with a second echelon made up of the three divisions of 105th Corps. The renewed offensive had mixed results, but by January 28 the 253rd and 132nd Divisions were approaching Savin Rog after a gain of 6 km and were engaging the lead elements of 110th Infantry Division. The 110th contained the Soviet advance, but its counterattacks to close the gap between the two German armies were unsuccessful. Batov now spread out his forces to widen the gap. The 253rd and 132nd, plus the 75th Guards, which had been held as the Army reserve, reinforced the 19th Corps to advance eastward and westward and seize ground north of Savichy and Syshchichy to the west. Given its untenable position, 4th Panzer had no choice but to withdraw from Savichy on February 4.

==== Parichi-Bobruisk Offensive ====
While the 48th and part of 65th Armies continued to advance the 105th Corps remained in the Ozarichy area until February 26 when it began to shift to the north. On February 17, Belorussian Front had been split, with the part remaining under Rokossovskii's command being redesignated as 1st Belorussian Front. Throughout March the 65th continued to fight local battles to improve its positions, and on March 17 the Corps reached 9th Army's new defensive line along the Tremlia River. These had been built weeks earlier and would hold until the start of the summer offensive. By the beginning of April the 132nd had been moved to the 25th Rifle Corps in the reserves of 2nd Belorussian Front, but later that month this Front was reabsorbed by 1st Belorussian, and the division returned to 77th Rifle Corps, which was now part of 47th Army. It would remain under this Army's command for the duration of the war. At this time the division's personnel were reported as roughly half Russian and half Ukrainian.

== Operation Bagration ==
On May 4 Colonel Gavilevskii was relieved of his command for the "unauthorized execution of a subordinate commander" and abuse of power. He was convicted by a tribunal in June and given a five-year suspended sentence, but went on to lead the 370th and 364th Rifle Divisions, and would be promoted to major general on April 20, 1945. He was replaced by Col. Yakov Gerasimovich Tsvintarnyi, who had been in command of a rifle regiment of the 143rd Rifle Division. Before the start of the summer offensive it joined the 165th and 260th Rifle Divisions in the new 129th Rifle Corps. 47th Army was one of five Armies on the western flank of the Front, south of the Pripet Marshes in the area of Kovel, and so played no role in the initial stages of the offensive.

=== Lublin–Brest Offensive ===
The west wing Armies joined the offensive at 05:30 hours on July 18, following a 30-minute artillery preparation. 47th Army's shock group had been shifted to its left flank during July 13–16. Forward detachments of battalion or regimental size attacked and soon determined that the German first and part of the second trench lines had been abandoned, so a further 110-minute preparation was cancelled. The leading Armies (47th, 8th Guards and 69th) reached the second defense zone along the Vyzhuvka River on July 19 and quickly forced a crossing, which led to the zone's collapse by noon, followed by a pursuit of the defeated forces, advancing 20–25 km. On July 23 the 132nd would be awarded its second Order of the Red Banner for its role in the capture of Kovel.

On July 20 the leading Armies reached the final defense line along the Western Bug River and began taking crossing points off the march with their mobile units. 47th Army was now being led by the 2nd Guards Cavalry Corps, and by dusk was fighting along a line from outside Zalesie to Grabowo to Zabuzhye after a further advance of 18–26 km. The Front's forces were now in a position to begin the encirclement of the German forces around Brest.

The main forces of the Front's left wing were directed against Lublin on July 21, while 47th Army, along with a mobile group of 2nd Guards Cavalry and 11th Tank Corps, was tasked with reaching Siedlce. By the end of July 23 the Army had reached the line Danze–Podewucze–Pszwloka, following an advance of 52 km in three days. By July 27 it was running into greater resistance, especially in the area of Biała Podlaska and Mendzizec, which blocked the encirclement of part of the Brest grouping. On July 29 Brest was finally encircled and taken, and 129th Corps was redirected to the north from its previous westward advance. The next day it outflanked Siedlce from the northeast and northwest. The city fell on July 31.

By this time, 47th Army was spread across a front of 74 km. Meanwhile, on July 28 the 2nd Tank Army was approaching the Praga suburb of Warsaw, which the STAVKA soon gave orders to be seized, along with bridgeheads over the Vistula River. This Army's attack soon ran into heavy resistance and stalled. The Praga area contained complex and modern fortifications and would prove a hard nut to crack. The German command soon struck with a powerful counterattack of five panzer and one infantry divisions against the boundary of 2nd Tank and 47th Armies in an effort to hold the place, and 2nd Tank was ordered not to attempt to storm the fortifications, but to wait for heavy artillery. In addition, both Armies were suffering severe shortages of fuel and ammunition after the long advance. In the course of the following fighting, on August 12 Colonel Tsvintarnyi was killed in action; he would be buried at Mińsk Mazowiecki. On August 21 he was replaced by Col. Nikolai Vasilevich Smirnov, who had previously led the 137th and 354th Rifle Divisions. On September 15 the Army went over to the defense.

== Into Poland and Germany ==
On October 20 Colonel Smirnov was removed for "failing to complete a combat mission"; he would next take up the post of military commandant of Poznań. He was replaced by Col. Ivan Vladimirovich Solovyov, who had served the previous 18 months as chief of staff of the 175th Rifle Division. At the start of January 1945, prior to the beginning of the winter offensive into Poland, the 129th Corps also contained the 260th and 143rd Rifle Divisions. For this offensive 1st Belorussian Front, now under command of Marshal Zhukov, was ordered to launch a supporting attack north of Warsaw with the 47th along a 4 km-wide front to clear the German forces between the Vistula and Western Bug, in conjunction with the left wing of 2nd Belorussian Front. Following this the Army was to outflank Warsaw from the northeast and help capture the city in cooperation with the 1st Polish Army and part of 61st and 2nd Guards Tank Armies.

The main offensive began on January 12 but 47th Army did not begin its attack until January 15, with a 55-minute artillery preparation. By day's end it had cleared the inter-river area east of Modlin. Overnight the 129th Corps forced a crossing of the frozen Vistula. On January 17 the 1st Polish Army began the fight for Warsaw and, threatened with encirclement, the German garrison abandoned it. As a result of this success the division won its second honorific:

WARSAW – ... 132nd Rifle Division (Colonel Solovyov, Ivan Vladimirovich)... The troops that participated in the battles to liberate Warsaw, by order of the Supreme Commander-in-Chief of 17 January 1945 and a commendation in Moscow, are given a salute of 24 artillery salvoes by 324 guns.

In addition, on April 6 Solovyov would be made a Hero of the Soviet Union. Following this success the STAVKA ordered an all-out advance to the Oder River. 47th Army reached the Bzura by 18:00 hours that same day. As the Front's right flank lengthened to 110–120 km by January 25 the 47th, 1st Polish, and 3rd Shock Armies were brought up to guard against any counteroffensive from German forces in East Pomerania. By the end of the next day elements of the Army captured Bydgoszcz and Nakło nad Notecią.

Over the following weeks the Front's right wing forces eliminated the German garrisons blockaded in Schneidemühl, Deutsch Krone, and Arnswalde, but otherwise gained only up to 10 km of ground. For its role in the taking of Deutsch Krone the 712th Rifle Regiment was given the Order of Kutuzov, 3rd Degree, on April 5. The German 11th Army launched a hastily planned counteroffensive at Stargard on February 15 and two days later the 47th Army was forced to abandon the towns of Piritz and Bahn and fall back 8–12 km.

=== East Pomeranian Offensive ===
After the Stargard offensive was shut down on February 18, Zhukov decided split the 11th Army by attacking toward the Baltic Sea. 47th Army was tasked with reaching and taking the city of Altdamm. This was accomplished on March 20, and the Army began regrouping toward Berlin.

== Berlin Offensive ==
At the start of the final offensive on the German capital the 47th Army was deployed in the bridgehead over the Oder at Küstrin on a 8 km-wide sector. In the days just before the attack commenced the 132nd was one of five divisions of the Army that relieved the right-flank divisions of 5th Shock Army. The 47th planned to make its main strike in the center, a 4.3 km sector from Neulewin to Neubarnim. The 129th Corps now consisted of the 143rd, 132nd, and 82nd Rifle Divisions, and all three were in first echelon. At this time the rifle divisions' strengths varied between 5,000 and 6,000 men each. The divisions in first echelon had the immediate goal of penetrating the defense to a depth of 4.5–5 km, which would carry them through the first two German positions. The Army was supported by 101 tanks and self-propelled guns.

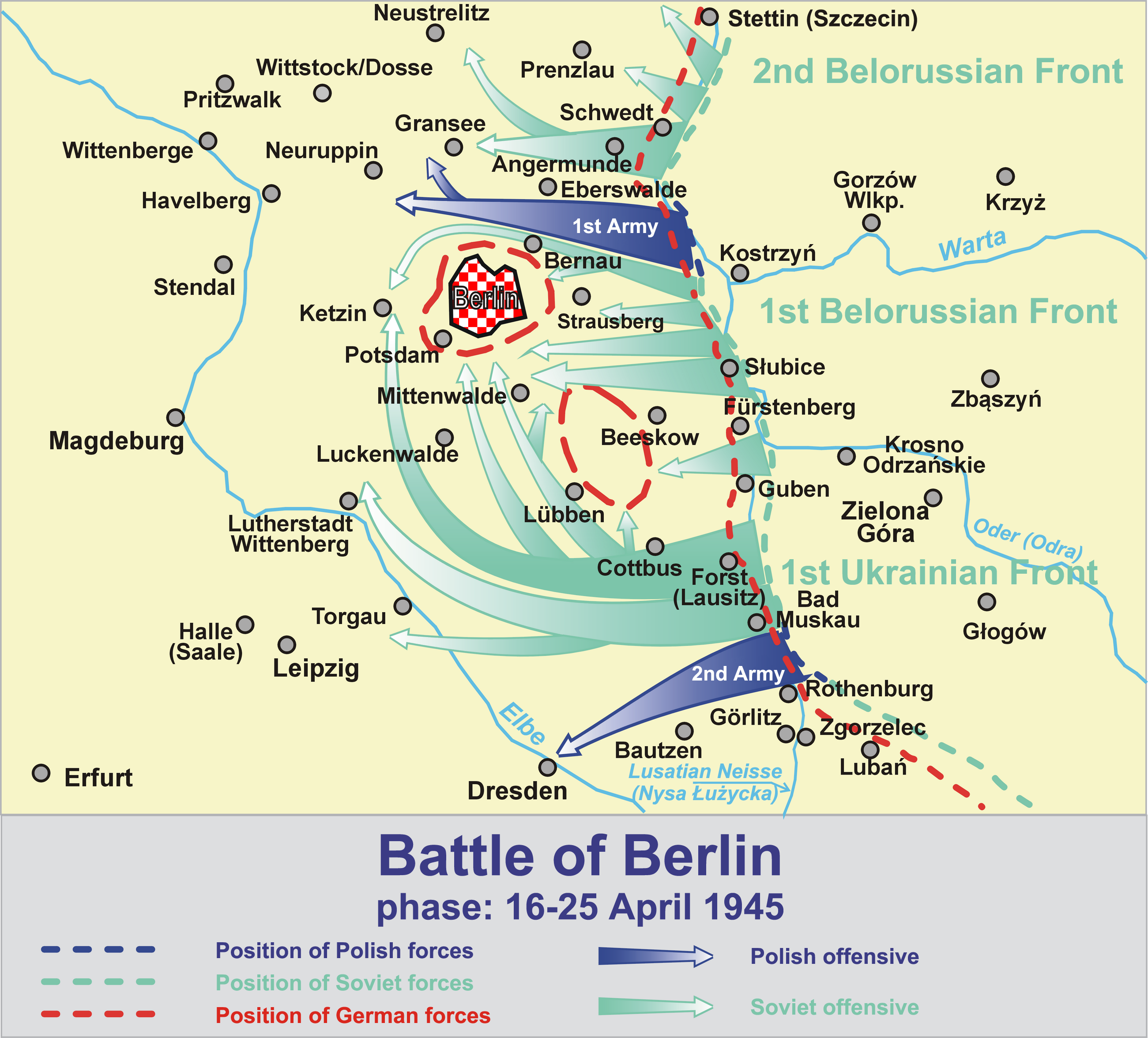
Battle of Berlin. Note location of the Küstrin (Kostrzyn) bridgehead.

During April 14–15, 47th Army carried out reconnaissance actions from Karlsbiese to outside Ortwig with scout units of five divisions. The main offensive began before dawn on April 16 on the sectors of 1st Belorussian and 1st Ukrainian Fronts. A massive artillery bombardment was launched at 05:00 hours, except on the fronts of 47th and 33rd Armies. On 47th Army's front the bombardment started 0550 and lasted 25 minutes. The infantry went into the attack at 06:15 against defenders that were badly shaken and had suffered significant casualties. The 82nd Division failed to reach the forward edge of the German defense by the end of the bombardment, causing an extension of five minutes. A pair of reconnaissance battalions of the 132nd broke through the first trenches in heavy combat, made a 2.5 km advance, and by dusk had consolidated on a line from Neubarnim station to Marker 6.4. 129th Corps overall had suppressed the German fire resistance, driven off a counterattack, and cleared the strongpoint at Neubarnim. After an advance of 6 km it reached a line from Herrenhof to Neunzigert. 47th Army had broken through the main defensive zone, and on its left flank reached the intermediate defense position.

Zhukov ordered that the attack continue through the night, following a 30-40-minute artillery preparation, so as to break through the intermediate defense position. 47th Army made some progress through the dark, but its general offensive began at 08:00 hours after another 30-minute preparation. 129th Corps, still with three divisions in line, repelled a pair of counterattacks, forced a crossing of the Friedlanderstrom Canal between the 150th and 171st Rifle Divisions, and ended the day on a line from the southern outskirts of Wewe to the northern outskirts of Kunersdorf. In the afternoon one division was pulled back to second echelon, and the Corps recorded a gain of 4 km. Overnight, the troops of the Front consolidated their positions and took part in reconnaissance. After a short artillery preparation the offensive continued on the morning of April 18.

47th Army stepped off at 10:00 hours after a 40-minute bombardment and through the day 129th Corps covered another 4 km. Despite the day's successes Zhukov was becoming concerned that the offensive was proceeding too slowly, and ordered that steps be taken to improve command and control, beginning on April 19. In addition, the 47th, as well as the 3rd Shock and 5th Shock Armies, were to shift their axes of attack from northwest and west to west and southwest, with the objective of breaking into Berlin as quickly as possible. Specifically, the 47th was directed to advance on Haselberg, Baiersdorf, Schildow, and Hermsdorf; these last two were in the northern part of the city.

Fighting on April 19 was focused on the third defensive zone which now contained German reserves moved up from the city. 47th Army had brought up its artillery overnight and made its main attack at noon, following an artillery preparation of 30 minutes. 129th Corps, still with two divisions up and one back, now had the direct assistance of 9th Guards Tank Corps and this helped it capture German strongpoints at Frankenfelde and Sternebeck after heavy fighting. Following this it advanced 12 km to reach a line from the Markgrafensee to Bisow Creek, which took it through the third defense zone to a depth of about 4 km. One of the brigades of 9th Guards Tank Corps went on to take Steinbeck. Units of 125th Rifle Corps made repeated attempts to break into the Freienwalder Staatforst woods without success and was ordered to make use of the gains of 129th Corps to its left to bypass the woods. To the rear the 7th Guards Cavalry Corps was waiting for the infantry to produce a gap in the German lines at or near the boundary of 77th and 125th Corps.

=== Encircling Berlin ===
Overnight, the 129th Corps, with 9th Guards Tank Corps and now 1st Mechanized Corps, both of 2nd Guards Tank Army pushed ahead another 3 km, capturing Bisow and Leuenburg station, outflanking the defense of the woods west of Haselburg. German resistance (606th Volksgrenadier, 25th Panzergrenadier and 1st Luftwaffe Field Divisions) was effectively crushed in front of 47th Army and German remnants streamed to the west, with just a few strongpoints holding out. 47th, 3rd Shock and 5th Shock Armies were ordered on April 20 to continue a rapid advance during the day with their first echelons and through the night with their second echelons. Overall the Army advanced 12 km during the day, and the mobile troops as much as 22 km, breaking through Berlin's outer ring on a 8 km sector from Leuenberg to Tiefensee. Overnight the Army cleared Bernau in cooperation with 9th Guards Tank Corps. Zhukov's first priority for the next day was to preempt any German effort to organize on the inner ring. The Army responded by taking Schenow, Zepernick and Buch.

During April 21 the 47th gained 15–20 km, cut the Berlin ring road, and closed up on the city's northern outskirts. The next day the Army, still with 9th Guards Tank Corps, continued attacking to the west in an effort to envelop the city from the north. By 20:00 hours the leading infantry began crossing the Havel River. By day's end 129th Corps was engaged along the Berlin internal defense line in and around Tegel. Only 60 km remained between the Army and 1st Ukrainian Front's 4th Guards Tank Army advancing from the south. For the next day the 47th was directed to reach the area of Spandau, then detach one division with one tank brigade from 9th Guards Tank Corps to drive towards Potsdam and take it, cutting the German retreat path from the city to the west. 129th Corps, still with two divisions leading, broke through several covering detachments and beat off several counterattacks, reaching a line from the south outskirts of Konradshöhe to the north bank of the Tegeler See by the end of the day, an advance of 2 km. During the day the Army had covered another 8 km to the west, crossed two corps over the Havel, and turned its front to the southwest. Overnight, Zhukov ordered the Army to complete the encirclement, in conjunction with 4th Guards Tank Army, by taking a line from Paren to Potsdam.

April 24 saw the 47th continuing to attack to the southwest toward Brandenburg. German forces on its right flank continued retreating to the south. 9th Guards Tank Cors, which had moved through the dark, managed to seize Nauen from the march at 08:00. 129th Corps covered the Army's left flank with 82nd Division while the 132nd and 143rd engaged in fighting in the area south of Siedlung-Schoenwald. The objective for April 25 remained Potsdam. At noon, men of the 328th Rifle Division, with tanks of the 6th Guards Tank Brigade, joined hands with 4th Guards Tank Army's 6th Guards Mechanized Corps, completing the encirclement of Berlin. 129th Corps pushed back several covering units to the east toward the city before breaking into the north and west outskirts of Spandau, with its front facing east and south.

At this point the combined strength of the 125th and 129th Rifle Corps, with the supporting 6th Artillery Division and 74th Antiaircraft Division was 43,077 personnel, with 593 mortars, 556 guns of 76mm or larger calibre, and 123 45mm antitank guns. During April 26 the 129th Corps was involved in heavy fighting in Spandau, attacking from north to west. German resistance was desperate, with every effort made to retain its hold on the bridges over the Havel. During the day Gartenstadt was cleared and the city center was reached, as 125th Corps also exerted pressure. By day's end the west bank of the river was almost completely cleared, cutting off the Potsdam grouping from the Berlin garrison. These victories and others effectively eliminated the last chance for the forces in Berlin to break out to the west.

On April 28, 47th Army was mainly occupied with mopping up the Potsdam area before regrouping during the afternoon for an advance westward on Bützow with its main forces, consisting of 77th and 129th Corps. By the end of the day these had reached a line from Buschow to Barnewitz to Brielow after covering 20 km in road column formation. The next day 129th Corps, facing no resistance, reached a line from Lipe to Bützow. April 30 saw the Corps attacking toward Premnitz, advancing 5 km, and reaching the line Lipe–Mutzlitz–Marzahn. By May 4 the 132nd had reached the Elbe River where it linked up with American forces.

== Postwar ==
The division ended the war as the 132nd Rifle, Bakhmach-Warsaw, twice Order of The Red Banner, Order of Suvorov Division. (Russian: 132-я стрелковая Бахмачско-Варшавская дважды Краснознамённая ордена Суворова дивизия.) In a final round of awards on May 28 the following decorations were presented:

- 498th Rifle Regiment - Order of Suvorov, 3rd Degree
- 605th Rifle Regiment - Order of Kutuzov, 3rd Degree
- 712th Rifle Regiment - Order of Suvorov, 3rd Degree
- 425th Artillery Regiment - Order of Kutuzov, 3rd Degree
- 23rd Antitank Battalion - Order of Bogdan Khmelnitsky, 3rd Degree

These were all for their parts in the fighting for Berlin.

According to STAVKA Order No. 11095 of May 29, part 2, the 132nd, along with its Corps and Army, was assigned to the Group of Soviet Forces in Germany. In February 1946 the 47th Army was disbanded, but 129th Corps remained in Germany. The 132nd was disbanded, along with the Corps, in early June 1946.
