= Savinichy rural council =

Coordinates: 53.4708°N 31.7613°E

Savinichy rural council (Belarusian: Савініцкі сельсавет, Russian: Савиничский сельсовет) is a former lower-level subdivision (selsoviet) of Klimavichy district, Mogilev region, Belarus. Its capital was the former village of Savinichy.

== History ==
It was created in 1965 from 15 settlements of the Yanowka rural council (renamed to Vysokae rural council). In 1970 the Savinichy forestry was organized, to manage the forests of the territory.

After the Chernobyl disaster most of the population of the rural council was resettled. In 1992 it was abolished and its territory was included into the Tsimanava rural council. The forestry administration, preserving its name, moved to Tsimanava rural council. Since 2008, the graduates of the Savinichy middle school meet annually in Tsimanava, where local palace of culture allocated some space for a museum of Savinichy rural council and its school. In 2015 a memorial stone with a plaque to Commemorate Savinichy was installed by the palace of culture in Tsimanava.
