= Kisyalyova Buda rural council =

Kisyalyova Buda rural council (Belarusian: Кісялёвабудскі сельсавет, Russian: Киселево-Будский сельсовет) is a lower-level subdivision (selsoviet) of Klimavichy district, Mogilev region, Belarus. According to the 2019 Belarus census, its population was 939.
