= Paloshkava, Klimavichy district =

Agrotown in Mogilev Region, Belarus

Paloshkava Палошкава (Belarusian) Полошково (Russian)
- Agrotown
- Location within Belarus
- Coordinates: 53°42′49″N 31°56′45″E
- Country: Belarus
- Region: Mogilev Region
- District: Klimavichy District
- Founded: 1712

Population (2007)
  - Total: 345
- Time zone: UTC+3 (MSK)
- Postal code: 213610
- Area code: +375 2244

Paloshkava (Belarusian: Палошкава, romanized: Pałoškava; Russian: Полошково, romanized: Poloshkovo) is an agrotown in Klimavichy District, Mogilev Region, Belarus. It is located 136 km from Mogilev and 12 km north of Klimavichy on the bank of the Sosnovka River. Since February 2010, Paloshkava serves as the administrative center of the Damamyerychy selsoviet.

== History ==
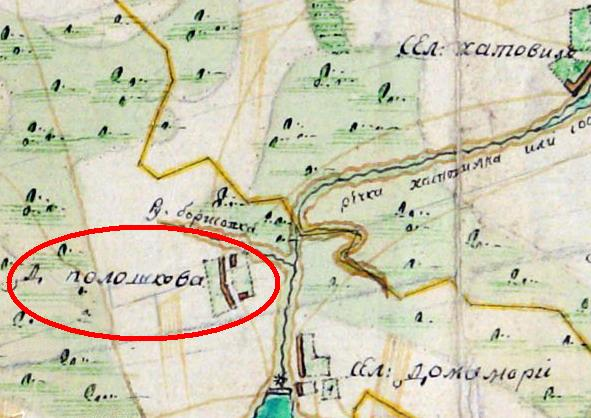
Village of Poloshkovo on an old Russian map (1783)

Poloshkovo was first mentioned in documents in 1712 as a village in the Krichev Starostwo in the eastern part of the Polish–Lithuanian Commonwealth. In 1772 these lands became a part of the Russian Empire. As of 1897, Poloshkovo's population was 513, there were 50 houses and a smithy. After the Russian Revolution of 1917 Poloshkovo was successively a part of the Soviet Russia (1917–1918), the Socialist Soviet Republic of Byelorussia (1919), the Russian Soviet Federative Socialist Republic (1919–1924), the Byelorussian Soviet Socialist Republic (since March 1924). In 1931 during the forced collectivization campaign 28 peasant families organized the collective farm. Also in 1930's some of Poloshkovo's natives (for example, orthodox priests) were subjected to repressions. During World War II the village was occupied by German troops from August 1941 to September 1943 and suffered greatly, a lot of wooden houses burnt in fire. Poloshkovo was liberated by the Red Army on September 28, 1943. In the second half of the 20th century young people started leaving the village for the towns and the cities.

== Current status ==
In February 2010, the village of Poloshkovo changed its status to agrotown. Hereby Poloshkovo represents a modern inhabited locality with wooden and brick houses. There is a school, a library, a post office, and a shop. Most residents are employed in the agricultural sector.

== Notable inhabitants ==
The most known native of Poloshkovo is Daniil Tomashov (1875 — 1926), a soviet luthier. He worked in Kyiv, Saint Petersburg and Moscow, making different string instruments. Tomashov died in Moscow.

== Bibliography ==
- Палошкава // Гарады і вёскі Беларусі: Энцыклапедыя. Т. 6, кн. 2. Магілёўская вобласць / рэдкал.: Т.У.Бялова і інш. — Мінск : БелЭн, 2009. — 592 с.: іл. ISBN 978-985-11-0440-2. С. 122–123.
