= Lobzha rural council =

Lobzha rural council (Belarusian: Лабжанскі сельсавет, Russian: Лобжанский сельсовет) is a lower-level subdivision (selsoviet) of Klimavichy district, Mogilev region, Belarus. Its capital is the village of Lobzha. According to the 2019 Belarus census, its population was 813.
