= Stary Dzyedzin =

Stary Dzyedzin Стары Дзедзін (Belarusian) Старый Дедин (Russian)
- Village
- Location within Belarus
- Coordinates: 53°45′49″N 32°05′14″E
- Country: Belarus
- Region: Mogilev Region
- District: Klimavichy District
- First mentioned: 16th century

Population (2010)
  - Total: 200
- Time zone: UTC+3 (MSK)

Stary Dzyedzin (Belarusian: Стары Дзедзін; Russian: Старый Дедин, romanized: Stary Dedin) is a village in Klimavichy District, Mogilev Region, Belarus. It is part of Kisyalyova Buda selsoviet. It is situated on the right bank of the Ostyor River, a left tributary of the Sozh River, five kilometres (3.1 mi) north of the Ivatsevichy–Babruysk–Krychaw (P43) highway which leads to the Belarus-Russia border.

== Etymology ==
According to local legend, the first settler of the area was an old man (Belarusian: дзед, romanized: dzyed) who lived for 125 years. Hence, "Dzyedzin" comes from the word "dzyed". Other sources say that the name comes from the word "dzyedzina", used in the Middle Ages to mean a type of feudal household that was transferred from the grandfather (Belarusian: дзед, romanized: dzyed) to the grandson. Thus "dzyedzina" literally means "grandfather's". Initially, the village was the center of an estate that included several nearby villages.

Later, another village with the same name was founded nearby and people began to call them Stary (Old) Dzyedzin and Novy (New) Dzeydzin, names which remain to this day.

== History ==
Archeological investigations discovered that the first settlements in the area took place in the Paleolithic. Several thousand years ago, the territory was inhabited by Finnic peoples, which is evident from the name of the Ostyor River, which has Finnic origins. The first Indo-Europeans in the area arrived approximately in the 2nd millennium BC, probably from the south, going up the Dnieper, the Sozh River, and their tributaries. Those people were the ancestors of modern Baltic people. The first Slavic people in the area, the Radimichs, came from the south as well, in the 8th-9th centuries. In the nearby area, traces of the Krivichs, another Slavic tribal union which lived to the north, have also been found. This demonstrates that the area was a mixed ethnic zone. Archeological investigations in 1926 of several tumuli (kurgans) near the village discovered Radimichs’ burial sites from the 10th-13th centuries.

Dzyedzin's treasure buried in late 10th century can be considered as evidence that a settlement existed on this place at those times but that it was not necessarily a predecessor of Stary Dzyedzin itself. Nevertheless, 985 was taken as a symbolic date of its foundation. In August 2010, the 1025th anniversary of the village was celebrated. A settlement under the name "Dzyedzin" was first mentioned in documents from the 16th century. Archeologists discovered the traces of houses that were built in 14th-18th centuries.

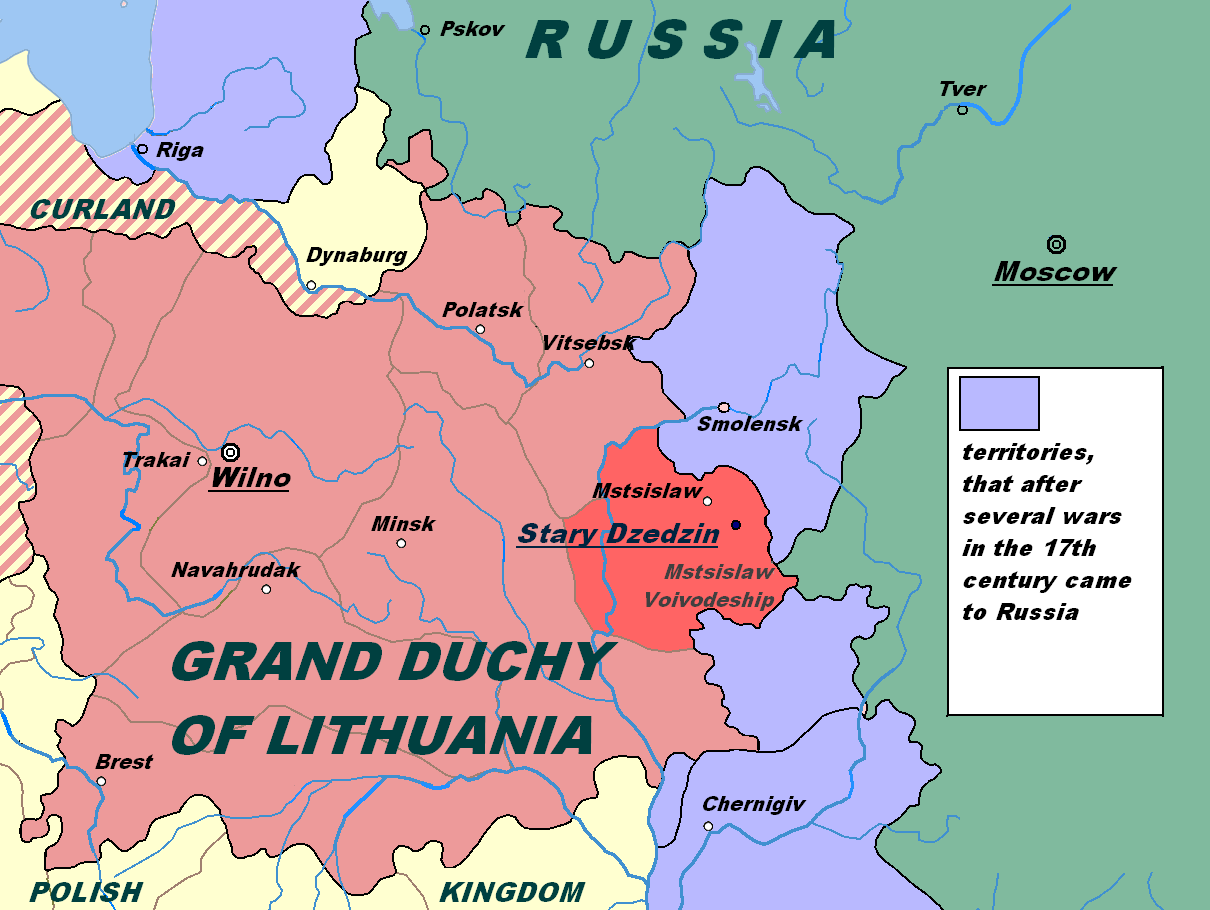
Stary Dzyedzin on the political map of the 17th–18th centuries

In the 12th-14th centuries, the area belonged to the Principality of Smolensk. In the 14th century, it became a part of the Grand Duchy of Lithuania, which was later included in the Mścisław Voivodeship. At the time of Muscovite-Lithuanian Wars, it was situated near the front lines and suffered from the wars over the next two centuries. In 1740–1744, Stary Dzyedzin was likely invaded by the Krychaw peasant rebellion under Vasil Vashchyla.

Stary Dzyedzin became part of the Russian Empire after the first partition of Polish-Lithuanian Commonwealth in 1772. At the time of the First World War and the Soviet-Polish War, the village was located near the front lines, but was not directly affected by either conflicts.

Stary Dzyedzin became part of the Byelorussian Soviet Socialist Republic in 1924, after the first enlargement of the territory of the republic.

During World War II, the village was occupied by German troops in early August 1941 and liberated in late September 1943. 138 inhabitants of Dzyedzin died during World War II.

== Culture ==
The natives from the village conserve centuries-old traditions. For forty years, Halina Brykava has led a folk ensemble "Astranka" (Belarusian: Астранка), named after the Ostyor river. Its participants collect local folksongs and perform them. Scholars from the Leningrad University came several times to listen to and record the folksongs.

Stary Dzyedzin is known for its ancient ritual of claiming for rain. When the weather is very dry, the women "plough" the Ostyor River and sing special songs that are dedicated to claim for the spirit of rain. The ritual has pagan roots.

Stary Dzyedzin is additionally known for its tradition of pottery and weaving, continued by Vera Tserentsievna Stalyarov.

== Treasure of Stary Dzyedzin ==
Stary Dzyedzin became famous after one of the oldest monetary treasures on the territory of Belarus was found.

In 1926, a peasant named Traphim Hudkou found a pot full of ancient coins while working on his land. Ales and Pavel Prudnikau wrote an article in the newspaper "Belarusian village" about it. Researchers decided to explore it and the treasure was subsequently sent to Minsk. After analysis, it was concluded that the treasure was buried between 980 and 985, and contained 204 ancient coins: 201 Kufic dirhams, with 2 German denarii and 1 miliaresion among them. Dirhams were printed in Antioch, Baghdad, Hamedan, Isfahan, Balkh, Samarkand, Bukhara and other places. This treasure likely belonged to a rich merchant, and was buried here in the secret place because this area could be a collateral line of the trade route from the Varangians to the Greeks.

The treasure was kept in the Belarusian State Museum, but was lost during the Second World War. In 2010, a memorial sign about Dzyedzin's treasure was erected in Dzyedzin.

== Notable people ==
- Ivan Dzemidzenka, doctor of veterinary medicine, professor, honoured scientist of BSSR
- Mikalay Kavalyow, doctor of veterinary medicine, professor
- Lidziya Kirpichenka, honoured teacher of BSSR
- Vital Makhanko, ingeneur-constructor of rockets of the S.P. Korolev Rocket and Space Corporation Energia
- Ales Prudnikau, Belarusian poet
- Pavel Prudnikau, Belarusian poet, honoured worker of culture of the Republic of Belarus
