= Husarka rural council =

Husarka rural council (Belarusian: Гусаркаўскі сельсавет, Russian: Гусарковский сельсовет) is a lower-level subdivision (selsoviet) of Klimavichy district, Mogilev region, Belarus. Its capital is the village of Husarka. According to the 2019 Belarusian census, its population was 813.
