= Ales Prudnikau =

Belarusian poet

Ales Prudnikau Алесь Пруднікаў
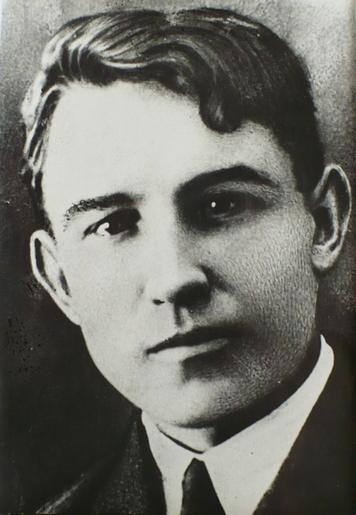
- Ales Prudnikau
- Born: Alyaksandr Traphimavich Prudnikau (Belarusian: Аляксандр Трафімавіч Пруднікаў); April 14 [O.S. 1] 1910 village Stary Dzedzin, Klimavichy pavet/uyezd of the Mogilev Governance, the Russian Empire now Klimovichy raion/district of the Mahilyow Voblast, the Republic of Belarus
- Died: August 5, 1941 village Utuki, the Kondopoga raion of the Karelo-Finnish Soviet Socialist Republic
- Occupation: Poet
- Writing career
- Period: 1926-1941

Ales Prudnikau (April 14, 1910 – August 5, 1941) was a Belarusian poet. He was a cousin of another Belarusian writer, Pavel Prudnikau.

== Biography ==
Ales Prudnikau was born into a peasant family. His father Traphim was called to the front at the time of World War I. He was badly injured and died soon after. Because of the unstable situation Ales couldn't find a constant place to study for a long time. In 1924-1930 he was studying in the seven-years school in the village Miloslavicy. In 1930 he worked on the building of the railway Asipovichy - Mahilyow - Roslavl, then in 1931 he worked in Minsk (in editory, in Belarusian Telegraph Agency). In 1932-1933 he was studying at the creative department of the Minsk pedagogical institute. In March 1933 he was arrested but after eight months was liberated and was called up to the Red Army, where he served until 1935. In 1935-1936 he worked on the local Klimovichy newspaper "Kamuna". In 1938 he graduated from the Leningrad pedagogical institute. He worked as the teacher, then as inspector of the Petrovo (now Kondopoga) raion of Karelian ASSR (in 1940-1956 - the Karelo-Finnish Soviet Socialist Republic), at the same time was studying at the philological faculty of the Karelian University. Since the first days of the German invasion of the Soviet Union, he was an intelligence operator at the front.

He was killed on August 5, 1941, near the village Utuki of Kondopoga raion. He was rehabilitated in 1956.

== Creative activity ==
Ales Prudnikau began his creative activity as a school poet together with his cousin Pavel Prudnikau in 1926. The time of his studying coincided with the process of belarusization in BSSR, so it he began to write his verses in Belarusian. At the same time he was an informal correspondent for some newspapers. For example, after a treasure of ancient coins had been found in the village Stary Dzedzin, he wrote a report to the newspaper "Belarusian village" (Belarusian: "Беларуская вёска") together with Pavel. (For more information, look an article Stary Dzedzin). His first verses were published in 1930. In 1932 he wrote a poem "Stars of the Earth" (Belarusian: "Зямныя зоры") which was published as a book where he told about buildings of the first five-year plan. Some of his verses were published in the book "With the Blood of the Heart" (Belarusian: "Крывёю сэрца", 1967).

== Editions of works ==
- Пруднікаў, А. Зямныя зоры / Алесь Пруднікаў. - Мн., Дзяржаўнае выдавецтва Беларусі, 1932. (Bel.)
- Крывёю сэрца / укладальнік А. Вялюгін. - Мн., Беларусь, 1967. С. 116-122. (Bel.)

== Literature ==
- Беларуская энцыклапедыя: У 18 т. Т. 13. - Мн.: БелЭн, 2001. - С. 48.Беларуская энцыклапедыя: У 18 т. Т. 13: Праміле - Рэлаксін/ Рэдкал.: Г. П. Пашкоў і інш. - Мн.: БелЭн, 2001. - 576 с.: іл. - С. 48.
- Беларускія пісьменнікі (1917–1990): Даведнік / Склад. А. К. Гардзінскі; Нав. рэд. А. Л. Верабей. - Мн., Маст. літ., 1994. - С. 441-442.
- Маракоў Л. Рэпрэсаваныя літаратары, навукоўцы, работнікі асветы, грамадскія і культурныя дзеячы Беларусі. 1794-1991. Том II. С. 159-160.
- Памяць: Гіст.-дакум. хроніка Клімавіцк. р-на. - Мн.: Універсітэцкае, 1995. - 645 с.: іл. - С. 624.
- Пруднікаў П. Далёкае, але не забытае: Успаміны. - Мн., Маст. літ., 1988. - 175 с. - С. 149-154.

== See also ==
Pavel Prudnikau
