= Damamerychy rural council =

Damamerychy rural council (Belarusian: Дамамерыцкі сельсавет, Russian: Домамеричский сельсовет) is a lower-level subdivision (selsoviet) of Klimavichy district, Mogilev region, Belarus. According to the 2019 Belarusian census, its population was 1,269.
