= Pavel Prudnikau =

Belarusian writer (1911–2000)

Pavel Prudnikau Belarusian: Павел Пруднікаў Russian: Павел Прудников
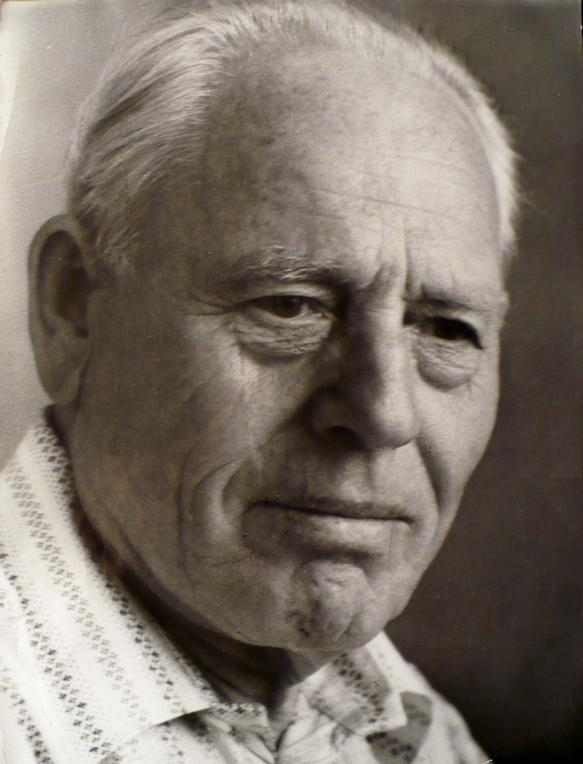
- Born: Pavel Ivanavich Prudnikau (Belarusian: Павел Іванавіч Пруднікаў); 14 July [O.S. 1 July] 1911 village Stary Dzedzin, Klimovichskiy Uyezd, Mogilev Governorate, Russian Empire now Klimavichy District, Mogilev Region, Belarus
- Died: March 16, 2000 (aged 88); Minsk, the Republic of Belarus
- Occupations: Poet and writer
- Writing career
- Pen name: Pauluk Buravey Belarusian: Паўлюк Буравей (in 1930s)
- Period: 1930–2000

Pavel Ivanovich Prudnikau (July 14, 1911 – March 16, 2000) was a Belarusian writer. He was a cousin of another Belarusian writer, Ales Prudnikau.

== Early years and the first steps of activity in literature ==
Pavel Prudnikau was born into a large peasant family. Hard events took place at the time of his childhood: World War I (1914–1918), an establishing of new communist system, the Russian Civil War and the Soviet-Polish War. Due to the geographical position of the village Stary Dedin, the battlefields didn't touch it but in 1918–1920 the village was situated near the front-line area. Because of it all the neighbouring schools were closed and Pavel had to wait for the appearance of the permanent place for studying. Only in 1930 he graduated from the seven-years school in the village Miloslavicy.

In 1924 he felt an aspiration for the literary work and created his first verse "A trip" (Belarusian: "Трапінка"). The time of his studying coincided with the process of belarusization in BSSR, so it determined that he began creating his verses in Belarusian. Two years later he and his cousin Ales' Prudnikau became local school poets. At the same time he tried himself as the correspondent of different republican newspapers. For example, after a treasure of ancient coins had been found in the village Stary Dzedzin, he has written a report to the newspaper "Belarusian village" (Belarusian: "Беларуская вёска") together with Ales. (For more information, look an article Stary Dzedzin).

== Life and creative work in the 1930s ==
At the beginning of the 1930s he often had to change the places of work. After graduating from the school he went to Donbas but soon returned. Then he worked in Mogilev on the building of the silk fabric. Then he lived in Minsk with Ales Prudnikov but worked as the loader on the railway station "Minsk-Tovarnaya". Several times he tried himself as the actor but gave up each time. Also was a correspondent of different republican newspapers, worked at the Belarusian radio.

In summer of 1930 Pavel's verse "Na vakacyi" was published in the republican newspaper "Pioneer of Belarus". This event was considered by him as the beginning of his professional literary career. In 1930 a column of his verses was published in the newspaper "Chyrvonaya zmena" that later became a foundation of his future first book "Songs of loaders" (Belarusian: "Песні грузчыкаў") (1932, co-authorship with Y. Subach). His first poem "Picket after picket" (Belarusian: "Пікет за пікетам") was written in 1931. In the 1930s he used a pen-name Paulyuk Buravey (Belarusian: "Паўлюк Буравей") to escape confusion with Ales Prudnikov. At the time of working in Minsk he became acquainted with many famous Belarusian writers and poets such as Yanka Kupala, Yakub Kolas, Mihas Charot, Platon Halavach and others. The memoirs about them formed the foundation of the book "Distant, but not forgotten" (Belarusian: "Далёкае, але не забытае", 1988) and other works.

In 1932 Pavel was accepted into the creative department of the Minsk Pedagogical Institute but soon gave it up. In 1932 he came to Leningrad where he entered the Leningrad Institute of foreign languages, and the following year became the student of the Leningrad Pedagogical Institute after Pokrovsky (Bubnov). He established contacts with Belarusian section of Leningrad department of the USSR Union of Writers. After the offer of professor Pushkarevich in 1937 was sent to post-graduate studying of the Slavic languages, but didn't begin studying because he was arrested at 11 August 1937.

== In GULAG and first decades after discharge ==
Pavel Prudnikov was kept in Kresty Prison for several months. Officially he was accused in Kirov's assassination of 1934. He stood the interrogation and was sentenced to eight years in prison. At first he was sent to the Buryat ASSR. In 1938 he attempted suicide by drowning in the Selenge River but was dissuaded by his friend, also prisoner, Mikola Kaneusky. In Gulag worked on building of railway lines in Buryat ASSR and Omsk Oblast, on building of tyre plant in Omsk and mining and smelting plant in Norilsk, as loader in port of Yeniseysk (Krasnoyarsk Krai).

After the end of imprisonment term he had to work as turner in railway depot in Norilsk, then as the chief of library of technical secondary school. After returning to native land (1946) worked as a teacher in the Smolensk oblast of the RSFSR. There he met his future wife Ann. But he couldn't stay there for long because of the danger of arrest. Pavel and his family had to move from one place to another looking for the most safe one. At this time two daughters were born: Olga and Nina.

In 1952 they stopped in Braslaw District of Vitebsk Region, in Slobodka village. This was the first time they were practically without means for life. Then Pavel began to work as a teacher of the Russian language, literature and history and his wife Ann as teacher in primary school. In January 1956, after the death of Joseph Stalin, he was rehabilitated. He began to publish his verses again since 1959 and returned to full literary work. In 1968 his second book "The time of my birth" (Belarusian: "Час майго нараджэння") was published.

== Late literary activity ==
In 1968–1969 Pavel and his family moved to Minsk. From 1968–1971 he worked as editor of the magazine "Consumer services of Belarus" (Belarusian: "Служба быту Беларусі"). Retirement in 1971 gave him an opportunity to spend much more time to literary work, and this period of activity was the most fruitful. In 1971 he became a member of the BSSR Union of Writers.

From 1970 into the 1980s he issued several collected verses. The book of selected works "My highway" (1981) was the most prominent one among them. The verses contain themes of native Mahilyow region, the beauty of Braslaw region, the reminiscence about his trip to Siberia, to the places of his former imprisonment, about his trips to Czechoslovakia, to Caucasus. In 1987 a book for children "Daybreak" (Belarusian: "Заранка") was published. In 1988 he issued the book of memoirs "Distant, but not forgotten" (Belarusian: "Далёкае, але не забытае"), where he described his meetings with different Belarusian writers, from Zmicier Zhylunovich, a writer and the first head of government of Socialist Soviet Republic of Byelorussia, to Ivan Melezh.

== Theme of Stalin's repressions in the works ==
After the beginning of Perestroika an opportunity to write about forbidden things, such as Stalin's repressions, appeared. Since the 1950s, since the time of Khrushchev Thaw, Pavel Prudnikov had an idea to write about those awful events that he was witness of and began to make first notes. But the real opportunity to publish them appeared only 30 years later. First work of this type was the poem "Taymyr" (Belarusian: "Таймыр", 1989).

In 1993 a new book "Beyond the Barbed Wire" (Belarusian: "За калючым дротам") was published that consisted of two stories: "Yezhov's Mittens" (Belarusian: "Яжовыя рукавіцы") and "A Northern Hell" (Belarusian: "Пекла"). Stories are of an autobiographical character, the major hero is Mihas Ascyorsky, whose destiny resembles the destiny of the author. The first story is about Mihas's suffering in Kresty Prison; the second story is about the imprisonment of Mihas in Siberia. All the episodes in the book describe the real events. In 1996 the last book of verses "Parosha" (Belarusian: "Пароша") was published, where the poem "Each Second" (Belarusian: "Кожны другі") was put in. This poem was also devoted to the victims of Stalin's repressions.

== The last years of life and unrealized plans ==
In the last years of life Pavel Prudnikov suffered a great deal from diseases that deprived him of an opportunity to write the new works on paper at all. But he didn't stop his literary work and dictated new verses to his nearest relatives.

In 1998 a Belarusian writer Leanid Marakou who was looking for information about victims of Stalin's repressions turned to Pavel Prudnikov to accept memoirs about Belarusian writer Valery Marakou, the uncle of Leanid, who was also among those victims. Pavel had a plan to publish a story "Disgrace" (Belarusian: "Апала") that was considered as continuation of two stories about Mihas Ascyorsky. The author planned to raise a difficult theme of returning of former prisoners from Gulag and to tell about his sufferings after the discharge but it wasn't realized. A lot of verses, a poem devoted to the Chernobyl disaster, memoirs about kollektivization of the 1930s ("Unhealed Wounds", Belarusian: "Незагойныя раны") and new memoirs about Belarusian poets ("Is not erased from memory", Belarusian: "З памяці не сцёрлася") remained unpublished. Pavel had a plan to edit a book of his selected works under the title "Echo" (Belarusian: "Водгулле") but illness prevented from the implementation of it.

== Significance of works ==
Pavel Prudnikau created a lot of works: verses, poems, novels, memoirs, verses for children.

His works of the 1930s are typical for that time. The verses contain a glorifying of working enthusiasm, work slogans. In the late period Pavel was worried about moving of society to the new stages. Thinking of life tied with singing of his native land and thinking of its past took a prominent place in his literary heritage. He was one of the first to write about the beauty of the Braslaw region.

The most prominent is a cycle of works devoted to the horrors of Stalin's repressions. These works are the most famous on this theme in Belarusian literature. He often put stories about it in the form of verses (poems "Taymyr", "Each Second", a cycle of verses "Aching Memoirs" (Belarusian: "Балючая памяць")). These poems and stories describe real events that the author witnessed.

Due to the fact that Pavel Prudnikau began his literary activity in the inter-war period, he had contacts with poets and writers of different epochs. This rich experience was implemented in the books of memoirs "Distant but not forgotten". A great part of it is dedicated to memoirs about young Belarusian poets and writers of the 1930s who died at the time of World War II or the Great Purge in USSR in 1937: Zmitro Vitalin, Zmitrok Astapenka, Todar Klyashtorny, Mihas Zarecky and others. Belarusian-Soviet composer Yury Semyanyaka wrote music for songs on the basis of Prudnikau's verses "Pershamayskaya" and "U Pakhody".

== Materials in archives and museums ==
Now the documents devoted to the life and activity of Pavel Prudnikau can be found in the Belarusian State Archive-Museum of Literature and Art in Minsk. Special expositions are contained in the museums of Klimavichy and Braslaw.

Unfortunately there are no translations of Prudnikau's works into English.

== Awards ==
In 1992 by decree (ukase) of the Supreme Soviet of Belarus he was honoured with the title of Meritorious Worker of Culture of the Republic of Belarus". In 1995 Pavel Prudnikau was awarded for his book "Beyond the Barbed Wire" with the prime of the Federation of Trade Unions of Belarus.

== Works ==
- Песні грузчыкаў: Вершы. — Мн., Белдзяржвыд, 1932. (у сааўтарстве з Я. Субачом)
- Час майго нараджэння. Вершы. - Мн., Беларусь, 1968. - 112 с.
- Далёкае і блізкае // Вытокі песні. Аўтабіяграфіі беларускіх пісьменнікаў. Мн., Маст. літ., 1973. - 336 с., іл.
- Прысады: Вершы. - Мн., Маст. літ., 1979. - 80 с., іл.
- Мая магістраль: Выбранае. Вершы, успаміны. - Мн., Маст. літ., 1981. - 239 с., 1 л. партр.
- Заасцёр'е: Вершы, паэма. - Мн., Маст. літ., 1986. - 126 с., іл.
- Заранка: Вершы: Для сярэд. шк. узросту / Маст. М. Д. Рыжы. - Мн., Юнацтва, 1987. - 71 с., іл.
- Далёкае, але не забытае: Успаміны. - Мн., Маст. літ., 1988. - 175 с.
- Познія ягады: Вершы, паэмы. - Мн., Маст. літ., 1990. - 158 с.
- Крыніцы: Выбранае: Вершы і паэмы / Прадм. А. Марціновіча. - Мн., Маст. літ., 1991. - 334 с., іл.
- Па знаёмых пякучых сцежках // Правда истории: память и боль / Сост. Н. М. Жилинский. - Мн., Беларусь, 1991. - 432 с., [4] л., илл.
- За калючым дротам: Аповесці. - Мн., Маст. літ., 1993. - 272 с.
- Пароша: Вершы. Паэма-аповесць. - Мн., Маст. літ., 1996. - 142 с., іл.

== Literature ==
- Беларускія пісьменнікі (1917–1990): Даведнік / Склад. А. К. Гардзінскі; Нав. рэд. А. Л. Верабей. - Мн., Маст. літ., 1994. - С. 442–443.
- Кобрын У. Не стукайся, старасць, у дзверы // Мінская праўда. 1981, 15 ліп.
- Маракоў Л. Пад страхам усё жыццё // Голас Радзімы. 1999. 29 снеж.
- Маракоў Л. Рэпрэсаваныя літаратары, навукоўцы, работнікі асветы, грамадскія і культурныя дзеячы Беларусі. 1794–1991. Том II. С. 160–161.
- Снегін В. «Нягучная песня мая…» // Чырвоная змена. 1981, 14 ліп.
- Старавыбарны П. Голас сэрца // Настаўніцкая газета. 1971, 7 ліп.

== See also ==
- Ales Prudnikau
- Norillag - Internet sources (in Russian)
- Krasnoyarsk society "Memorial". Materials about Norilsk camps (Norillag) (in Russian)
