= Milaslavichy rural council =

Milaslavichy rural council (Belarusian: Мілаславіцкі сельсавет, Russian: Милославичский сельсовет) is a lower-level subdivision (selsoviet) of Klimavichy district, Mogilev region, Belarus. According to the 2019 Belarus census, its population was 918.
