= Rodnya rural council =

Rodnya rural council (Belarusian: Родненскі сельсавет, Russian: Родненский сельсовет) is a lower-level subdivision (selsoviet) of Klimavichy district, Mogilev region, Belarus. According to the 2019 Belarus census, its population was 1,239.
