= Tsimanava rural council =

Tsimanava rural council (Belarusian: Ціманаўскі сельсавет, Russian: Тимоновский сельсовет) is a lower-level subdivision (selsoviet) of Klimavichy district, Mogilev region, Belarus. According to the 2019 Belarus census, its population was 2,065.
