= 82nd Rifle Division (1942–1945) =

- Active: 1st formation: 1939–1940; 2nd formation: 1942–1945
- Country: Soviet Union
- Branch: Red Army
- Type: Infantry

Commanders
- Notable commanders: Ivan Fedyuninsky (6 February – 3 March 1940)

The 82nd Rifle Division was an infantry division of the Red Army which was formed twice. The first creation existed between 1939–1940, and it was formed again during World War II, when it existed between 17 June 1942 and 29 May 1945.

== First formation ==
The 82nd Infantry Division was first formed in Perm in May 1939 and transferred to the Trans-Baikal Military District in June 1939. The Division participated in the Battles of Khalkhin Gol. On 10 March 10, 1940 the division was reorganized into the 82nd Motor Rifle Division and in March 1941, into the 82nd Motorized Division.

== Second formation ==
On 17 June 1942, a new 82nd Rifle Division was formed on the basis of the 64th Marine Rifle Brigade in the Tver Oblast.
The division participated in the Battle of Rzhev, Battle of Smolensk (1943), Operation Bagration, Bobruysk offensive, Baltic offensive, Riga offensive (1944), Vistula–Oder offensive and Battle of Berlin.

The division was disbanded on 29 May 1945.

== Sources ==
- Robert G. Poirier and Albert Z. Conner, The Red Army Order of Battle in the Great Patriotic War, Novato: Presidio Press, 1985. ISBN 0-89141-237-9.
- 82-я Ярцевская Краснознаменная стрелковая дивизия
- samsv.narod.ru
