= Klimavichy =

Town in Mogilev Region, Belarus

Klimavichy Клiмавiчы (Belarusian) Климовичи (Russian)
- Town
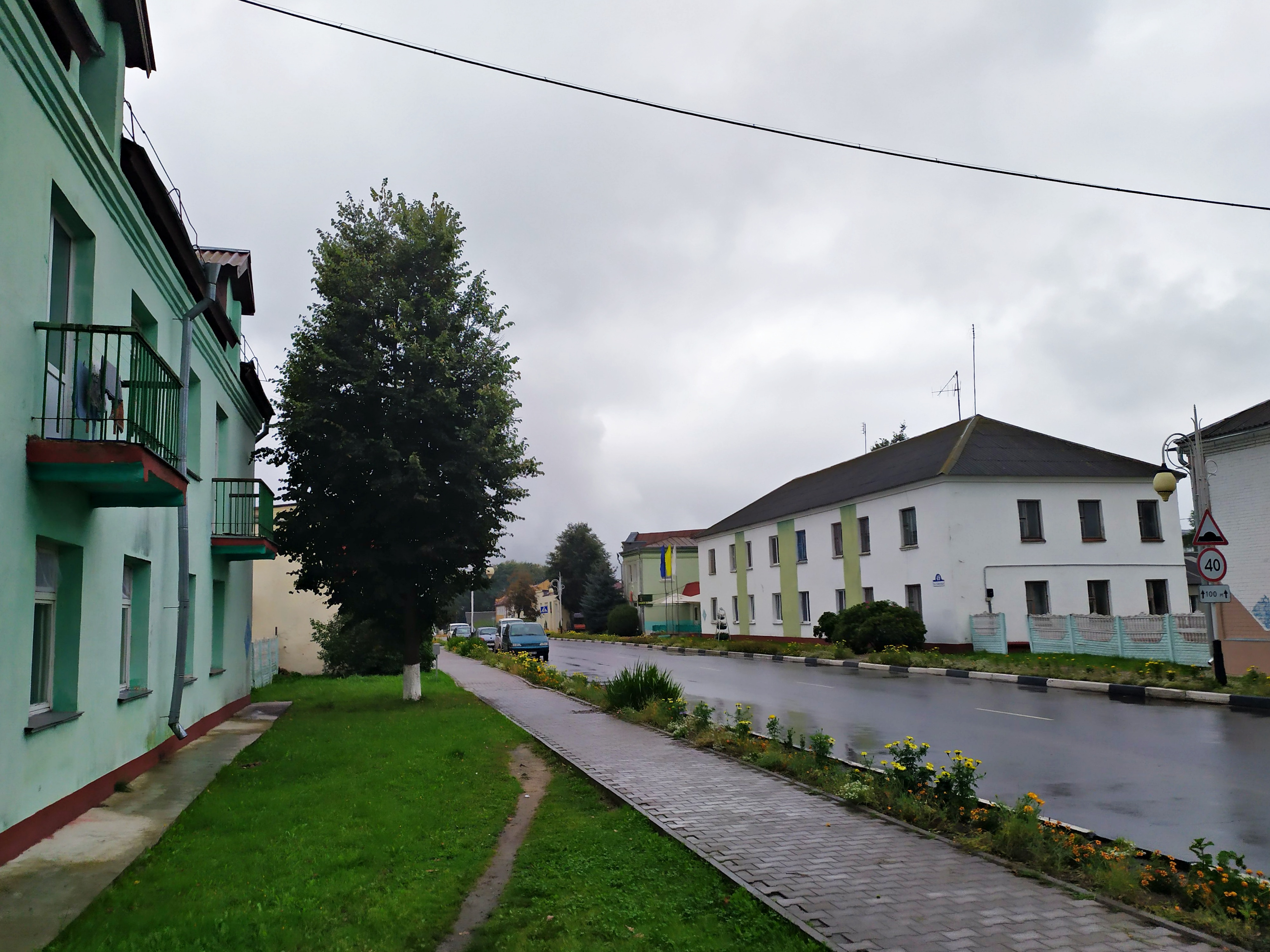
- A typical street of Klimavichy

- Flag Coat of arms

- Location within Belarus
- Coordinates: 53°37′N 31°57′E
- Country: Belarus
- Region: Mogilev Region
- District: Klimavichy District

Population (2025)
  - Total: 14,868
- Time zone: UTC+3 (MSK)
- License plate: 6

Klimavichy (Belarusian: Клiмавiчы, romanized: Klimavičy; Russian: Климовичи, romanized: Klimovichi) is a town in Mogilev Region, Belarus. It serves as the administrative center of Klimavichy District. Klimavichy is located 124 km (77.05 mi) east of Mogilev on the bank of the Kalinica River. In 2009, its population was 17,064. As of 2025, it has a population of 14,868.

== History ==
Historical c.o.a. of Klimavichy

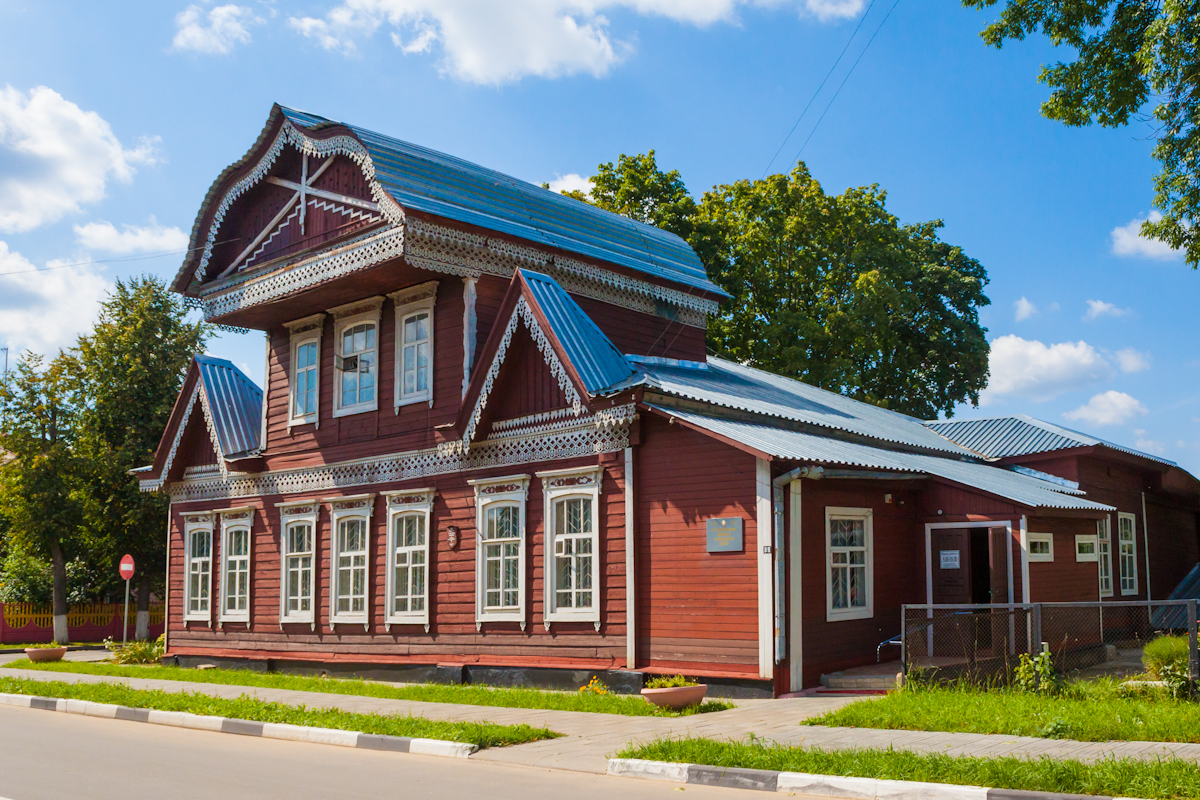
Historical wooden building

First references in historical documents are dated by 1581 in relation to Mścisław Voivodship of the Grand Duchy of Lithuania. It was granted city status in 1777, and a coat of arms in 1781. According to the census of 1897, the city had 4,714 inhabitants. 50.2 percent were Orthodox, 47.9 percent Jews and 1.5 percent Catholics.

=== World War II ===
It was occupied by Nazi Germany during World War II on August 10, 1941, and liberated in October 1943.

In January 1939, there were 1,693 Jews in the village. There was a Yiddish school until 1938. The majority of the Jews were merchants.

There were 4 executions of Jews in Klimovichi. At the end of August 1941, 13 Jews were arrested, taken to the Jewish cemetery in order to dig a pit. They were shot there afterwards. The second execution took place on November 6, 1941. Some Jews were sent to work and the remaining Jews were gathered in a garage near the hospital. Germans took their valuables. The Jews were then displaced near the airport, not far from the village of Dolgaya Gora and were shot by Germans and local policemen. On the same day, the Jews who were sent to work were shot at the same location. According to some sources, between 750 and 900 Jews were killed on that day. After this massacre, 80 Jews remained alive. They were concentrated in one house. At the end of November 1941, these Jews were forced to walk to Melovaya Gora, in the area of the town near the Lazhbanka River, and were shot. Some of those in the shooting were able to escape and run away. In April 1943, the children from mixed-families were imprisoned by the Germans and were shot on April 12, 1943.
