= Klimavichy district =

District of Mogilev region, Belarus

Coordinates: 53°37′N 31°57′E

Klimavichy district Клімавіцкі раён (Belarusian) Климовичский район (Russian)
- District
- Flag Coat of arms

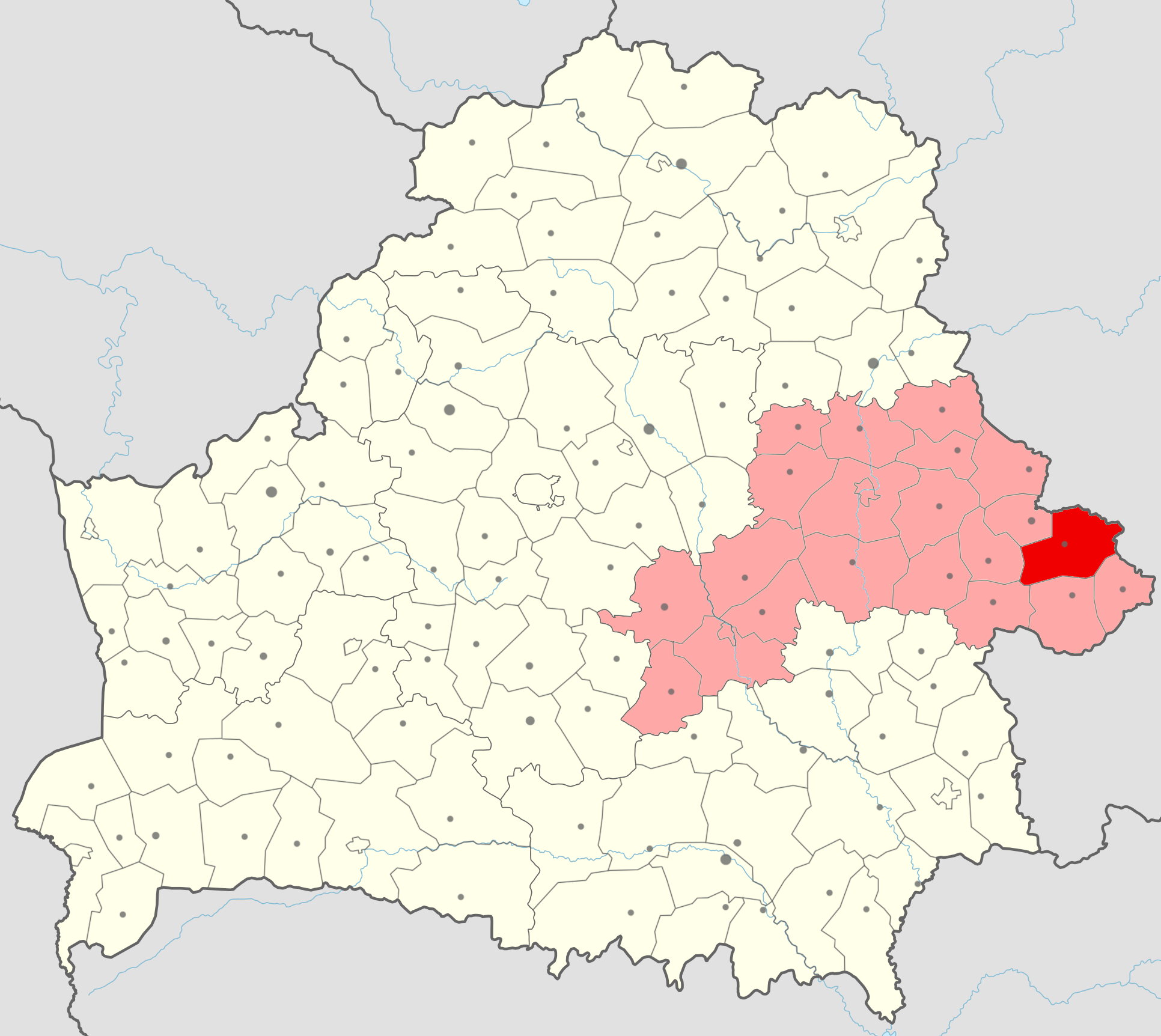
- Country: Belarus
- Region: Mogilev region
- Administrative center: Klimavichy

Area
  - Total: 1,542.78 km^{2} (595.67 sq mi)

Population (2023)
  - Total: 22,433
  - Density: 14.541/km^{2} (37.660/sq mi)
- Time zone: UTC+3 (MSK)

Klimavichy district or Klimavičy district (Belarusian: Клімавіцкі раён; Russian: Климовичский район, romanized: Klimovichsky rayon) is a district (raion) of Mogilev region in Belarus. The administrative center is the town of Klimavichy. As of 2009, its population was 28,523. The population of Klimavichy accounts for 59.8% of the district's population.

== See also ==
- Paloshkava, Klimavichy district
