= Talitsa =

Talitsa (Russian: Талица) is the name of several inhabited localities in Russia and Belarus.

== Modern localities ==
=== Altai Krai ===
As of 2012, two rural localities in Altai Krai bear this name:

- Talitsa, Sovetsky District, Altai Krai, a selo in Talitsky Selsoviet of Sovetsky District; 52°24′N 85°40′E
- Talitsa, Zalesovsky District, Altai Krai, a selo in Bolshekaltaysky Selsoviet of Zalesovsky District; 54°6′N 84°19′E

=== Altai Republic ===
As of 2012, one rural locality in the Altai Republic bears this name:

- Talitsa, Altai Republic, a selo in Talitskoye Rural Settlement of Ust-Kansky District

=== Ivanovo Oblast ===
As of 2012, one rural locality in Ivanovo Oblast bears this name:

- Talitsa, Ivanovo Oblast, a selo in Yuryevetsky District

=== Kirov Oblast ===
As of 2012, two rural localities in Kirov Oblast bear this name:

- Talitsa, Falyonsky District, Kirov Oblast, a selo in Talitsky Rural Okrug of Falyonsky District; 58°1′N 51°31′E
- Talitsa, Zuyevsky District, Kirov Oblast, a settlement in Chepetsky Rural Okrug of Zuyevsky District; 58°34′N 51°12′E

=== Komi Republic ===
As of 2012, one rural locality in the Komi Republic bears this name:

- Talitsa, Komi Republic, a village in Guryevka Selo Administrative Territory of Priluzsky District; 59°27′N 49°34′E

=== Kostroma Oblast ===
As of 2012, three rural localities in Kostroma Oblast bear this name:

- Talitsa, Baranovskoye Settlement, Buysky District, Kostroma Oblast, a village in Baranovskoye Settlement of Buysky District; 58°32′N 41°39′E
- Talitsa, Tsentralnoye Settlement, Buysky District, Kostroma Oblast, a settlement in Tsentralnoye Settlement of Buysky District; 58°44′N 41°34′E
- Talitsa, Vokhomsky District, Kostroma Oblast, a settlement in Tikhonovskoye Settlement of Vokhomsky District; 59°25′N 46°44′E

=== Lipetsk Oblast ===
As of 2012, two rural localities in Lipetsk Oblast bear this name:

- Talitsa, Krasninsky District, Lipetsk Oblast, a village in Krasninsky Selsoviet of Krasninsky District; 52°54′N 38°44′E
- Talitsa, Yeletsky District, Lipetsk Oblast, a selo in Kolosovsky Selsoviet of Yeletsky District; 52°43′N 38°44′E

=== Nizhny Novgorod Oblast ===
As of 2012, one rural locality in Nizhny Novgorod Oblast bears this name:

- Talitsa, Nizhny Novgorod Oblast, a village in Gorevsky Selsoviet of Koverninsky District

=== Perm Krai ===
As of 2012, two rural localities in Perm Krai bear this name:

- Talitsa, Dobryanka, Perm Krai, a settlement under the administrative jurisdiction of the town of krai significance of Dobryanka
- Talitsa, Nytvensky District, Perm Krai, a village in Nytvensky District

=== Sverdlovsk Oblast ===
As of 2012, four inhabited localities in Sverdlovsk Oblast bear this name:

Urban localities

- Talitsa, Talitsky District, Sverdlovsk Oblast, a town in Talitsky District

Rural localities

- Talitsa, Nizhneserginsky District, Sverdlovsk Oblast, a village in Nizhneserginsky District
- Talitsa, Pyshminsky District, Sverdlovsk Oblast, a village in Pyshminsky District
- Talitsa, Sukholozhsky District, Sverdlovsk Oblast, a selo in Sukholozhsky District

=== Tver Oblast ===
As of 2012, two rural localities in Tver Oblast bear this name:

- Talitsa, Oleninsky District, Tver Oblast, a village in Grishinskoye Rural Settlement of Oleninsky District
- Talitsa, Toropetsky District, Tver Oblast, a village in Ponizovskoye Rural Settlement of Toropetsky District

=== Vologda Oblast ===
As of 2012, four rural localities in Vologda Oblast bear this name:

- Talitsa, Babushkinsky District, Vologda Oblast, a village in Velikodvorsky Selsoviet of Babushkinsky District
- Talitsa, Minkinsky Selsoviet, Gryazovetsky District, Vologda Oblast, a village in Minkinsky Selsoviet of Gryazovetsky District
- Talitsa, Rostilovsky Selsoviet, Gryazovetsky District, Vologda Oblast, a village in Rostilovsky Selsoviet of Gryazovetsky District
- Talitsa, Nikolsky District, Vologda Oblast, a village in Lobovsky Selsoviet of Nikolsky District

=== Yaroslavl Oblast ===
As of 2012, one rural locality in Yaroslavl Oblast bears this name:

- Talitsa, Yaroslavl Oblast, a village in Shopshinsky Rural Okrug of Gavrilov-Yamsky District

== Abolished localities ==
- Talitsa, Mezhevskoy District, Kostroma Oblast, a village in Georgiyevsky Selsoviet of Mezhevskoy District of Kostroma Oblast; abolished on October 6, 2004

== Alternative names ==
- Talitsa, alternative name of Rybopitomnik, a settlement in Ilyinsky Rural Okrug of Slobodskoy District in Kirov Oblast; 58°47′N 50°29′E
- Talitsa, alternative name of Bolshaya Talitsa, a village in Shangskoye Settlement of Sharyinsky District in Kostroma Oblast; 58°29′N 45°34′E

== Belarus ==
- Talitsa, Slutsk district
