= Druzhnaya =

Druzhnaya (Russian: Дружная) may refer to:

- Druzhnaya, Bryansk Oblast, a rural locality in Navlinsky District, Bryansk Oblast, Russia
- Druzhnaya, Perm Krai, a rural locality in Bryukhovskoye Rural Settlement, Yelovsky District, Perm Krai, Russia
- Druzhnaya, Vladimir Oblast, a rural locality in Styopantsevskoye Rural Settlement, Vyaznikovsky District, Vladimir Oblast, Russia
- Druzhnaya Station, any of the four Soviet (and later Russian) scientific stations in the Antarctica

== See also ==
- Druzhnaya Gorka
- Druzhny (disambiguation)
- Druzhnoye
