= Chaychytsy =

Chaychytsy Чайчыцы (Belarusian) Чайчицы (Russian)
- Village
- Location within Belarus
- Coordinates: 52°59′17″N 27°18′14″E
- Country: Belarus
- Region: Minsk Region
- District: Slutsk District

Population (1998)
  - Total: 1
- Time zone: UTC+3 (MSK)
- Postal code: 223627
- License plate: 5

Chaychytsy (Belarusian: Чайчыцы, romanized: Čajčycy; (Note: Official transliteration.) Russian: Чайчицы, romanized: Chaychitsy) is a village in Slutsk District, Minsk Region, Belarus. It is part of the Rachkavitski rural council (selsoviet).

In the 19th century, Chaychytsy was a zaścianek. Today, the village has few permanent residents and hosts several dachas of residents from the nearby town of Slutsk.
