= Druzhny =

Druzhny (Russian: Дружный) may refer to:

- Druzhny, Republic of Adygea, a settlement in the Republic of Adygea, Russia
- Druzhny, Minsk Region, a settlement in Minsk Region, Belarus
- USS Yarnall (DD-143), called Druzhny during its Soviet commission in 1944–1952

== See also ==
- Druzhnaya (disambiguation)
- Druzhnoye, Amur Oblast, Russia
