= Kazlovitski rural council =

Kazlovitski rural council is a lower-level subdivision (selsoviet) of Slutsk district, Minsk region, Belarus.
