= Butka =

Butka may refer to:

- Butka, Hungarian name of the village of Budkovce, Slovakia
- Butka, Russia, a rural locality (a selo) in Sverdlovsk Oblast; birthplace of Boris Yeltsin
