= Vyasyeyski rural council =

Rural councils of Belarus

Vyasyeyski rural council is a lower-level subdivision (selsoviet) of Slutsk district, Minsk region, Belarus.
