= Listopad =

Listopad (also spelt Listapad or Lystopad), is a common name for a month in autumn in various Slavic calendars, usually either October or November.

Listopad or Listapad may also refer to:

== Film ==
- Listapad, or Minsk International Film Festival, a film festival held each November in Minsk, Belarus
- Listopad (1992 film), a 1992 Polish film directed by Łukasz Karwowski
- Listopad (1935 film), a 1935 Czech film directed by Otakar Vávra

== People ==
- Jurka Listapad, a Belarusian dissident, a victim of Stalin's purges
- Ed Listopad (born 1929), American football player
- František Listopad (1921–2017), Czech writer
- Rafał Listopad (born 1978), Polish film editor
