= Pyareshyrski rural council =

Lower-level subdivision of Minsk region, Belarus

Pyarezhyrsky rural council is a lower-level subdivision (selsoviet) of Pukhavichy district, Minsk region, Belarus.
