= Syarazhski rural council =

Syarazhski rural council is a lower-level subdivision (selsoviet) of Slutsk district, Minsk region, Belarus.
