= Isyernski rural council =

Rural council of Belarus

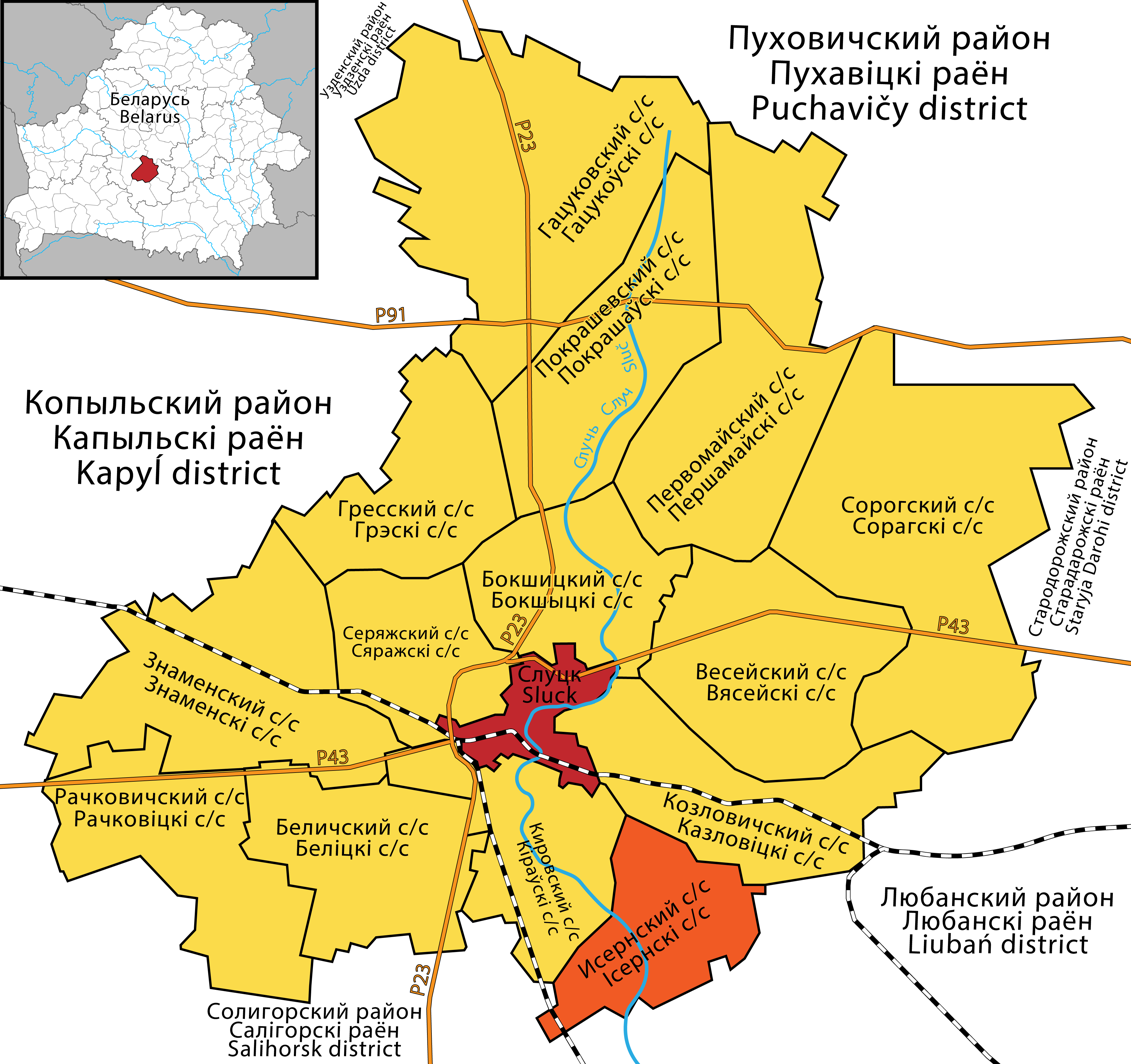
Isyernski rural council

Isyernski rural council is a lower-level subdivision (selsoviet) of Slutsk district, Minsk region, Belarus. Its administrative center is agrotown of Isyerna

== Rural localities ==
The populations are from the 2009 Belarusian census and 2019 Belarusian census

Russian Name	Belarusian Name	Pop. 2009	Pop. 2019
Великая Слива (Velikaya Sliva)	Вялікая Сліва (Vyalikaya Sliva)	623	573
Великий Быков	Вялікі Быкоў (Vyaliki Bykow)	156	109
Волоты	Валаты (Valaty)	12	2
Гуляево	Гуляева (Hylayayeva)	89	61
Исерно (Iserno)	Ісерна (Isyerna)	424	393
Паничи	Панічы (Panichy)	18	14
Калиновка	Калінаўка (Kalinawka)	16	15
Малиновка	Малінаўка(Malinawka)	8	8
Малый Быков	Малы Быкоў (Maly Bykow)	71	48
Нежевка	Нежаўка (Neshawka)	115	79
Новоселки	Навасёлкі (Navasyolki)	14	8
Исернский сельсовет	Ісернскі сельсавет	1546	1310
