= Liubou Uladykouskaja =

Cultural anthropologist

Luboŭ Uładykoŭskaja
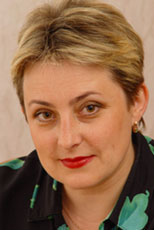
- Born: February 14, 1967 (age 59); Slutsk District, Minsk Region, Belarus
- Education: Belarusian State University
- Known for: Cultural anthropologist, public figure
- Children: 2

Luboŭ Uładykoŭskaja (Belarusian: Любоў Мікалаеўна Уладыкоўская; born February 14, 1967) is a cultural anthropologist and a Belarusian public figure. A founder and director general of the institution Intercultural Dialogue. A Fulbright Scholar (2014-2015, Florida University, United States)

== Life ==
Luboŭ Uładykoŭskaja was born in Slutsk District, Minsk Region, Belarus. In 1989 she graduated from the Belarusian State University and was awarded a PhD in Belarusian studies in 1993.

== Career ==
Working at the Ministry of Education and Science of the Republic of Belarus in 1994-1998 she supported the Belarusian language spreading at universities and national identity strengthening in opposition to authorities' tendency to integration with Russia. To prevent further Russification and develop the Belarusian terminology in different spheres, she initiated the Government Terminology Commission creation (1995). Her public activity was also aimed at Christianity values popularization, national revival, democratization, and returning Belarus into Europe.

In 1998–2004, Luboŭ Uładykoŭskaja was the head of the only state institution operated in Belarusian - the F. Skaryna National Scientific and Educational Center. Instead of ethnography which was the most popular part of the Belarusian studies she tried to develop Belarusian philosophy and interdisciplinary research based on the western schools. Her proposals for designing the strategy in national culture development were supported by UNESCO. In 2004 the authorities eliminated the F. Skaryna Center.

Since 2004 Uładykoŭskaja worked at the Belarusian State University and the National Academy of Sciences of Belarus. She argues that political freedom and national independence of the Belarusians are closely connected with getting rid of Soviet stereotypes in the mind and behavior, with the diminution of betrayal and servility among the elites as well as with return of Belarusians to their native cultural and language environment. Her public initiatives were aimed at preservation of cultural originality and intercultural dialogue development. According to Uładykoŭskaja, intercultural dialogue is a universal global value and a tool for democratization and deliverance from provincialism. Uładykoŭskaja founded the Intercultural Dialogue Centre under the Republican Confederation of Entrepreneurship in 2010 and the institution Intercultural Dialogue in 2012. Her "western focus" was criticized by Alexander Lukashenko's ideologists.

After visiting the US in 2008, Uładykoŭskaja concentrated on American studies development. In opposition to official propaganda she insists on objective information about US and American experience applying in Belarus. Her international project Belarusian-American Cultural Dialogue: Strategy for Development (2011-2012) received a broad public resonance. According to Uładykoŭskaja, "USA gives us a vivid example that nothing is given as hard and nothing brings such large dividends as Her Majesty Freedom. Freedom is not free, but if you do not have Freedom and do not fight for it, then what is the reason to live?"

== Private life ==
Luboŭ Uładykoŭskaja is a Сatholic. In 1990–2006, her surname has been Kanaplanik (Uładykoŭskaja-Kanaplanik). She is married and has two children.

== Main works ==
- America Through the Eyes of Belarusians (2018) In English. ISBN 978-6202199865.
- Spiritual Life of the Society and Globalization: How Belarusian Culture Has Been Transformed? (2017) In Belarusian. ISBN 978-985-586-036-6.
- Intercultural Dialogue: American Paradigm (2014) In Belarusian.
- Discovery of My America, Or Why Do the Belarusians Need the USA? (2012) In Belarusian. ISBN 978-985-463-492-0.
- How to Preserve Cultural Originality? (2010) In Belarusian.
- Spiritual Ideals in the Modern Belarusian Culture and Values of Globalism (2009) In Belarusian. ISBN 978-985-518-123-2.
- Water Colors of Love: Conception of the National Outlook (2000) In Belarusian.
