= Pershamayski rural council =

Pershamayski rural council is a lower-level subdivision (selsoviet) of Slutsk district, Minsk region, Belarus.
