= Dukorski rural council =

Dukorski rural council is a lower-level subdivision (selsoviet) of Pukhavichy district, Minsk region, Belarus.
