= Alyaksandr Krotaw =

Belarusian footballer

Personal information
- Date of birth: 19 April 1995 (age 31)
- Place of birth: Druzhny, Pukhavichy District, Minsk Oblast, Belarus
- Height: 1.72 m (5 ft 8 in)
- Position: Midfielder

Youth career
- BATE Borisov

Senior career*
Years	Team	Apps	(Gls)
2014–2018	Isloch Minsk Raion	44	(1)
2016	→ Torpedo Minsk (loan)	12	(0)
2017–2018	→ Belshina Bobruisk (loan)	32	(8)
2019	Rukh Brest	6	(2)
2019	Underdog Chist	13	(6)
2020	Oshmyany	21	(2)
2021	Naftan Novopolotsk	28	(2)
2022	Lida	21	(2)
2023–2024	Molodechno	43	(4)
2024–2026	Unixlabs Minsk	51	(3)

International career
2014	Belarus U21	4	(1)
- * Club domestic league appearances and goals as of 1 September 2026

Alyaksandr Krotaw (Belarusian: Аляксандр Кротаў; Russian: Александр Кротов; born 19 April 1995) is a Belarusian professional footballer.
