= Navasyolkawski rural council =

Navasyolkawski rural council is a lower-level subdivision (selsoviet) of Pukhavichy district, Minsk region, Belarus.
