= Pukhavicki rural council =

Pukhavicki rural council is a lower-level subdivision (selsoviet) of Pukhavichy district, Minsk region, Belarus.
