= Hatsukowski rural council =

Hatsukowski rural council is a lower-level subdivision (selsoviet) of Slutsk district, Minsk region, Belarus.
