= Znamyenski rural council =

Rural councils of Belarus

Znamyenski rural council is a lower-level subdivision (selsoviet) of Slutsk district, Minsk region, Belarus.
