= Uladzimier Teraŭski =

Belarusian composer

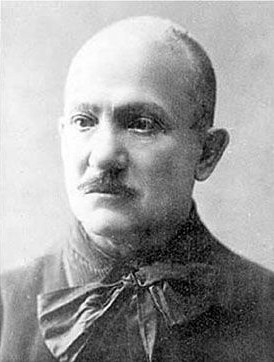
- Uladzimier Teraŭski
- Born: Уладзімер Тэраўскі; 11 November 1871; Ramanaŭ village, Slutsky Uyezd, Minsk Governorate (currently known as the village of Lenin in the Slutsk District, Minsk region of Belarus)
- Died: 10 November 1938 (aged 66); Minsk
- Occupations: composer, choirmaster
- Notable work: Vajacki marš, Belarusian Marseillaise, Kupalinka

Uladzimier Teraŭski (Belarusian: Уладзімер Тэраўскі; 11 November 1871 - 10 November 1938) was a Belarusian composer, choirmaster and a victim of Stalin’s purges. He wrote music to a number of popular Belarusian songs such as Vajacki Marš and Kupalinka.

== Early years ==
Teraŭski was born into the family of a parish priest in the village of Ramanaŭ, Minsk Governorate of the Russian Empire (currently known as the village of Lenin in the Slutsk District, Minsk region of Belarus).

He graduated from the Slucak Theological Seminary in 1889 but did not enter priesthood. After serving in the Russian Imperial Army, Teraŭski worked in Russia for a number of years and pursued his love for music. He joined the choir of the famous Russian conductor and musician Dmitrij Agrenev-Slavjanskij. The choir's repertoire included, among others, several Belarusian folk songs.

In 1900 he returned to Belarus where he continued his passion for music. He worked as a psalmist, an assistant church choir regent and a music teacher.

== A leading figure of Belarusian music ==
On the waive of the Belarusian national revival of the early 20th century, Teraŭski became a leading figure on the fledgling Belarusian music scene and is regarded as one of the founders of the national music school.

In 1914 he created one of the first Belarusian choirs. After the February Revolution, the choir became part of the First Belarusian Society of Drama and Comedy, and Teraŭski headed the musical part of the Society. During the existence of the Belarusian Democratic Republic, he was appointed the head of the state choir.

After the defeat of the Belarusian national movement, Teraŭski was arrested by the Cheka and sentenced to death. However the sentence was commuted to 5 years’ imprisonment and he was released earlier, in 1923.

After his release, he worked as a choirmaster in Soviet Belarus and wrote music for a number of plays (the best known of which was "On Kupala Night" (На Купалле) by Michaś Čarot) and set to music poems by Janka Kupala, Jakub Kolas, Zmitrok Biadula, Michaś Čarot and others. He recorded and arranged folk songs, some of which were published in the collections "Belarusian songbook with notes for three voices according to folk melodies" (1921), "Belarusian lyricist" (1922), and "Military collection" (1926).

In 1930 Teraŭski was accused of being a “national democrat” and lost his job as a result. He became a psalmist in a Minsk church.

== Second arrest and death ==
Teraŭski was arrested again in August 1938 and in November sentenced to death by an NKVD troika as a "Polish intelligence agent". He was executed on 10 November 1938 in the Minsk NKVD prison. The NKVD operatives ransacked his personal archive, which contained a large collection of Belarusian songs.

Teraŭski was posthumously exonerated of all charges - first during the Khrushchev Thaw in 1957 and then in 1996, after Belarus’ independence.

== Legacy ==
Teraŭski is best known for setting to music a number of popular Belarusian songs, such as:

- Vajacki Marš (lyrics by Makar Kraŭcoŭ)
- Belarusian Marseillaise (lyrics attributed to Aliaksandar Mikuĺčyk; and
- Kupalinka (Kupala Night maiden).

Despite Teraŭski’s exoneration, until recently his name had been forgotten and the music of Kupalinka had been described as “folk” with no identified authorship.
