= Rudzenski rural council =

Rudzenski rural council is a lower-level subdivision (selsoviet) of Pukhavichy district, Minsk region, Belarus.
