= Svislach, Pukhavichy district =

Urban-type settlement in Minsk Region, Belarus

Svislach Свіслач (Belarusian) Свислочь (Russian)
- Urban-type settlement
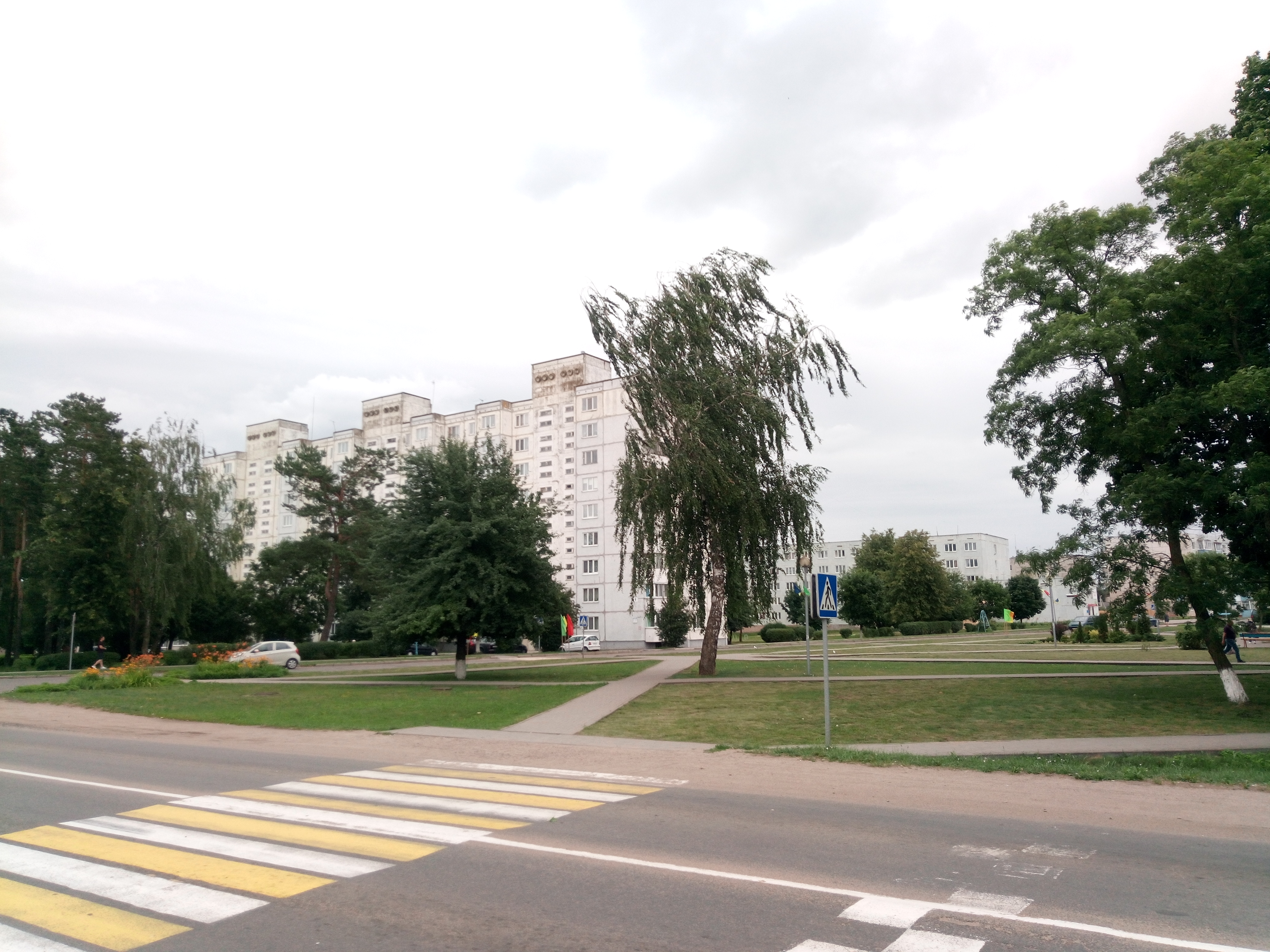

- Location within Belarus
- Coordinates: 53°38′32″N 27°55′07″E
- Country: Belarus
- Region: Minsk Region
- District: Pukhavichy District

Population (2024)
  - Total: 3,706
- Time zone: UTC+3 (MSK)

Svislach (Belarusian: Свіслач; Russian: Свислочь, romanized: Svisloch) is an urban-type settlement in Pukhavichy District, Minsk Region, Belarus. As of 2024, it has a population of 3,706.
