= Talitsa (Slutsk district) =

Village in Slutsk Region, Belarus

Talitsa Та́ліца
- Village
- Location within Belarus
- Coordinates: 53°00′45″N 27°48′35″E
- Country: Belarus
- Region: Minsk Region
- District: Slutsk District
- village: Talitsa
- Founded: 1852

Population
  - Total: 1
- Time zone: UTC+3 (MSK)
- Postal code: 223630
- Area code: +375 17

Talitsa (Belarusian: Таліца, romanized: Talica) is a village in the Slutsk District, Minsk Region, Belarus, 16 kilometres (9.9 mi) east of Slutsk and 100.4 kilometres (62.4 mi) south of Minsk. The terrain is flat and the village is in a forested area.

== History ==
In 1852, Talitsa was first documented as a farmstead within the state-owned Vybranetskaye estate of Slutsk County, Minsk Governorate, Russian Empire.

The permanent settlement began in 1854, when the hereditary Mikhail Fyodorovich Reutt (13.01.1814–12.03.1878~1893), a nobleman of the Gozdawa coat of arms, originally from Meleshkevichi village, purchased land in the state-owned farmstead, built a house and settled there with his wife (Maria Grigorievna, née Barkovskaya) and children (Ivan, Andrei, Paraska). Between 1854 and 1856, Mikhail Reutt's second cousin, Fyodor Danilovich Reutt, bought adjacent land and also built a house closer to the "right-angle turn" street in the center of Talitsa. From 1854 onward, Talitsa was designated as a urochishche (a small inhabited locality). By 1856, Talitsa was inhabited by nobles and townspeople and began to be called a hamlet. By 1856, the hamlet Talitsa had 6 households, including several members of the noble Reutt family, the Balvanovich family, a nobleman of the Prawdzic Coat of Arms, and the Zabrodsky family, a nobleman of the Prus II Wilczekosy coat of arms.

From 1893 and until around 1919, Talitsa continued to be referred to as a hamlet in Slutsk Volost, Slutsk County, Minsk Governorate, Russian Empire. From 1919, Talitsa became part of Slutsk District, Minsk Region, Byelorussian Soviet Socialist Republic (BSSR).

The village had a contract school; on November 19, 1928, the villagers successfully submitted a request to open the school in one of the village houses. The school had 13-15 children in attendance and was maintained by the villagers, who provided the house and paid the teacher 55 rubles.

From September 20, 1944, to January 8, 1954, Talitsa was part of Slutsk District, Bobruysk Region, BSSR. After the end of the Great Patriotic War, there were 20 homesteads in Talitsa. The village had a blacksmith shop. There was also a public club, which was later repurposed as a store, standing to the left of the road at the entrance to Talitsa when coming from Boraki. For several years, around 1975, a regular bus service ran from Slutsk to Talitsa, with the bus stop located in the center of the village near the turn.

== Cultural highlights ==
- The Talitsa Cemetery is located at the eastern edge of the village.
- 1.7 km from Talitsa, deep in the forest in the direction of Soragi village there is a Monument to an Unknown Pilot, which marks the crash site of a Soviet plane shot down on June 21, 1941. The date marks the eve of the Great Patriotic War, and the pilot remains unidentified.
