= Makar Kraŭcoŭ =

Belarusian writer

- Макар Краўцоў (Касьцевіч)
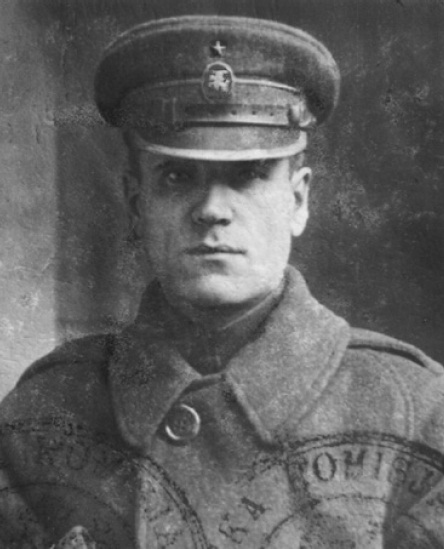
- Born: Makar Kaścievič; August 18, 1891; Babroŭnia village, Grodno Governorate (nowadays - Grodno District of Belarus)
- Died: October, 1939; Białystok
- Resting place: unknown
- Occupation(s): Belarusian writer; active participant in the Belarusian independence movement
- Organization: Rada of the Belarusian Democratic Republic
- Notable work: lyrics of Vajacki marš, popular Belarusian patriotic song

Makar Kraŭcoŭ (also known as Makar Kaścievič, Belarusian: Макар Краўцоў (Касьцевіч); 18 August 1891 – October 1939) was an active participant in the Belarusian independence movement, writer and a victim of Soviet repressions. He authored the lyrics to Vajacki marš, a popular patriotic song.

== Early years ==
Kraŭcoŭ (surname at birth, Kaścievič) was born into a prosperous farming family in the village of Babroŭnia, Hrodna province of the Russian Empire (nowadays in Hrodna district of Belarus).

He received his education in a teachers' seminary in Svislač and worked as a teacher in the Hrodna province.

== Involvement in the Belarusian independence movement ==
Kraŭcoŭ became actively involved in the Belarusian independence movement while serving in the Russian Imperial Army during World War I.

After the February Revolution he came to Minsk and took an active part in the preparation of the First All-Belarusian Congress. He was involved in the work of the Rada of the Belarusian Democratic Republic and of the Belarusian military commission which sought to create a Belarusian army.

A participant in the Slucak Uprising, he was in charge of the insurgents’ printing house in Klieck.

== Life in exile ==
After the defeat of the Belarusian independence movement by the Red Army, Kraŭcoŭ went into exile and lived in Vilnia, then within the Second Polish Republic.

He was a prolific writer, contributing to numerous Belarusian newspapers and also translating a number of books into Belarusian.

== Arrest and death ==
After the Soviet invasion of Poland in 1939, he was arrested and died in Soviet incarceration in Białystok in October of that year.

The exact date of his death and the place of burial are unknown.

== Author of Vajacki marš ==
Kraŭcoŭ is best known as the author of the lyrics of Vajacki marš. It was first published as a poem in the newspaper “Belarus” in 1919.

After being set to music by composer Uladzimier Teraŭski, it became the national anthem of the Belarusian Democratic Republic and later used as a popular patriotic song.
