= Steve Rosenberg =

British journalist (born 1968)

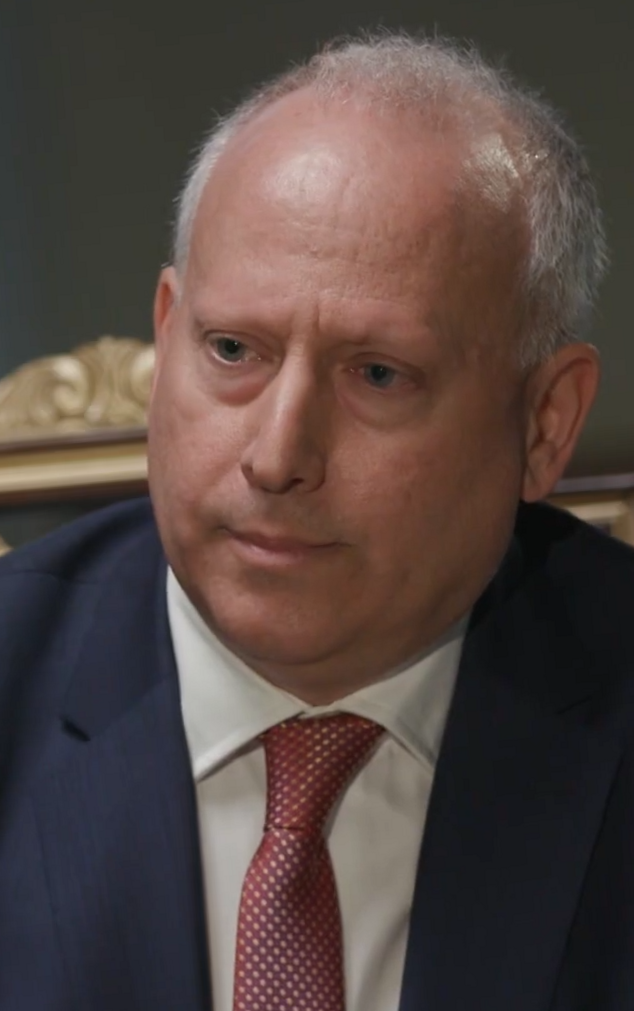
- Rosenberg interviewing Belarus President Alexander Lukashenko in 2021
- Born: Steven Barnett Rosenberg; 5 April 1968 (age 58); Epping, Essex, England
- Education: University of Leeds (BA)
- Occupation: Journalist
- Years active: 1994–present
- Employer: BBC (1997–present)
- Website: BBC News

Steven Barnett Rosenberg (born 5 April 1968) is a British journalist who serves as the Russia Editor for BBC News. He has been its Moscow correspondent since 2010, having previously held the role between 2003 and 2006. He served as the Berlin correspondent between 2006 and 2010. Since 2022, he has held the position of Russia Editor, the primary BBC correspondent for Russia-related news stories.

Rosenberg is fluent in the Russian language, having obtained a degree in Russian Studies from the University of Leeds in 1991. Rosenberg began his career as a Russian translator for CBS News from 1994; he has been at the BBC since 1997, and has been a journalist there since 1999.

== Early life ==
Steven Barnett Rosenberg was born on 5 April 1968 in Epping, Essex, England, and grew up in Chingford, East London. He is Jewish, and is of part Belarusian descent. His great-grandfather, Chiam Gnessen, was from Shklov in Mogilev Governorate (now part of Belarus). He emigrated to the UK on 18 July 1894, from the Baltic port of Liepāja (formerly Libau) in Latvia. Gnessen became a British subject in 1912. During his school summer holidays, Rosenberg worked at the BBC's teletext service, Ceefax.

=== Education ===
Following A-Levels at Chingford Senior High, he attended the University of Leeds receiving, in 1991, a first-class degree in Russian Studies (Bachelor of Arts). Rosenberg then moved to Moscow, initially teaching English at the Moscow State Technological University STANKIN.

== Career ==
Rosenberg began his career at CBS News' Moscow bureau, working as a translator, assistant producer and producer for six years, including covering the first war in Chechnya (1994–1996).

In 1997, he joined the BBC's Moscow bureau as a producer. On New Year's Eve 1999, no journalist was in the bureau when Boris Yeltsin unexpectedly announced his resignation. "That meant I had to step in to write and broadcast my first BBC dispatch," Rosenberg recalled 25 years later. He became a reporter in 2000 and Moscow correspondent in 2003. He covered major stories such as the Kursk submarine disaster (2000), the Nord-Ost theater siege (2002) and the Beslan school siege (2004). In 2003, he interviewed Russian oligarch Roman Abramovich.

From 2006 to 2010, Rosenberg served as the BBC's Berlin correspondent, covering Germany and Europe. He returned to Moscow as a correspondent in 2010.

In 2014, Rosenberg and his crew were attacked in Astrakhan after interviewing the sister of a Russian soldier killed during the war in Donbas. The BBC lodged a complaint with Russian authorities. In 2015, Ukraine temporarily banned him and other journalists over their coverage of the war. The decree cited "threat to national interests" and promoting "terrorist activities". The BBC labelled the ban "a shameful attack on media freedom". The authorities retracted the ban the following day.

Rosenberg also has a YouTube channel, where he has hosted his "Reading Russia" series since 2015, analysing the Russian press. The channel also features reports Rosenberg compiles for BBC broadcast news and piano videos.

In 2018, Rosenberg confronted Vladimir Putin about the attempted assassination of Sergei and Yulia Skripal, receiving widespread praise from journalists despite Putin's evasive response. In November 2021, he interviewed Belarusian President Alexander Lukashenko, who stated it was "absolutely possible" that Belarusian troops helped migrants in crossing the Belarus–Poland border to gain access to the EU.

On 10 March 2022, Rosenberg was appointed the Russia Editor for BBC News, to strengthen coverage of the Russian invasion of Ukraine.

== Piano playing ==
Rosenberg is an amateur piano player and a fan of the Eurovision Song Contest. Whilst covering the 2012 contest in Baku, Azerbaijan, he showcased his piano skills on the Ken Bruce Show, performing a ten-minute medley containing a short excerpt from every Eurovision winning song. He has repeated this medley on several occasions, including at the embassies in Russia of countries staging that year's contest, such as Portugal in 2018 and the Netherlands in 2021. Later in the show, he took part in a "Eurovision PopMaster", narrowly losing to the author of The Eurovision Song Contest – The Official History, John Kennedy O'Connor.

In 2013, after an interview, Rosenberg played the piano for Mikhail Gorbachev, performing "Moscow Nights", which Gorbachev sang, followed by "Dark is the Night" and "The Misty Morning", a favourite of Gorbachev's late wife Raisa. After interviewing Belarusian leader Alexander Lukashenko, Rosenberg published his performance of "Kupalinka", a protest song associated with the 2020–2021 Belarusian protests.

As part of the BBC's programming in the lead up to the Eurovision Song Contest 2023, Rosenberg, alongside Mel Giedroyc presented "Eurovision Piano Party". They were joined by Rebecca Ferguson, Daði Freyr (performer of Iceland's entry for 2020 and 2021), and others.

== Personal life ==
Rosenberg met his wife Olga, who is a charity worker, in Russia. They have a son and a daughter, who both live in the UK.

== Awards and recognition ==
- 2022 Best TV Individual Contributor 2022, Voice of the Listener and Viewer awards for Excellence in Broadcasting
- 2023 Royal Television Society Television Journalism Awards, Network Interview of the Year (Lukashenko)
- 2023 Broadcaster of the Year, London Press Club Awards
- 2025 Charles Wheeler Award, Outstanding Contribution to Broadcast Journalism
