= Prawdzinski =

Urban-type settlement in Minsk Region, Belarus

Prawdzinski Праўдзінскі (Belarusian) Правдинский (Russian)
- Urban-type settlement
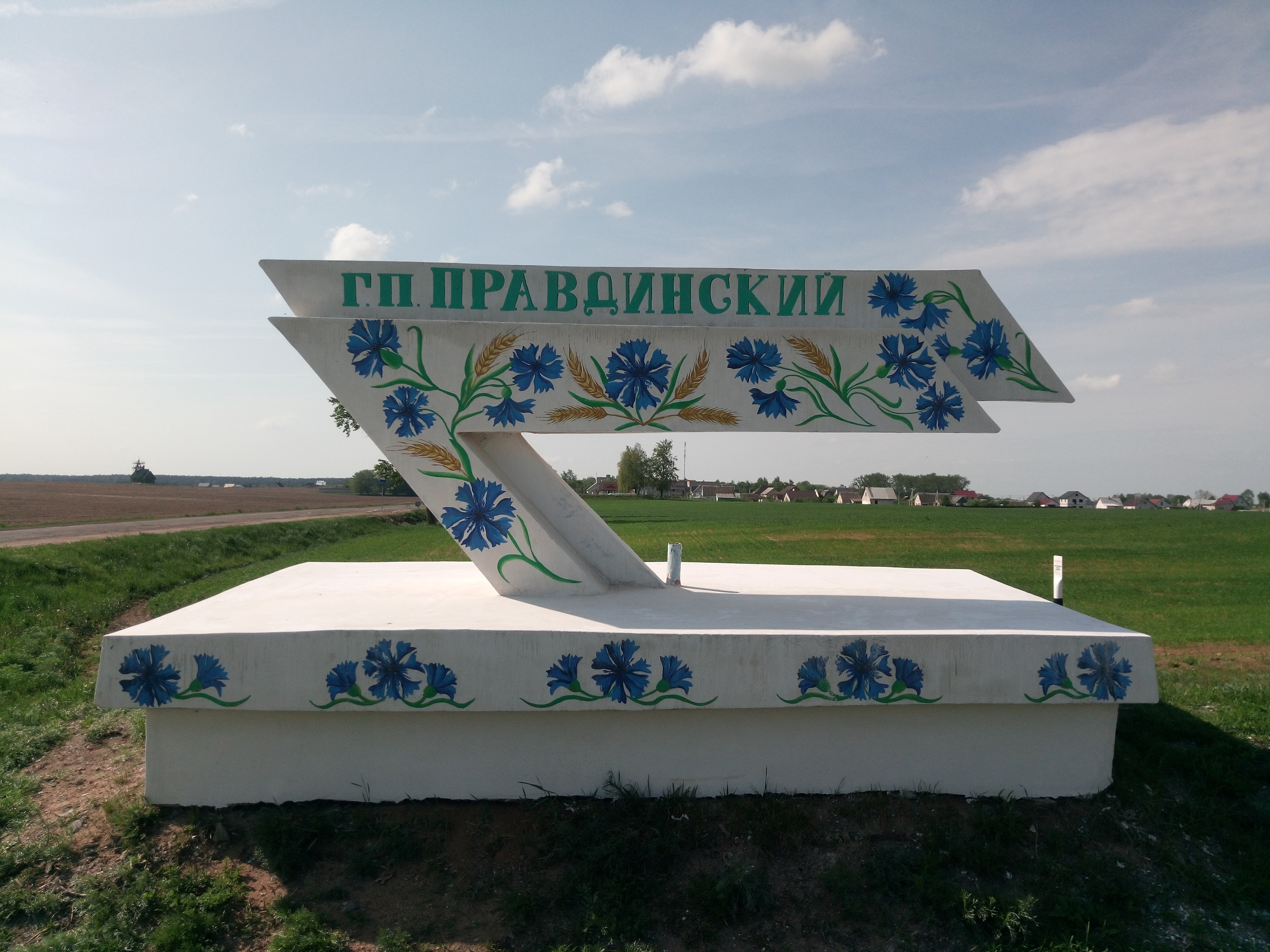

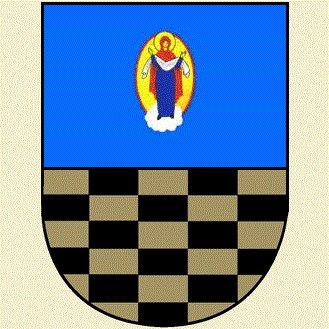
- Coat of arms

- Location within Belarus
- Coordinates: 53°31′23″N 27°49′37″E
- Country: Belarus
- Region: Minsk Region
- District: Pukhavichy District

Population (2025)
  - Total: 2,123
- Time zone: UTC+3 (MSK)

Prawdzinski (Belarusian: Праўдзінскі, romanized: Praŭdzinski; Russian: Правдинский, romanized: Pravdinsky) is an urban-type settlement in Pukhavichy District, Minsk Region, Belarus. As of 2025, it has a population of 2,123.
