= Michaś Čarot =

Belarusian playwright, writer and poet (1896–1937)

- Міхась Чарот
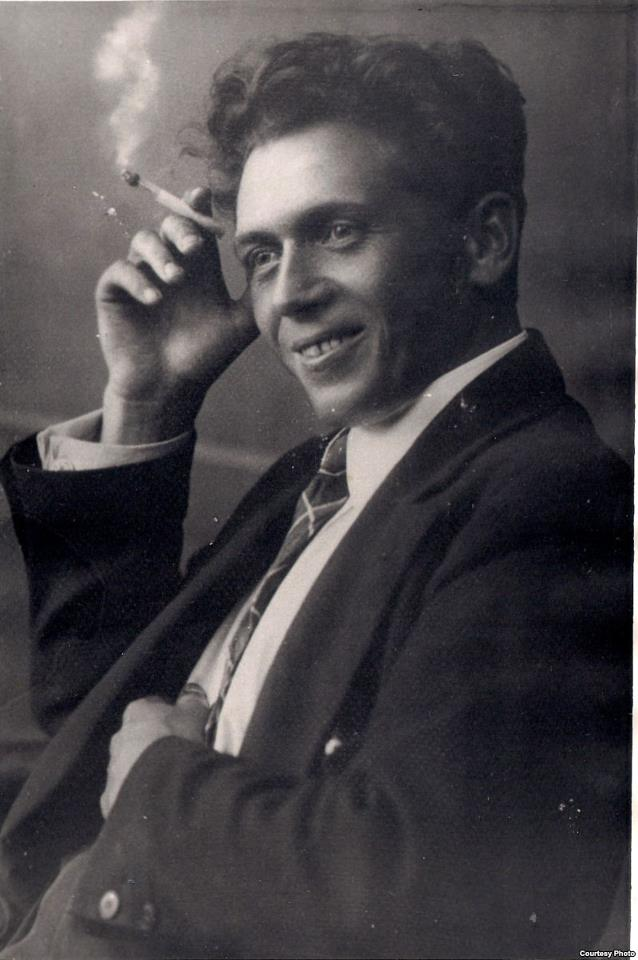
- Charot in 1930
- Born: Michaś Kudzielka; 7 November 1896; Rudziensk, Minsk Governorate (nowadays in Puchavičy District, Minsk region of Belarus)
- Died: 29 October 1937 (aged 40); Minsk
- Occupations: Poet, playwright, novelist
- Writing career
- Language: Belarusian
- Notable work: Kupalinka

Michaś Čarot (also spelled Mihas Charot; Belarusian: Міха́сь Чаро́т, born Michaił Symonavič Kudzielka (Belarusian: Міхаі́л Сымо́навіч Кудзе́лька); 7 November 1896 – 29 October 1937) was a Belarusian poet, playwright, and novelist who wrote under the pseudonyms of Maksim Byadneyshi (Максім Бяднейшы), Jurka Kurtati (Юрка Куртаты), and V. Čarot (В. Чарот). He was a victim of Stalin's purges (in particular those in Belarus) and was rehabilitated in 1956 during the Khruschev Thaw.

== Early years ==
Čarot was born into a peasant family in the town of Rudziensk, Ihumienski Uyezd of the Minsk Governorate of the Russian empire (nowadays in Puchavičy district, Minsk region of Belarus). Čarot's grandfather was a weaving master and received the surname appropriate to his profession from the lord, while the poet's grandmother worked as a nurse in the lord's palace. He had two brothers and sisters: Pavlo (engineer and home teacher), Alexander (agronomist), Maria (cook) and Nastya (actress).

In 1917 he graduated from the Molodechno Teachers' Seminary in Maladziečna. During the First World War, the seminary was evacuated to Smolensk, where Čarot spent the last two years of his studies.

After graduation, he was mobilized into the army. but was mobilised in the Russian Imperial Army. During the First World War, he served as an officer of the reserve regiment in Kuznetsk, where, together with other Belarusian officers, he tried to create a Belarusian circle. In the spring of 1918 he returned to Minsk, where he worked as a teacher, sang in the Teraŭski choir, and headed a theatre group, while also acting in the troupe of Vladislav Golubko.

During the Civil War and the intervention, he established contact with underground revolutionary organizations in Belarus, worked in the insurgent committee and was involved in the organization of insurgent detachments. He was one of the organizers of the Belarusian Communist Organization, which was formed in January 1920 from the members of "Young Belarus" during the Polish occupation. In 1920, he joined the Communist Party of Ukraine (b).

== Soviet career ==
In the 1920s, Čarot worked as the editor of several Belarusian newspapers and established himself as a poet, playwright and novelist on the wave of the policy of Belarusization. He is regarded as “one of the leaders of the Belarusian Soviet literature of the 1920s” whose works “reflect[ed] all the romantic impulses, contradictions and great illusions of his time”.

He became an employee of the newspaper "Soviet Belarus" in 1920, and served as its editor from 1925 to 1929. In 1924, he studied in Moscow at the State Institute of Journalism. During 1930-1932 he was editor of the biweekly "Red Belarus".

In 1923, he participated in the creation of the literary association "Maladnyak", which he left at the end of 1927. For some time he was a member of the association "Polymya", then joined the Belarusian Association of Proletarian Writers. Together with Y. Tarich, he created the script of the first Belarusian feature film, "Forest Byl", based on the story "Svinapas" (1926).

He was a candidate member of the Central Executive Committee of the BSSR from 1922 to 1924 and a full member from 1924 to 1931. In 1927, he was on the board of the Belarusian Society for Cultural Relations with Abroad. That year, during a business trip from the People's Congress together with T. Gartny and M. Zaretskyi, he visited Latvia, Germany, France and Czechoslovakia. In the 1930s, he worked as the head of the literary sector of the State Publishing House of the BSSR, while in 1934Member of the Union of Writers of the USSR (since 1934).

As the policy of Belarusization was reversed and repression intensified in Belarus in the 1930s, Čarot became increasingly concerned about his safety. He largely disengaged from literary activity, publicly denounced some of his “national-democratic” colleagues and encouraged people to cooperate with the Soviet security services, State Political Directorate (GPU). He addressed the poem "I am the first to sign a severe sentence..." (1930) to V. Lastovsky, M. Horetsky, A. Dudar, U. Dubovka, J. Pushcha and others arrested in connection with the "Union for the Liberation of Belarus" case, in which he denounced them ("You hid under the broom like mice") for their support for national democracy. He joined the Union of Writers of the USSR in 1934.

== Arrest, execution and rehabilitation ==
Čarot was arrested as a "Polish intelligence agent" in January 1937. He shared a cell with the poet Yurk Liavonny. The novelist and poet Masei Siadnev in his novel "Roman Korzyuk" mentioned how the Čarot was deliberately sedated after being tortured in order to find new names of "traitors" while he was unconscious. After interrogation and torture, he pleaded guilty.

His last poem "Oath", which declared his personal innocence, was written on the wall of the Minsk internal prison of the National Security Service, where Mykola Khvedarovich saw it and kept it in his memory:

In 1939 I was transferred to a solitary cell. I carefully examined the walls, looking for inscriptions, and then in a corner I read the text of a poem, carved with something sharp on the wall. It was the last meeting with my favorite poet and friend Michaś Čarot. I kept these words of his in my heart for years.

Čarot was sentenced to death by an NKVD troika in October 1937 and executed on 29 October in the Minsk NKVD prison. Soviet sources indicate the date of death as December 14, 1938, without mentioning the fact of execution.

He was posthumously exonerated during the Khrushchev Thaw in 1956. Streets in Maladziečna and Rudziensk are named after him.

== Main works ==
=== Plays ===
- На Купальле (On Kupala Night)

This was a musical play, which featured the famous Belarusian song Kupalinka. Čarot poetically reframed the lyrics of the folk song, and Belarusian composer Uladzimier Teraŭski wrote the music to it. Kupalinka was performed by the main character Alesia. She was played by non-professional actress Aliaksandra Aliaksandrovič, with whom Čarot was in love and to whom he wanted to dedicate the song. The play was a great success and was performed about 400 times.

Until recently, the song's lyrics and music had been described as “folk music” without identifiable authors - despite Teraŭski's and Čarot's posthumous exoneration.

=== Stories ===
- Дзіўная заява (Strange statement)
- Сон Габруся (The dream of Habruś)

=== Poems ===
- Босыя на вогнішчы (Barefoot by the fire)
- Балотам снежным праз сасоннік (Through a snowy swamp via a pine wood)
- Бунтар (Rebel)
- Ведай, свет... (You should know, the world ...)
- Вечарам (In the evening)
- Вечная бура (Eternal storm)
- Жывыя акорды (Live chords)
- Завіруха (A blizzard)
- На могілках (In the cemetery)
- Нам добра. Цёпла. Зямля ў пажары... (We’re comfortable. Warm. The earth is on fire ...)
- Поле ціха шаптала калоссем (The cornfield whispered softly)
- Родныя птушкі (Native birds)
- Сенажаці і полі аснежаны (Hayfields and cornfields are covered by snow)
- Шляхам зімнім (On the winter way)
