= Alfons Koziełł-Poklewski =

Polish industrialist and entrepreneur (1809–1890)

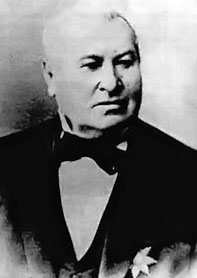
Alfons Poklewski-Koziełł

Alfons Koziełł-Poklewski (Russian: Альфонс Фомич Поклевский-Козелл, romanized: Alfons Fomich Poklevskiy-Kozyell; 1809–1890) was a Polish industrialist, social activist and real state councilor who became one of the richest entrepreneurs in Russian Siberia in the 19th century. Due to his success, he was known as the "vodka king of Siberia" and later called the "Siberian Rockefeller".

== Biography ==
Koziełł-Poklewski was born in 1809 in the Lepelsky Uyezd of the Russian Empire's Vitebsk Governorate in a polonized family (the Koziełł-Poklewski family) of Lithuanian szlachta, a class of gentry. He attended a school in Polotsk, and then the Vilna University. After graduating, he joined the treasury department of the Russian civil service in Saint Petersburg. Facing discrimination against Polish people, around 1838 he decided to relocate to Siberia, Russian empire's "wild frontier", where there was less prejudice regarding one's origins. In 1837, he received an award from the Russian Treasury Ministry, and from 1839 he worked in the administration of prince Pyotr Gorchakov.

He became increasingly involved in business activities, at first working for various merchants and businessman. In 1843, he purchased a steam boat and a privilege allowing navigation on the local rivers. He renovated the boat, and in 1846 launched the first regular shipping service in Western Siberia, on the rivers Ob and Irtysh (which would expand to number three steamboats and dozens of lesser vessels). In 1852, he retired from civil service and focused on his growing business. He opened shopping centers in Tobolsk and Tyumen. In 1869 he purchased a small alcohol factory in Talitsa, which eventually became his most profitable business, boosted by several other related factories and a chain of inns selling his products. Within a decade, he had a near monopoly on the production and distribution of vodka in Western Siberia and some nearby regions. His businesses were also involved in production of wine and beer. The company received international awards for the quality of its products, and he became known as the "vodka king of Siberia".

His business ventures were not limited to shipping and alcohol; he also invested in a number of mining and metallurgic enterprises. He invested in the construction of the Trans-Siberian Railway, built the first phosphorus factory in Russia, owned half of the glasswork production in Western Siberia, and in 1866, after completion of a steam-powered grain mill, he became a major player in the regional flour market.

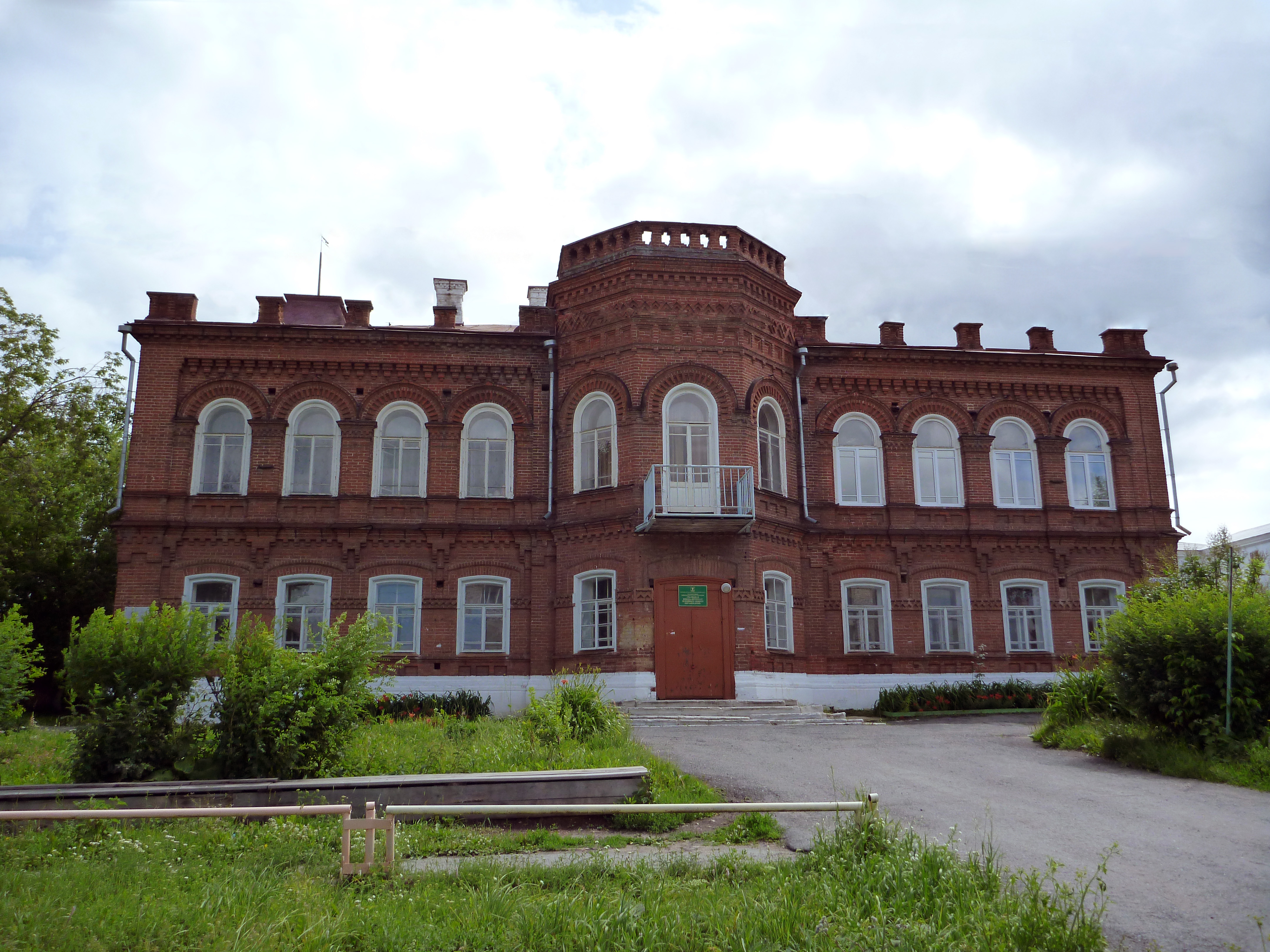
Koziełł-Poklewski House in Talitsa

He was also involved in a number of charity works, many devoted to helping Poles exiled to Siberia. He also sponsored construction of a number of mostly Catholic churches, and construction and operations of a number of hospitals, nurseries, schools, as well as an orphanage and a diner for the homeless.

When he died in 1890, his business empire, then called Poklewski Brothers Trading House, was estimated to be worth four million rubles, with major investments in 17 cities and towns, employing over 4,500 people. It was managed by two of his sons and prospered until the Russian Revolution of 1917 and the nationalization of Russian private enterprises.

== Personal life ==
He settled in Talitsa, married, and had several children, including: Ivan Koziełł-Poklewski, Wincenty Koziełł-Poklewski and Stanisław Koziełł-Poklewski.
