= Rudzyensk =

Urban-type settlement in Minsk Region, Belarus

Rudzyensk Рудзенск (Belarusian) Руденск (Russian) Rudensk
- Urban-type settlement
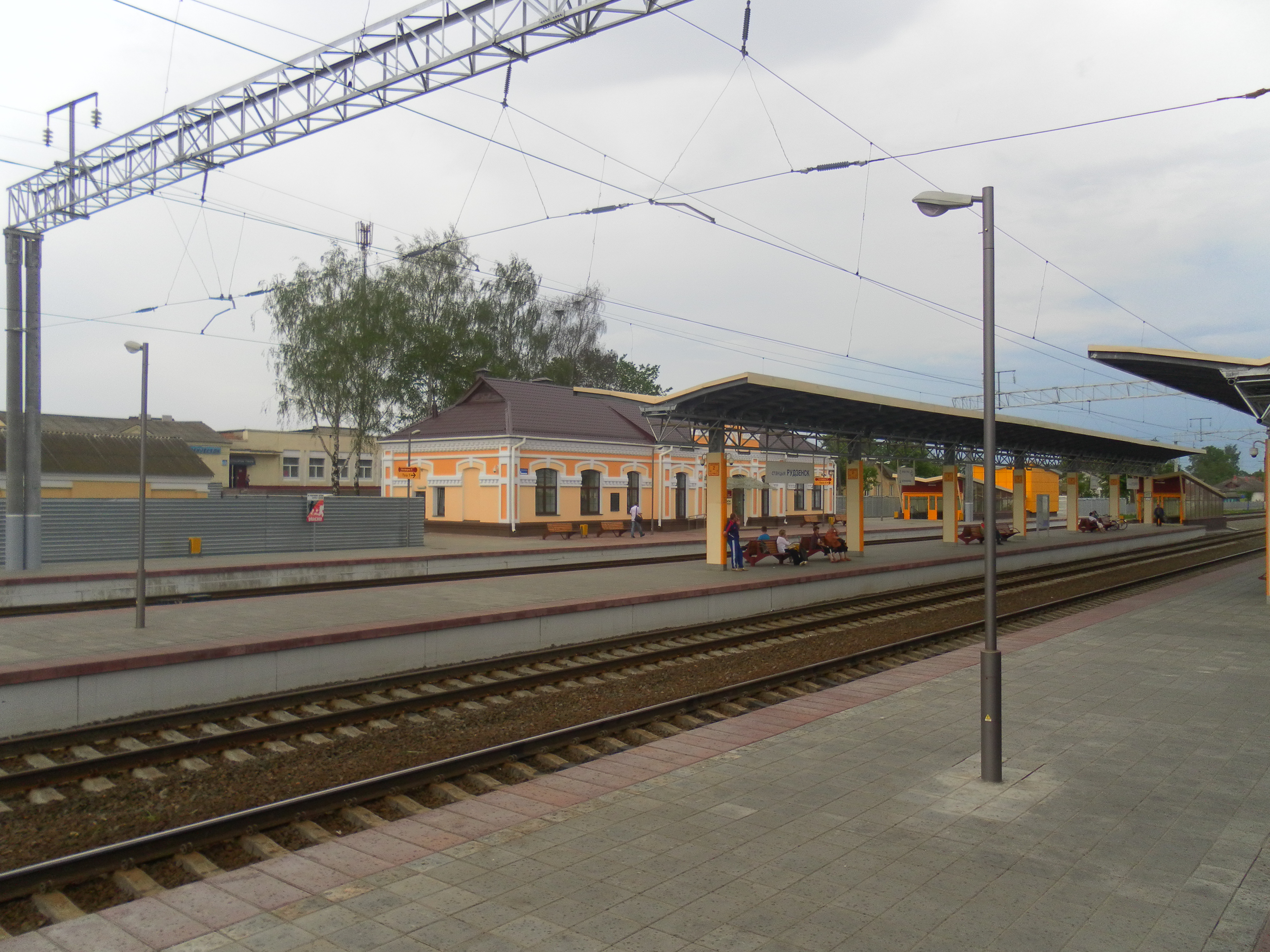
- Railway station

- Location within Belarus
- Coordinates: 53°35′00″N 27°51′00″E
- Country: Belarus
- Region: Minsk Region
- District: Pukhavichy District

Population (2025)
  - Total: 2,578
- Time zone: UTC+3 (MSK)
- Postal code: 222850
- License plate: 5

Rudzyensk or Rudensk (Note: Belarusian: Рудзенск, romanized: Rudziensk; Russian: Руденск; Polish: Rudzieńsk.) is an urban-type settlement in Pukhavichy District, Minsk Region, Belarus. In 2010, its population was 2,800. As of 2025, it has a population of 2,578.

== History ==
Rudzyensk received the status of urban-type settlement (Russian: городской посёлок) in 1938.

== Geography ==
Rudzyensk is located approximately 50 kilometres (31 mi) southeast from Minsk and 20 kilometres (12 mi) from Maryina Horka. Its nearest urban-type settlements are Svislach and Pravdinsky. Rudzyensk has a railway station on the Minsk-Babruysk-Gomel line.

== Sport ==
The local football club is FC Rudensk, which in 2010 joined the Belarusian First League. Though the team officially represents the town, its home ground is located in Maryina Horka, the administrative center of Pukhavichy District.

== Economy ==
The Minsk TEC-5 coal powered generating station is located nearby. Originally, the plant was built as the Minsk Nuclear Power Plant, consisting of two VVER-1000 reactors. After the disaster at Chernobyl, the plans were cancelled.

== Notable people ==
- Michaś Čarot (1896–1937), poet, playwright, novelist, and a victim of Stalin's purges

== Gallery ==
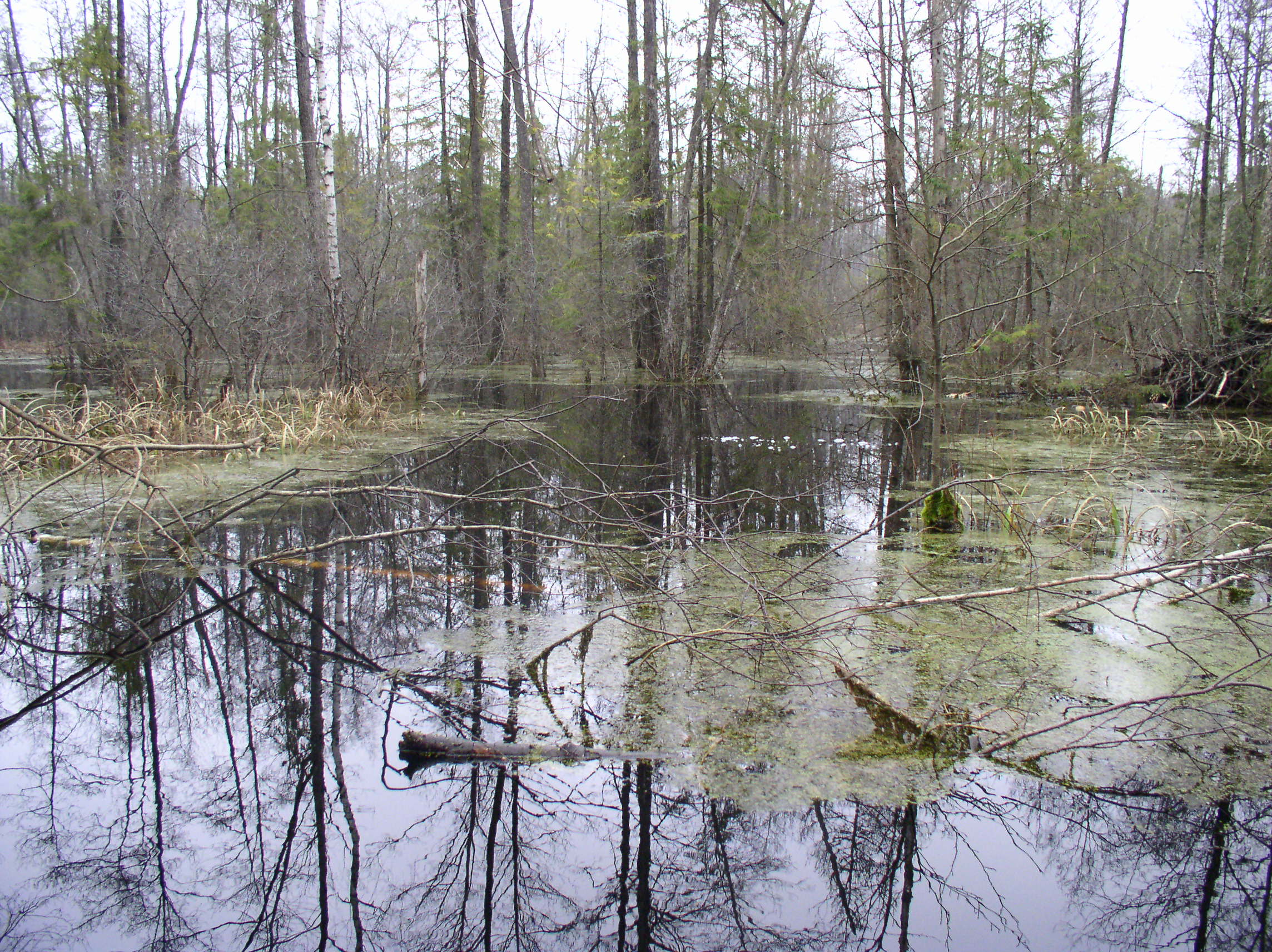
A swamp at peat mining near Rudensk

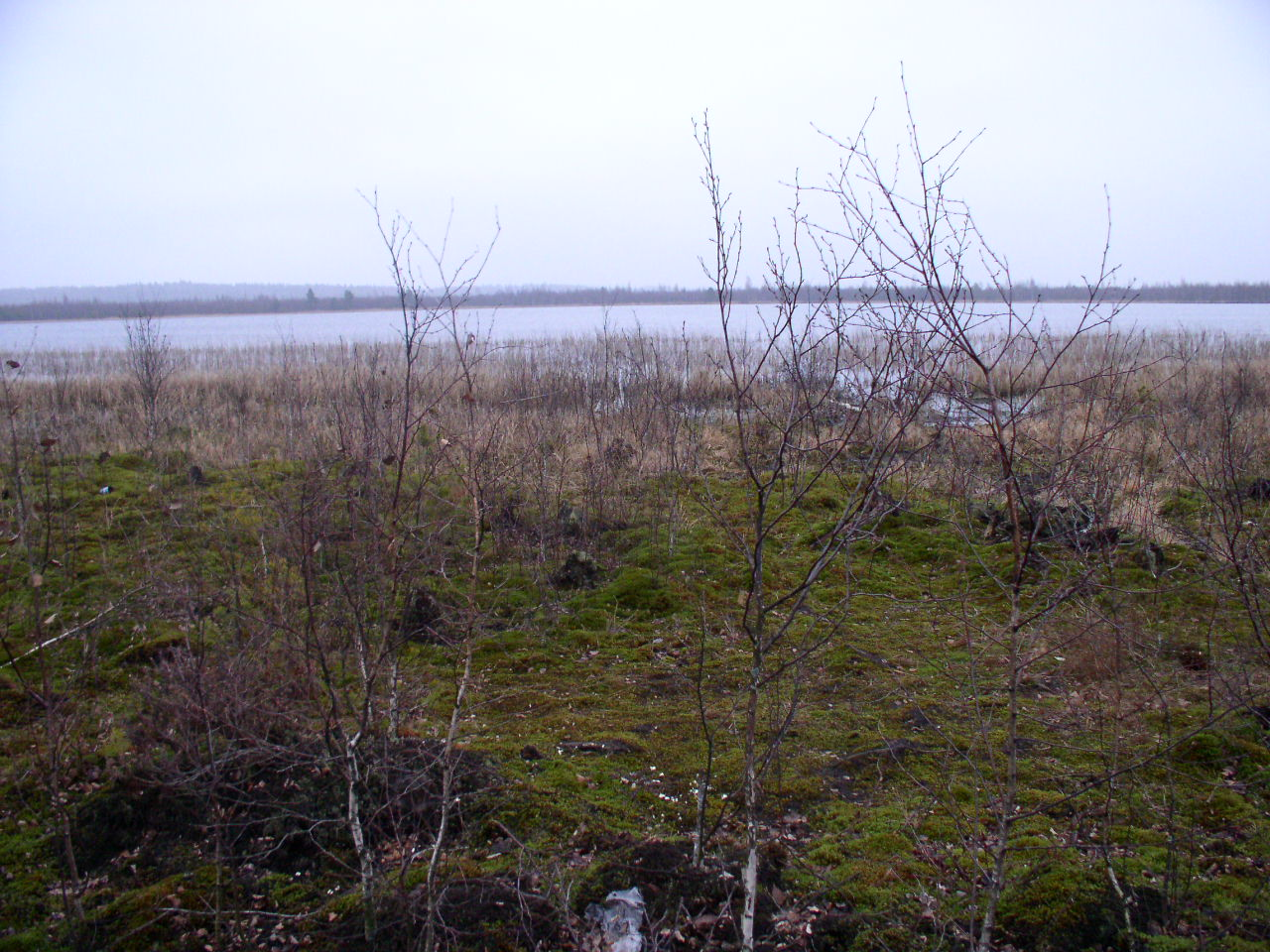
View of the Siniaje lake near Rudensk

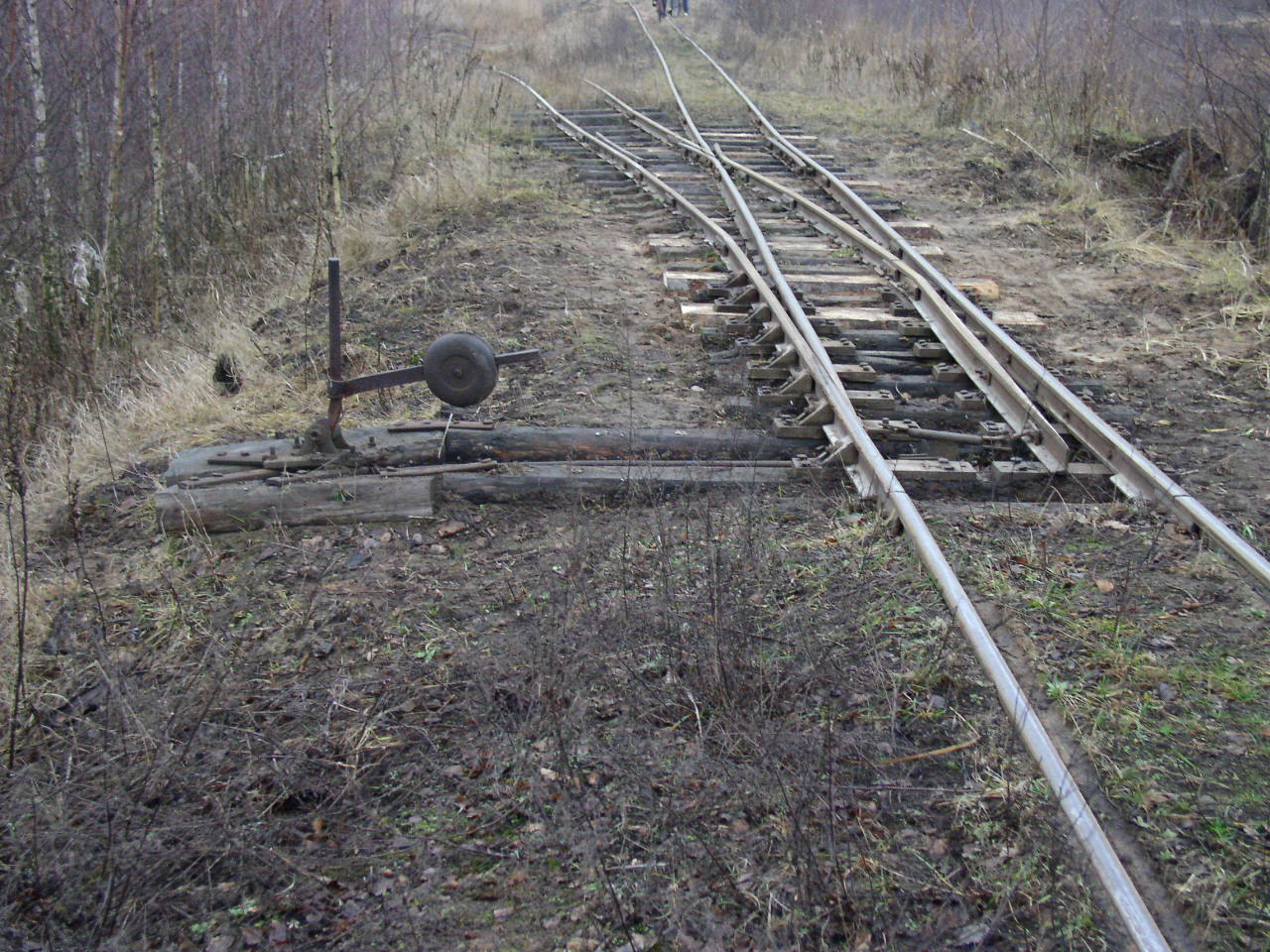
Narrow gauge railroad at peat mining near Rudensk
