= Talitsa, Altai Republic =

Talitsa Талица
- Selo
- Location within Altai Republic Location within Russia
- Coordinates: 51°02′N 84°18′E
- Country: Russia
- Region: Altai Republic
- District: Ust-Kansky District
- Time zone: UTC+7:00

Talitsa (Russian: Талица; Altay: Айты-Коол, Aytı-Kool) is a rural locality (a selo) in Ust-Kansky District, the Altai Republic, Russia. The population was 111 as of 2016. There are 3 streets.

== Geography ==
Talitsa is located 40 km northwest of Ust-Kan (the district's administrative centre) by road. Ust-Kumir is the nearest rural locality.
