= Belarusian Marseillaise =

Belarusian patriotic song

The name "Belarusian Marseillaise" (Belarusian: «Беларуская Марсельеза») has been used to refer to two Belarusian patriotic songs.

Above all, "Belarusian Marseillaise" is another name for the Belarusian song "We've slept for long" (Belarusian: «Адвеку мы спалі») the author of whose lyrics is unknown. The song was reportedly heard for the first time in 1906, "among the revolutionary peasantry of the Slutsk Uyezd, Minsk Governorate". The song was dubbed the "Belarusian Marseillaise" for the Belarusian national and revolutionary pathos of its lyrics, but was sung to a different tune than "La Marseillaise".

In late 1980s through early 1990s, the title "Belarusian Marseillaise" had also been used, occasionally, by the Belarusian national activists in relation to the song "Pahonya", with lyrics being the poem «Pahonya» by Belarusian poet Maksim Bahdanovich and the tune, indeed, that of La Marseillaise.

== Lyrics of "Belarusian Marseillaise" / "We've slept for long" ==
Note: The song was sung with numerous variations in text.

Belarusian (incomplete)

Адвеку мы спалі і нас разбудзілі,
Пазналі, што трэба рабіць,
Што трэба свабоды, зямлі чалавеку,
Што трэ’ лепшай долі здабыць

(2 last lines repeated)

Бо што ж то за марная доля такая
Для іншых карысці працуй
Па нашых абшарах чужынец гуляе
А ты ў родным краі гаруй

(2 last lines repeated)

...

Łacinka

Advieku my spali i nas razbudzili,
Paznali, što treba rabić,
Što treba svabody, ziamli čałavieku,
Što tre' lepšaj doli zdabyć

(2 last lines repeated)

Bo što ž to za marnaja dola takaja
Dla inšych karysci pracuj
Pa našych abšarach čužyniec hulaje
A ty ŭ rodnym kraji haruj

(2 last lines repeated)

...

English translation

We've slept for long and we're awoken
We've learnt what must be done,
That man needs land and freedom
That better life must be won

(2 last lines repeated)

For what's the wicked lot for us
To work for others fare well
So alien strolls over our realms
While you shed tears in own land

(2 last lines repeated)

...
