= Talitsa, Nikolsky District, Vologda Oblast =

Talitsa Талица
- Village
- Location within Vologda Oblast Location within Russia
- Coordinates: 59°45′N 44°40′E
- Country: Russia
- Region: Vologda Oblast
- District: Nikolsky District
- Time zone: UTC+3:00

Talitsa (Russian: Талица) is a rural locality (a village) in Vakhnevskoye Rural Settlement, Nikolsky District, Vologda Oblast, Russia. The population was 5 as of 2002.

== Geography ==
Talitsa is located 69 km northwest of Nikolsk (the district's administrative centre) by road. Panteleyevo is the nearest rural locality.
