= Talitsky District =

District in Sverdlovsk Oblast, Russia

Talitsky District Талицкий район (Russian)
- District
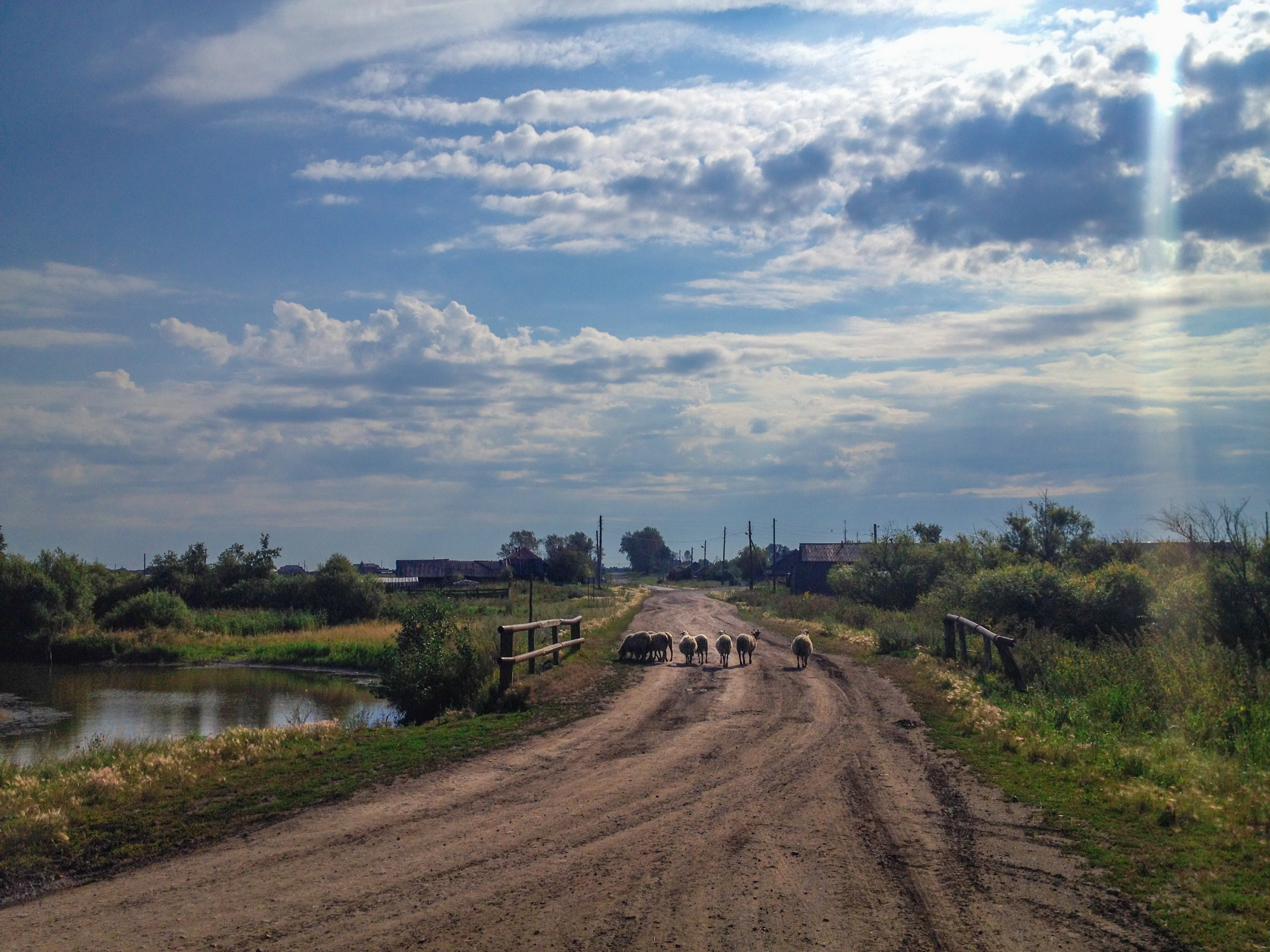
- Landscape in Talitsky District

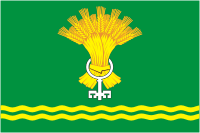
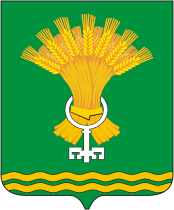
- Flag Coat of arms
- Location of Talitsky District in Sverdlovsk Oblast
- Coordinates: 56.929°N 63.789°E
- Country: Russia
- Federal subject: Sverdlovsk Oblast
- Administrative center: Talitsa

Area
  - Total: 4,458.63 km^{2} (1,721.49 sq mi)

Population (2010 Census)
  - Total: 47,309
  - Density: 10.611/km^{2} (27.481/sq mi)
  - Urban: 34.3%
  - Rural: 65.7%

Administrative structure
  - Administrative divisions: 1 Towns, 18 Selsoviets
  - Inhabited localities: 1 cities/towns, 94 rural localities

Municipal structure
  - Municipally incorporated as: Talitsky Urban Okrug
- Time zone: UTC+5 (MSK+2)
- OKTMO ID: 65724000
- Website: http://www.atalica.ru

Population of Talitsky District
- 2010 Census: 47,309
- 2002 Census: 55,675
- 1989 Census: 64,976
- 1979 Census: 62,141

Talitsky District (Russian: Та́лицкий райо́н) is an administrative district (raion), one of the thirty in Sverdlovsk Oblast, Russia. As a municipal division, it is incorporated as Talitsky Urban Okrug. Its administrative center is the town of Talitsa. As of the 2010 Census, the total population of the district was 47,309, with the population of Talitsa accounting for 34.3% of that number.

Boris Yeltsin was born in Butka, in the district.
