= Druzhnaya, Vladimir Oblast =

Druzhnaya Дружная
- Village
- Location within Vladimir Oblast Location within Russia
- Coordinates: 56°02′N 41°47′E
- Country: Russia
- Region: Vladimir Oblast
- District: Vyaznikovsky District
- Time zone: UTC+3:00

Druzhnaya (Russian: Дружная) is a rural locality (a village) in Styopantsevskoye Rural Settlement, Vyaznikovsky District, Vladimir Oblast, Russia. The population was 25 as of 2010.

== Geography ==
Druzhnaya is located on the Vazhel River, 52 km southwest of Vyazniki (the district's administrative centre) by road. Usady is the nearest rural locality.
