= Talitsa, Dobryanka, Perm Krai =

Talitsa Талица
- Settlement
- Location within Perm Krai Location within Russia
- Coordinates: 58°10′N 56°35′E
- Country: Russia
- Region: Perm Krai
- District: Dobryansky District
- Time zone: UTC+5:00

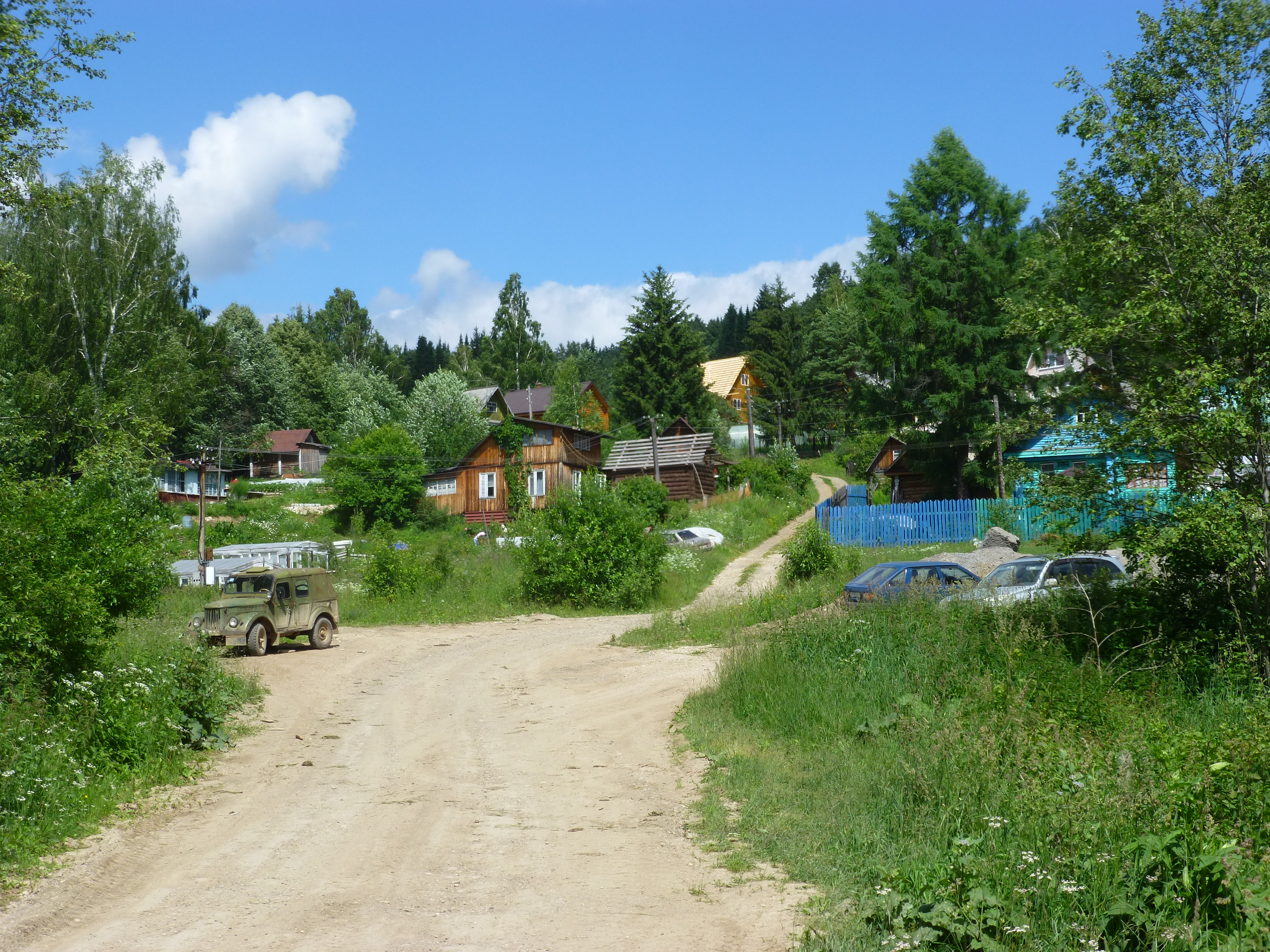

Talitsa (Russian: Талица) is a rural locality (a settlement) in Dobryansky District, Perm Krai, Russia. The population was 6 as of 2010. There are 19 streets.
