= Druzhny, Minsk region =

Settlement in Minsk Region, Belarus

Druzhny Дружны (Belarusian) Дружный (Russian)
- Settlement
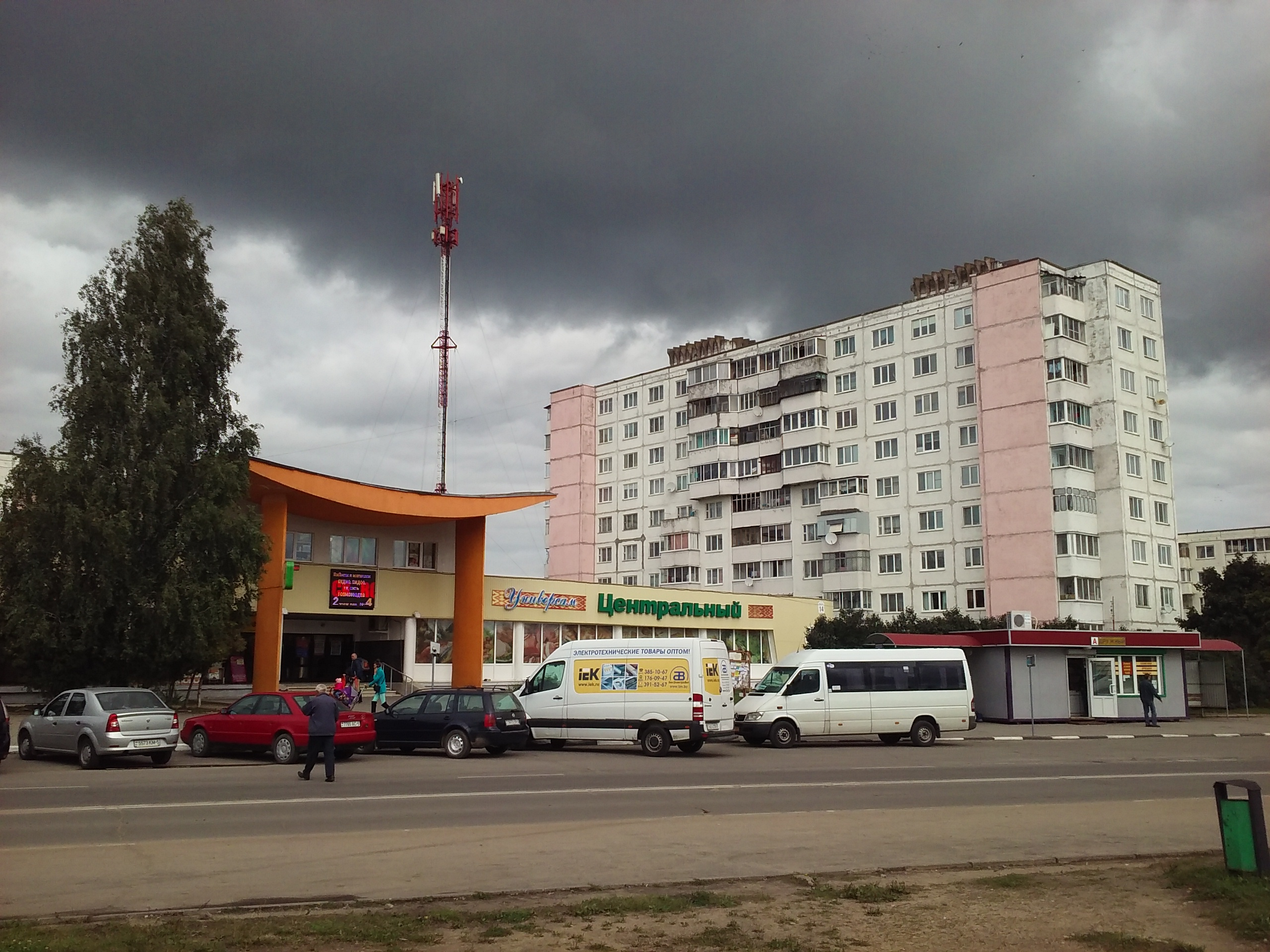

- Location within Belarus
- Coordinates: 53°37′26″N 27°53′56″E
- Country: Belarus
- Region: Minsk Region
- District: Pukhavichy District
- Founded: 1985

Population (2016)
  - Total: 9,038
- Time zone: UTC+3 (MSK)
- Area code: +375 1713

Druzhny (Belarusian: Дружны, romanized: Družny; Russian: Дружный; Polish: Drużny) is a settlement in Pukhavichy District, Minsk Region, Belarus. It is located 40 kilometres (25 mi) south of Minsk. As of 2016, its population was 9,038.

== Economy ==
The Minsk СEC-5 coal powered generating station is located nearby. Originally the plant was built as the Minsk Nuclear Power Plant, consisting of two VVER-1000 reactors. After the Chernobyl disaster, the plans were cancelled.

== Notable people ==
- Alyaksandr Krotaw (born 1995), Belarusian professional footballer
