= Talitsa, Talitsky District, Sverdlovsk Oblast =

Town in Talitsky District, Sverdlovsk Oblast, Russia

Coordinates: 57°00′45″N 63°43′45″E

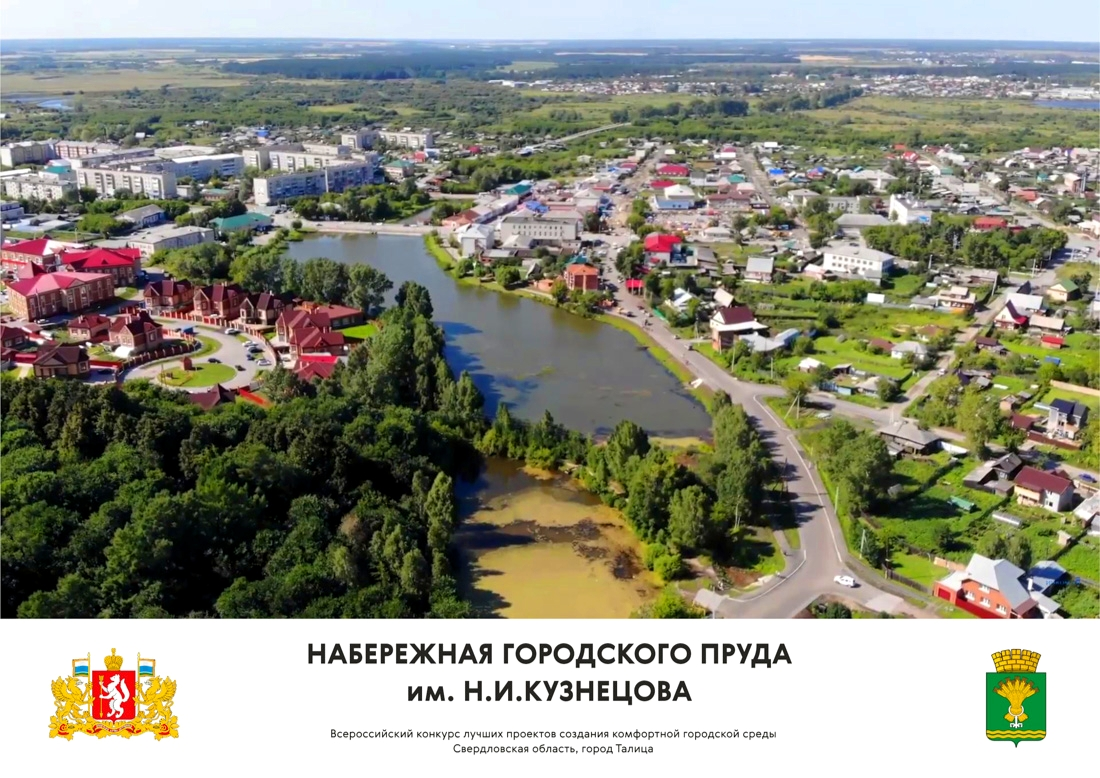

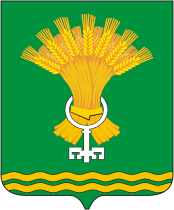
Coat of arms

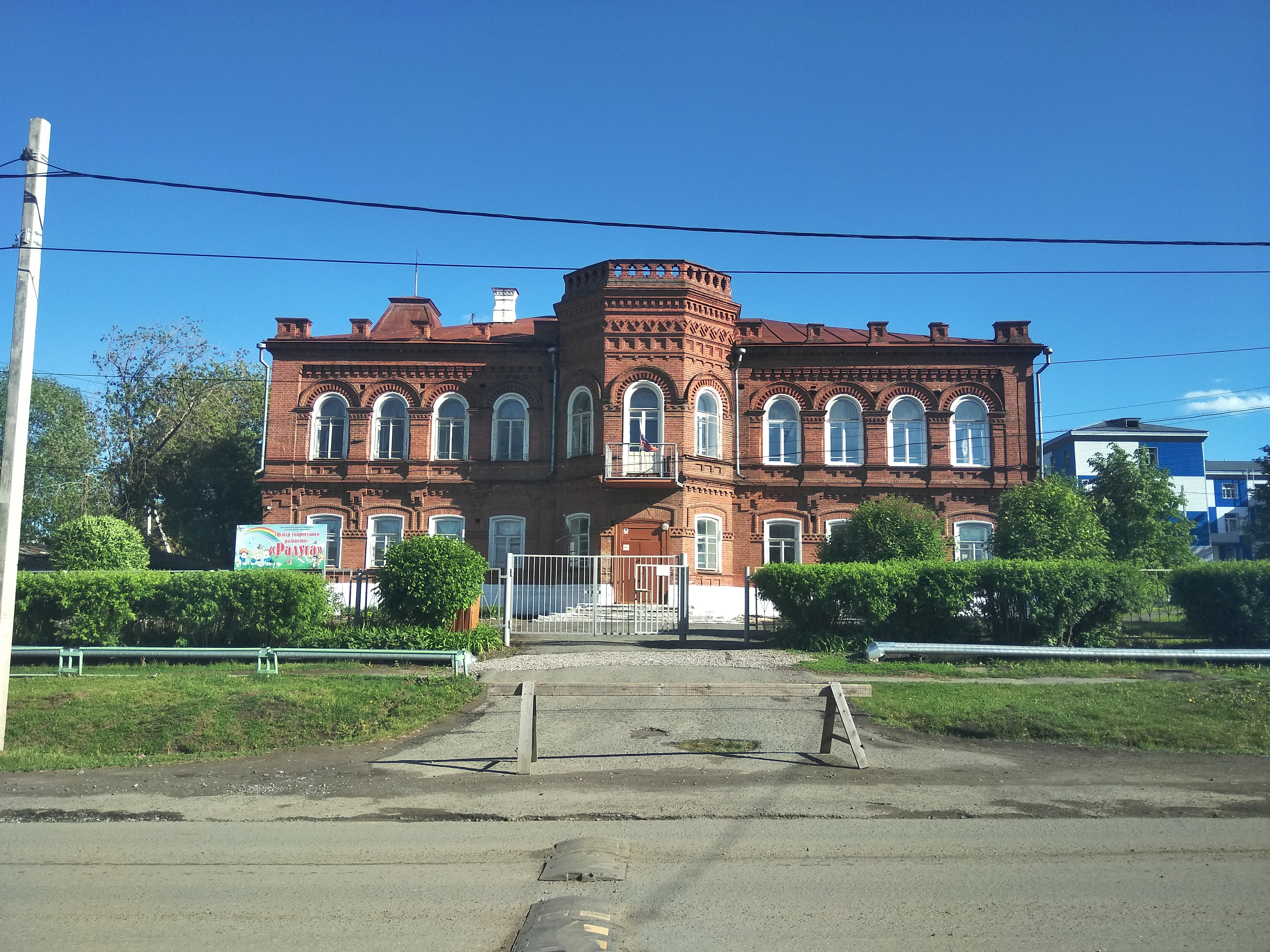
House of Alfons Koziełł-Poklewski in Talitsa, a national historic monument

Talitsa (Russian: Талица) is a town and the administrative center of Talitsky District of Sverdlovsk Oblast, Russia, located on the right bank of the Pyshma River (Ob's basin), near the Yekaterinburg–Tyumen segment of the Trans-Siberian Railway, 219 kilometers (136 mi) east of Yekaterinburg. Population: 16,225 (2010 census); 18,860 (2002 census); 19,888 (1989 Soviet census).

== History ==
Talitsa was founded in 1732 in association with a vodka distillery. In 1885 a station on the Trans-Siberian Railway was opened in nearby Troitsky, situated 5 kilometers (3.1 mi) north of Talitsa. The settlement was granted town status in 1942.

== Economy ==
Food, biochemical and pharmaceutical (chlortetracycline) industries have traditionally been strong in Talitsa. Forestry occupies another large section of the town's economy. The Talitsa Forestry College hosts a large collection of plants in its arboretum in downtown Talitsa. The town is also famous for its handmade carpets. A spa resort area near the town has spring-fed and mud baths, and the water is also bottled for sale as a medicinal drink.

== Transportation ==
Talitsa can reached by train to Troitsky, or by road.

== Notable people ==
- Nikolai Ivanovich Kuznetsov, Soviet intelligence officer during World War II
- Sergey Nikolsky, mathematician
- Alfons Koziełł-Poklewski, industrialist
