= Druzhnaya, Perm Krai =

Druzhnaya Дружная
- Village
- Location within Perm Krai Location within Russia
- Coordinates: 56°57′N 54°39′E
- Country: Russia
- Region: Perm Krai
- District: Yelovsky District
- Time zone: UTC+5:00

Druzhnaya (Russian: Дружная) is a rural locality (a village) in Bryukhovskoye Rural Settlement, Yelovsky District, Perm Krai, Russia. The population was 45 as of 2010. There are three streets.
