= Talitsa, Ivanovo Oblast =

Talitsa Талица
- Village
- Location within Ivanovo Oblast Location within Russia
- Coordinates: 57°11′N 42°45′E
- Country: Russia
- Region: Ivanovo Oblast
- District: Yuryevetsky District
- Time zone: UTC+3:00

Talitsa (Russian: Талица) is a rural locality (a selo) in Yuryevetsky District, Ivanovo Oblast, Russia. Population: 107 (2010 census);

== Geography ==
This rural locality is located 26 kilometres (16 mi) from Yuryevets (the district's administrative centre), 110 kilometres (68 mi) from Ivanovo (capital of Ivanovo Oblast) and 348 kilometres (216 mi) from Moscow. Lipovka is the nearest rural locality.
