= Jurka Listapad =

Belarusian independence activist

- Юрка Лістапад
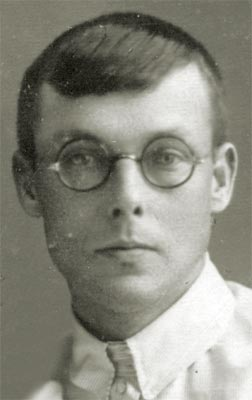
- Born: 7 April 1897 the village of Varkavičy (nowadays Slutsk District, Minsk Region, Belarus).
- Died: 5 July 1938 (aged 41); Gulag
- Cause of death: Executed (posthumously exonerated)
- Education: Teachers College of Panevėžys
- Occupations: teacher, publicist
- Movement: Belarusian independence movement and anti-Soviet resistance

Jurka Listapad (Belarusian: Ю́рка Лістапа́д, full name Ю́рый Іва́навіч Лістапа́д); 7 April 1897 - 5 July 1938) was an active participant in the Belarusian independence movement and anti-Soviet resistance, publicist and a victim of Stalin's purges of 1937-38.

== Early years ==
Listapad was born on 7 April 1897 into a farming family in the village of Varkavičy, Slutsky Uyezd, Minsk Governorate of the Russian Empire (nowadays Slutsk District, Minsk Region of Belarus).

In 1914 he graduated from a teachers college in Panevėžys and returned to his native Slutsk.

After a spell as a teacher, Listapad moved to Minsk and worked in publishing. He also started writing as well as translating. His work “Sluckaje viasieĺlie” (Belarusian: Слуцкае вясельле, The Slutsk Wedding) was published in 1920. He was an active member of several Belarusian pro-independence organisations, such as the National Committee and “Paparać-kvietka" (Belarusian: Папараць-кветка, The Fern Flower).

== Anti-Soviet Resistance and persecution ==
In 1920 Listapad was elected to the Belarusian Rada (Council) of Slutsk and participated in the Slutsk uprising, an anti-Bolshevik pro-independence military campaign in central Belarus.

Following the defeat of the uprising, he briefly lived in exile in the Second Polish Republic but returned to Slutsk in 1922 and established an underground anti-Soviet organisation.

He was arrested in 1925 and sentenced to five years in prison. He was re-arrested in 1930 and then again in 1933 after which he was sent to the Gulag.

== Death sentence and posthumous exoneration ==
In March 1938 Listapad was sentenced to death for “anti-Soviet propaganda”. He was posthumously exonerated during the Khrushchev Thaw in 1956.

== Works ==
- Слуцкае вясельле (The Slutsk Wedding) // Беларусь, 1920, No. 108—110
- Узьбіліся на свой шлях (Whipped up in our Way) // Наша думка (Вільня), 1921, No. 9—10
