= Druzhnaya, Bryansk Oblast =

Druzhnaya Дружная
- Village
- Location within Bryansk Oblast Location within Russia
- Coordinates: 52°58′N 34°32′E
- Country: Russia
- Region: Bryansk Oblast
- District: Navlinsky District
- Time zone: UTC+3:00

Druzhnaya (Russian: Дружная) is a rural locality (a village) in Navlinsky District, Bryansk Oblast, Russia. The population was 13 as of 2010. There is 1 street.

== Geography ==
Druzhnaya is located 20 km north of Navlya (the district's administrative centre) by road. Chichkovo is the nearest rural locality.
