= Kupalinka =

"Купалінка"

Song
- Language: Belarusian
- English title: Kupalinka
- Written: 1921
- Songwriter(s): Uladzimier Teraŭski
- Lyricist(s): Michaś Čarot

Kupalinka is a popular Belarusian song described as a “musical business card of Belarus”.

== Lyrics ==
The song's lyrical heroine, the Kupala Night Maiden is “weeding a rose, piercing her white hands” and “plucking flowers, weaving wreaths, and shedding tears”.

It is considered that the song has become “the national personification of Belarus as a country with a beautiful and sad woman’s face”.

== History ==
Based on folk motives, it was set to music by Uladzimier Teraŭski, Belarusian composer, in 1921.

Kupalinka was written as a part of a musical play titled “On Kupala Night” (Belarusian: На Купальле) produced by Belarusian poet Michaś Čarot, who poetically reframed the lyrics of the folk song. Kupalinka was performed by the main character Alesia. It was played by non-professional actress Aliaksandra Aliaksandrovič, with whom Čarot was in love and to whom he wanted to dedicate the song. The play was a great success and was performed about 400 times.

During Stalin's purges of the late 1930s both Teraŭski and Čarot were arrested and executed. Until recently, their names had been largely forgotten and the song's lyrics and music had been described as “folk” without identifiable authors—despite Teraŭski's and Čarot's posthumous exoneration.

== Lasting popularity ==
The song remained popular in Soviet and post-Soviet Belarus. It is traditionally sung during Kupala Night celebrations and has also been performed by a number of professional musicians and notable personalities, including:

- Belarusian folk rock band Pesniary;
- Belarusian indie rock band Naviband;
- English rock band Deep Purple;
- 2009 Eurovision winner, Alexander Rybak;
- Belarusian singer, 2005 Eurovision entrant Angelica Agurbash.
- BBC journalist Steve Rosenberg:

Despite its lyrical nature, the song has become a protest song during the 2020–2021 Belarusian protests, alongside patriotic songs such as Pahonia and Mahutny Boža.
