= Druzhnaya Gorka =

Druzhnaya Gorka (Russian: Дружная Горка) is the name of several inhabited localities in Russia.

Urban localities

- Druzhnaya Gorka, Leningrad Oblast, an urban-type settlement under the administrative jurisdiction of Druzhnogorskoye Settlement Municipal Formation in Gatchinsky District of Leningrad Oblast; 59°17′N 30°8′E

Rural localities

- Druzhnaya Gorka, Novgorod Oblast, a village in Berezovikskoye Settlement of Okulovsky District in Novgorod Oblast
- Druzhnaya Gorka, Tver Oblast, a village in Okovetskoye Rural Settlement of Selizharovsky District in Tver Oblast
