= Warrior March =

Belarusian patriotic song

Ваяцкі марш
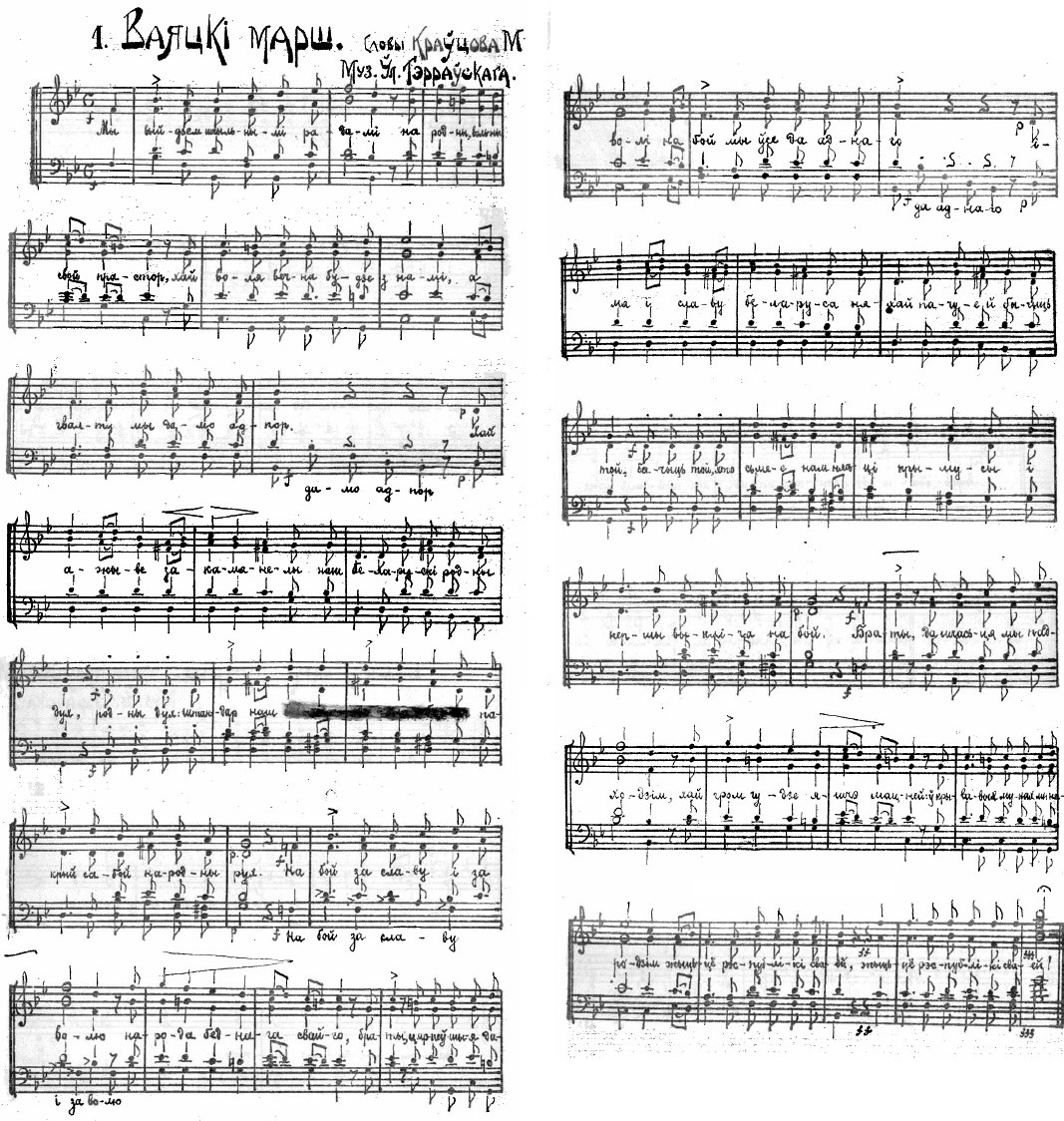
- Original sheet music of the anthem, 1919.
- Former national anthem of Belarus
- Also known as: «Мы выйдзем шчыльнымі радамі»
- Lyrics: Makar Kraŭcoŭ, 1919
- Music: Uladzimier Teraŭski, 1919
- Adopted: 1920

Audio sample
- Instrumental recording of "Vajacki marš": file; help

The "Warrior March", (Note: Belarusian: Ваяцкі марш, romanized: Vajacki marš, pronounced [vaˈjat͡skʲi ˈmarʂ]) also known by its incipit "Come, We Shall March in Joint Endeavour", (Note: Belarusian: Мы выйдзем шчыльнымі радамі, romanized: My vyjdziem ščylnymi radami, pronounced [mɨ ˈvɨjd͡zʲɛm ˈʂt͡ʂɨlʲnɨmʲi raˈdamʲi]) was the national anthem of the short-lived Belarusian Democratic Republic that existed from 1918 to 1919.

== History ==
The lyrics of the song were first published in 1919 in Minsk, in the newspaper Belarus. As the anthem of the Belarusian Democratic Republic, the song was approved in 1920, even though the republic was in exile at that time.

During the Soviet rule of Belarus, the song was banned. However, there were attempts to adapt the lyrics to the communist ideology by replacing mentions of the national Belarusian white-red-white flag with those of the Soviet red banner. Throughout the 20th century, the song was actively used by pro-independence organizations of the Belarusian diaspora.

After the restoration of the independence of Belarus in 1991, there were propositions to make "Vajacki marš" the national anthem of the Republic of Belarus once again. In particular, the renowned writers Vasil Bykau, Ales Adamovich and Ryhor Baradulin issued a public appeal in favour of making "Vajacki marš" the national anthem of Belarus. Other symbols of the Belarusian Democratic Republic, such as the Pahonia and the white-red-white flag, were restored as state symbols and used until 1995. The former anthem, however, was never restored as the country's national anthem, making the Soviet-era anthem retain its status as the official anthem, despite the restoration of the former symbols of independence. The retained anthem did not have any lyrics until 2002, when new lyrics replaced the Soviet-era ones.

Today, "Vajacki marš" enjoys certain popularity among the Belarusian democratic opposition and is traditionally mentioned as one of the possible alternatives to the current official anthem.

== Lyrics ==
Belarusian original

Мы выйдзем шчыльнымі радамі
На вольны родны наш (Note: Sometimes written as «свой» svoj, IPA: [s̪vo̞j]) прастор.
Хай воля вечна будзе з намі,
А ґвалту мы дамо адпор!

Хай аджыве закамянелы (Note: Also written as «Няхай жыве магутны, смелы» Niachaj žyvie mahutny, smieły, IPA: [nʲä.ˈxäj ˈʐɨ.vʲe̞ mä.ˈɣut̪.n̪ɨ ˈs̪ʲmʲe̞.ɫ̪ɨ]; "Long live the mighty, the brave")
Наш беларускі вольны дух;
Штандар наш бел-чырвона-белы,
Пакрыў сабой народны рух!

На бой! За шчасьце і за волю
Народу слаўнага свайго!
Браты, цярпелі мы даволі.
На бой! — усе да аднаго!

Імя і сілу беларуса
Няхай пачуе й (у)бачыць той,
Хто сьмее нам нясьці прымусы
I першы выкліча на бой.

Браты, да шчасьця мы падходзім:
Хай гром грыміць яшчэ мацней!
У крывавых муках мы народзім
Жыцьцё Рэспублікі сваей!

Łacinka

My vyjdziem ščylnymi radami
Na volny rodny naš prastor.
Chaj vola večna budzie z nami,
A gvałtu my damo adpor!

Chaj adžyve zakamianieły
Naš biełaruski volny duch;
Štandar naš bieł-čyrvona-bieły,
Pakryw saboj narodny ruch!

Na boj! Za ščaście i za volu
Narodu slawnaha svajho!
Braty, ciarpeli my davoli.
Na boj! – usie da adnaho!

Imia i siłu biełarusa
Niachaj pačuje j (u)bačyć toj,
Chto śmieje nam niaści prymusy
I pieršy vykliča na boj.

Braty, da ščaścia my padchodzim:
Chaj hrom hrymić jašče macniej!
U kryvavych mukach my narodzim
Žyćcio respubliki svajej!

IPA transcription (Note: See Belarusian phonology and Help:IPA/Belarusian.)

[mɨ ˈvɨj.d̻͡z̪ʲe̞m ˈʂt͡ʂɨl̪ʲ.n̪ɨ.mʲi rä.ˈd̪ä.mʲi]
[n̪ä ˈvo̞lʲ.n̪ɨ ˈro̞d̪.n̪ɨ n̪äʂ prä.ˈs̪t̪o̞r ǁ]
[xäj ˈvo̞.lʲä ˈvʲe̞t͡ʂ.n̪ä ˈbu.d̻͡z̪ʲe̞ z̪‿ˈn̪ä.mʲi ǀ]
[ä ˈɣväɫ̪.t̪u mɨ d̪ä.ˈmo̞ ät̪.ˈpo̞r ǁ]

[xäj äd̪.ˈʐɨ.vʲe̞ z̪ä.kä.mʲä.ˈn̪ʲe̞.ɫ̪ɨ]
[näʐ bʲe̞.ɫ̪ä.ˈrus̪.ˈkʲi ˈvo̞l̪ʲ.n̪ɨ d̪ux ǁ]
[ˈʂtän̪.d̪är n̪äʐ bʲe̞ɫ̪ ǀ t͡ʂɨr.ˈvo̞.n̪ä ˈbʲe̞.ɫ̪ɨ ǀ]
[pä.ˈkrɨw s̪ä.ˈbo̞j n̪ä.ˈro̞d̪.n̪ɨ rux ǁ]

[n̪ä ˈbo̞j ǀ z̪ä ˈʂt͡ʂäs̪ʲ.t̻͡s̪ʲe̞ ji z̪ä ˈvo̞.l̪ʲu]
[n̪ä.ˈro̞.d̪u ˈs̪ɫ̪äw.n̪ä.ɣä ˈs̪väj.ˈɣo̞ ǁ]
[ˈbrä.t̪ɨ ǀ t̻͡s̪ʲär.ˈpʲe̞.l̪ʲi mɨ d̪ä.ˈvo̞.l̪ʲi ǁ]
[n̪ä ˈbo̞j ǀ u.ˈs̪ʲe̞ d̪ä äd̪.n̪ä.ˈɣo̞ ǁ]

[ˈji.mʲä ji ˈs̪ʲi.ɫ̪u bʲe̞.ɫ̪ä.ˈru.s̪ä]
[n̪ʲä.ˈxäj pä.ˈt͡ʂu.je̞‿j(‿u.)ˈbä.t͡ʂɨt̻͡s̪ʲ t̪o̞j ǀ]
[xt̪o̞ ˈs̪ʲmʲe̞.je̞ n̪äm n̪ʲäs̪ʲ.ˈt̻͡s̪ʲi prɨ.ˈmu.s̪ɨ]
[ji ˈpʲe̞r.ʂɨ vɨ.ˈkl̪ʲi.t͡ʂä n̪ä ˈbo̞j ǁ]

[ˈbrä.t̪ɨ ǀ d̪ä ˈʂt͡ʂäs̪ʲ.t̻͡s̪ʲä mɨ pät̪.ˈxo̪.d̻͡z̪ʲim ǁ]
[xäj ˈɣro̞m ɣrɨ.ˈmʲit̻͡s̪ʲ jäʂ.ˈt͡ʂe̞ mät̻͡s̪ʲ.ˈn̪ʲe̞j ǁ]
[ɸ‿krɨ.ˈvä.vɨx ˈmu.käx mɨ nä.ˈro̞.d̻͡z̪ʲim]
[ʐɨ.ˈt̻͡s̪ʲːo̞ re̞.ˈs̪pu.bl̪ʲi.kʲi s̪vä.ˈje̞j ǁ]

Literary translation by Vera Rich

Come, we shall march in joint endeavour
Through the free spaces of our native land;
May freedom dwell with us forever,
And every onslaught we'll withstand.

Long live the Belarusian spirit brave,
The bold free spirit of our nation!
White-red-and-white the banners wave
Above our fight for liberation.

To arms! May happiness and freedom
For our brave people in the fight be won;
Too long in torment we were bleeding...
To battle, each and everyone!

Ah, may the Belarusian name and might
Be seen and heard from near and far
By all who'd rule us without right,
Or first dare challenge us to war.

Come, brothers, we march on to fortune,
Let thunder roar still louder in its strife!
We'll bring to birth from anguished torture
For our Republic a new life!

== See also ==
- "The Warrior March", a marching song by the U.S. Army Chorus with a very similar name
