= Butka, Russia =

Butka Бутка
- Village
- Location of Butka in Russia
- Coordinates: 56°43′N 63°47′E
- Country: Russia
- Oblast: Sverdlovsk Oblast

Population
  - Estimate (2010): 3,077

Butka (Russian: Бутка) is a village in Talitsky District, Sverdlovsk Oblast, Russia. It is known as the birthplace of the first President of the Russian Federation, Boris Yeltsin.
