= Druzhnoye, Amur Oblast =

Druzhnoye Дружное
- Selo
- Location within Amur Oblast Location within Russia
- Coordinates: 51°29′N 129°00′E
- Country: Russia
- Region: Amur Oblast
- District: Mazanovsky District
- Time zone: UTC+9:00

Druzhnoye (Russian: Дружное) is a rural locality (a selo) in Romankautsky Selsoviet of Mazanovsky District, Amur Oblast, Russia. The population was 168 as of 2018. There are 4 streets.

== Geography ==
Druzhnoye is located 32 km south of Novokiyevsky Uval (the district's administrative centre) by road. Romankautsy is the nearest rural locality.
