= Slutsk district =

District of Minsk region, Belarus

Slutsk district Слуцкий район (Belarusian) Слуцкі раён (Russian)
- District
- Flag Coat of arms

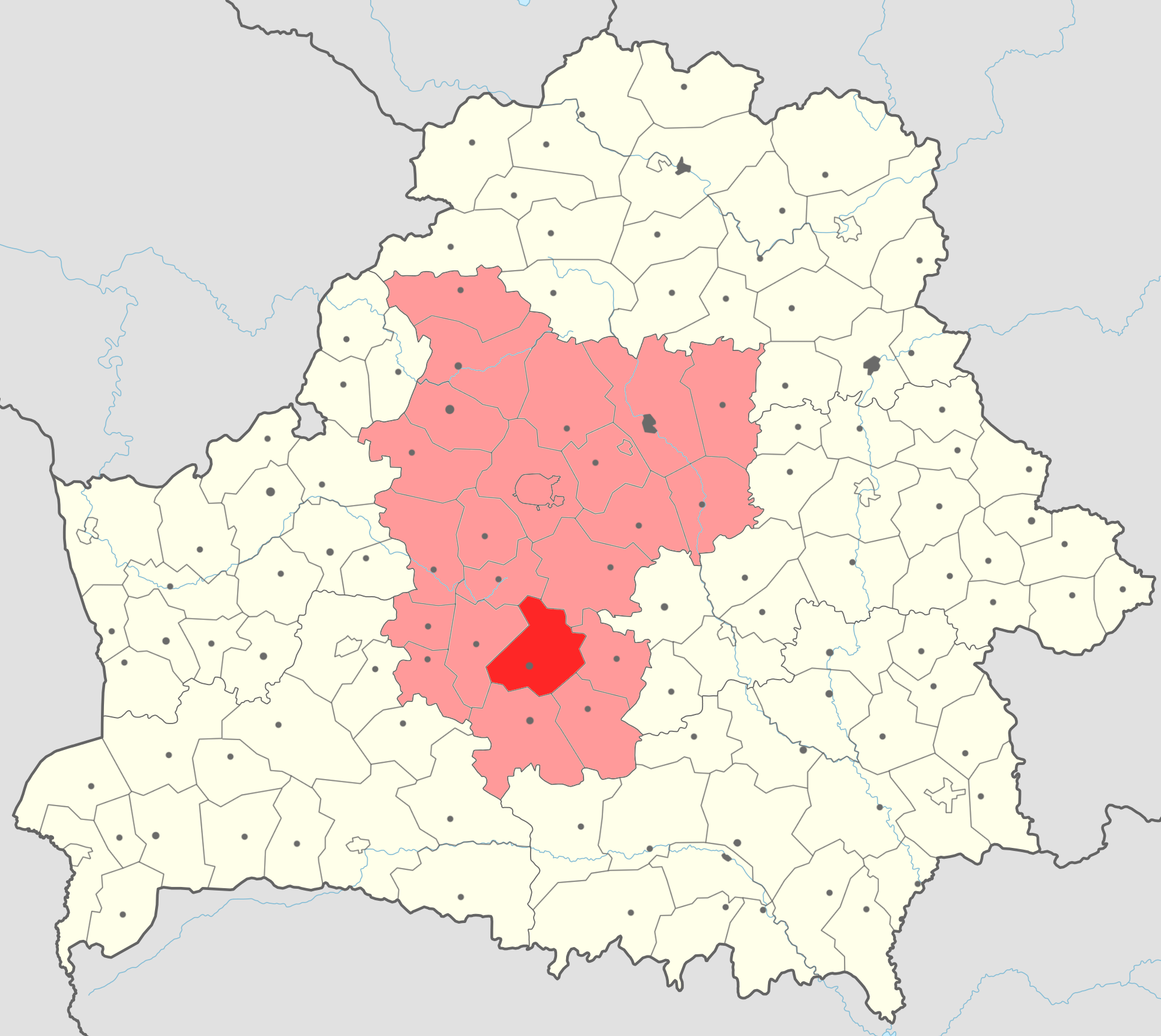
- Coordinates: 53°01′N 27°33′E
- Country: Belarus
- Region: Minsk region
- Administrative center: Slutsk

Area
  - District: 1,821 km^{2} (703 sq mi)

Population (2024)
  - District: 85,537
  - Density: 46.97/km^{2} (121.7/sq mi)
  - Urban: 60,056
  - Rural: 25,481
- Time zone: UTC+3 (MSK)

Slutsk district or Sluck district (Belarusian: Слуцкі раён; Russian: Слуцкий район) is a district (raion) of Minsk region in Belarus. Its administrative center is Slutsk. As of 2024, it has a population of 85,537.

== Settlements ==
- Talitsa

== Notable residents ==
- Alena Kish (1889 or 1896, Ramanava (now Lenina) village - 1949), Belarusian primitivist painter
- Jurka Listapad (1897, Varkavičy village - 1938), active participant in the Belarusian independence movement and anti-Soviet resistance, publicist and a victim of Stalin's purges of 1937–38.
- Mikola Statkevich (b. 1956, Liadna village), Belarusian politician and political prisoner
- Uladzimier Teraŭski (1871, the village of Ramanaŭ (currently known as the village of Lenin) - 1938), Belarusian composer, choirmaster and a victim of Stalin's purges. He wrote music to a number of popular Belarusian songs such as Vajacki Marš and Kupalinka
