= Pukhavichy district =

District of Minsk region, Belarus

Pukhavichy district Пухавіцкі раён (Belarusian) Пуховичский район (Russian)
- District
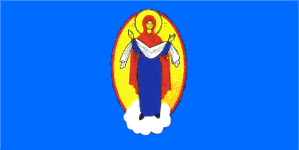
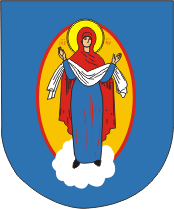
- Flag Coat of arms

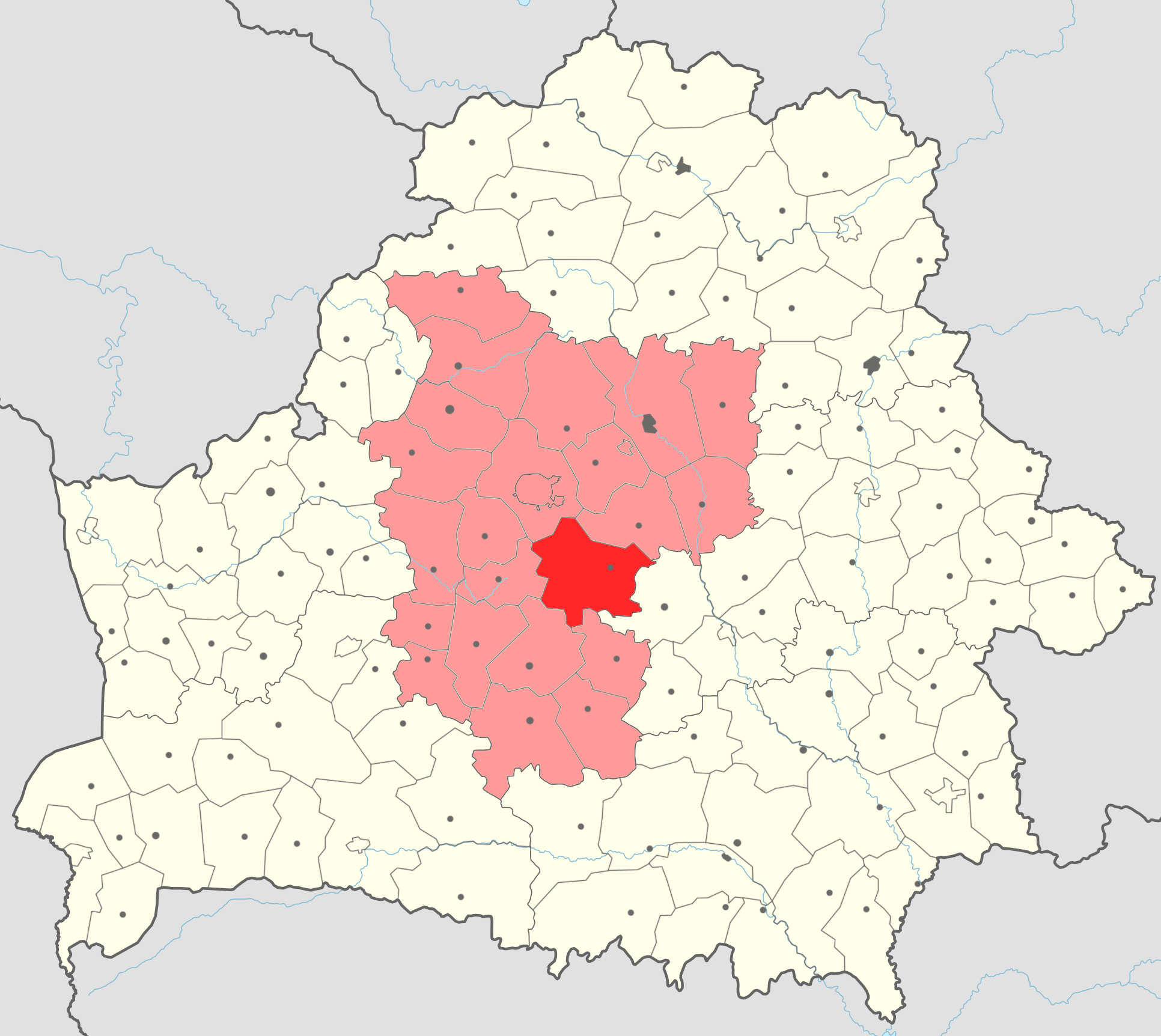
- Coordinates: 53°31′00″N 28°08′30″E
- Country: Belarus
- Region: Minsk region
- Administrative center: Maryina Horka

Area
  - District: 2,441 km^{2} (942 sq mi)

Population (2024)
  - District: 67,408
  - Urban: 28,560
  - Rural: 38,848
- Time zone: UTC+3 (MSK)
- Website: ispolkom website

Pukhavichy district or Puchavičy district (Belarusian: Пухавіцкі раён; Russian: Пуховичский район) is a district (raion) of Minsk region in Belarus. The administrative center of the district is the town of Maryina Horka. As of 2024, it has a population of 67,408.

== Geography ==
Main settlements

- Maryina Horka
- Svislach
- Rudzyensk
- Prawdzinski
- Shatsk
- Druzhny
- Pukhavichy

== Notable residents ==
- Michaś Čarot (1896, Rudzyensk - 1937), Belarusian poet, playwright, novelist, and a victim of Stalin's purges
- Aliaksandr Čarviakoŭ (1892, Dukorki village - 1937), Belarusian politician and publicist
- Hienadź Klaŭko (1931, Varoničy village – 1979), Belarusian poet and translator
- Daniel Charney (1889, Dukora – 1959), Yiddish poet, writer, and journalist
- Shmuel Charney (Niger) (1883, Dukora – 1955), Yiddish literary critic
- Baruch Charney Vladeck (1886, Dukora – 1938), Jewish labor leader, journalist, and politician

== List of chairmen ==
The following people held the post at various times.

- Siarhei Turko (Сергей Андреевич Турко)
- Fyodor Karalyenya (Федор Петрович Караленя)
