= Luchina (disambiguation) =

Luchina is a makeshift lighting implement

Luchina may also refer to:

- Luchina Fisher, American journalist and filmmaker
- Sergei Luchina, Russian football player
- Yanka Luchina or Janka Lučyna (1851-1897), Belarusian poet

== See also ==
- Lucina (disambiguation)
