= Biehła staroža =

Belarusian folk Christmas carol

"Бегла старожа"

Song
- Language: Belarusian
- English title: "The Guard Was Running"
- Written: Before 1885
- Genre: Folk, Christmas carol, Shchadrowka

Biehła staroža (Belarusian: Бегла старожа; "The Guard Was Running") is a Belarusian folk Christmas carol (shchadrowka). First recorded in the Homiel Region of Belarus, it gained international recognition after being featured in the soundtrack of the video game The Witcher 3: Wild Hunt, under the name The Song of the Sword-Dancer.

== Origins in Belarusian folklore ==
"Biehła staroža" is a shchadrowka, a traditional carol sung during the Christmas and New Year season. The song likely originated in the Belarusian region of Polesia.

The first written record of the song was made by folklorist Jeŭdakim Ramanaŭ in the village of Perarost (Homiel Uyezd) and published in his work Belarusian Collection: Songs, Proverbs, Riddles (1885). A similar version was recorded by Zinaida Radčanka in the same region and published in 1888. The prominent linguist Yefim Karsky mentioned the song in the third volume of his fundamental work Belarusians (1916), noting its connection to military life, as "staroža" in Old Belarusian meant a watch detachment or patrol.

The most widely known version, which became the basis for modern adaptations, was recorded by musicologist Lidzija Mucharynskaja in 1951 in the village of Azierščyna, Rečyca District, Homiel Region.

== Lyrics ==
The lyrics of the carol tell a story about a "guard" or "watchman" running from a field to warn a young man named Syarozha that Tatars have captured his beloved girl. Syarozha vows to defeat the Tatars with his sword and rescue the girl. The refrain "Dobry viečar!" (Good evening!) is repeated after each line.

The version recorded by Lidzija Mucharynskaja:

Belarusian lyrics

Бегла старожа з чыстага поля.
Добры вечар!
Як ударыла кап'ём у вароты.
— Малады Сярожа, ці спіш, ці ляжыш?
— Стружачкі стружу, кап'ё малюю.
— Пакінь маляваць да едзь ваяваць.
Ўжо ж тваю дзевачку татары ўзялі.
— Я ж тых татароў мячом пасяку.
Я ж тую дзевачку за сябе вазьму.

Transliteration

Biehla staroža z čystaha polia.
Dobry viečar!
Jak udaryla kapjom u varoty.
— Malady Siaroža, ci spiš, ci liažyš?
— Stružački stružu, kapjo maliuju.
— Pakiń maliavać da jedź vajavać.
Ŭžo ž tvaju dzievačku tatary ŭziali.
— Ja ž tych tataroŭ miačom pasiaku.
Ja ž tuju dzievačku za siabie vaźmu.

English translation

The guard was running from the clear field.
Good evening!
As he struck the gate with a spear.
— Young Syarozha, are you sleeping or lying down?
— I'm carving wood shavings, painting a spear.
— Stop painting and go to war.
The Tatars have already taken your girl.
— I will cut those Tatars down with my sword.
I will take that girl for myself.

== Modern adaptations ==
=== Pesniary ===
In 1985, Leanid Bartkievič, a soloist of the legendary Soviet Belarusian folk-rock band Pesniary, created a version of "Biehła staroža" with the band's signature arrangement. The lyrics were slightly modified and expanded.

=== Legends of the Grand Duchy ===
In 1999, a version of the song performed by Larysa Simakovič was included in the collaborative music project Legends of the Grand Duchy (Belarusian: Легенды Вялікага Княства), dedicated to the music of the Middle Ages and the Renaissance.

=== Percival Schuttenbach and The Witcher 3 ===
The song gained worldwide popularity through the Polish folk metal band Percival Schuttenbach. In 2007, they released a cover of the song under the title "Staroża" on their album Eiforr. According to the musicians, their interest in Belarusian folk music was sparked during a trip to Belarus around 2000, where they participated in an opposition march (likely the "Freedom March" against Belarus-Russia integration). They were deeply impressed by the authentic folk songs they heard and later collaborated with the Belarusian archaic singing group "Kniazhyč" from Navapolatsk. This collaboration led to the inclusion of several Belarusian folk songs in their repertoire.

The orchestral remix of Percival Schuttenbach's "Staroża" was included in the soundtrack for the highly successful video game The Witcher 3: Wild Hunt (2015) under the title "The Song of the Sword-Dancer". The song, often associated with combat sequences, became one of the most recognizable tracks from the game. With over 50 million copies of the game sold by 2023, the Belarusian carol has been heard by a massive international audience. The lyrics in the game version are slightly altered:

Belarusian lyrics

Бегла старожа з чыстага поля
Добры вечар
Як ударыла дзідай у вароты
...
— Не спі, не ляжы, на вайну ідзі!
Ужо ж тваю дзевачку хазары ўзялі!
— Я ж тых хазароў мячом пасяку!
Я ж ту дзевачку за сябе вазьму.
— Малады Сярожка, ці спіш, ці ляжыш?
— Не сплю, не ляжу, сам сабе стражу.

Transliteration

Biehla staroža z čystaha polia
Dobry viečar
Jak udaryla dzidaj u varoty
...
Nie splu, nie liažu, na vajnu jedziem
...
Užo ž tvaju dzievačku chazary ŭziali!
Ja ž tych chazaroŭ miačom pasiaku
Ja ž tuju dzievačku za siabie vaźmu!

English translation

The guard was running from the clear field
Good evening
As he struck the gate with a spear
...
I don't sleep, I don't lie, we're going to war
...
The Khazars have already taken your girl!
I will cut those Khazars down with my sword
I will take that girl for myself!

== See also ==
- Music of Belarus
- Shchedryk (another famous carol)

== Bibliography ==
- Зыкава Л. В. [Zykava L. V.], ed. (2012). Хрэстаматыя па беларускай народнай музычнай творчасці [Anthology of Belarusian Folk Musical Creativity] (in Belarusian). Minsk: Інстытут культуры Беларусі [Belarusian Institute of Culture]. p. 208.
- Цітовіч Г. [Tsitovich G.], ed. (1975). Анталогія беларускай народнай песні [Anthology of Belarusian Folk Song] (in Belarusian). Minsk: Беларусь [Belarus]. p. 615.
