= Ethnic territory of Belarusians =

Territory of compact settlement of the Belarusian people

Ethnic territory of Belarusians (Belarusian: Этнічная тэрыторыя беларусаў) is the territory of compact settlement of Belarusians as an ethnos. The ethnogenesis of Belarusians and their ethnic history are closely tied to this territory. The geographical environment constituting the ethnic territory is not only the living space of the people but also the vital foundation that determines the specifics of their material culture (economic activities, settlement types, spatial contacts) and spiritual culture.

== Formation of the ethnic territory in the Grand Duchy of Lithuania ==
Modern Belarusian academic science (Vasil Bandarchyk, Mikhail Pilipenka, Ihar Chakvin, and others) considers that the process of Belarusian ethnogenesis began in the 13th–14th centuries within the Grand Duchy of Lithuania and became distinctly realized in the 14th–15th centuries. The formation of the Belarusian ethnos (in the Pripyat, Upper Neman, Upper Western Dvina, and Upper Dnieper regions) involved a significant portion of East Slavs ("Rus"), certain groups of West Slavs (primarily Poles who mostly settled in Polesia), and non-Slavic ethnic groups, especially Balts (Lithuanians, Yotvingians, Prussians, Samogitians), many of whom were forced migrants to these areas. The East Slavic population formed the mass foundation of the Belarusians, while the non-East Slavic groups acted as an additional component of this new ethnic community.

The modern self-designation "Belarusians" definitively entrenched itself across the entire ethnic territory only from the mid-1860s (and firmly among the broad masses from the 1890s). This creates difficulties in delineating the ethnic territory and demographic indicators in preceding eras. Prior to this, two main self-designations were used: "Ruthenians" (Rusins) and "Lithuanians" (Litvins).

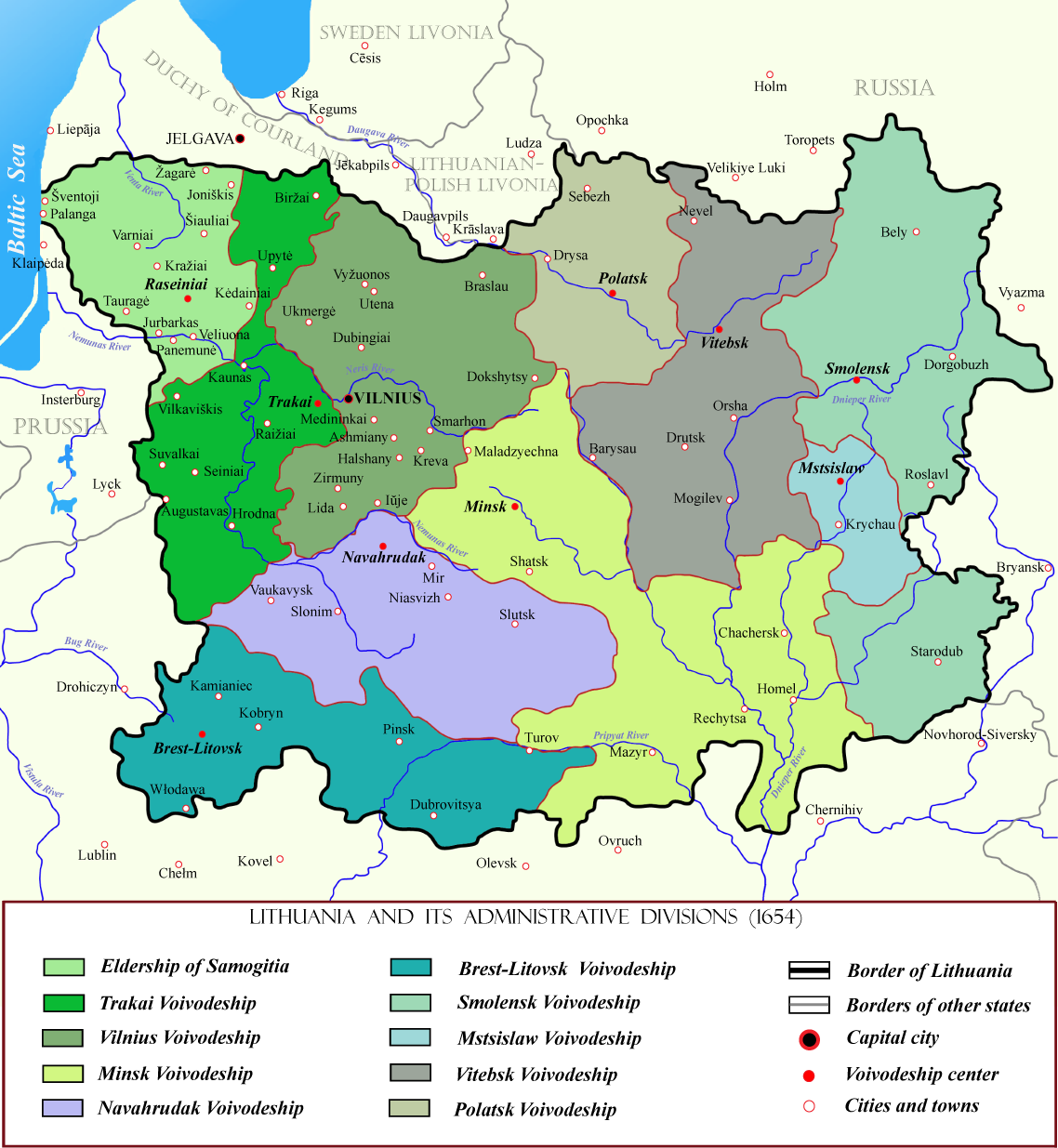
Administrative-territorial division of the Grand Duchy of Lithuania in the 17th century.

In the 14th–16th centuries in the GDL (and later in the Polish–Lithuanian Commonwealth), alongside the name "Rusins", the self-designation "Litvins" was used in several regions of Belarusian settlement (primarily in the western and southern regions of modern Belarus and eastern regions of modern Lithuania, even applying to the Slavicized Baltic population of those lands). The terms "Rus" primarily denoted the population of the eastern and central regions of modern Belarus and were closely associated with Russian Orthodoxy. A complex hierarchical system of self-designations existed, including polytonyms, toponyms (regional and local names, including urbanonyms), confessionyms, and ethnonyms. It is often difficult to determine whether "Litvins" was understood by speakers as an ethnonym, toponym, confessionym (denoting a Catholic), or polytonym. This led to combined self-identifications (e.g., "Litvins of the Greek faith", "Litvins of Russian descent", "Russian princes of Lithuanian descent", Gente Lithuanus, natione Polonus). The toponym "White Rus'" and the ethnonym "Belarustsy", which emerged in the late 16th–17th centuries, did not cover the entire Belarusian massif but were local-territorial designations, initially referring primarily to the Polotsk region. Under the influence of the Muscovite State and the Orthodox activists in the Commonwealth, these terms began to be used more widely from the 1630s for the Dvina and Dnieper voivodeships, though they still lagged behind "Rus" and "Rusins". By the 17th century, "Lithuania" and "Litvins" were firmly used to denote the western and central parts of the GDL, remaining in use until the Partitions of Poland and beyond.

A separate position is held by Belarusian historian Igor Marzalyuk, who asserts that an ethnos without a common self-designation is a "nonsense." He disputes that "Litvin" was an ethnic self-designation for Belarusians, arguing that "Rusin" was the sole endoethnonym for all parts of the Old Belarusian ethnos, paralleling Orthodoxy (and later the Uniate church). Marzalyuk associates "Litvins" exclusively with Baltic Lithuanians and Catholicism, viewing it only as a polytonym for Belarusians. He suggests that religious division matched ethnic division (Catholics = Lithuanians; Orthodox = Rusins), denying Baltic participation in Belarusian ethnogenesis. (Note: The opinion that in the initial period of the GDL, religious division largely coincided with ethnic division was previously expressed by Polish historian Jerzy Ochmański.) Marzalyuk believes that the widespread adoption of the self-designation "Poles" alongside "Litvins" by the nobility in the 17th century meant their inclusion into the Polish ethnos. He proposes reviving the artificial, "cabinet" term "Old Belarusian ethnos" to distinguish Belarusians from Ukrainians in the GDL. However, Marzalyuk also concludes that the creators of the Belarusian-centric historical concept in the 19th century were actually Catholic nobles (e.g., Osip Turchynovich, Ignat Kulakovski, and later writers like Francišak Bahuševič and Yanka Luchyna), not Orthodox peasants. (Note: It is notable that the creators of the new Belarusian-language literature in the 19th century were exclusively Catholic nobles (Vintsent Dunin-Martsinkyevich, Francišak Bahuševič, Adam Hurynovich, Yanka Luchyna, Karus Kahanets, Ciotka, etc.), not Orthodox priests or peasants.)

Marzalyuk's thesis of a single endoethnonym was challenged by historian Hienadź Sahanovič, who noted that Belarusians belonged to different Christian denominations, hindering a single ethnonym and ethnic consolidation. Historian Ales Smalyanchuk criticized Marzalyuk for taking quotes out of context to prove the ethnic Polishness of the Lithuanian nobility. Furthermore, contrary to Marzalyuk's claim that Catholic populations in Western Belarus and the Vilnius region were purely Baltic Lithuanians who only assimilated in the 19th-20th centuries, ethnologist Mikhail Hrynblat claimed that there was intensive Belarusization of Balts in the 14th–16th centuries. Ihar Chakvin also notes that the Slavicization of the Upper Neman region is confirmed by ancient Slavic toponymy and that Vilnius possessed a large Orthodox population (12 Orthodox churches vs. 6 Catholic churches at the end of the 14th century).

== Conceptions during the Russian Empire ==
=== Confessional approach ===
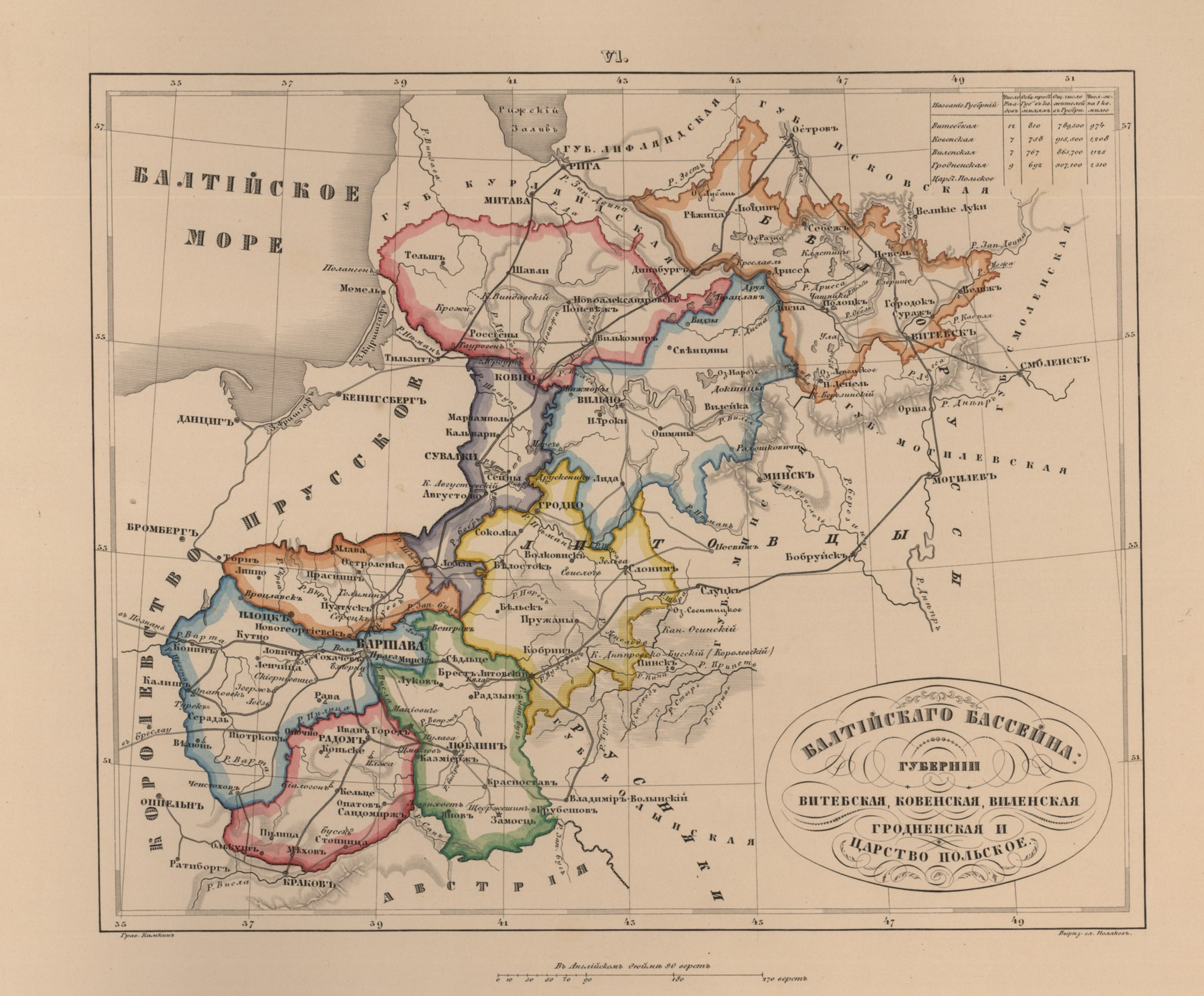
Map from the "Geographical Atlas of the Russian Empire" (1851). The habitat of "Belarusians" encompasses only the Vitebsk and Mogilev governorates, while Vilnius, Grodno, and Minsk governorates are shown as the habitat of "Lithuanians", reflecting the early 19th-century toponymic division.

After annexing the lands of the GDL, the Russian imperial administration retained the geographical terminology of the GDL (Samogitia–Lithuania–White Rus). Only the Dnieper and Dvina lands were termed "Belarusian" (forming the Belarusian Governorate-General). The rest of the Belarusian ethnic territory (including the Minsk region) was toponymically called "Lithuania" or "Lithuanian governorates" until the early 1870s. Up to the 1860s, parts of the Vilnius governorate were even officially called "Samogitian uyezds". On December 18, 1842, the predominantly Baltic-speaking uyezds were separated from Vilnius to form the Kovno Governorate, unofficially called "Samogitia".

Following the abolition of the Uniate Church in 1839, the government began using the term "Northwestern Krai" (Northwestern governorates) to emphasize the "Russian" ethnoconfessional character of the region, though informal use of "Lithuania" persisted. From the 1850s, Russia intensively gathered ethnographic material. Driven by the imperial ideology of West Russianism (zapadnorusizm), authorities sought to extend the term "Belorussia" to all territories that were once part of Kievan Rus', even if they were Catholic and currently called "Lithuanian". The forced conversion of Catholics and Uniates to Orthodoxy was accompanied by using religion and language as markers of "Russianness".

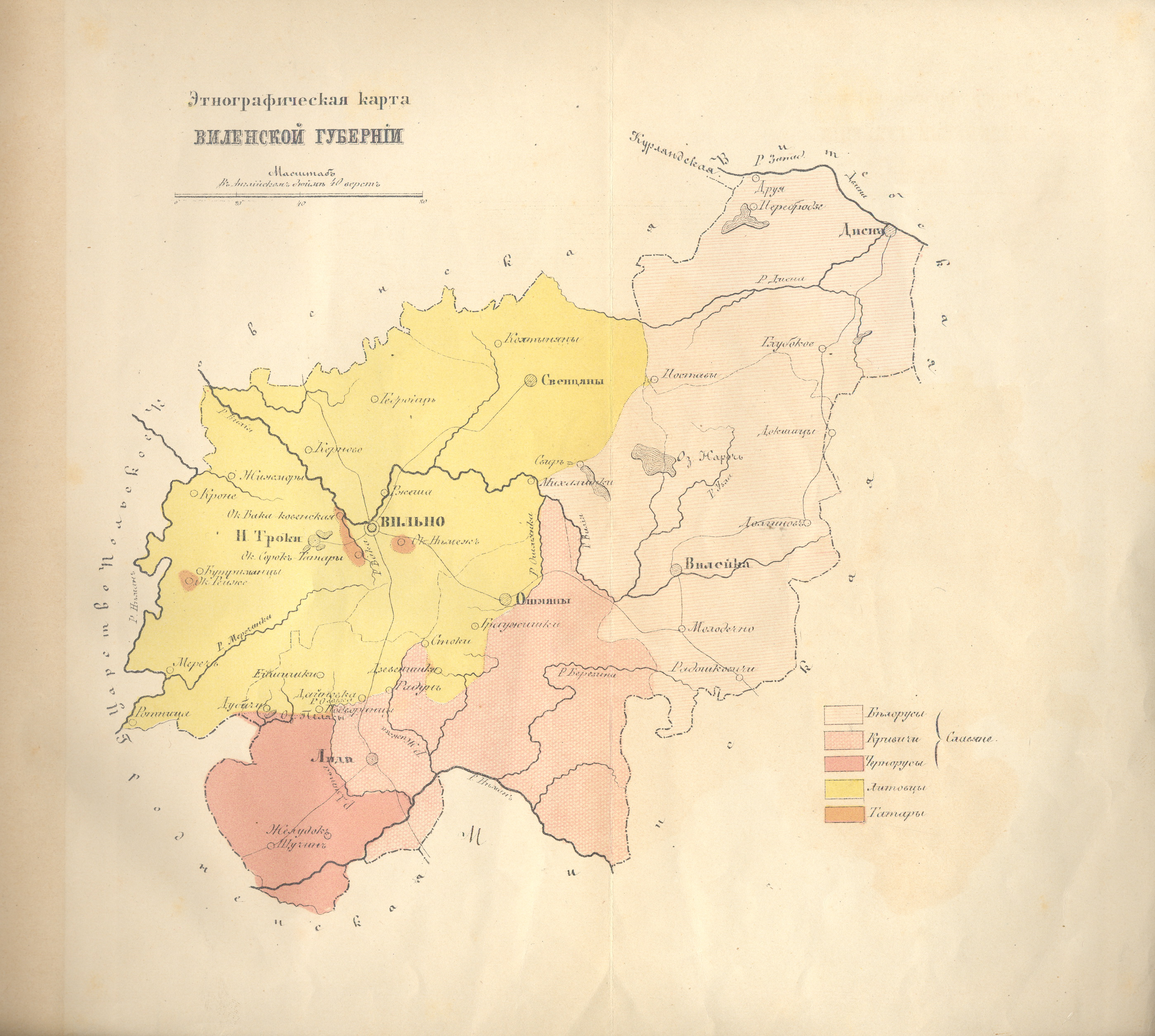
A politically driven ethnographic map of the Vilnius Governorate by A. Koreva (1861). The border between Lithuanians and non-Lithuanians was drawn primarily on confessional lines: Catholics were automatically assigned to Lithuanians, while Orthodox were assigned to Slavic Belarusians, Kryvichs, and Black Ruthenians.

In his 1853 work, Adam Kirkor mapped the boundary between the "Slavic" and "Lithuanian" tribes in the Vilnius Governorate based largely on ancient toponymy, placing Vilnius (Vilnius) within the Lithuanian zone. However, Kirkor wrote that Lithuanian was dominant only in the Trakai uyezd, while in others it yielded to the Belarusian language. He noted that Lithuanians were mostly Catholics, and Belarusian speakers were Orthodox (former Uniates).

Similarly, an 1861 Russian General Staff compilation by Captain A. Koreva followed Kirkor's toponymic boundary but also noted that peasants around Vilnius and Trakai spoke Belarusian despite being Catholic. Researchers later noted that in the 1850s, Russian ethnography drew the border purely on confessional lines: Catholic equaled "Lithuanian", and Orthodox equaled Slav, purposefully excluding the Catholic Vilnius region from the Belarusian ethnic territory.

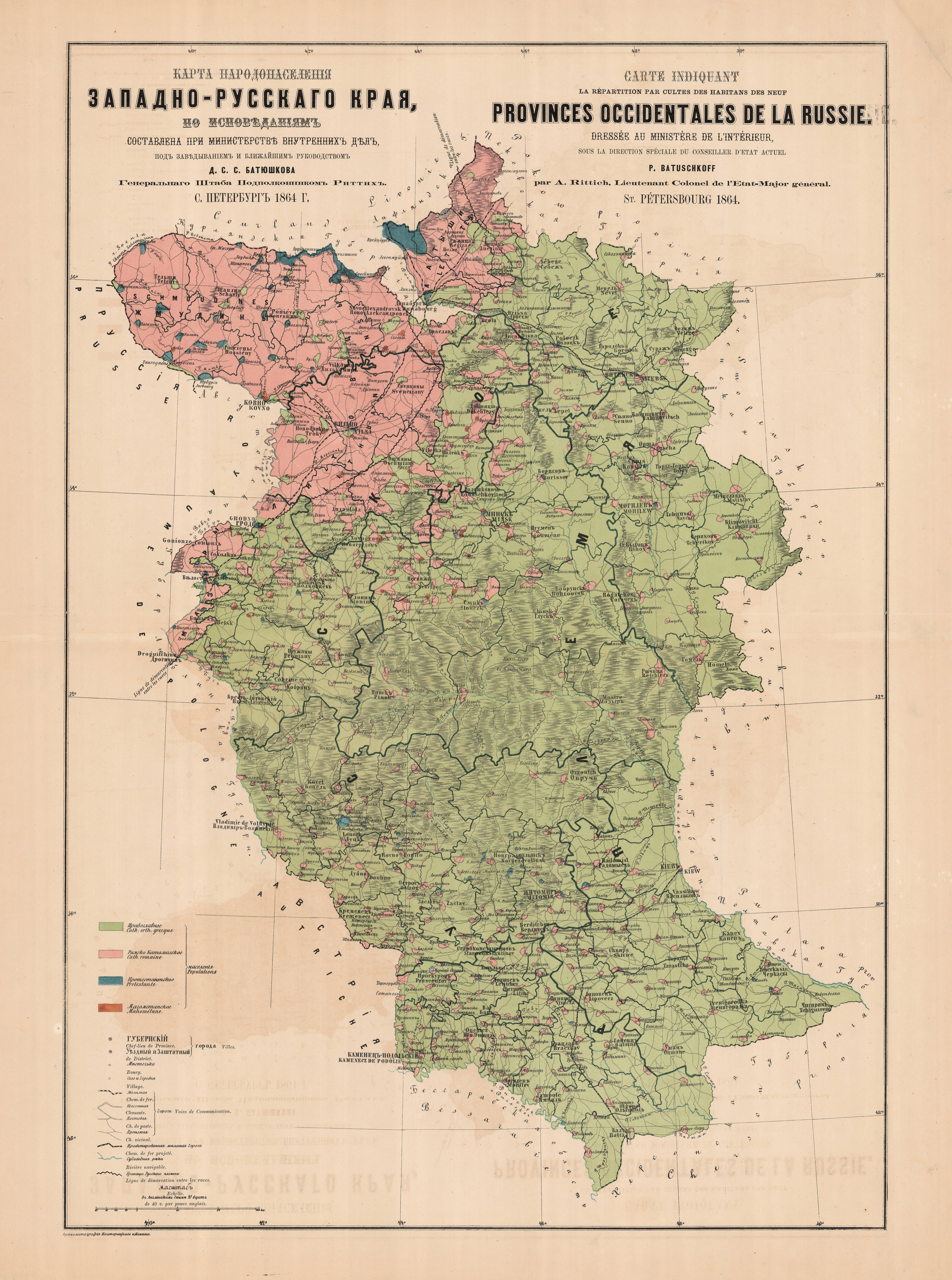
Map of the "Western Krai" by Alexander Rittich (1864), where Orthodox ("Russian tribe") are in green and Catholics in dark pink.

During and after the suppression of the January Uprising (1863–1864), the Russian government published tendentious ethnographic atlases by Aleksandr Rittikh (1863, 1864) and Roderich von Erckert (1864) for propaganda purposes. To prove the "Russianness" of the lands, Orthodox inhabitants were classified as "Russian", and Catholic nobles as "Poles". Erckert and Rittich relied solely on confession, artificially inflating Orthodox numbers.

According to Erckert's atlas, the Belarusian territory covered Mogilev, Vitebsk, part of Vilnius, and Grodno governorates. He divided Belarusians into three groups:

1. "True Belarusians" (Vitebsk, Mogilev, eastern Minsk, western Smolensk); (Note: The term "True Belarusians" was likely used because from 1772 to 1863, Vitebsk and Mogilev governorates were traditionally the only ones toponymically called "Belarusian".)
2. "Black Russians" (western Minsk, northern Grodno), noting that they didn't use this name themselves;
3. "Podlasians" (western Grodno).

He categorized southern Grodno and Minsk governorates as "Little Russians" (Ukrainians) based on dialect similarity.

=== Linguistic approach ===
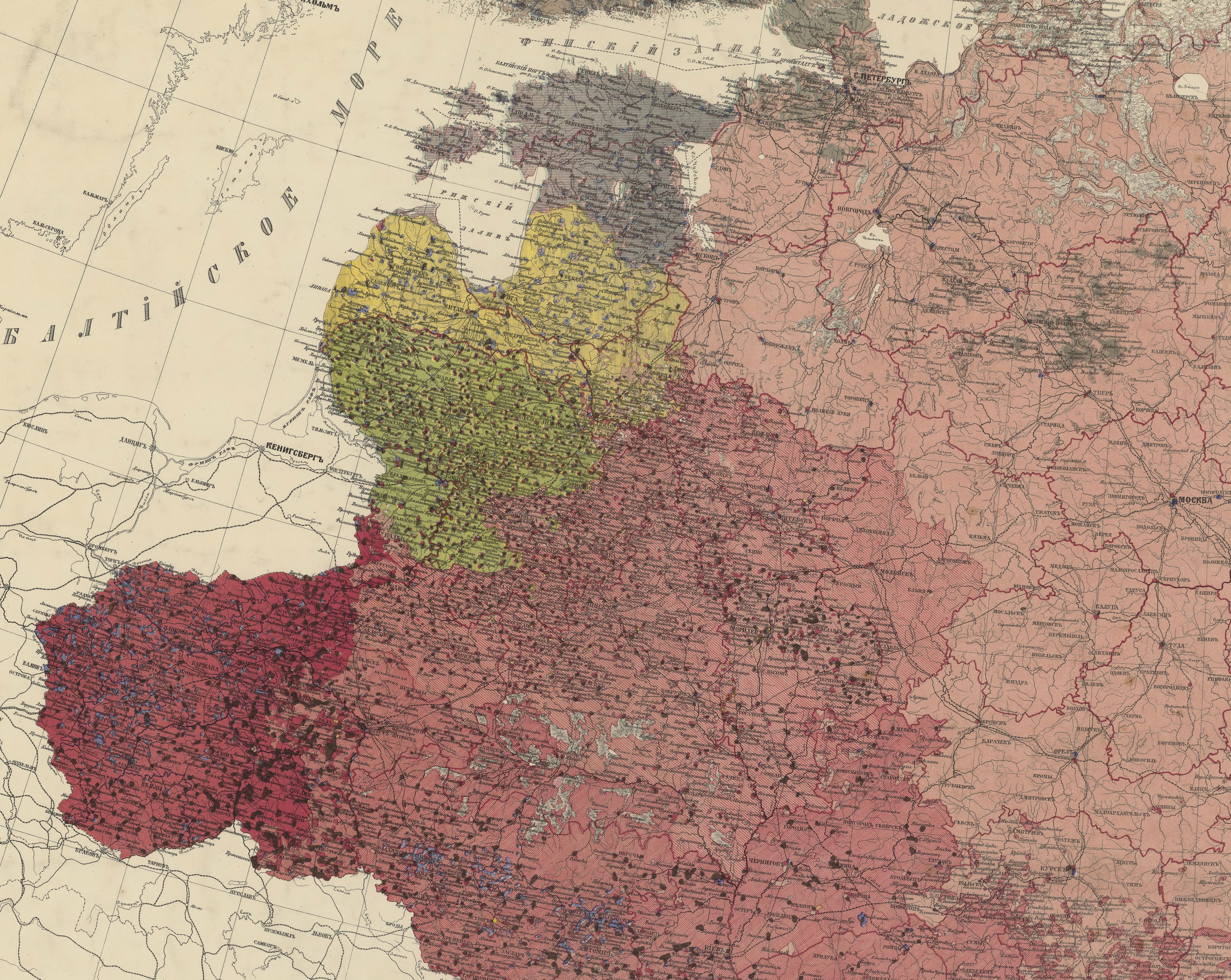
Belarusians (center, beige/green) on Alexander Rittich's 1875 "Ethnographic Map of European Russia", based on the linguistic criterion.

Only from the 1880s did language become the primary marker for ethnic identification in the Russian Empire. In 1875, Aleksandr Rittikh compiled the "Ethnographic Map of European Russia" based entirely on the linguistic criterion. The map delineated the Belarusian settlement west and south of Suwałki, along the Narew, Yaselda, and Pripyat rivers, and north/east past Vilnius, Švenčionys, Ludza, Velikiye Luki, west of Vyazma and Mglin. A distinct feature was the inclusion of the Catholic Vilnius region into the Belarusian ethnic territory based on language.

In 1870, the Minsk Governorate was separated from the Vilnius Governorate-General, and soon became toponymically associated with "Belorussia" as well. By the 1890s, the name "Belorussia" firmly extended to Grodno and most of the Vilnius Governorate, aided heavily by linguistic studies by Ivan Nasovich, Pavel Shein, Yevdokim Romanov, and, definitively, by Yefim Karsky's monumental work "Belarusians" (1903, 1908).

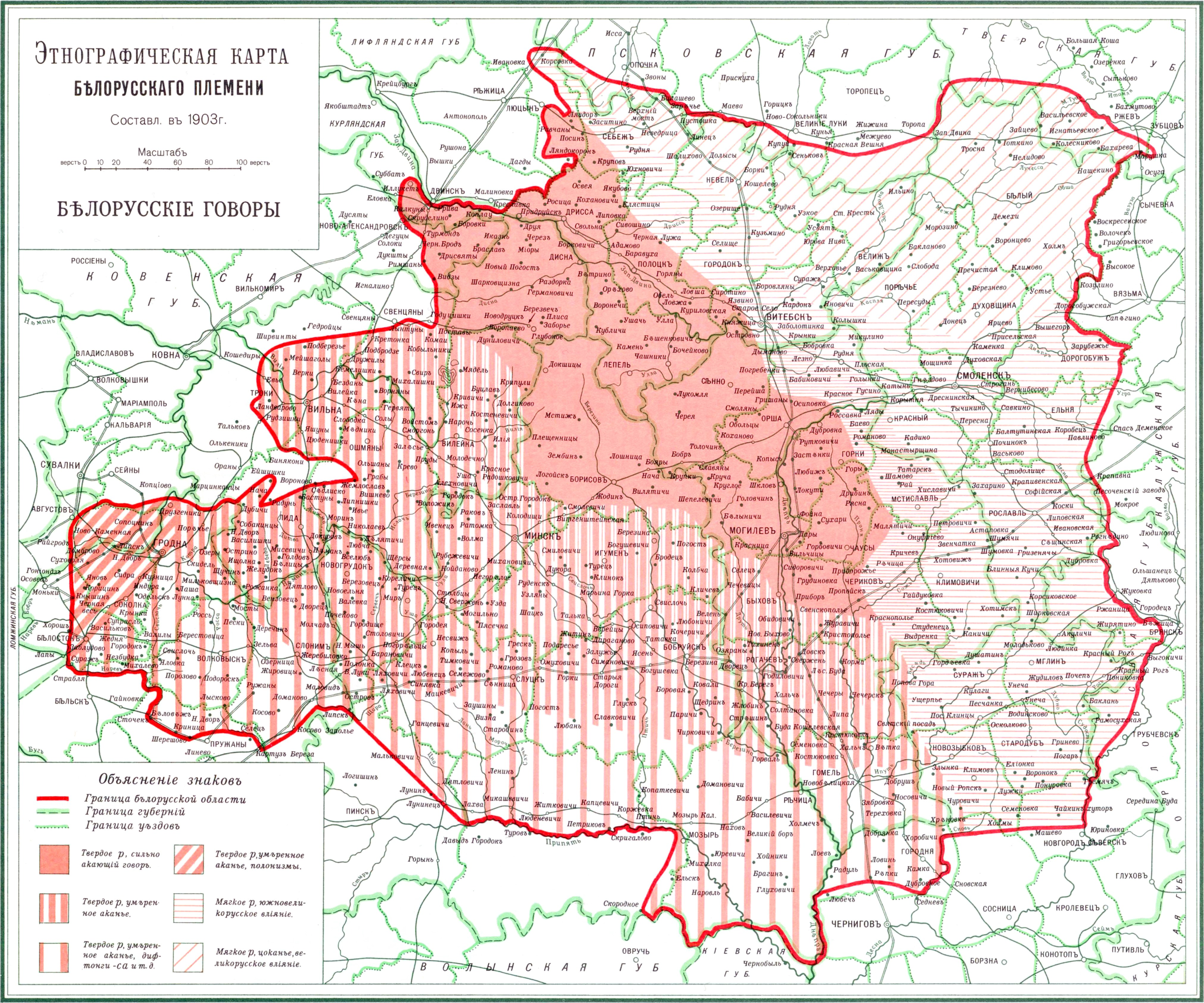
Yefim Karsky's 1903 "Ethnographic map of the Belarusian tribe" (based on the linguistic criterion).

Linguistic studies showed similarities in the dialects of peasants across the five Northwestern governorates, extending east to Rzhev and Bryansk in the Smolensk and Chernigov governorates. Karsky's map largely corresponded to the ancient lands of the Krivichs. However, in official imperial ideology, these Belarusian speakers were still considered a branch of the "Triune Russian nation".

The Moscow Dialectological Commission (1915) also mapped these dialects, expanding the Belarusian language area even further into the Chernigov and Kaluga governorates, while classifying Western Polesia as a transitional zone between Belarusian and Ukrainian.

=== Results of the 1897 Census ===
The Russian Empire census (1897) did not ask about ethnic identity (narodnost), but only about native language and religion. According to the census, those indicating Belarusian as their native language constituted 82.4% in the Mogilev Governorate, 76% in Minsk, 56% in Vilnius, 52.9% in Vitebsk, and 44% in Grodno.

- Vilnius Governorate: Belarusian speakers dominated in Vileyka (86.4%), Dzisna (80.7%), Ashmyany (79.6%), and Lida (72.4%) uyezds. In Vilnius uyezd it was 26% (dominating the rural areas around the city), while in the city of Vilnius itself it was 4.3% (where Yiddish at 40% and Polish at 30.1% dominated).
- Vitebsk Governorate: Drissa (86.2%), Velizh (85.7%), Nevel (84%), Haradok (83.6%), Lepel (82%), Polotsk (73.1%) uyezds.
- Grodno Governorate: Sokółka (83.8%), Vawkavysk (82.4%), Slonim (80.7%), Pruzhany (75.5%) uyezds.
- Chernigov Governorate: Surazh (68.7%), Mglin (14.1%) uyezds.
- Smolensk Governorate: 100,700 people indicated Belarusian (6.6% of the province), heavily concentrated in the Krasny uyezd (90%). The overall low percentage in Smolensk is attributed to the rapid Russification of peasants in primary schools.

In total, 5.71 million people declared Belarusian as their native language. The census revealed that phonetic dialect features did not always equate to ethnic identity. For instance, in the Smolensk governorate, peasants retained Belarusian phonetic traits but identified with the Russian ethnos due to everyday informal ties with the local Russian Orthodox nobility and clergy, an assimilation that had occurred by the 18th century. Conversely, in Western Polesia (previously mapped as Ukrainian-speaking), 74.3% in Pinsk and 75.5% in Pruzhany declared Belarusian as their native language in 1897. By 1910–1913, local statistics showed the population in Kobryn and Pruzhany overwhelmingly identifying as Belarusian (over 85%), reflecting a process of "Belarusization" of consciousness as local clergy and officials recognized their flock as closer to Belarusians than Ukrainians.

== Conceptions in Western European Science ==
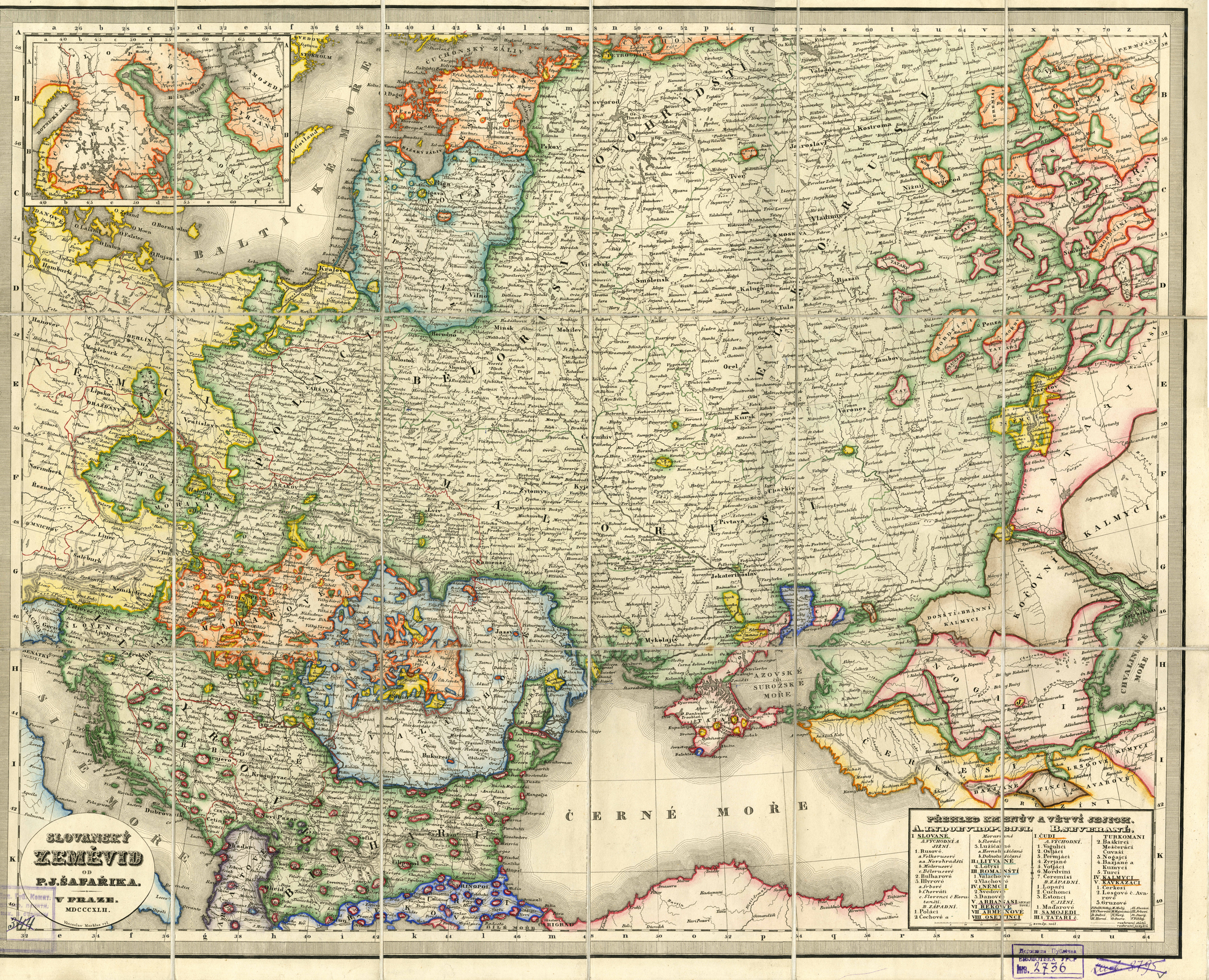
Map of Slavic peoples compiled by Pavel Jozef Šafárik (1842).

In 1827, Russian ethnographer Peter von Köppen attempted to delineate the Slavic and Baltic populations, but his manuscript remained unpublished. Czech Slavist Pavel Jozef Šafárik utilized Köppen's data for his "Slavic Ethnography" (Prague, 1842). Based on language, Šafárik mapped the Belarusian territory, estimating 2,726,000 Belarusians (2,376,000 Orthodox and 350,000 Catholics). He identified two sub-dialects: "Belarusian proper" (Mogilev, Vitebsk) and "Lithuanian-Russian" (Minsk, Grodno, Vilnius). Lacking exact data for the eastern and southern borders, Šafárik largely followed the pre-1772 borders of the GDL.

== Ethnic territory after 1917 ==
Linguistic situation in the Vilnius region in the early 20th century according to Lithuanian linguist Aloyzas Vidugiris. Pink: Belarusian-speaking, Green: Lithuanian, Yellow: Polish.

After the fall of the Russian Empire in 1917, national movements sought political self-determination. This actualized the scientific concretization of ethnic borders, sparking ideological struggles between Belarusians, Lithuanians, Ukrainians, Poles, and Russians over the former Northwestern Krai.

Maps compiled in 1918 and 1919 by Mitrofan Dovnar-Zapolsky and Yausey Kanchar, based primarily on linguistics, included all of Western Polesia in the Belarusian territory. Dovnar-Zapolsky expanded the borders into parts of the Lomzha, Chernigov, and Orel governorates (totaling 258,000 km^{2} with 12 million Belarusians). Kanchar pushed even further east, claiming the entirety of Smolensk Governorate, parts of Kaluga and Tver governorates, and the "Livonian uyezds" of Vitebsk Governorate. In 1918, the Belarusian People's Republic (BNR) declared its state borders based on Dovnar-Zapolsky's map.

A different perspective was held by the conservative Krajowcy movement (led by Edward Woyniłłowicz), who sought political subjectivity strictly within the six Northwestern governorates. They rejected the national-democrats' claims to Smolensk, Pskov, and Kaluga, arguing Belarusians were a minority there. Woyniłłowicz argued the real ethnic border between Belarus and Russia was the pre-1772 GDL border. He asserted the fundamental difference was cultural and economic: the eastern border of Belarus ended where "individual ownership ends, and communal ("obshchina") ownership begins." Following the 1863 uprising, the Russian government forced the transition of peasants in the western governorates to full private ownership, destroying the peasant commune. Meanwhile, Russian peasants in the central governorates (like Smolensk) remained bound to collective land ownership until the Stolypin reform, a stark civilizational divide. Woyniłłowicz also believed that Vilnius should remain in a Belarusian state, as Lithuanians were virtually absent from the city and Belarusians dominated the surrounding region.

Ethnologist Andrei Rayuk notes that the boundary between Belarusian and Russian ethnic territories did not change significantly between the late 18th and early 20th centuries, aligning with the 1772 borders. The local Catholic nobility maintained informal networks that preserved the ethnic boundary. The imperial policies of isolation and the distinct economic realities imposed on the region inadvertently conserved the behavioral stereotypes of the Belarusian ethnos.

== Maps ==
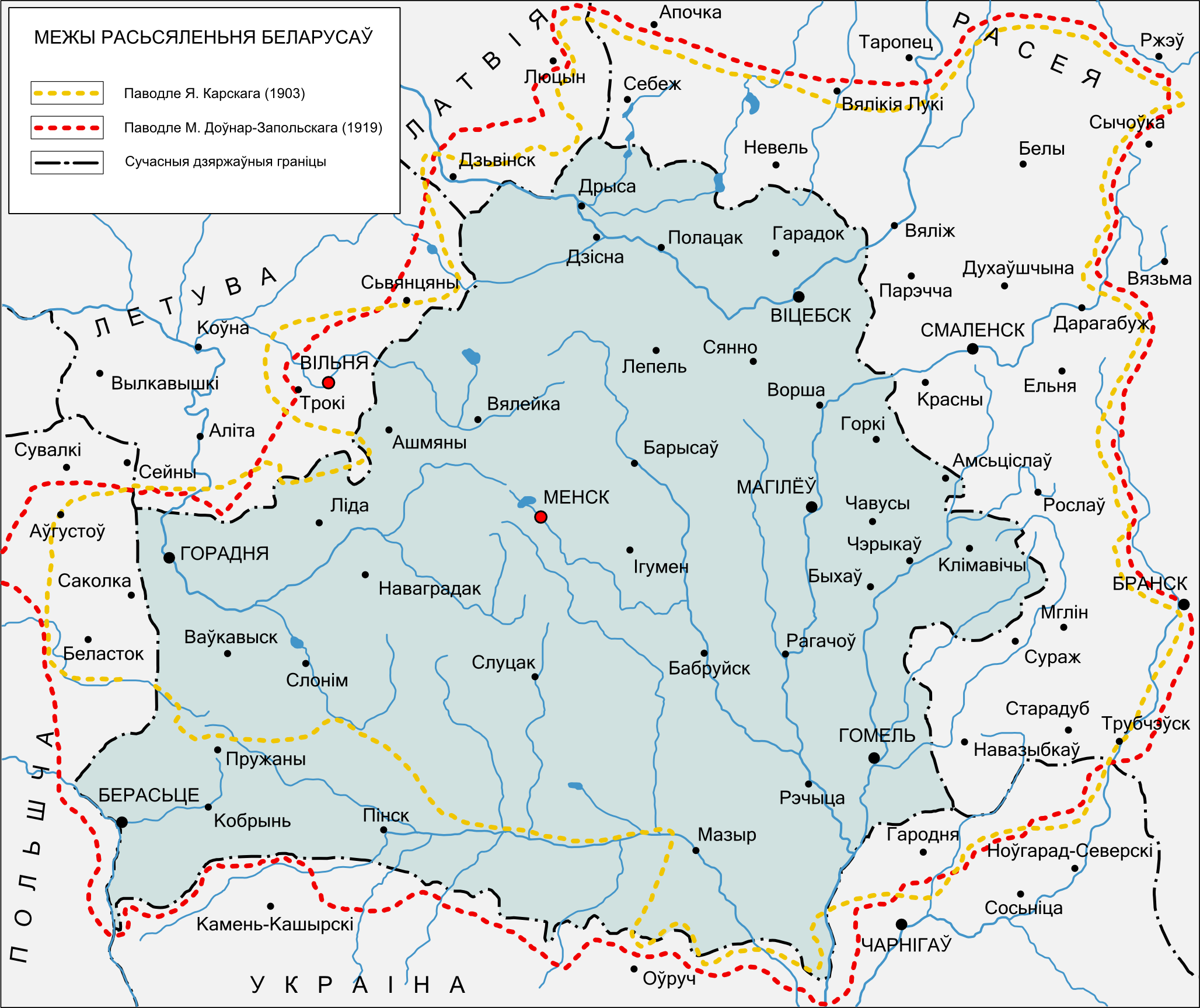
Borders of Belarusian ethnic territory according to Yefim Karsky (1903), Mitrofan Dovnar-Zapolsky (1919), and the borders of the Republic of Belarus (1991).

Borders of the Belarusian People's Republic (BNR), declared in 1918 based on Dovnar-Zapolsky's works.

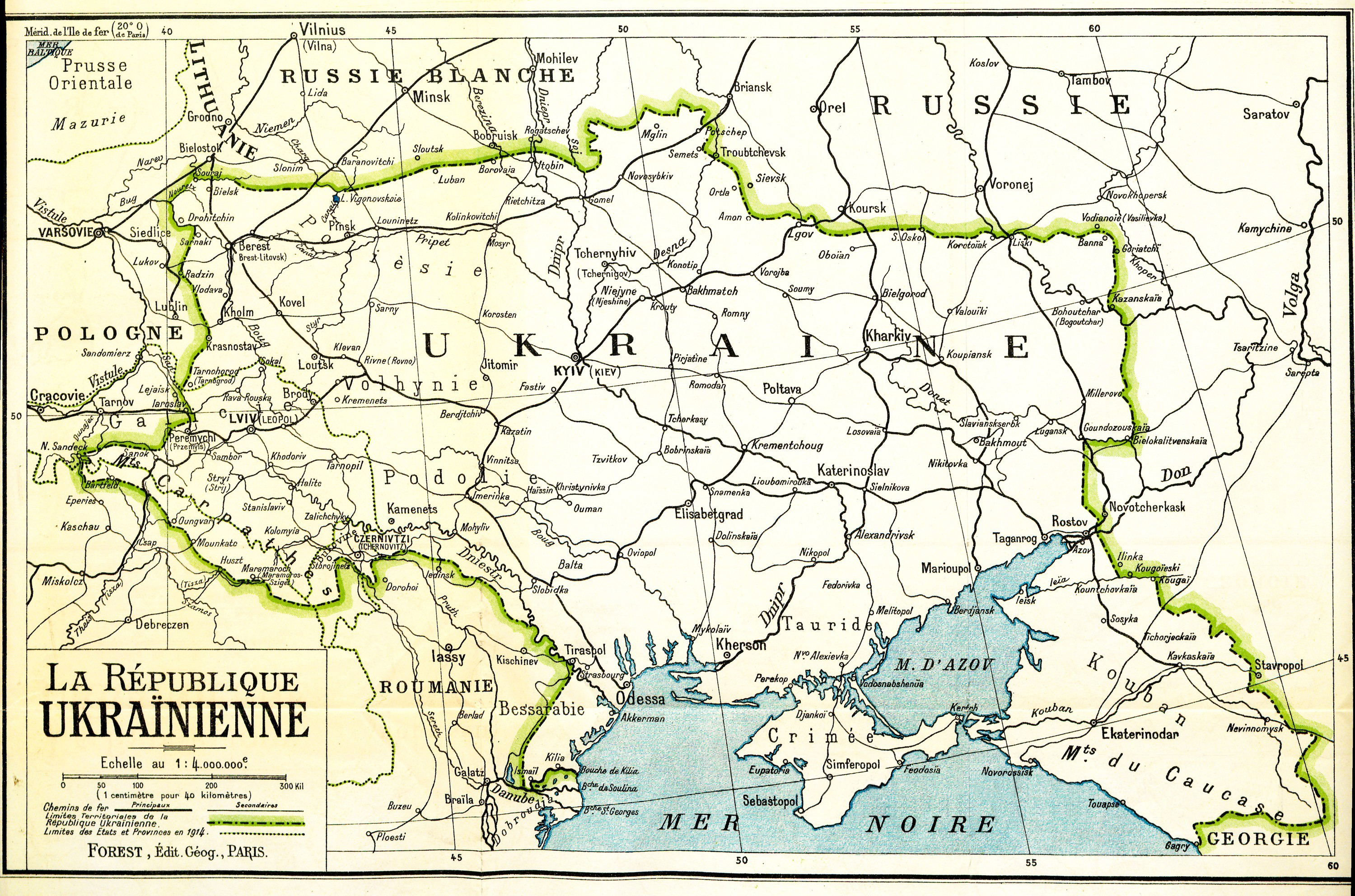
Borders of Ukraine claimed by the Ukrainian People's Republic at the Paris Peace Conference (1919–1920).

"Ethnographic Map of Europe" published in 1918 by the Lithuanian national movement in Lausanne.

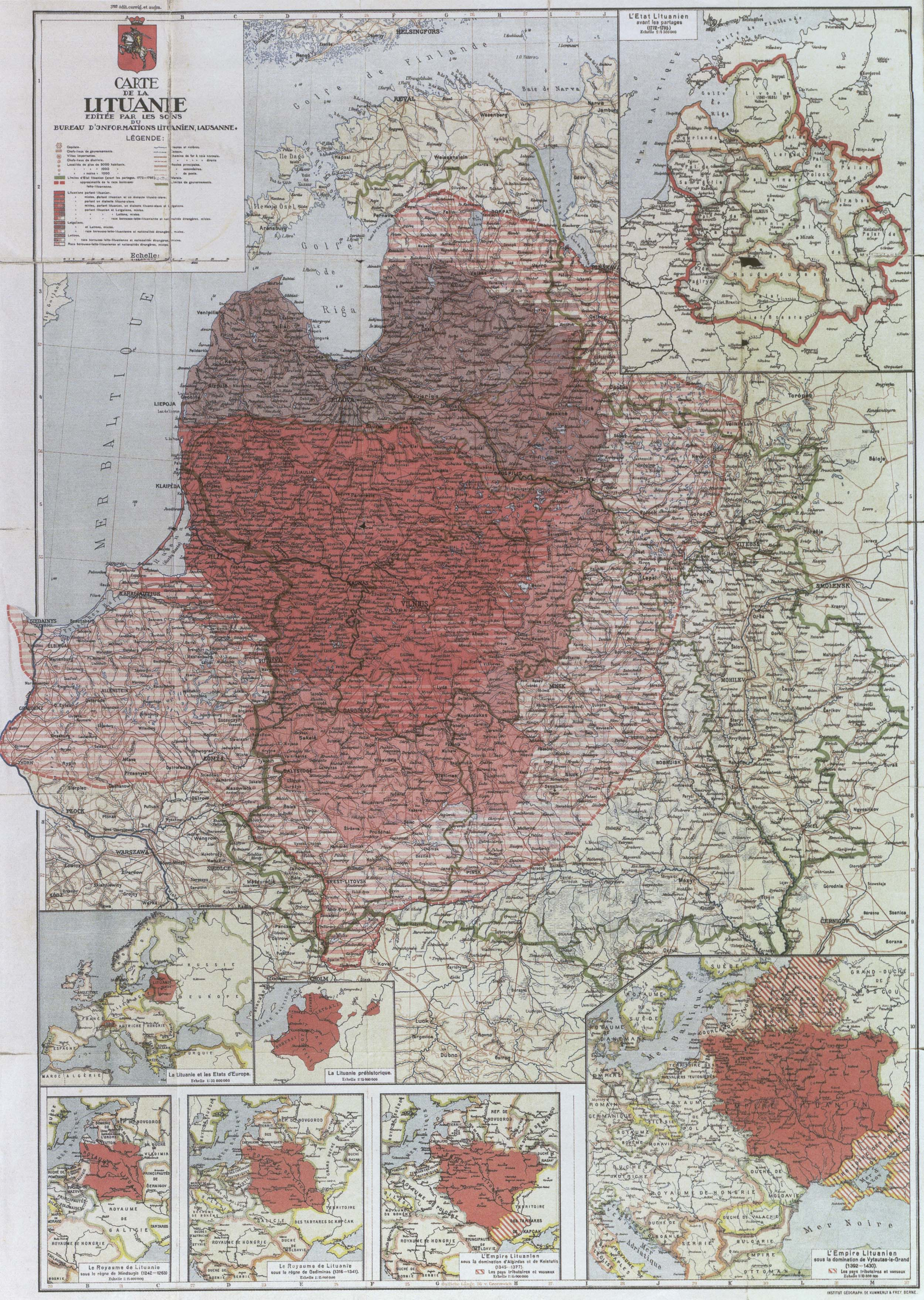
"Map of Lithuania" (1918) proposing borders for the Lithuanian republic.

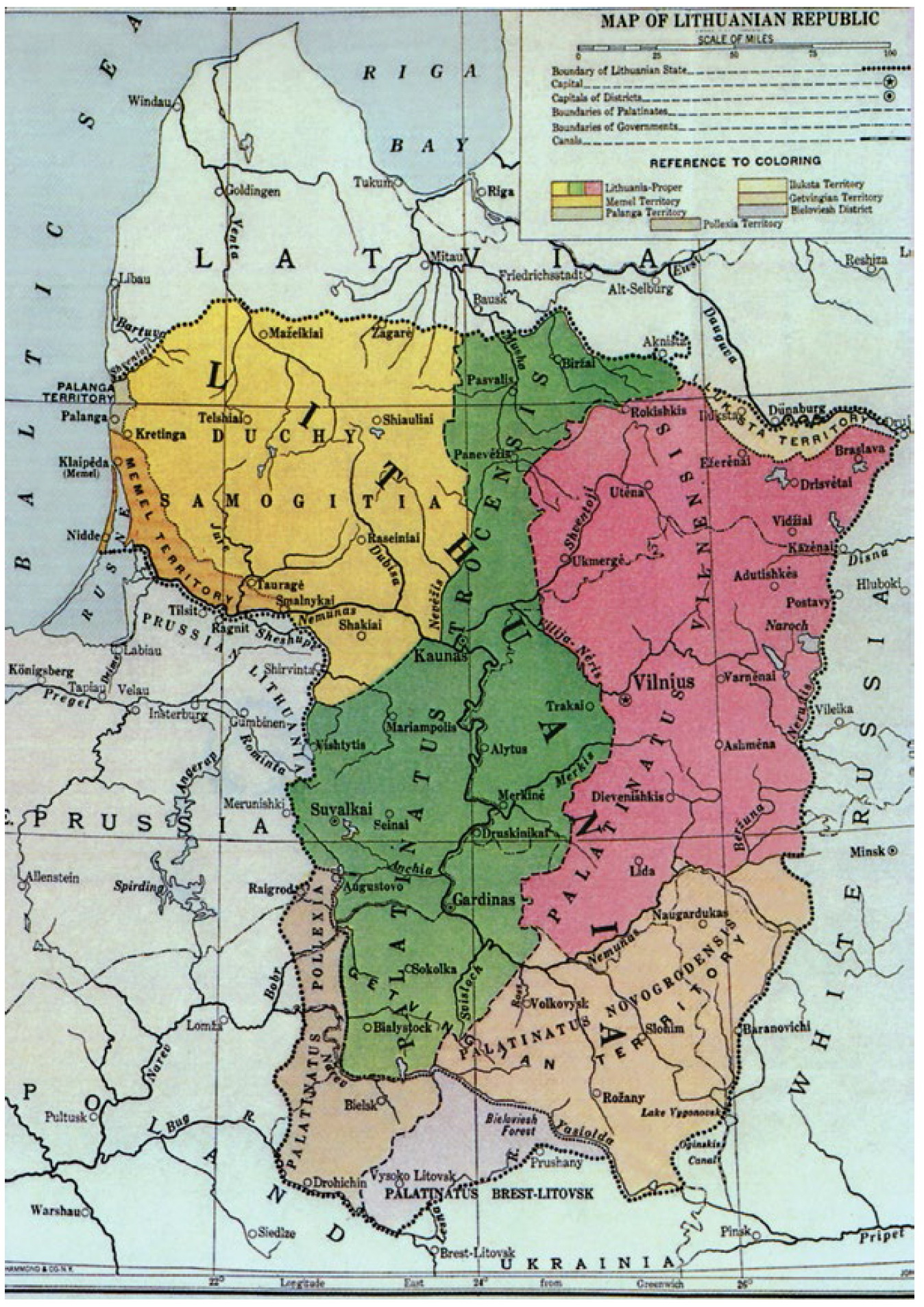
Lithuanian territorial claims on the Vilnius region presented at the Paris Peace Conference (1919–1920).

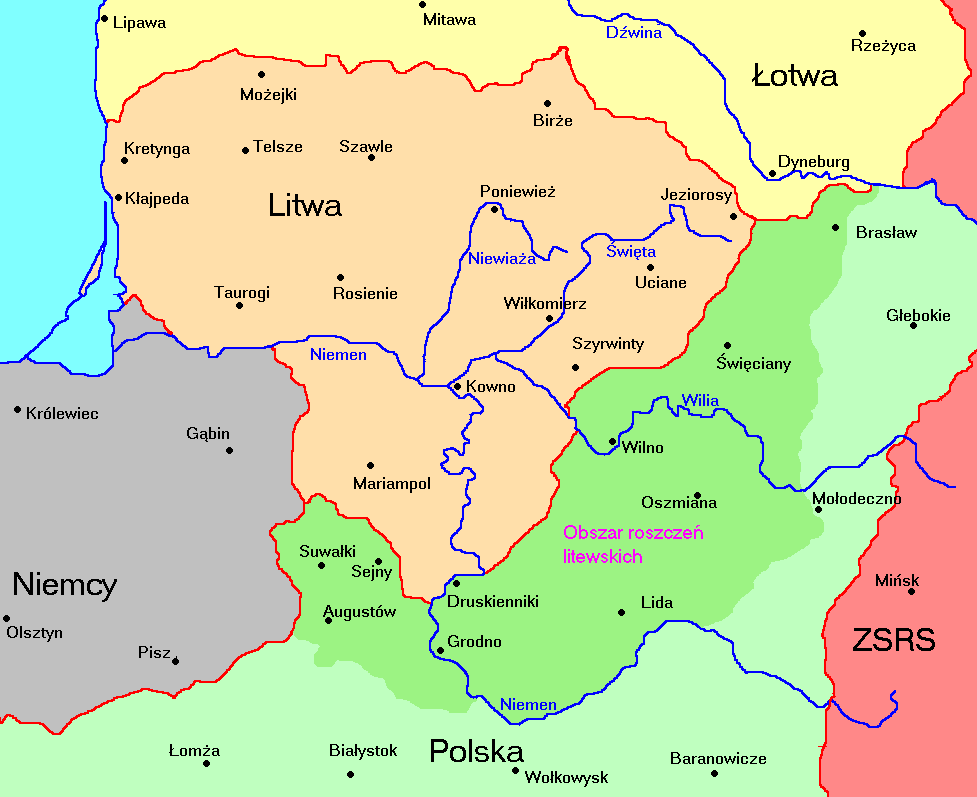
Lithuanian territorial claims (dark green) on the Vilnius region in 1920.

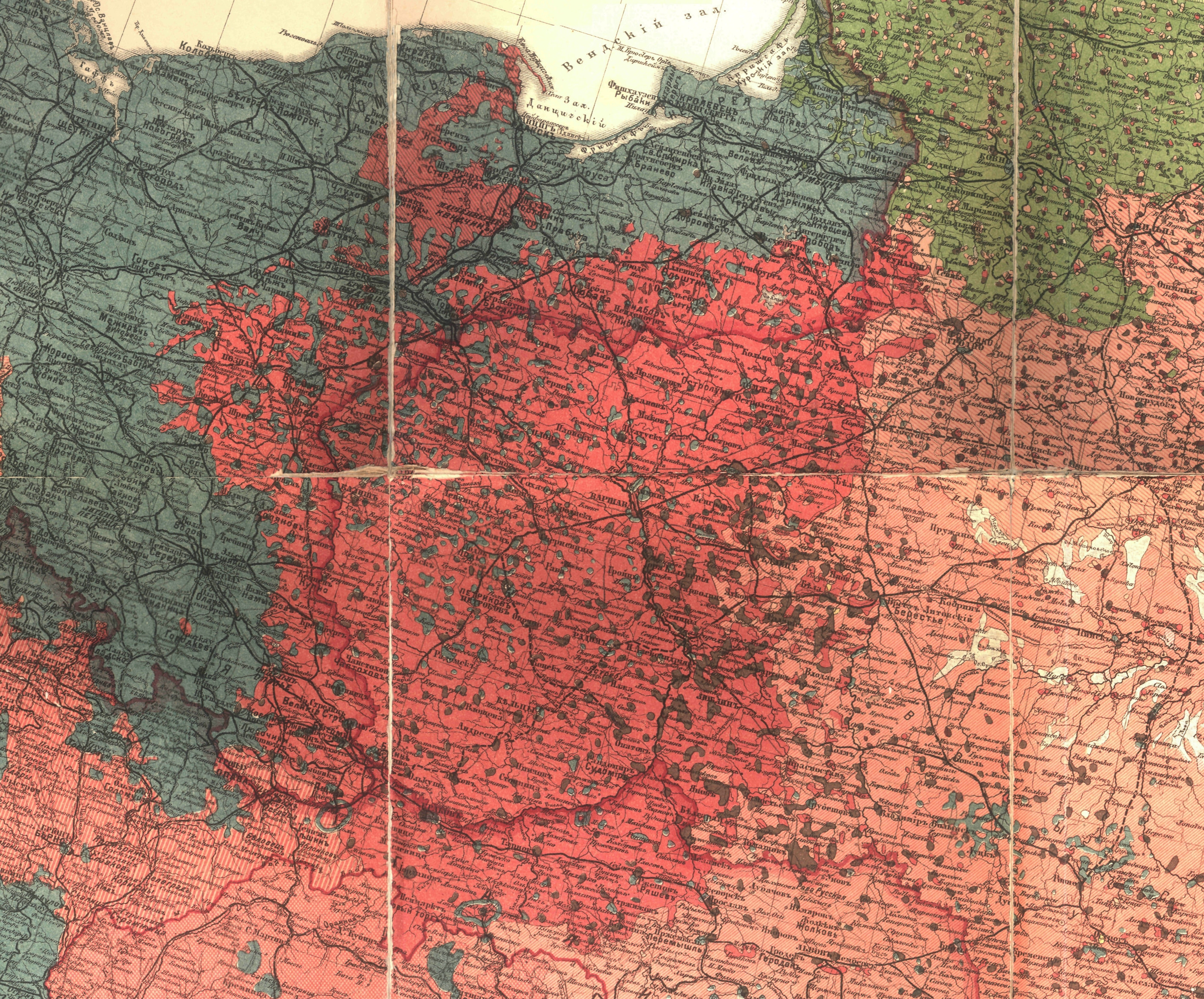
Poles (red, center) on Alexander Rittich's 1875 map.

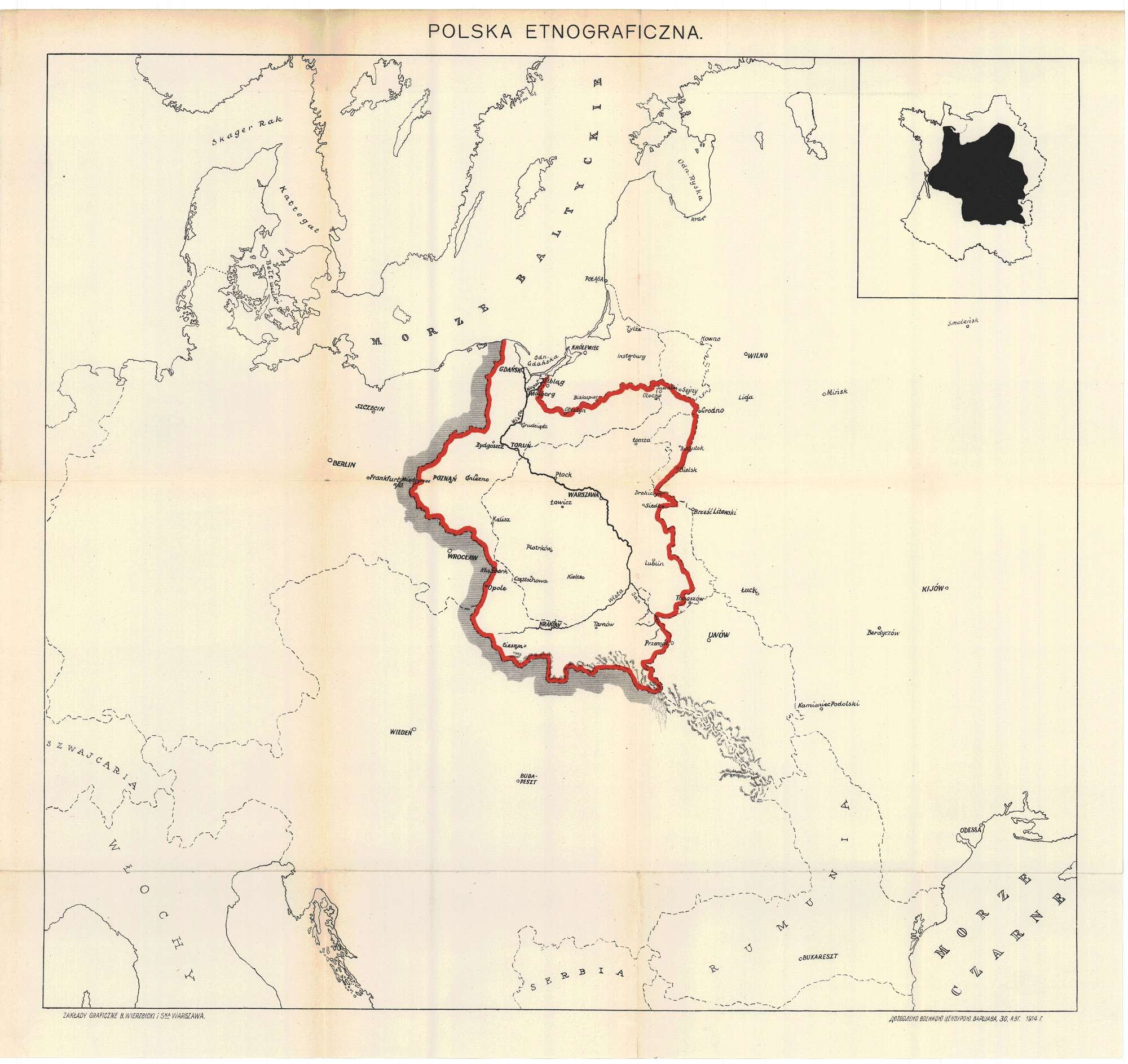
Ethnographic map of Poles by Czesław Jankowski (1914).

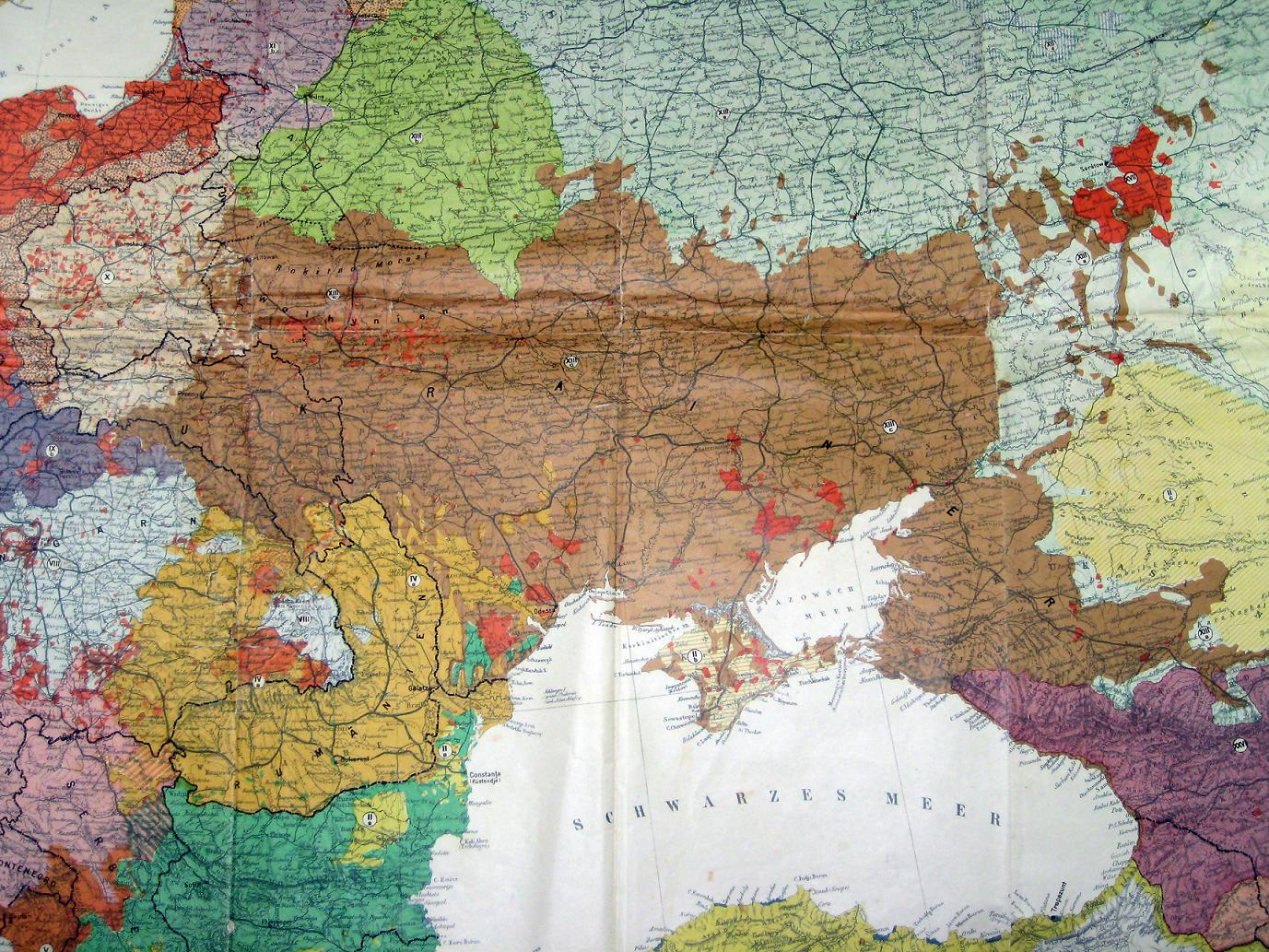
Fragment of "Lands and Peoples of Europe" (1918) by Dietrich Schäfer. Belarusians are shown in green on the top left.

== Bibliography ==
- Бандарчык, В. К.; et al., eds. (2001). Беларусы: у 10 т. Т. 4 : Вытокі і этнічнае развіццё [Belarusians: in 10 vols. Vol. 4: Origins and Ethnic Development] (in Belarusian). Мінск: Беларуская навука. p. 433.
- Белы, А. (2006). Белая Русь [White Rus]. Вялікае княства Літоўскае : энцыкл. : у 2 т. (in Belarusian). Vol. 1. Мінск. pp. 306–308.
- Бохан, Ю.; et al., eds. (2008). Гісторыя Беларусі: у 6 т. Т. 2. Беларусь у перыяд Вялікага Княства Літоўскага [History of Belarus: in 6 vols. Vol. 2. Belarus in the period of the Grand Duchy of Lithuania] (in Belarusian). Мінск: Экаперспектыва. p. 688.
- Гамулка, К. (2008). Паміж Польшчай і Расіяй. Беларусь у канцэпцыях польскіх палітычных фарміраванняў (1918—1922) [Between Poland and Russia. Belarus in the Concepts of Polish Political Formations (1918-1922)] (in Belarusian). Вільня. p. 256.
- Гринблат, М. Я. (1968). Белорусы. Очерки происхождения и этнической истории [Belarusians. Essays on Origins and Ethnic History] (in Russian). Минск: Наука и техника. p. 288.
- Долбилов, М. Д. (2010). Русский край, чужая вера: Этноконфессиональная политика империи в Литве и Белоруссии при Александре II [Russian Krai, Foreign Faith: Ethnoconfessional Policy of the Empire in Lithuania and Belorussia under Alexander II] (in Russian). Москва: Новое литературное обозрение. p. 1000.
- Каваленя, А. А.; et al., eds. (2011). Гісторыя беларускай дзяржаўнасці ў канцы XVIII ст. — пачатку XXI ст.: у 2-х кн. Кн. 1 [History of Belarusian Statehood in the Late 18th - Early 21st Centuries: in 2 books. Book 1] (in Belarusian). Мінск: Беларуская навука. p. 584.
- Карский, Е. Ф. (1917). Этнографическая карта белорусского племени [Ethnographic Map of the Belarusian Tribe] (in Russian). Прага.
- Марзалюк, І. А. (2009). Міфы «адраджэнскай» гістарыяграфіі Беларусі [Myths of the "Revivalist" Historiography of Belarus] (in Belarusian). Магілёў: МДУ імя А. А. Куляшова. p. 148.
- Насытка, Я. (1994). «Тыя ж беларусы…»: Этнічныя межы беларусаў у XIX — пачатку XX ст. ["The Same Belarusians...": Ethnic Borders of Belarusians in the 19th - early 20th c.]. Беларуская Мінуўшчына (in Belarusian) (4): 11–15.
- Раюк, А. Р. (2022). Мяжа паміж беларускай і рускай этнічнымі тэрыторыямі ў канцы XVIII — пачатку XX ст. [The border between Belarusian and Russian ethnic territories in the late 18th - early 20th centuries]. Пытанні Мастацтвазнаўства, Этналогіі І Фалькларыстыкі (in Belarusian) (32): 411–418.
- Сагановіч, Г. (2001). Нарыс гісторыі Беларусі ад старажытнасці да канца XVIII стагоддзя [Outline of the history of Belarus from antiquity to the end of the 18th century] (in Belarusian). Мінск: Энцыклапедыкс. p. 412.
- Смалянчук, А. (2008). Дыскусія пра вытокі на фоне «ідэалягічнай рэвалюцыі» [Discussion about the origins against the background of the "ideological revolution"]. ARCHE (in Belarusian) (3): 53–57.
- Чаквин, И. В.; Терешкович, П. В. (1990). Из истории становления национального самосознания белорусов (XIV — начало XX вв.) [From the history of the formation of the national self-consciousness of Belarusians (14th - early 20th centuries)]. Советская Этнография (in Russian) (6): 42–54.
- Ширяев, Е. Е. (1991). Беларусь: Русь Белая, Русь Черная и Литва в картах [Belarus: White Rus, Black Rus, and Lithuania in Maps] (in Russian). Минск: Наука и техника. p. 119.
- Woyniłłowicz, E. (1931). Wspomnienia. 1847—1928 [Memoirs. 1847-1928] (in Polish). Vol. 1. Wilno: Józef Zawadzki. p. 368.
