= Lucina =

Lucina may refer to:

- 146 Lucina, a main belt asteroid
- Lucina (mythology), the goddess of childbirth in Roman mythology
- Saint Lucina, 1st-century Christian
  - Crypt of Lucina, part of the catacombs of Rome
- Lucina C. Broadwell (1889-1919), U.S. murder victim
- Lucina, several genus names in zoology:
  - Lucina (bivalve), a clam genus in family Lucinidae, established by Bruguière in 1797
  - Lucina, a brush-footed butterfly genus invalidly established by Rafinesque in 1815; nowadays Melitaea
  - Lucina, a marsh fly genus invalidly established by Meigen in 1830, nowadays Salticella
  - Lucina, a cricket genus invalidly established by Walker in 1869, nowadays Phalangopsis
- Hamearis lucina, a butterfly
- Lucina (Fire Emblem), a character from the video game Fire Emblem Awakening also featured in the Super Smash Bros. series
- Lucina (typeface), a foundry type made by Ludwig & Mayer.

== See also ==
- Lučina (disambiguation)
- Lúčina
- Lucina River (disambiguation)
- Lucena (disambiguation)
