= Vilienskaja praŭda =

1939 Belarusian-language newspaper in Vilnia (now Vilnius)

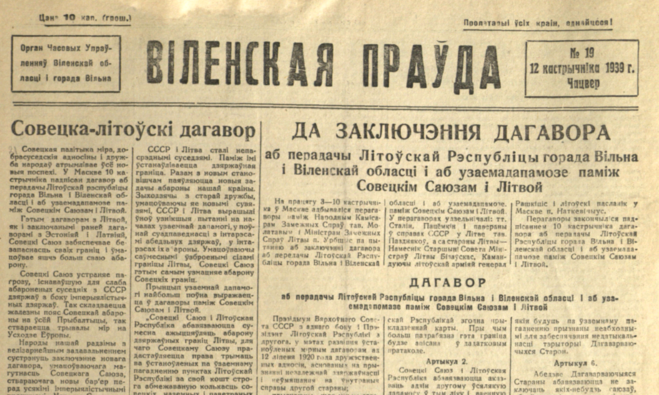
- Issue of Vilienskaja praŭda dated 12 October 1939
- Native name: Віленская праўда
- Type: Daily newspaper
- Owner: Soviet Union (Provisional Administration of the Vilnius District)
- Editor: Izrail Afengeym
- Founded: September 22, 1939
- Ceased publication: October 25, 1939
- Language: Belarusian
- Headquarters: Vilnia, Biskupska Street 3

Vilienskaja praŭda (Belarusian: Віленская праўда, 'Vilnia Truth') was a daily newspaper and the organ of the Provisional Administration of the Vilnia District, established after the reunification of Western Belarus with the BSSR.

It was planned as the regional newspaper of Vilnia (Belarusian: Вільня; now Vilnius) and the Vilnia Voblast (Belarusian: Віленская вобласць) (Note: The first Soviet regions in the annexed territories of Poland were created in December 1939, although their printed organs had been operating since the end of September.) of the BSSR. Published in the Belarusian language, the first issue was released on 22 September 1939. In the first issues of Vilienskaja praŭda, like in all Belarusian Soviet press of that time, propaganda texts were published about the historical rights of the Belarusian people to Vilnia and the Vilnia Region. The responsible editor was Izrail Afengeym. The editorial staff included Maksim Tank, Vincuk Žuk-Hryškievič (stylistic editor), Makar Kraŭcoŭ (M. M. Kascievič), Liuboŭ Asajevič(?), and Janka Bahdanovič. The editorial office collaborated with Anton Luckievich, Francišak Hryškievič, Siarhiej Busieł, and others. The office was located in a building on Biskupska Street (or Talat-Kelpšos, 3). (Note: From 1940 (after the creation of the Lithuanian SSR) until June 1941 (German occupation), the editorial offices of two Belarusian newspapers, Svabodnaja Belarus and Za svabodnaje žyccio, were located in the same building. The Central Telegraph is now located in this building.)

The newspaper regularly published reports from the German military command in its international news section without comment. In issue No. 15 of 8 October, a long speech by Adolf Hitler in the Reichstag was also published without comment. However, the main topic of this issue was reports on a city-wide rally, which effectively implied that the Vilnia Region was to be annexed to the BSSR.

However, in connection with the conclusion on 14 October 1939 of the "Treaty on the Transfer of the City of Vilnius and the Vilnius Region to the Republic of Lithuania and on Mutual Assistance between the Soviet Union and Lithuania", the planned regional center in Vilnia was moved to Viliejka. The last issue of Vilienskaja praŭda was published on 25 October 1939. The editorial equipment was transported from Vilnia to Viliejka, and the newspaper was renamed Viliejskaja praŭda (Belarusian: Вілейская праўда; 'Viliejka Truth') (Note: The names Vilienskaja praŭda and Viliejskaja praŭda differ by one letter.), becoming the organ of the Provisional Administration of the Viliejka Region (although the Viliejka Voblast was created only on 4 December 1939). The first issue of the new paper came out on 15 November 1939, continuing the numbering from Vilienskaja praŭda. In early 1940, Viliejskaja praŭda was renamed Sialianskaja gazieta ('Peasant Newspaper').

Issues 1–4, 7–15, 19, and 23 of Vilienskaja praŭda are preserved in the Old Periodicals Department of the Wroblewski Library of the Lithuanian Academy of Sciences in Vilnius.
