= Lučina =

Lučina may refer to:

- Lučina (river), a river in the Czech Republic
- Lučina (Frýdek-Místek District), a municipality and village in the Czech Republic
- Lučina (Ćićevac), a village in Serbia
- Lučina, Jajce, a village in Bosnia and Herzegovina
- Lučina, a village in the municipality of Slivno, Dubrovnik-Neretva County, Croatia
