= Belarusians (book) =

Fundamental ethnographic work by Yefim Karsky

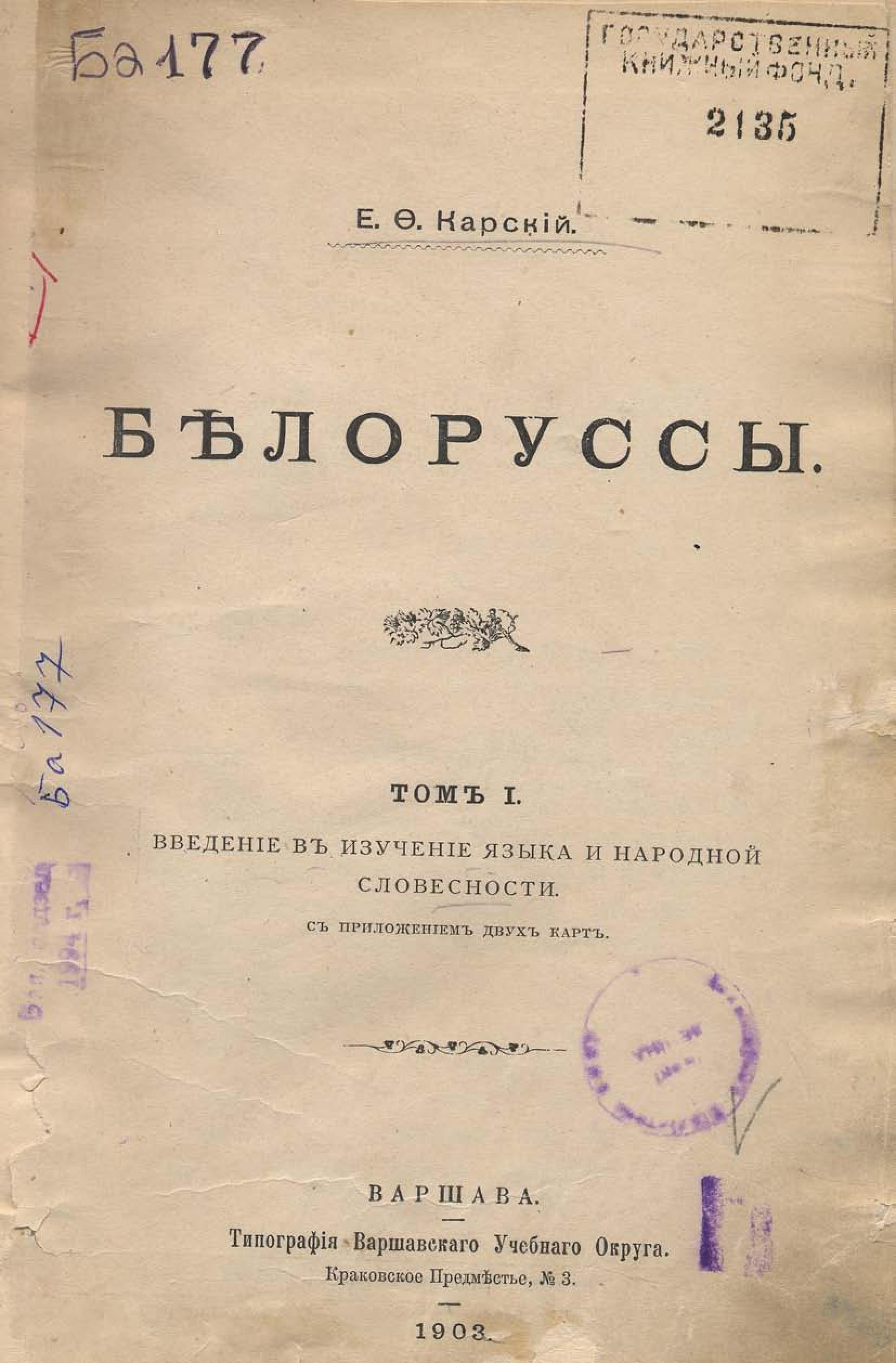
- Title page of the first volume (1903)
- Author: Yefim Karsky
- Original title: Russian: Бѣлоруссы
- Country: Russian Empire
- Language: Russian
- Genre: Linguistics, ethnography, literary history
- Publisher: Various (Warsaw, Moscow, Petrograd)
- Published: 1903–1922
- Media type: Print
- No. of books: 3 (in 7 issues)

Belarusians (Russian: Бѣлоруссы, romanized: Belorussy [vols. 1–2], Russian: Бѣлорусы [vol. 3]) is a fundamental scholarly work by Academician Yefim Karsky of the St. Petersburg Academy of Sciences, dedicated to the Belarusian language, literature, and folklore from the 13th to the first quarter of the 20th century. In its scholarly depth, scope of factual material, and cultural-social significance, the study has no equal among philological works in any Slavic country at the time.

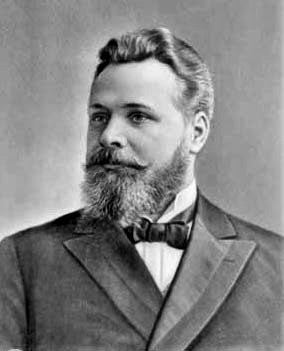
Yefim Karsky, the author of the series

The publication of Belarusians was preceded by many years of the author's work with historical sources (written monuments of business, artistic, publicistic, religious, legal, and chronicle content), folklore-ethnographic records of the 19th and early 20th centuries, and, most importantly, the study of the living Belarusian language in all the diversity of its territorial and social dialects. The work consists of three volumes, with the second and third volumes each containing three parts (issues). In total, seven books of Belarusians were published, with a total volume of 3,105 printed pages.

== Volume I. Introduction to the Study of the Language and Folk Literature ==
The first volume, titled Belarusians. Introduction to the Study of the Language and Folk Literature (Russian: Введеніе къ изученію языка и народной словесности), was published in Warsaw in 1903 and was reprinted by the journal Vilensky Vremennik in 1904. The author expressed his hope that the Belarusian people would finally gain access to true science with an epigraph from a poem by Yanka Luchyna, "To the Native Land" (1892):

Сонца навукі скрозь хмары цёмныя
Прагляне ясна над нашай ніваю,
І будуць жыці дзеткі патомныя
Добраю доляй, доляй шчасліваю!

The sun of science through dark clouds
Will shine clearly over our field,
And future children will live
A good fate, a happy fate!

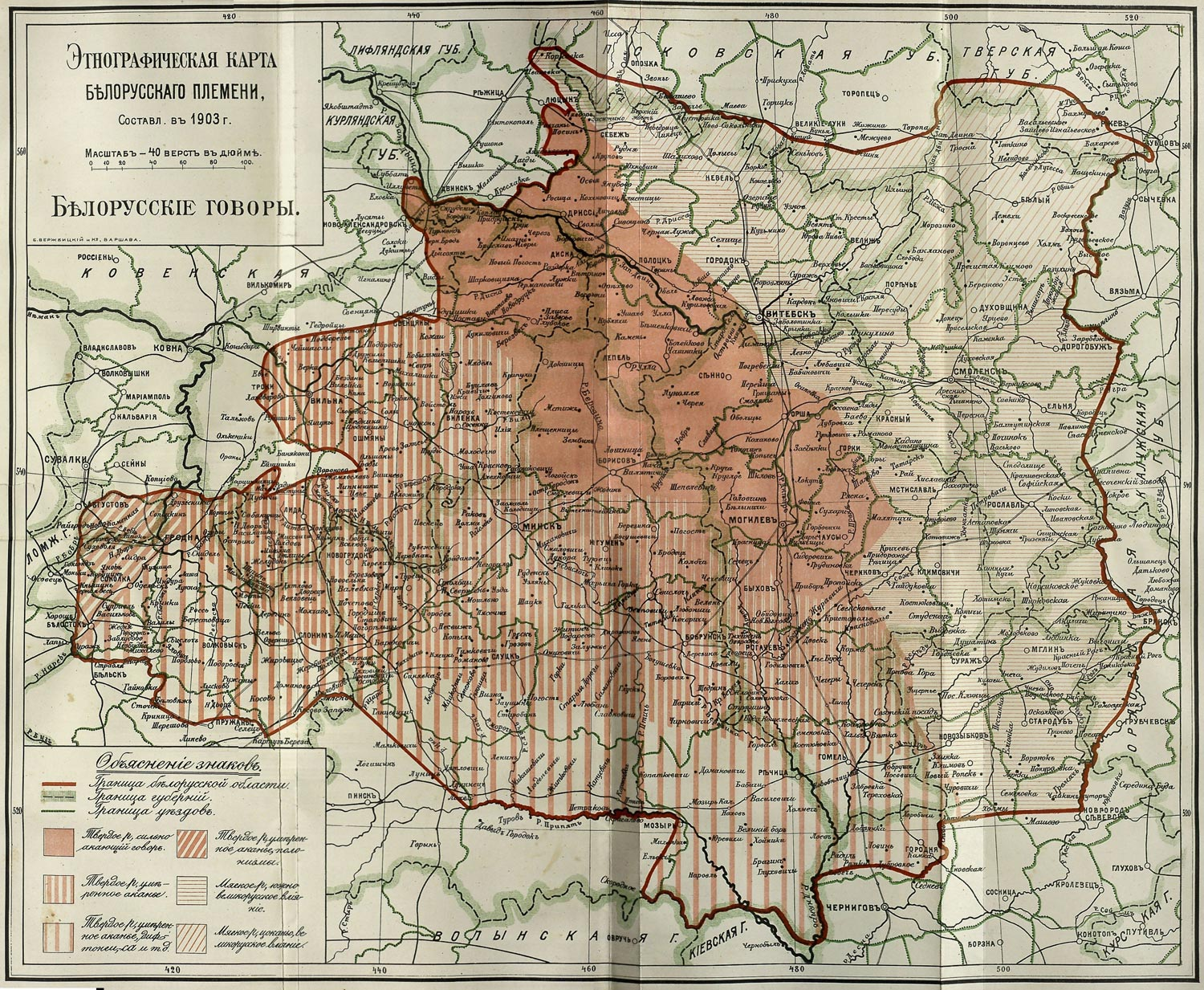
The "Map of the Belarusian language (Belarusian dialects)" in the first volume of Belarusians

The "Ethnographic map of the Belarusian tribe" in the first volume of Belarusians

In this volume, Karsky provided a broad historical picture of the origin of the Belarusian people, defining their geographical boundaries and describing their living conditions at the end of the 19th century. He identified the main linguistic features that distinguished Belarusians from other East Slavic groups since the 13th century (such as the non-explosive g, the non-syllabic u (ў), hardened sibilants, the affricate dz, and the development of akanye and yakanye). Karsky also examined the relationship of the Belarusian language with Ukrainian, Lithuanian, and Polish, and analyzed loanwords from other languages. The volume is illustrated with two groundbreaking maps: the "Ethnographic map of the Belarusian tribe" and the "Map of the Belarusian language", which remain scientifically significant to this day.

== Volume II. Language of the Belarusian People ==
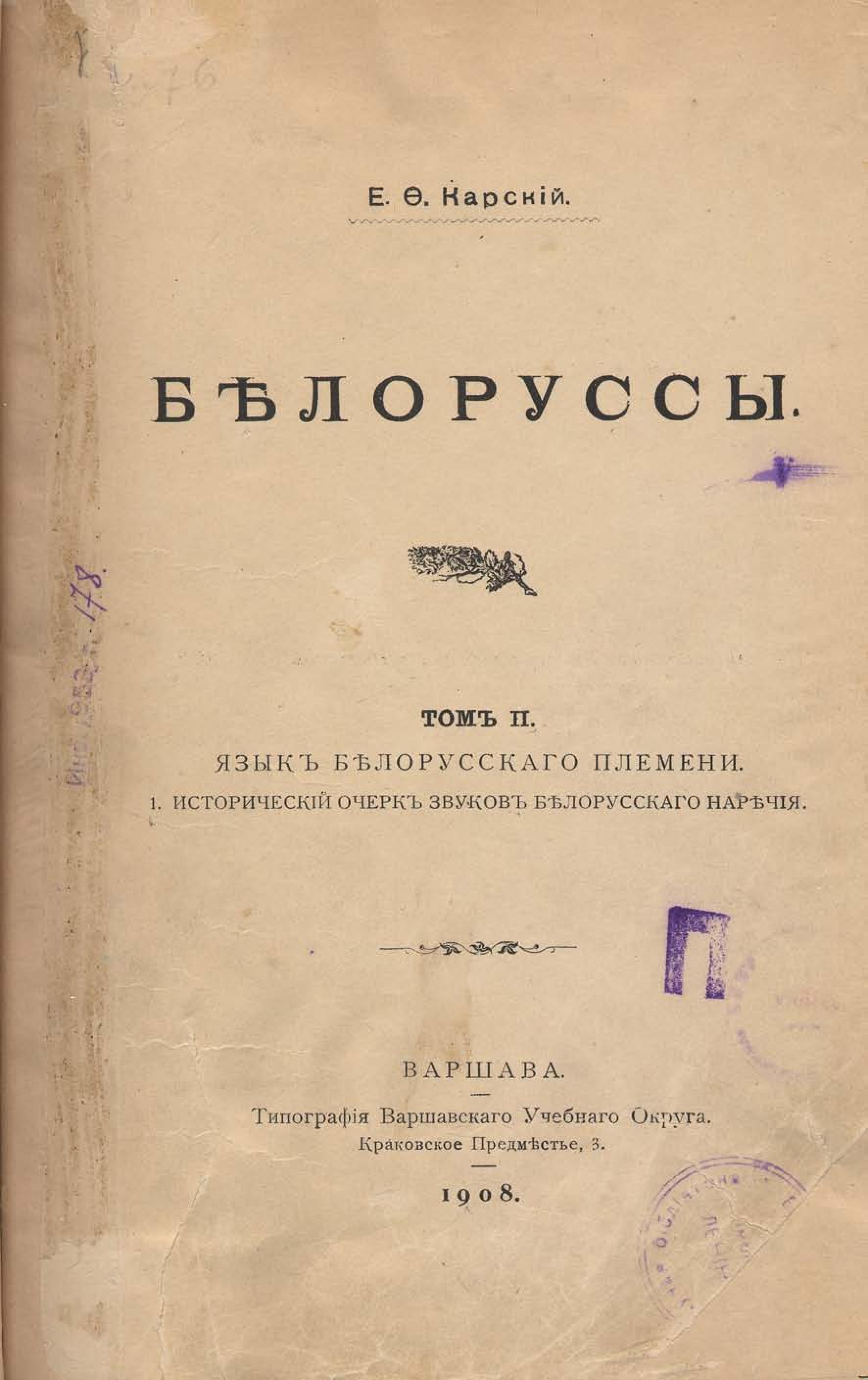
Title page of the second volume

The second volume was published in Warsaw between 1908 and 1912 under the title Belarusians. Language of the Belarusian Tribe (Russian: Языкъ белорусскаго племени). It consists of three parts:

1. Historical outline of the sounds of the Belarusian language;
2. Historical outline of word formation and inflection in the Belarusian language;
3. Outlines of Belarusian syntax.

This volume systematically examines the phonetic and morphological structure of the Belarusian language. Karsky analyzes sound phenomena from the Common Slavic and Old East Slavic periods, describes the accent system, and details the morphological features of Belarusian, noting both its commonalities with Russian and Ukrainian and its distinctive characteristics. The third part is dedicated to syntax, where Karsky analyzes types of simple and complex sentences and various syntactic constructions based on historical monuments and modern dialects.

== Volume III. Outlines of the Literature of the Belarusian People ==
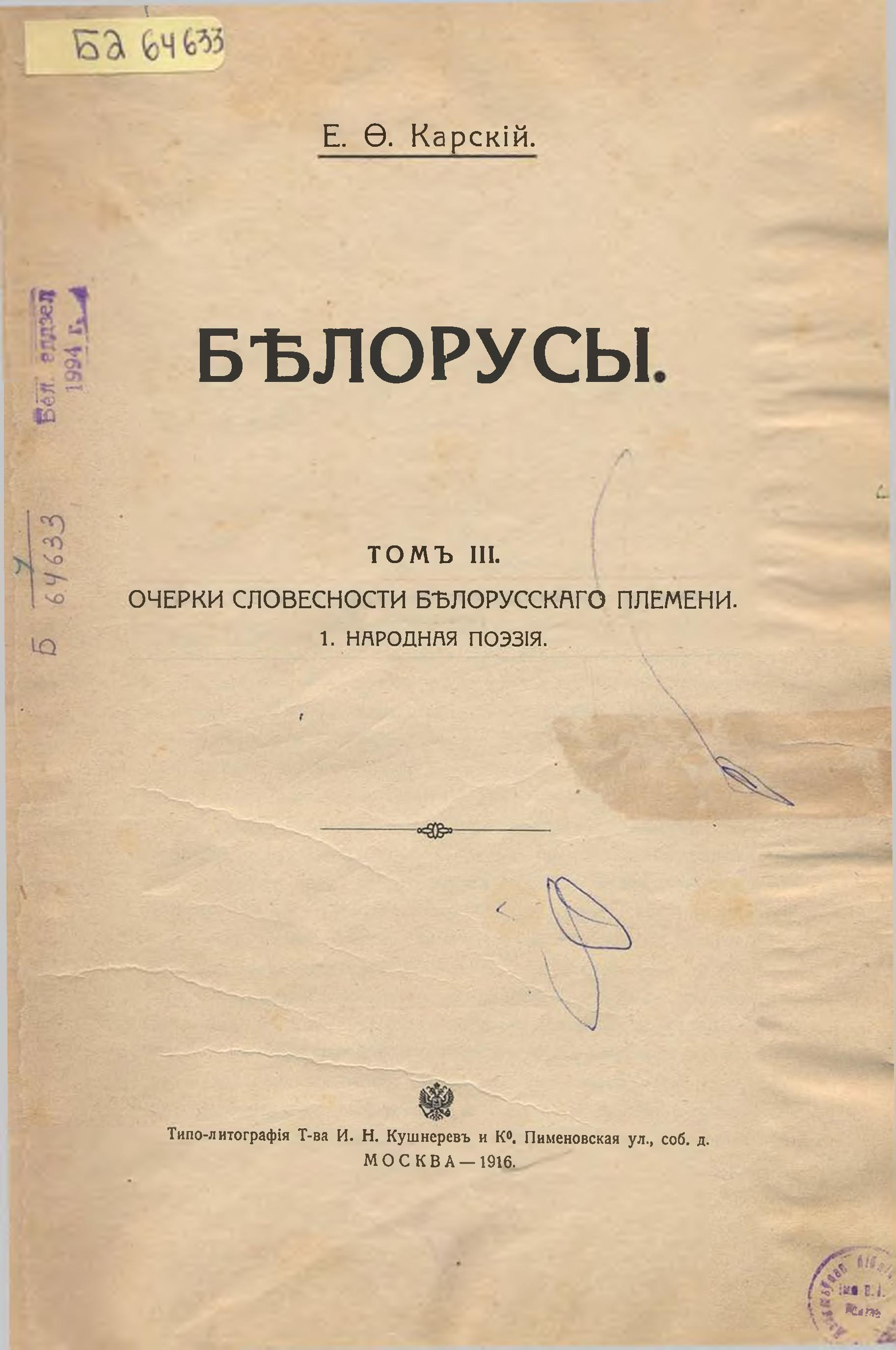
Title page of the "Folk Poetry" issue

The third volume, titled Outlines of the Literature of the Belarusian People (Russian: Очерки словесности белорусскаго племени), was published in three parts:

1. Folk Poetry (Moscow, 1916).
2. Old West Ruthenian Literature (Petrograd, 1921).
3. Belles-lettres in the Folk Language (Petrograd, 1922).

In this volume, Karsky analyzed the content, genres, and stylistic features of folklore and literary works. He paid special attention to the language of literary works of the 19th and early 20th centuries, emphasizing that "the value of a writer should be judged by how close their language is to the folk language." He provided critical observations on the language of Yanka Kupala, Yakub Kolas, Kanstancyja Bujło, and other Belarusian writers. Karsky also outlined plans for the creation of a complete dictionary of the modern Belarusian language and a dictionary of Old Belarusian written monuments, but these lexicographical projects remained unrealized.

== Significance ==
The three-volume work Belarusians holds an exceptional place in the history of both Belarusian and Slavic philology. The renowned Slavist Nikolay Derzhavin wrote:

The author worked on it [the study] for over 38 years... until the last days of his life and provided in it an enormous factual and bibliographic material on the study of the Belarusian language, folklore, and literature, which makes this work, in the literal sense of the word, an encyclopedia of Belarusian philology, unique in its volume and wealth of materials in world literature.

The Slavist Boris Lyapunov called it "incomparable in its comprehensiveness with any other study of Slavic peoples".

This work scientifically refuted the concept of linguistic identity between the Russian and Old Belarusian languages, confirmed the existence and distinctiveness of the Belarusian nation, and revealed the richness of its traditional culture to the world. According to researchers, the work "opened the eyes of Belarusians, allowing them to see themselves as a true nation".

== Bibliography ==
- Булахаў М. Г. (1994). "«Беларусы» Я. Ф. Карскага". Беларуская мова: энцыклапедыя [Belarusian Language: Encyclopedia] (in Belarusian). Мінск: Беларуская Энцыклапедыя. pp. 91–92.
- Борковский В. И. (1961). Заснавальнік беларускага мовазнаўства і беларускай філалогіі: (Да 100-годдзя з дня нараджэння акадэміка Я. Ф. Карскага) [The founder of Belarusian linguistics and Belarusian philology: (To the 100th anniversary of the birth of Academician Y. F. Karsky)]. Працы Ін-та мовазнаўства АН БССР (in Russian) (8). Мінск.
- Булахов, М. Г. (1981). Евфимий Федорович Карский: Жизнь, научн. и обществ. деятельность [Yefim Fyodorovich Karsky: Life, Scientific, and Social Activity] (in Russian). Мінск.
