= Lucina River =

Lucina River can refer to

- Lucina River (Moldova) tributary of the Moldova River in Romania
- Lučina (river) tributary of the Ostravice in the Czech Republic
