= Lúčina =

- Municipality
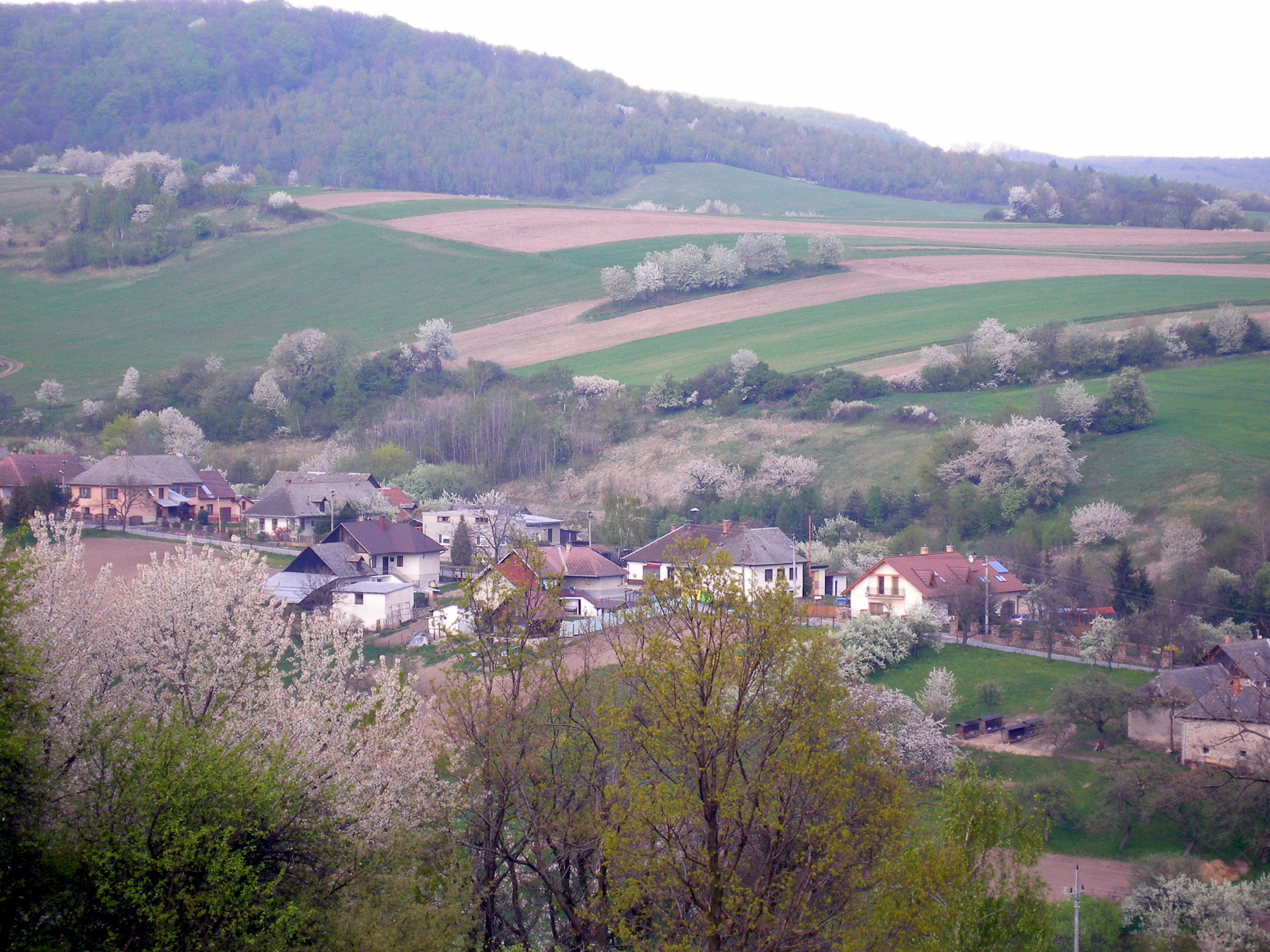

- Flag

- Location of Lúčina in the Prešov Region Location of Lúčina in Slovakia
- Coordinates: 48.90°N 21.43°E
- Country: Slovakia
- Region: Prešov Region
- District: Prešov District
- First mentioned: 1787

Area
  - Total: 1.86 km^{2} (0.72 sq mi)
- Elevation: 485 m (1,591 ft)

Population (2025)
  - Total: 154
- Time zone: UTC+1 (CET)
  - Summer (DST): UTC+2 (CEST)
- Postal code: 820 7
- Area code: +421 51
- Vehicle registration plate (until 2022): PO
- Website: www.lucina.sk

Lúčina is a village and municipality in Prešov District in the Prešov Region of eastern Slovakia.

== History ==
In historical records the village was first mentioned in 1787.

== Geography ==
The municipality lies at an altitude of 485 metres (1,591 ft) and covers an area of 1.86 km^{2} (0.72 sq mi) (2025).

== Population ==
Population statistic (10 years)
Year	1995	2005	2015	2025
Count	151	159	171	154
Difference		+5.29%	+7.54%	−9.94%

Population statistic
Year	2024	2025
Count	155	154
Difference		−0.64%

It has a population of 154 people (31 December 2025).

=== Ethnicity ===
Census 2021 (1+ %)
Ethnicity	Number	Fraction
Slovak	154	93.33%
Not found out	9	5.45%
Hungarian	3	1.81%
Total	165	

In year 2021 was 165 people by ethnicity 154 as Slovak, 9 as Not found out, 3 as Hungarian, 1 as Rusyn and 1 as Other.

Note on population: The difference values of population numbers in the table "Population statistic" and in the sections "Ethnicity" & "Religion" is caused by the use of various statistical methods.

=== Religion ===
Census 2021 (1+ %)
Religion	Number	Fraction
Roman Catholic Church	106	64.24%
Evangelical Church	26	15.76%
None	18	10.91%
Not found out	9	5.45%
Other and not ascertained christian church	3	1.82%
Seventh-day Adventist Church	2	1.21%
Total	165	

In year 2021 was 165 people by religion 106 from Roman Catholic Church, 26 from Evangelical Church, 18 from None, 9 from Not found out, 3 from Other and not ascertained christian church, 2 from Seventh-day Adventist Church and 1 from Christian Congregations in Slovakia.

== Cultural ==
Lúčina is also the name of the Lúčina Slovak Folklore Ensemble based in Cleveland, Ohio. They perform authentic Slovak dances from different regions of Slovakia.
