= Western Polesia =

Coordinates: 51.2626°N 23.3242°E

Western Polesia Zachodnie Polesie
- Natural and historical region
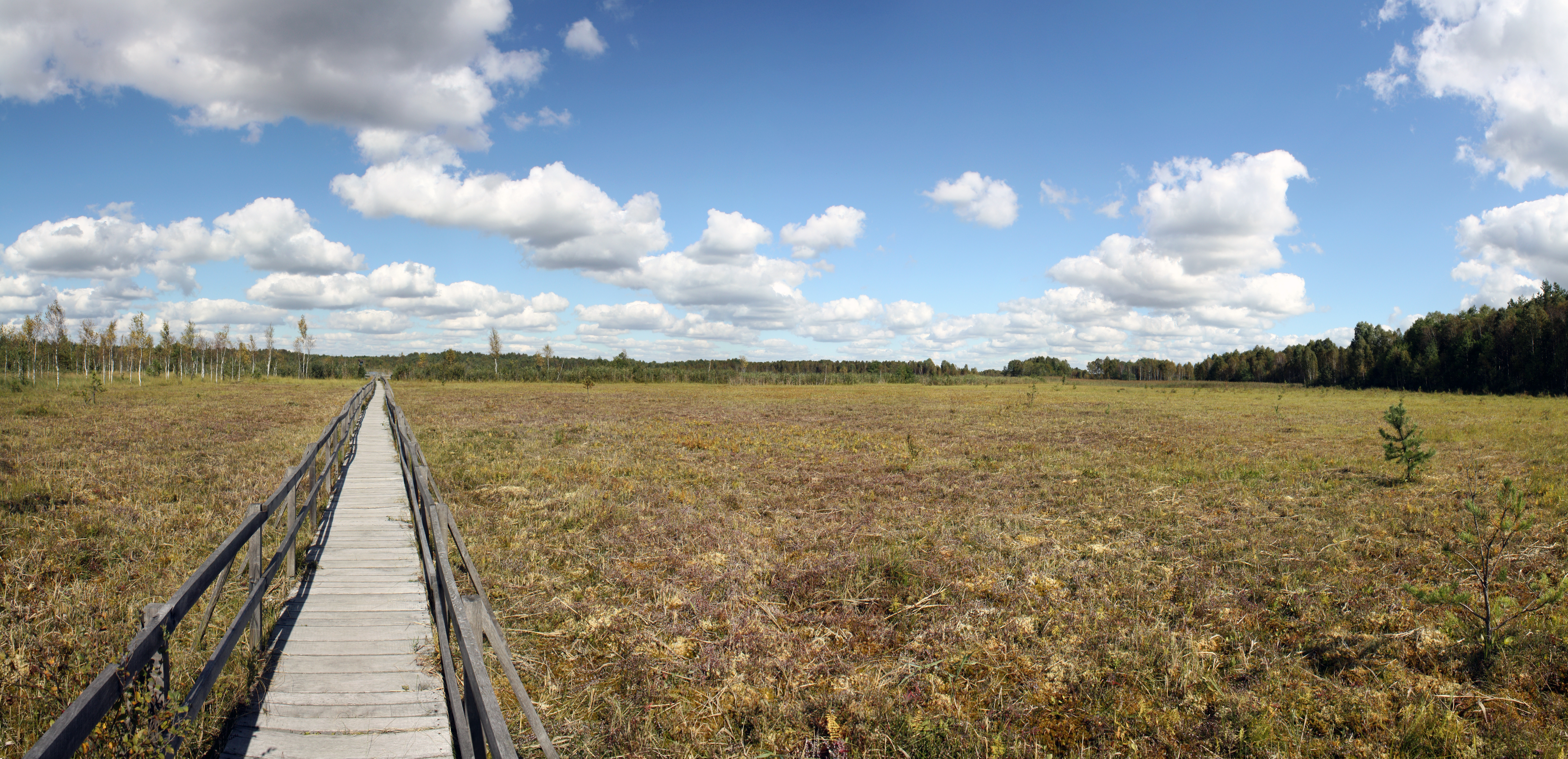
- Moszne Marshland (Eastern Poland)

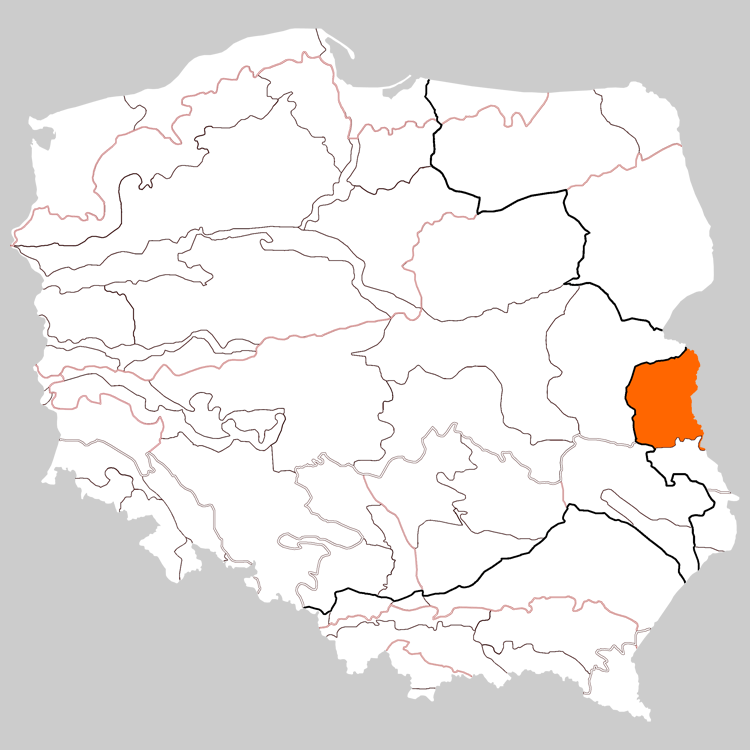
- Western Polesie marked in dark orange
- Countries: Poland

Western Polesia, also known as Podlachian Polesia and Lublin Polesia, is a geological macro-region to the west of the River Bug, which is the north-western part of Polesie (a land, mostly in Belarus and Ukraine). In geological terms, the lowland is part of the pre-Cambrian region. The north of the pre-Cambrian has carboniferous deposits, as well as deposits of cenozoic and chalk.

== Geography ==
Western Polesie accounts for much marshland and rich soils, as the land has not been used for cultivation. There is less arable land here than in other areas of the central-Polish lowland, as there are more meadows and pastures. There are also many forests. On drier areas, there are pine forests, whereas on boggy areas, among others there are alder patches of forests, and wetlands with the black alder trees.

In 1990, the region of Western Polesia was made into the Polesie National Park, where among others the European pond turtle habituates the land.

The main settlement of Western Polesie is Włodawa.
