= Lučina, Jajce =

Lučina
- Village
- Location within Bosnia and Herzegovina
- Coordinates: 44.3462546°N 17.2848465°E
- Country: Bosnia and Herzegovina
- Entity: Federation of Bosnia and Herzegovina
- Canton: Central Bosnia
- Municipality: Jajce

Area
  - Total: 0.14 sq mi (0.35 km^{2})

Population (2013)
  - Total: 137
  - Density: 1,000/sq mi (390/km^{2})
- Time zone: UTC+1 (CET)
  - Summer (DST): UTC+2 (CEST)

Lučina is a village in the municipality of Jajce, Bosnia and Herzegovina.

== Demographics ==
According to the 2013 census, its population was 137, all Croats.
