= Sergei Luchina =

Russian footballer

Personal information
- Full name: Sergei Aleksandrovich Luchina
- Date of birth: 12 January 1974 (age 52)
- Height: 1.76 m (5 ft 9 1/2 in)
- Position: Defender

Youth career
- FC Uralmash Sverdlovsk

Senior career*
Years	Team	Apps	(Gls)
1991	FC Gornyak Kachkanar (amateur)		
1992–1993	FC Gornyak Kachkanar	58	(0)
1994	FC Uralets Nizhny Tagil	26	(1)
1995–1996	FC Gornyak Kachkanar	35	(3)
1996	FC Uralmash Yekaterinburg	12	(0)
1997	FC Gazovik-Gazprom Izhevsk	9	(0)
1999–2002	FC Uralmash Yekaterinburg	95	(1)
- * Club domestic league appearances and goals

Sergei Aleksandrovich Luchina (Russian: Сергей Александрович Лучина; born 12 January 1974) is a former Russian football player.
