= Polesia =

Natural and historical region of Eastern Europe

Polesia Палессе • Полісся Polesie
- Natural and historical region
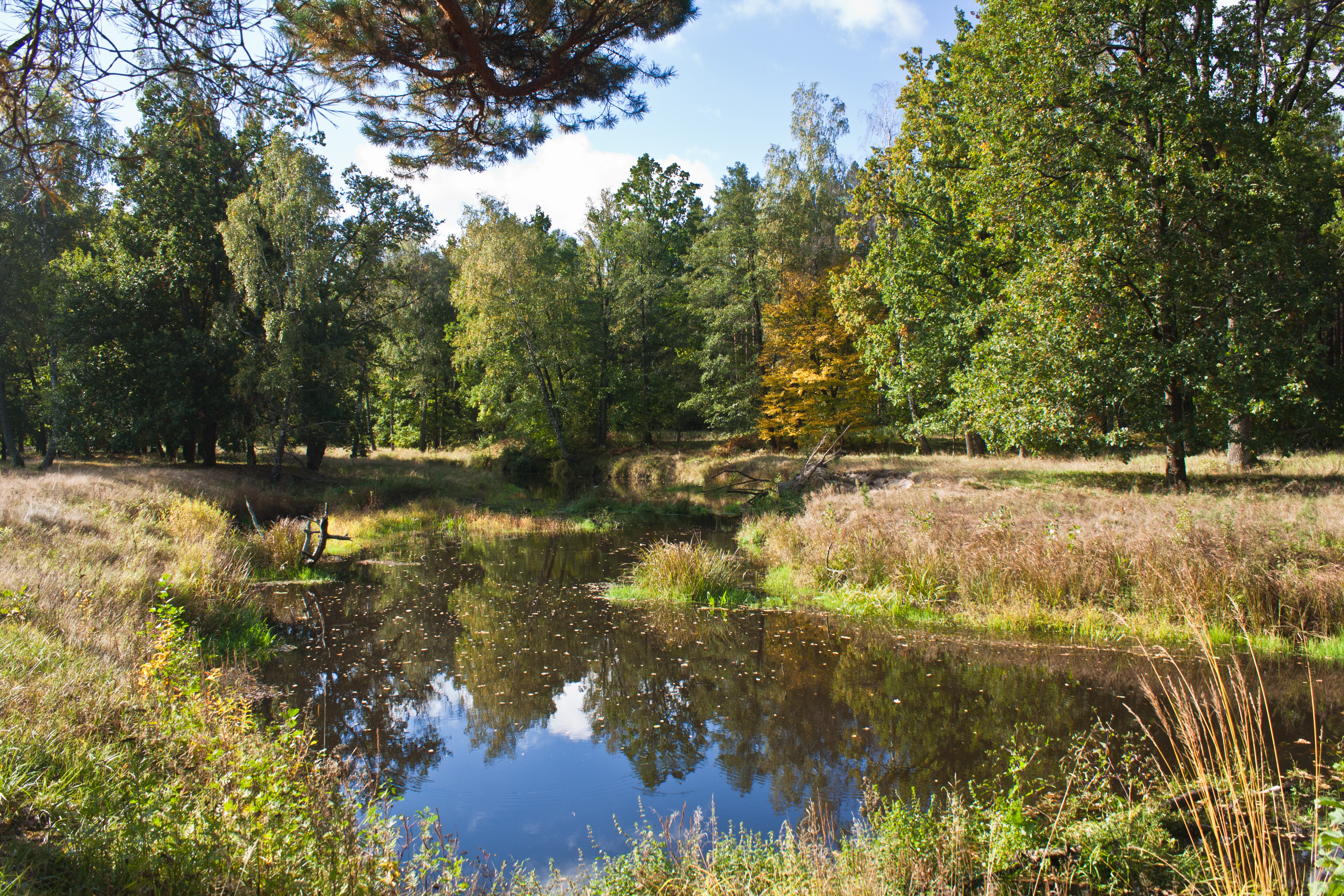
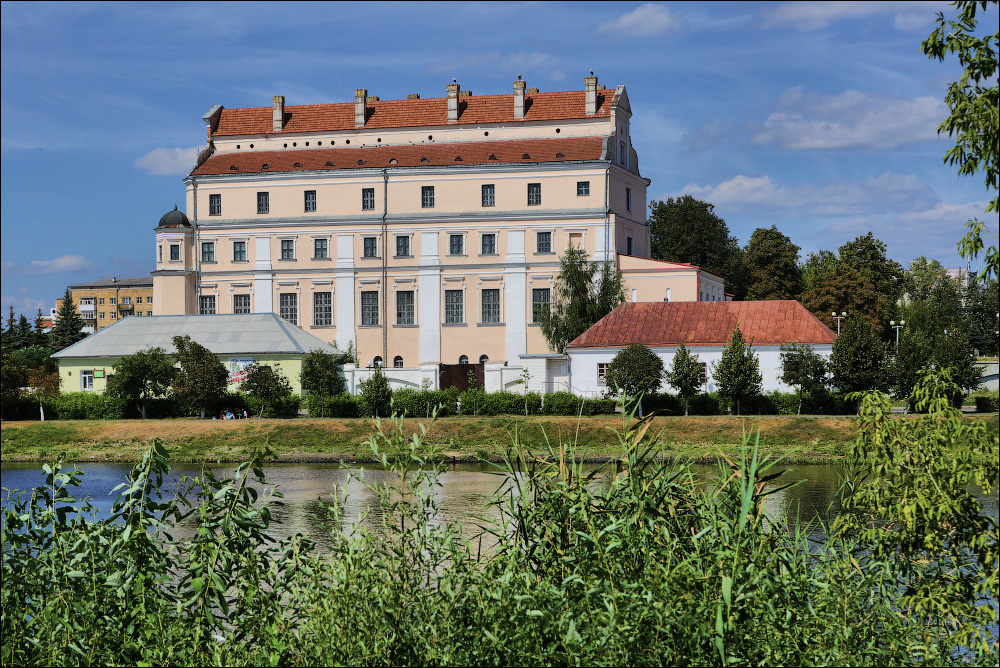
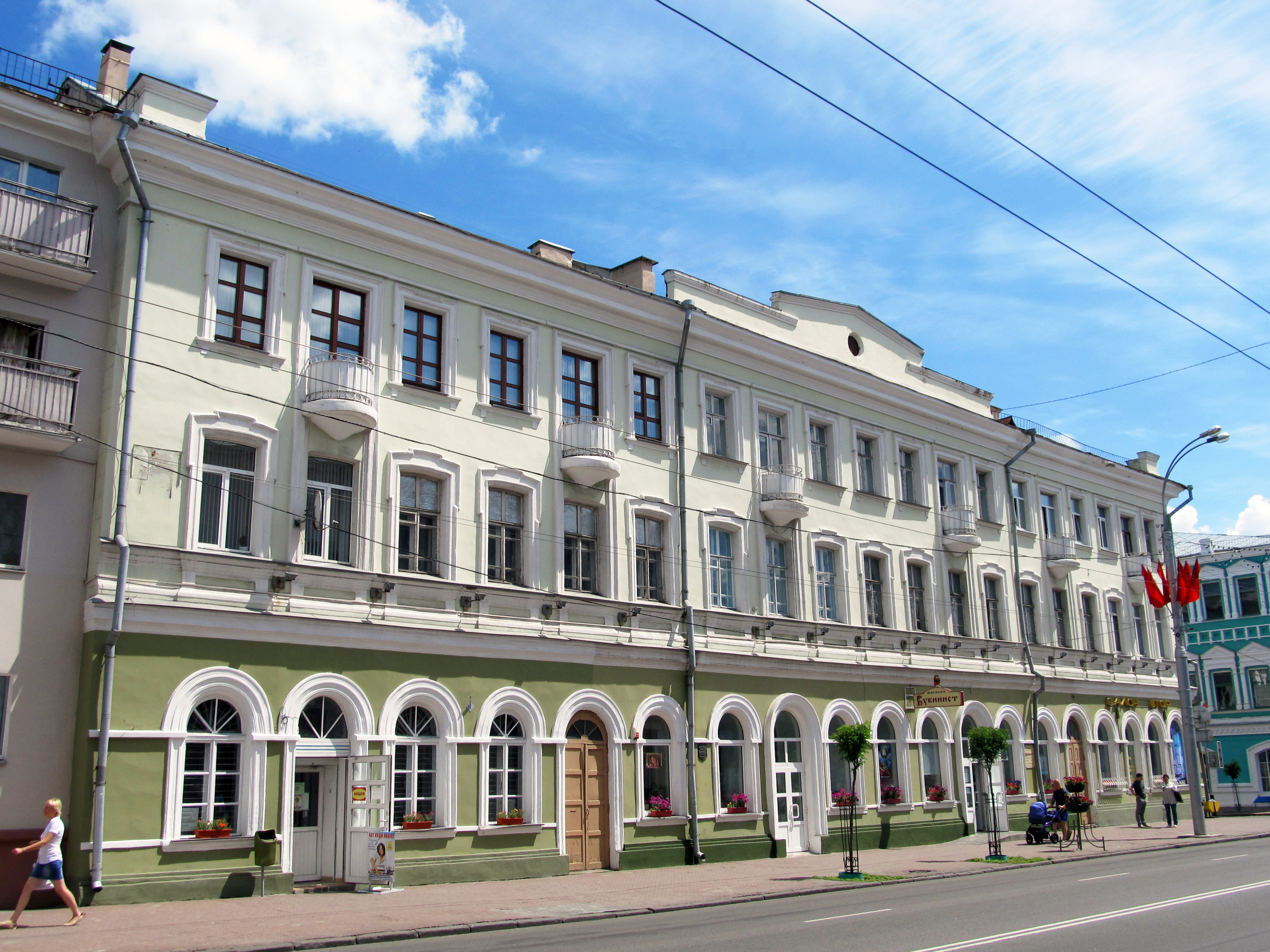
- Left to right: Ubort River near the city of Olevsk, Ukraine; Pinsk; Homel

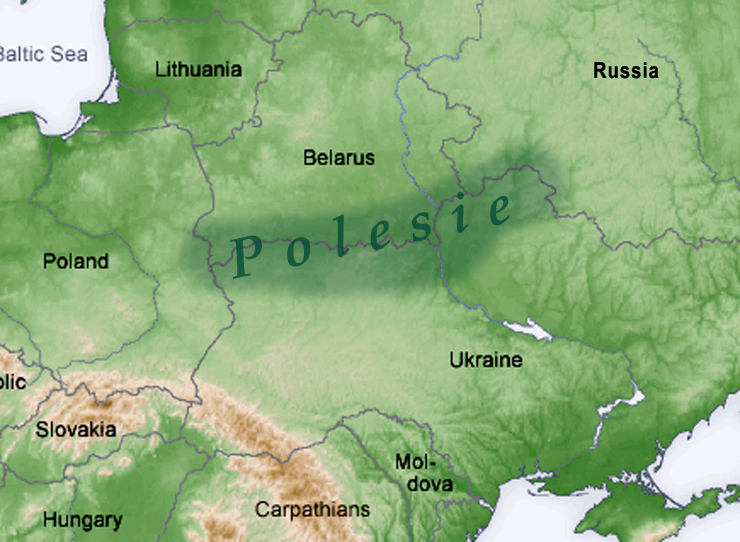
- Polesian Lowland marked in dark green
- Countries: Belarus, Poland, and Ukraine
- Largest city: Homel

Polesia, also called Palessie, Polissia or Polesie, (Note: Belarusian: Палессе, romanized: Palessie [paˈlʲɛsʲːɛ]; Ukrainian: Полісся, romanized: Polissia [poˈl⁽ʲ⁾isʲːɐ]; Polish: Polesie [pɔˈlɛɕɛ]; Russian: Полесье, romanized: Polesye; Latin: Tractus Polesiensis) is a natural (geographic) and historical region in Eastern Europe within the East European Plain, including the Belarus–Ukraine border region and part of eastern Poland. This region should not be confused with parts of Russia also traditionally called "Polesie".

== Extent ==
One of the largest forest areas on the continent, Polesia is located in the southwestern part of the Eastern-European Lowland, the Polesian Lowland. On the western side, Polesia includes the crossing of the Bug River valley in Poland and the Pripyat River valley of Western Ukraine. The westernmost part of the region, located in Poland and around Brest, Belarus, historically also formed part of the historic region of Podlachia, and is also referred to as such. The modern Polish part was not considered part of Polesia by the late 19th-century Geographical Dictionary of the Kingdom of Poland, which defined the region as roughly a triangle between the cities of Brest in the west, Mogilev in the northeast and Kyiv in the southeast.

The swampy areas of central Polesia are known as the Pinsk Marshes (after the major local city of Pinsk). Large parts of the region were contaminated after the Chernobyl disaster and the region now includes the Chernobyl Exclusion Zone and Polesie State Radioecological Reserve, named after the region. This includes Ukraine north-northwest of its capital Kyiv region.

Palessie within Belarus

Geographic regions of Polissia within Ukraine

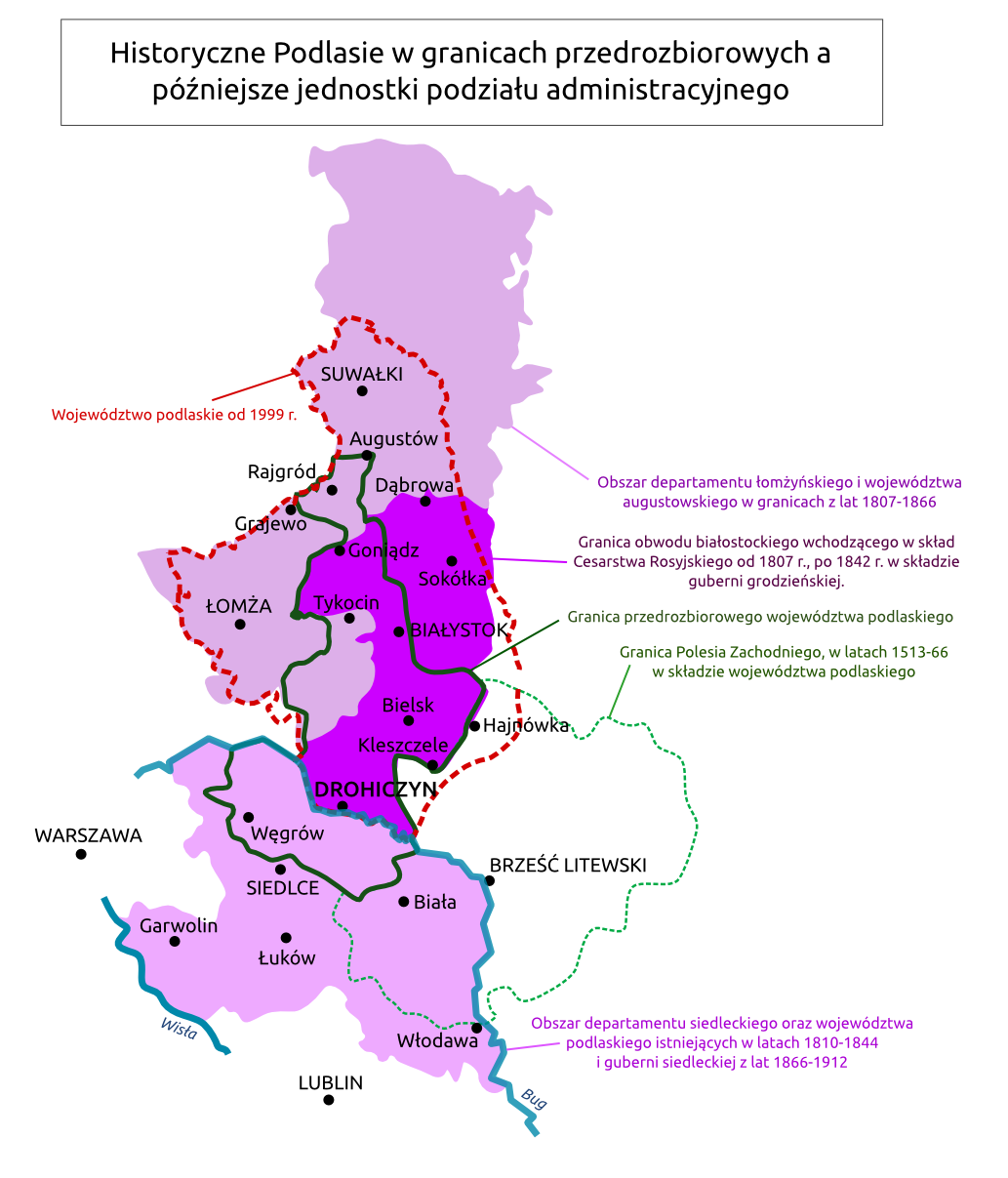
Polesia or Podlachia in eastern Poland

== Name ==
The names Polesia/Palessie/Polissia, etc. are constructed from the East Slavic root les 'forest', and the prefix po-, which in the meaning of 'on, by, along' is used to create place names. Inhabitants of Polesia are called Paleshuks.

== History ==
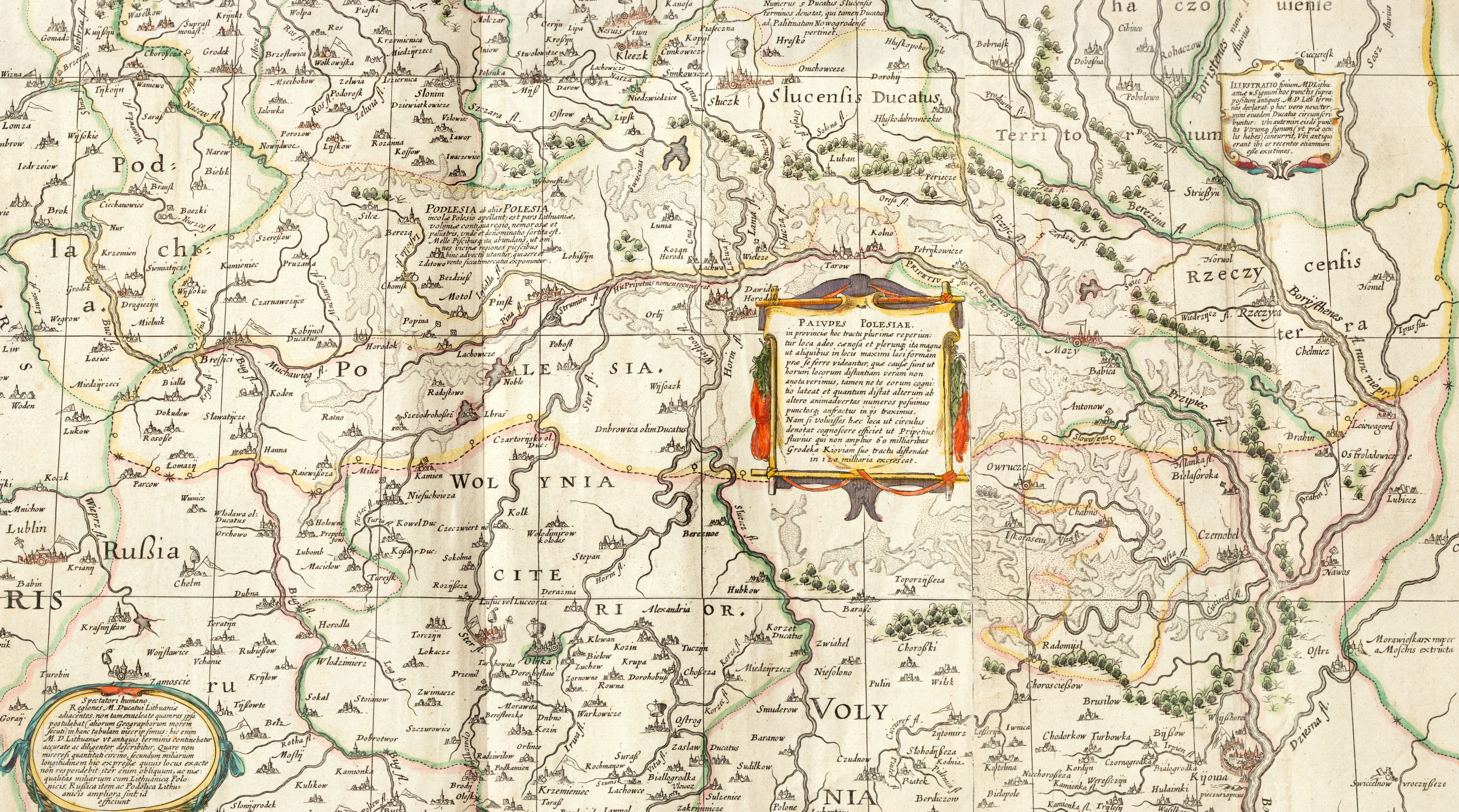
Polesia in 1613 (detail of Radziwiłł map)

In ancient times, the areas of today's western, west-central and south-central Polesia were inhabited by the people of the Milograd culture, the Neuri, an ancient people whose ethnic affinities are variously ascribed to have been Slavic, Baltic or Balto-Slavic and who would become the ancestors of modern Poleshuks (via substratum or direct descent is debated).. The Neuri are commonly connected to the Bavarian Geographer’s “Neriuani” who lived in the same region and were either Slavic, Baltic, or Uralic.

In the late Middle Ages Polesia became part of the Grand Duchy of Lithuania, following it into the Polish–Lithuanian Commonwealth (1569). It became part of Russia in the late-18th-century Partitions of Poland. Polesia was largely part of Poland from 1921 to 1939, when the country's largest province, the Polesie Voivodeship, bore that name, with the eastern part forming part of the Byelorussian SSR, within which the Polesia Region was created in 1938. From 1931 to 1944, it was explicitly mentioned as constituent part of the short-lived (Byzantine Rite) Ukrainian Catholic Apostolic Exarchate of Volhynia, Polesia and Pidliashia.

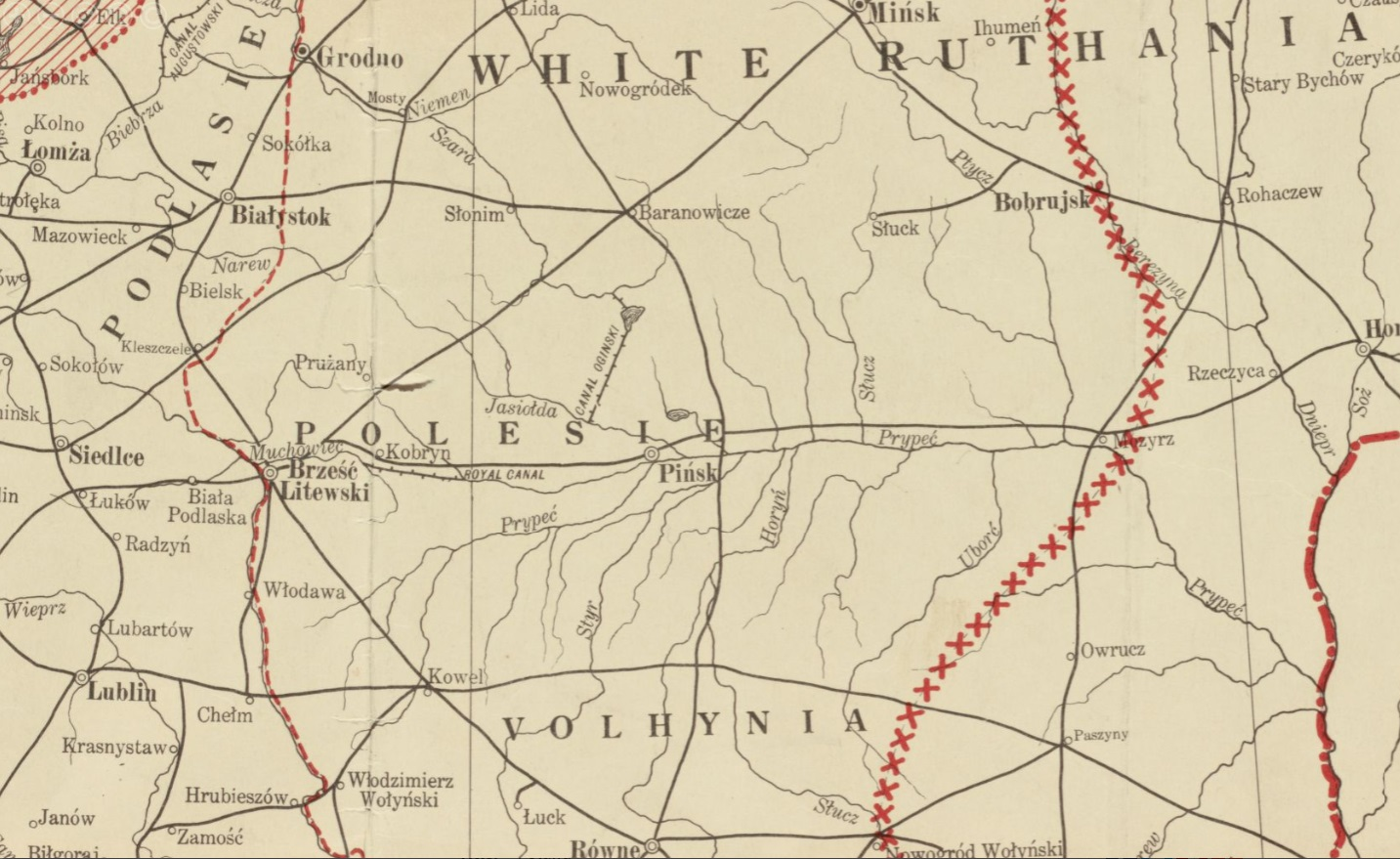
Polesia in May 1920

Following the 1939 invasion of Poland, most of the region was under Soviet occupation, with the western outskirts under German occupation until 1941, and then the entire region, including the pre-war Soviet-controlled part, was under German occupation until 1943–1944. Since the end of World War II, the region has encompassed areas in eastern Poland, southern Belarus, and northwestern Ukraine.

== Geography ==
Polesia is a marshy region lining the Pripyat River (Pripyat Marshes) in Southern Belarus (Brest, Pinsk, Kalinkavichy, Gomel), Northern Ukraine (in the Volyn, Rivne, Zhytomyr, Kyiv and Chernihiv Oblasts), and partly in Poland (Lublin). It is a flatland within the drainage basins of the Western Bug and Prypyat rivers. The two rivers are connected by the Dnieper-Bug Canal, built during the reign of Stanislaus II of Poland, the last king of the Polish–Lithuanian Commonwealth.

Notable tributaries of the Pripyat are the Horyn, Stokhid, Styr, Ptsich, and Yaselda rivers. The largest towns in the Pripyat basin are Pinsk, Stolin, Davyd-Haradok. Huge marshes were reclaimed from the 1960s to the 1980s for farmland.

The region is subdivided into several subregions among which are:

Poland

- Western Polesia

Ukraine

- Volhynian Polissia
- Little Polissia, a.ka. Lviv Polissia
- Zhytomyr Polissia
- Kyiv Polissia
- Chernihiv Polissia
- Novhorod-Siverskyi Polissia

Belarus

- Brest Paliessie
- Zaharodzie
- Prypiat Paliessie
- Mazyr Paliessie
- Homiel Paliessie

According to the late 19th-century Geographical Dictionary of the Kingdom of Poland Polesie was divided into Northern Polesia, itself divided into Upper Polesia or Pinsk Polesia and Lower Polesia or Mazyr Polesia, and Southern Polesia, itself divided into Volhynian Polesia (overlapping northern Volhynia) and Drevlian Polesia.

=== Chernobyl disaster ===
This region suffered severely from the Chernobyl disaster. Huge areas were polluted by radioactive elements. The most polluted part includes the Chernobyl Exclusion Zone and the adjacent Polesie State Radioecological Reserve. Some other areas in the region are considered unsuitable for living as well.

== Tourism ==
The Polish part of the region includes the Polesie National Park (Poleski Park Narodowy), established 1990, which covers an area of 97.6 square kilometres (37.7 sq mi). This and a wider area adjoining it (up to the Ukrainian border) make up the UNESCO-designated West Polesie Biosphere Reserve, which borders a similar reserve (the Shatsk Biosphere Reserve) on the Ukrainian side. There is also a protected area called Prybuzhskaie-Paliessie in the Belarusian part of the region.

The wooden architecture structures in the region were added to the UNESCO World Heritage Tentative List on 30 January 2004 in the Cultural category.

== See also ==
- Museum of Ukrainian home icons
- Radomysl Castle
- Swamps of Belarus
- Western Polesie
- Polesian Saddle, large tectonic structure in southwestern Belarus

There are areas in Russia traditionally called Polesie (Russian: Полесье) as well. However there the origin of the term is different: historically it referred to transitional areas from woodless fields to densely wooded territory.

- Oryol-Kaluga Polesie straddling the border of Oryol and Kaluga Oblasts
  - Orlovskoye Polesye National Park
- Bryansk-Zhizdra Polesie (Брянско-Жиздринское Полесье) is a forest area with about 1% swamps within the slightly elevated outwash plain in the south-west of Kaluga Oblast between rivers Resseta and Vytebet.
