= Janka Lučyna =

Belarusian poet

Janka Lučyna Янка Лучына
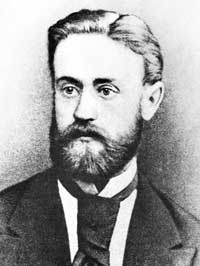

Jan Niesłuchowski (1851, Minsk – 1897, Minsk), better known by his pen name Janka Lučyna (Belarusian: Янка Лучына, Yanka Luchyna), was a poet from the Russian Empire who wrote in Belarusian, Polish, and Russian.

A son of a civil court clerk, Niesłuchowski graduated from Saint Petersburg Institute of Technology and worked as a railway engineer. Because of a leg disease he needed crutches to walk. A collection of his Belarusian poems and translations, Viazanka (A Bundle) was published in 1903, several years after his death, earning him a place among the founders of the modern Belarusian literature.
