= List of Belarusian writers =

Below is an alphabetical list of famous novelists, poets, and playwrights, who are Belarusian or of Belarusian origin.

== A ==
- Aleś Adamovič (1927–1994), writer and critic.
- Kastuś Akuła (1925–2008), writer and journalist.
- Śviatłana Aleksijevič (born 1948), investigative journalist and prose writer.
- Francišak Alachnovič (1883–1944), writer, journalist and Gulag survivor.
- Natalla Arsieńnieva (1903–1997), playwright, poet, and translator.

== B ==
- Alhierd Bacharevič (b. 1975), writer and translator.
- Maksim Bahdanovič (1891–1917), poet, journalist and literary critic.
- Francišak Bahuševič (1840–1900), poet, writer and lawyer.
- Ryhor Baradulin (1935–2014), poet, essayist and translator
- Źmitrok Biadula (Samuił Płaŭnik) (1886–1941), poet, writer and activist.
- Alexander Bogdanov (1873–1928), philosopher and revolutionary.
- Janka Bryl (1917–2006), short-story writer.
- Symon Budny (c. 1530 – 1593), humanist scholar and educator.
- Vasil Bykaŭ (1924–2003), novelist.

== C ==
- Ciotka (Ałaiza Paškievič) (1876–1916), poet and political activist.

== Č ==
- Jan Čačot (1796–1847), romantic poet and ethnologist.
- Kuźma Čorny (1900–1944), novelist.

== D ==
- Siarhiej Dubaviec (born 1959), journalist and writer.
- Uładzimier Duboŭka (1900–1976), poet and nationalist.
- Vincent Dunin-Marcinkievič (c. 1808 – 1884), writer, poet, dramatist and social activist.

== F ==
- Sasha Filipenko (b. 1984), writer and journalist.

== H ==
- Maksim Harecki (1893–1939), folklorist and scholar.
- Ciška Hartny (Źmicier Žyłunovič) (1887–1937), poet, writer and journalist.
- Alés Harun (1887–1920), poet, story writer and dramatist.
- Larysa Hienijuš (1910–1983), poet, writer and nationalist.
- Adam Hlobus (b. 1958), writer, poet, and artist.

== K ==
- Karuś Kahaniec (1868–1918), poet and writer
- Kastuś Kalinoŭski (1838–1864), writer, journalist, lawyer and revolutionary.
- Ihnat Kančeŭski (pen name Ihnat Abdziralovič, 1896–1923), poet, philosopher and publicist
- Uładzimier Karatkievič (1930–1984), romantic writer.
- Hienadź Klaŭko (1932–1979), poet and translator.
- Jakub Kołas (Kanstancin Mickievič) (1882–1956), poet, dramatist and writer.
- Viktar Andrejevič Korbut (born 1981), journalist
- Moyshe Kulbak (1896–1937), writer.
- Janka Kupała (Ivan Łucevič) (1882–1942), poet and writer.

== Ł ==
- Vaclaŭ Łastoŭski (1883–1938), critic, literary historian and politician.

== M ==
- Viktar Martinowich (b. 1977), writer and journalist.
- Janka Maŭr (1883–1971), writer.
- Ivan Mielež (1921–1976), novelist and playwright.

== N ==
- Uładzimier Niaklajeŭ (born 1946), poet and writer.

== O ==
- Theodore Odrach (1912–1964)
- Napoleon Orda (1807–1883), musician, composer, artist and writer.

== P ==
- Zianon Paźniak (b. 1944), politician.
- Sergiusz Piasecki (1901–1964), writer.
- Alaksandar Patupa (1945–2009), philosopher, scientist and human rights activist.
- Aleś Prudnikaŭ (1910–1941), poet.
- Pavał Prudnikaŭ (1911–2000), writer.
- Jazep Pušča (1902–1964), poet.

== R ==
- Franciszka Urszula Radziwiłłowa (1705–1753), dramatist and writer.
- Ryhor Reles (1913–2004), Jewish writer in Yiddish.
- Alexander Rypinski (1809–1886), poet, translator and folklorist.

== S ==
- Leŭ Sapieha (1557–1663), nobleman and statesman.
- Francysk Skaryna (c. 1490 – c. 1551), publisher and translator.
- Aleksandr Skorobogatov (born 1963)
- Uładzimier Sodal (1937–2015), specialist in literature, journalist, researcher, local historian.
- Uładzisłaŭ Syrakomla (1823–1862), romantic poet, writer and translator.

== Š ==
- Ivan Šamiakin (1921–2004), socialist realist writer.
- Fabijan Šantyr (1887 - 1920), Belarusian poet, writer and public figure who is regarded as “the first victim of [the Bolsheviks] in…Belarusian politics and literature”.
- Karłas Šerman (1934–2005), translator.

== T ==
- Maksim Tank (Jaŭhien Skurko) (1912–1995), poet and translator.
- Kiryła Turaŭski (1130–1182), bishop and saint.
- Siarhiej Trachimionak (b. 1950), writer, screenwriter.

== V ==
- Lavon Volski (born 1965), musician, writer and painter.
- Joannis Vislicensis (c. 1485/90–1520), epic poet.
