= Belarusian literature =

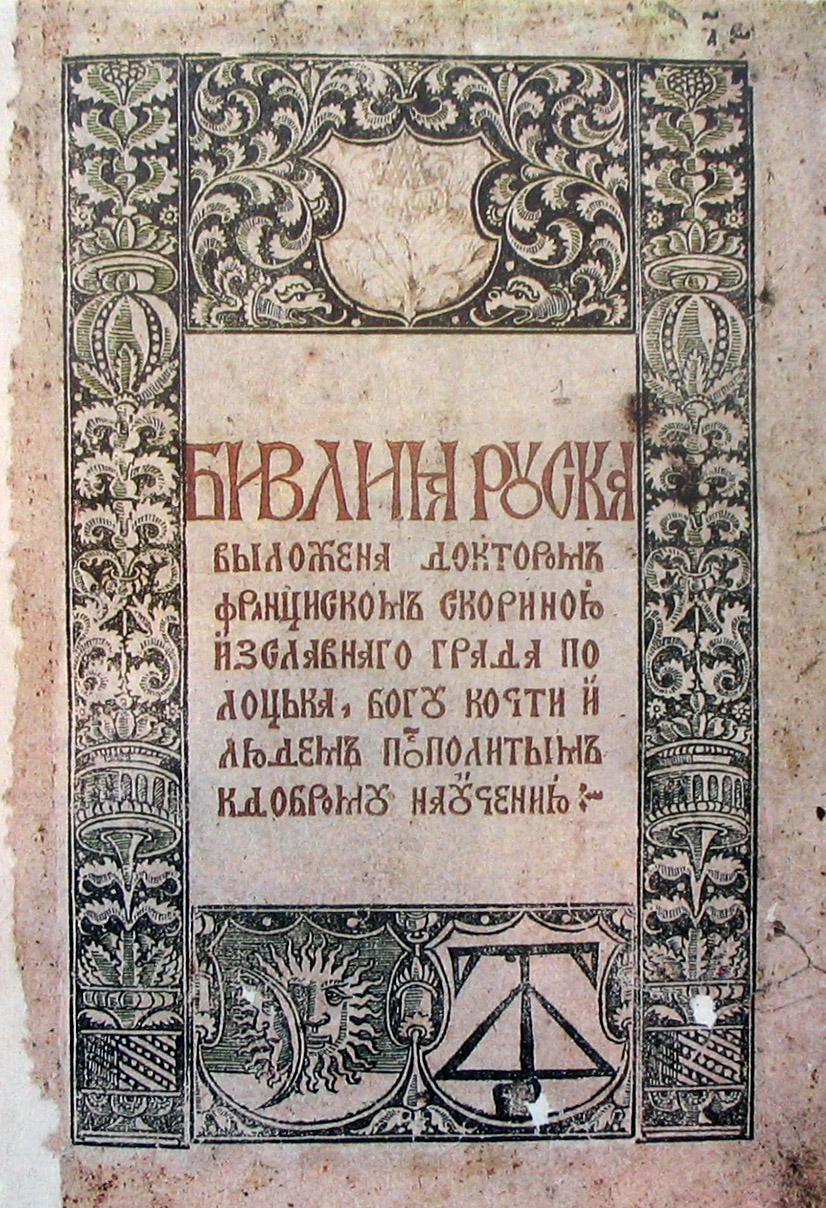
"Bible Ruska, posted by Dr. Francis Skaryna from the glorious city of Polotsk"...

Belarusian literature (Belarusian: Беларуская лiтаратура, romanized: Biełaruskaja litaratura) is the writing produced, both prose and poetry, by speakers (not necessarily native speakers) of the Belarusian language.

== History ==
=== Pre-17th century ===
Belarusian literature was formed from the common basis of Kievan Rus' literary tradition, which also gave rise to Ukrainian literature and Russian literature. A separate literary tradition of Belarus became apparent only in the 14th–15th centuries, when together with Ukraine it developed the Ruthenian language, which would gradually diverge into northern (Belarusian) and southern (Ukrainian) varieties. The old Belarusian literature experienced its golden age in the 16th–17th centuries, when the Old Belarusian language was the official language of the Great Duchy of Lithuania. The Statutes of the Great Duchy of 1529, 1566 and 1588, as well as polemic religious literature were all published in Old Belarusian language. Since the early 16th century Belarusian literary works have been printed. The first printed Belarusian book (in the version of Old Belarusian) was Psaltyr, which was printed in Prague by Francysk Skaryna in 1517 (this was the first book to be printed in an East Slavonic language). Another well-known, influential work of that era was the Chronicle of the Grand Duchy of Lithuania, Ruthenia and Samogitia. During the 16th and 17th century poetry and drama (see Simeon Polotsky) appeared in Belarusian literature under the influence of a more developed Polish literature.

=== 18th and 19th centuries ===
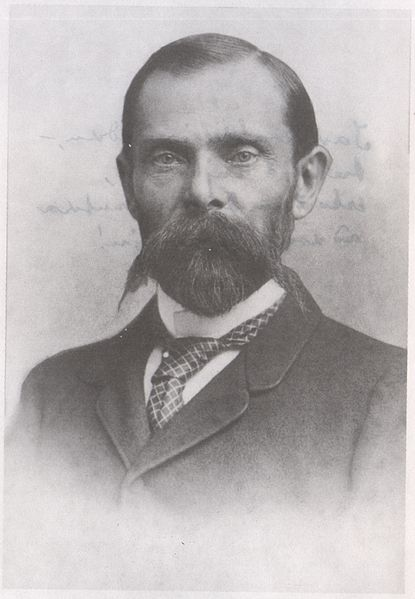
Francišak Bahuševič

Due to the cultural dominance of the Polish language within the Polish–Lithuanian Commonwealth and the Russian language within the Russian Empire, Belarusian language was used only occasionally in the 18th century literature, most notably by the dramatists Kajetan Moraszewski and Michal Ciecierski, who mixed Polish-speaking and Belarusian-speaking characters in their comedies. The literary renaissance began in the 19th century. Anonymous burlesque poems Inside-out Aeneid (1820s) and Taras on Parnassus (ca. 1855) appeared in circulation and were eventually published. Several works were contributed by local-born authors who also wrote in Polish (Jan Barszczewski, Jan Czeczot, Vincent Dunin-Marcinkievič, Alaksandar Rypinski). The second half of the 19th century saw the rise of Realism (Francišak Bahuševič, Adam Hurynovič, Janka Łučyna). In the last quarter of the century multiple publications of Belarusian folklore appeared, notably the multi-volume collection by Jeŭdakim Ramanaŭ. In this period, both Belarusian Latin alphabet and Cyrillic alphabet were actively used.

Separately in Belarusian literature is the Polish-language work of Adam Mickiewicz. His work is often attributed to the “Belarusian school” of Polish-language literature—representatives of this school, following Mickiewicz, wrote on the themes of the life of the Belarusian people, paying great attention to folklore. The influence of Mickiewicz can be traced in the works of Jan Barszczewski, Władysław Syrokomla, Vintsent Dunin-Martsinkyevich, Francišak Bahuševič.

=== Early 20th century ===
A new period started after the 1905 Russian Revolution, when the first Belarusian-language newspapers were established in Vilnius (Naša Dola and Naša Niva). They brought together a circle of writers, who were arguing for developing the Belarusian language and its literature (including Janka Kupała, Maksim Bahdanovič, Źmitrok Biadula, Maksim Harecki, Jakub Kołas). The Belarusian literature of the time combined elements of Romanticism, Realism and Modernism.

=== World War I ===
During World War I and the proclamation of the Belarusian People's Republic (1918), the key themes within the Belarusian literature were patriotism and common life.

=== Interwar period ===
After the establishment of the Byelorussian Soviet Socialist Republic (BSSR) in 1919, literary life in Belarus was concentrated around the magazines Maładniak (1923–1928) and Uzvyšša (1926–1931), which were published by a group of Belarusian writers. Besides the authors from the previous periods (Źmitrok Biadula, Jakub Kołas), this was a period of active work of poets Michaś Čarot, Uładzimier Duboŭka, Petro Glebka, Aleś Dudar, and writers Maksim Harecki, Ciška Hartny, Jurka Vićbič and Kuźma Čorny. Outside of Belarus, Belarusian literature developed as well—in Vilnius, Kaunas, Prague (Michaś Mašara, Kazimier Svajak). In 1934, the Union of Writers of BSSR was established in Minsk. The tradition of socialist realism appeared in the 1930s. Many writers perished in the 1937 mass execution of Belarusians.

=== Post-war period ===
After the end of the World War II, the key themes for the new Belarusian literature were war time experiences, the life of Belarusians in the Soviet Union and national history (in particular, novels by Ivan Mielež and Ivan Šamiakin). Since the 1960s a new theme of morality appeared in the Belarusian prose. Many writers have been fighting for freedom of speech for the authors (in particular, Vasil Bykaŭ and Uładzimier Karatkievič).

There are several Belarusian authors who have left Belarus and now work in emigration (for instance, Natalla Arsieńnieva and Aleś Sałaviej).

Among leading literary magazines of Belarus are Litaratura i mastactva (since 1932) and Połymia (since 1922).

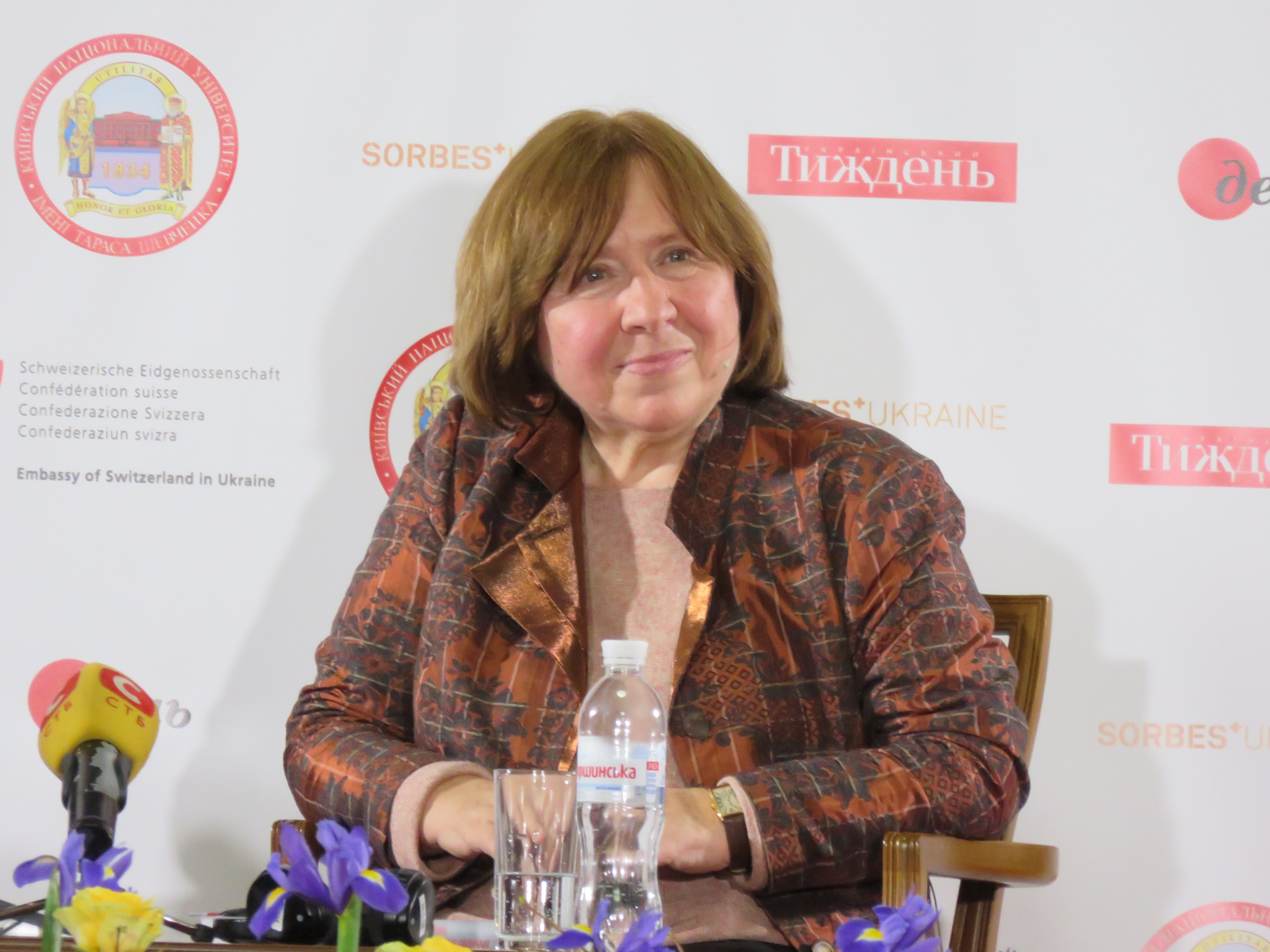
Svetlana Alexievich was awarded the 2015 Nobel Prize in Literature.

In 2015, Belarusian investigative journalist and prose writer Svetlana Alexievich was awarded the 2015 Nobel Prize in Literature "for her polyphonic writings, a monument to suffering and courage in our time".

== Famous Belarusian writers ==
16th century

- Symon Budny
- Andrej Rymsza

19th century

- Jan Barszczewski
- Jan Czeczot

Inter-war period

- Michaś Čarot
- Kuźma Čorny
- Jakub Kołas
- Janka Kupała
- Francišak Umiastoŭski

After-war years

- Aleś Adamovič
- Uładzimier Arłoŭ
- Ryhor Baradulin
- Janka Bryl
- Vasil Bykaŭ
- Larysa Hienijuš
- Sakrat Janovič
- Uładzimier Karatkievič
- Hienadź Klaŭko
- Ivan Melezh
- Ivan Šamiakin
- Masiej Siadnioŭ

Contemporary writers

- Svetlana Alexievich
- Alhierd Bacharevič
- Rajisa Baravikova
- Sasha Filipenko
- Adam Hlobus
- Viktar Martinowich
- Valzhyna Mort
- Aleś Razanaŭ
- Eduard Skobieleŭ
- Oleg Grushecki

== See also ==
- List of libraries in Belarus
