= List of Belarusian-language poets =

The following is a list of Belarusian-language poets

== 16th century ==
Poet	Portrait	Date	Birthplace	Notable Works
Andrej Rymša		c. 1550 - after 1595	Penchyn, Nowogrodek voivodeship, Grand duchy of Lithuania	Panegyrical poetry
Andrej Mužyloŭski		1580s - 1640s	Ruthenian lands, Polish-Lithuanian Commonwealth	
Liavon Mamonič		second half of the 16th century - after 1625	Ruthenian lands, Grand duchy of Lithuania	Panegyrical poetry
Jan Kazimir Paškievič		second half of the 16th century - 1636	Ruthenian lands, Grand duchy of Lithuania	Polska kvitniet lacinoju, Litva kvitniet rusčyznoju..." (Poland blossoms in Latin, Lithuania blossoms in Ruthenian, 1621)
Spiridon Sobol		1580s/90s - 1645	Mahilou, Polish-Lithuanian Commonwealth	"Na herb vielmožnych Ich milostiej panov Stiekievičov"
Afanasij Sieliecki		first half of the 17th century	Ruthenian lands, Polish-Lithuanian Commonwealth	"Utvierdi nas, hospodi, u vieri stoati" (1610)

== 18th century ==
Poet	Portrait	Date	Birthplace	Notable Works
Jan Čačot		1796-1847	Maliushychy, Slonim Governorate, Russian Empire	"Jažovyja imianiny" (1819), "Da pakińcie horla drać" (1819)
Jan Barščeŭski		1796-1851	Murahi, Vitebsk Governorate, Russian Empire	"Dziewańka" (The Maiden, 1809)", "Harelicka" (1843), "Rabunki mužykoŭ" (Peasant Robberies, 1812) and reworked folk song "Ziaziulia" (Cuckoo, 1843)
Ihnat Liehatovič		1796-1867	Malaja Kaplica, Slonim Governorate, Russian Empire	"Skaży Wielmożny Panie, szczo w naszym budzie stanie?"

== 19th century ==
Poet	Portrait	Date	Birthplace	Notable Works
Franc Blus		?-1884	Mogilev Governorate, Russian Empire	
Vintsent Dunin-Marcinkievič		1808-1884	Paniushkavychi, Minsk Governorate, Russian Empire	
Paŭliuk Bahrym		1812-1891	Kroshyn, Grodno Governorate, Russian Empire	
Stanislaŭ Zambžycki		1823/24-1907	Viazynka, Minsk Governorate, Russian Empire	Hutarka Staluka, Sud kata u Wajteliach, Karty
Kanstancin Vieranicyn		1834-1903	Astraulianie, Vitebsk Governorate, Russian Empire	Possibly the author of the popular satyrical-humorous poem "Taras na Parnasie" (1850s)
Jaliehi Pranciš Vuĺ		1835-1894	Vitebsk, Vitebsk Governorate, Russian Empire	
Kastuś Kalinoŭski		1838-1864	Mostowlany, Grodno Governorate, Russian Empire	
Aĺhierd Abuchovič		1840-1898	Kalatsichy, Minsk Governorate, Russian Empire	
Francišak Bahuševič		1840-1900	Svirany, Vilna Governorate, Russian Empire	
Karuś Kahaniec		1868-1918	Tobolsk, West Siberia Governorate-General, Russian Empire	
Adam Hurynovič		1869-1894	Kavali, Vilna Governorate, Russian Empire	
Ałaiza Paškievič		1876-1916	Shchuchyn District, Vilna Governorate, Russian Empire	
Darafiej Bochan		1878-1942	Minsk, Minsk Governorate, Russian Empire	
Jazep Dyla		1880-1973	Slutsk, Minsk Governorate, Russian Empire	
Jakub Kołas		1882-1956	Akinchytsy, Minsk Governorate, Russian Empire	
Janka Kupała		1882-1942	Viazynka, Minsk Governorate, Russian Empire	
Janka Bylina		1883-1956	Laktsiany, Vilna Governorate, Russian Empire	
Liudas Gira		1884-1946	Vilna, Vilna Governorate, Russian Empire	
Źmitrok Biadulia		1886-1941	Pasadzets, Vilna Governorate, Russian Empire	
Anatoĺ Dziarkač		1887-1937	Turec, Grodno Governorate, Russian Empire	
Alieś Harun		1887-1920	Novy Dvor, Minsk Governorate, Russian Empire	
Ivan Daraškievič		1890-1943	Mialieshki, Grodno Governorate, Russian Empire	
Maksim Bahdanovič		1891-1917	Minsk, Minsk Governorate, Russian Empire	
Kanstancyja Bujlo		1893-1986	Vilna, Vilna Governorate, Russian Empire	
Alfons Pietraškievič		1894-1918	Vintsantova, Vilna Governorate, Russian Empire	
Uladzislaŭ Kazloŭski		1896-1943	Zalesie, Grodno Governorate, Russian Empire	
Ihnat Kančeŭski		1896-1923	Vilna, Vilna Governorate, Russian Empire	
Edvard Vajvadziš		1897-2000	Vaivady, Vitebsk Governorate, Russian Empire	
Uladzislaŭ Hrynievič		1897-1978	Struki, Vilna Governorate, Russian Empire	
Adam Babareka		1899-1938	Slabada-Kuchynka, Minsk Governorate, Russian Empire	
Aliaksiej Traiecki		1900-1937	?, Russian Empire	
Uladzimier Žylka		1900-1933	Makashy, Minsk Governorate, Russian Empire	
Horavid		19th century	Russian Empire	"Paliakam u dzień 3-ha maja" (For the Poles on the 3rd of May, 1891), "Ja kliču vas…" (I am calling you, published in 1909)

== 20th century ==
Poet	Portrait	Date	Birthplace	Notable Works
Hanna Breskaja		1901-193?	Zialki, Vitebsk Governorate, Russian Empire	
Uladzimier Duboŭka		1901-1976	Aharodniki, Vilno Governorate, Russian Empire	
Anatoĺ Voĺny		1902-1937	Pukhavichy, Minsk Governorate, Russian Empire	
Viera Vajciulievič		1902-1986	Biarozki, Vitebsk Governorate, Russian Empire	
Nataĺlia Arsieńnieva		1903-1997	Baku, Baku Governorate, Russian Empire	
Todar Klaštorny		1903-1937	Parečča, Vitebsk Region, Russian Empire	
Apanas Atava		1903-1962	Niazviaztsy, Minsk Governorate, Russian Empire	
Mikola Dvarecki		1903-1988	Ikazn, Vitebsk Governoreate, Russian Empire	
Francišak Hryškievič		1904/06-1946	Sukhavolia, Grodno Governorate, Russian Empire	
Piatro Hliebka		1905-1969	Vialikaja Usa, Minsk Governorate, Russian Empire	
Aliaksandr Viečar		1905-1985	Mashchytsy, Minsk Governorate, Russian Empire	
Paŭliuk Anańjeŭ		1905-1932	Andraskovichy, Vitebsk Governorate, Russian Empire	
Janka Bobryk		1905-1942	Hlusk, Minsk Governorate, Russian Empire	
Michaś Vasiliok		1905-1960	Babrounia, Grodno Governorate, Russian Empire	
Piatruś Broŭka		1905-1980	Putsilkavichy, Minsk Governorate, Russian Empire	
Andrej Alieksandrovič		1906-1963	Minsk, Minsk Governorate, Russian Empire	
Janka Bahdanovič		1906-1990	Hirbiniata, Vilna Governorate, Russian Empire	
Zachar Birala		1906-1993	Raunapollie, Minsk Governorate, Russian Empire	
Nataĺlia Višnieŭskaja		1907-1989	Kovno, Kovno Governorate, Russian Empire	
Siarhiej Dziarhaj		1907-1980	Minsk, Minsk Governorate, Russian Empire	
Alieś Zvonak		1907-1996	Minsk, Minsk Governorate, Russian Empire	
Michaś Bahun		1908-1938	Minsk, Minsk Governorate, Russian Empire	
Aŭhien Bartuĺ		1908-1992	Saint Petersburg, St. Petersburg Governorate, Russian Empire	
Hanna Bazylienka		1908-1980	Arakhi, Mogilev Governorate, Russian Empire	
Branislaŭ Liuhoŭski		1908-1942	Vitebsk, Vitebsk Governorate, Russian Empire	
Siarhiej Darožny		1909-1943	Slonim, Grodno Governorate, Russian Empire	
Zinaida Bandaryna		1909-1959	Grodna, Grodno Governorate, Russian Empire	
Uladzimier Korban		1910-1971	Barań, Vitebsk Governorate, Russian Empire	
Alieś Žaŭruk		1910-1972	Sianno, Mogilev Governorate, Russian Empire	
Aryna Hlinskaja		1910-1997	Mscislau, Mogilev Governorate, Russian Empire	
Źmitrok Astapienka		1910-1944	Siarhieieuka, Mogilev Governorate, Russian Empire	
Alieś Prudnikaŭ		1910-1941	village Stary Dzedzin, Klimovichskiy Uyezd, Mogilev Governorate, Russian Empire	
Larysa Hienjuš		1910-1983	Zhlobaucy, Grodno Governorate, Russian Empire	
Anatoĺ Astrejka		1911-1978	Piasochnaie, Minsk Governorate, Russian Empire	
Aliaksiej Zarycki		1911-1987	Chocimsk, Mogilev Governorate, Russian Empire	
Vasiĺ Vitka		1911-1996	Eulichy, Minsk Governorate, Russian Empire	
Paviel Prudnikaŭ		1911-2000	village Stary Dzedzin, Klimovichskiy Uyezd, Mogilev Governorate, Russian Empire	
Piatruś Biadulin		1912-1940	Dzernavaia, Mogilev Governorate, Russian Empire	
Klim Hrynievič		1912-1941	Shastsiorauka, Mogilev Governorate, Russian Empire	
Piatro Biteĺ		1912-1991	Vishneva, Vilna Governorate, Russian Empire	
Maksim Tank		1912-1995	Piĺkaŭščyna, Vilna Governorate, Russian Empire	
Źmitro Vitalin		1912-2004	Sukhoie, Minsk Governorate, Russian Empire	
Siarhiej Astrejka		1913-1937	Kalasaushchyna, Minsk Governorate, Russian Empire	
Siarhiej Hrachoŭski		1913-2002	Novel, Minsk Governorate, Russian Empire	
Edzi Ahniaćviet		1913-2000	Minsk, Minsk Governorate, Russian Empire	
Anton Bialievič		1914-1978	Dubrouka, Minsk Governorate, Russian Empire	
Fiodar Budźko		1914-2002	Vyzna, Minsk Governorate, Russian Empire	
Mikola Hvazdoŭ		1916-1938(?)	Polatsk, Vitebsk Governorate, Russian Empire	
Jaŭhien Vasilionak		1917-1973	Orsha, Mogilev Governorate, Soviet occupied Russian Republic	
Lieanid Haŭrylaŭ		1918-1941(?)	Berdyzh, Minsk Governorate, Russian Republic	
Alieś Bažko		1918-	Dauhinava, Minsk Governorate, Belarusian People's Republic	
Alieś Bačyla		1918-1983	Leshnitsa, Minsk Governorate, Belarusian People's Republic	
Eduard Valasievič		1918-1997	Mahilou, Belarusian People's Republic	
Arkadź Hiejne		1919-1942	Beshankovichy, Vitebsk Governorate, Socialist Soviet Republic of Belarus	
Alieś Astapienka		1920-1970	Syrskaja Buda, Gomel Governorate, Socialist Soviet Republic of Lithuania and Belarus	
Aliaksiej Koršak		1920-1945	Vuhly, Minsk Region, Socialist Soviet Republic of Lithuania and Belarus	
Mikola Aŭramčyk		1920-2017	Pliosy, Gomel Governorate, Socialist Soviet Republic of Lithuania and Belarus	
Ivan Hurban		1922-1999	Yushavichy, Nowogrodek Voivodeship, Second Polish Republic	
Uladzimier Kalieśnik		1922-1994	Siniaŭskaja Slabada, Nowogródek voivodeship, Second Polish Republic	
Anatoĺ Vialiuhin		1923-1994	Mashkany, Vitebsk Governorate, Belarusian SSR	
Heorhij Valkavycki		1923-2013	Bielaviezha, Bialystok Voivodeship, Second Polish Republic	
Vitaĺ Hubarevič		1926-1976	Navaelnia, Novogrodek Voivodeship, Second Polish Republic	
Jaša Burš		1929-2007	Baranavichy, Nowogrodek Voivodeship, Second Polish Republic	
Mikalaj Aročka		1930-2013	Vetsiavichy, Second Polish Republic	
Viktar Dajlida		1930-2006	Slavinsk, Mink Region, Belarusian SSR, USSR	
Aliaksandr Barščeŭski		1930-2022	Bondary, Podlachian Voivodeship, Second Polish Republic	
Hienadz Kliauko		1931-1979	village Varoničy, Puchavičy District, Minsk Region, Belarusian SSR, USSR	
Ściapan Haŭrusioŭ		1931-1988	Nova-Aliaksandrauka, Mahiliou Region, Belarusian SSR, USSR	
Nil Hilievič		1931-2016	Slabada, Minsk Region, Belarusian SSR, USSR	
Anatoĺ Viarcinski		1931-2022	Dziameshkava, Vitsebsk Region, Belarusian SSR, USSR	
Hienadź Kliaŭko		1931-1979	Varoničy, Minsk Region, Belarusian SSR, USSR	
Tadzijana Kliaštornaja		1932-2011	Minsk, Minsk Region, Belarusian SSR, USSR	
Mikola Hryšan		1933-2017	Chernikhava, Nowogrodek Voivodeship, Second Polish Republic	
Jurka Hienjuš		1935-1985	Zelva, Bialystok Voivodeship, Second Polish Republic	
Alieś Kornieŭ		1935-2022	Mahiloŭ, Mahilou Region, Belarusian SSR, USSR	
Ryhor Baradulin		1935-2014	Haradok 2, Vitsebsk Region, Belarusian SSR, USSR	
Nina Halinoŭskaja		1935-2025	Vialikia Lazicy, Mahilou Region, Belarusian SSR, USSR	
Hienadź Buraŭkin		1936-	Shuliatsina, Minsk Region, Belarusian SSR, USSR	
Jan Hryb		1936-	Kurshynavichy, Brest Region, Belarusian SSR, USSR	
Alieh Žukaŭ		1937-2024	Dnipropetrovsk, Dnipropetrovsk Region, Ukrainian SSR, USSR	Song lyrics
Danuta Bičeĺ-Zahnietava		1937/38-	Biskuptsy, Nowogrodek Voivodeship, Second Polish Republic	
Anatoĺ Hračanikaŭ		1938-1991	Sharpilauka, Homel Region, Belarusian SSR, USSR	
Mikalaj Viniacki		1939-2013	Chyhirynka, Mahilou Region, Belarusian SSR, USSR	
Alieh Biembieĺ		1939-	Minsk, Minsk Region, Belarusian SSR, USSR	
Vasiĺ Žukovič		1939-	Dzmitravichy, Polesian Voivodeship, German-occupied Poland	
Anatoĺ Kirvieĺ		1939-2008	Vituničy, Minsk Region, Belarusian SSR	
Viktar Kaźko		1940-	Kalienkavichy, Homel Region, Belarusian SSR, USSR	
Mikola Buśko		1940-2023	Paharelka, Baranavichy Region, Belarusian SSR, USSR	
Arkadź Dzienisievič		1940-	Vashchynichy, Brest Region, Belarusian SSR, USSR	
Jaŭhien Hučok		1940-2024	Slutsk, Minsk Region, Belarusian SSR, USSR	
Uladzimir Hajduk		1941-2012	Tarnopol, Podlachian Voivodeship, German occupied Belarusian SSR	
Eduard Zubrycki		1942-2008	Shkliancy, Vitsebsk Region, German occupied Belarusian SSR	
Ivan Arabiejka		1942-	Khmeleva, Brest Vobslast, German occupied Belarusian SSR	
Siarhiej Davidovič		1942-	Karpilauka, Minsk Region, German occupied Belarusian SSR	
Vadzim Bolbas		1942-	Kazakova, Mahilou Vobslast, German occupied Belarusian SSR	
Viera Viarba		1942-2012	Vysoki Haradzec, Vitsebsk Region, German occupied Belarusian SSR	
Nadzieja Artymovič		1946-2023	Auhustova, Podlachian Voivodeship, Poland	
Viktar Hardziej		1946-2025	Malyia Kruhovichy, Pinsk Region, Belarusian SSR	
Sviatlana Basumatrava		1946-2016	Mazyr, Polessian Region, Belarusian SSR, USSR	
Jurka Holub		1947-2020	Horna, Baranavichy Region, Belarusian SSR, USSR	
Alieś Kamaroŭski		1947-	Mikalaeŭščyna, Baranavichy Region, Belarusian SSR, USSR	
Raisa Baravikova		1947-	Pieshki, Brest Region, Belarusian SSR, USSR	
Fieliks Batoryn		1948-	Minsk, Minsk Region, Belarusian SSR, USSR	
Navum Haĺpiarovič		1948-	Polatsk, Polatsk Region, Belarusian SSR, USSR	
Liudmila Zabalockaja		1949-2021	Krychau, Mahiliov Region, Belarusian SSR, USSR	
Leanid Halubovič		1950-	Varonina, Minsk Region, Belarusian SSR, USSR	
Chviedar Hurynovič		1950-	Kryvichy, Babruisk Region, Belarusian SSR, USSR	
Michaś Bašlakoŭ		1951-	Tserukha, Homel Region, Belarusian SSR, USSR	
Alieś Kasko		1951-2017	Čudzin, Brest Region, Belarusian SSR, USSR	
Aliaksej Biely		1952-	Mikhnavichy, Brest Region, Belarusian SSR, USSR	
Zinaida Hascilovič		1952-	Reuki, Minsk Region, Belarusian SSR, USSR	
Vitaĺ Haranovič		1952-2012	Jermaki, Minsk Region, Belarusian SSR, USSR	
Valiancina Aksak		1953-	Smalichy, Baranavichy Vobslast, Belarusian SSR, USSR	
Mikalaj Aliachnovič		1953-2022	Valishcha, Brest Region, Belarusian SSR, USSR	
Alieh Ablažej		1954-2016	Lezniavichy, Hrodna Region, Belarusian SSR, USSR	
Hienadź Aŭlasienka		1955-	Lipaviets, Vitebsk Region, Belarusian SSR, USSR	
Liavon Valasiuk		1955-	Piescianki, Brest Region, Belaursian SSR, USSR	
Stanislaŭ Valodźka		1956-	Padolcy, Maladziechna Region, Belarusian SSR, USSR	
Iryna Bahdanovič		1956-	Lida, Hrodna Region, Belarusian SSR, USSR	
Siarhiej Amiaĺčuk		1957-	Rachytsia, Brest Region, Belarusian SSR, USSR	
Ryhor Babčanok		1957-	village Lenin, Brest Region, Belarusian SSR, USSR	
Adam Hlobus		1958-	Dziarzhynsk, Minsk Region, Belarusian SSR, USSR	
Alieś Arkuš		1960-	Zhodzina, Minsk Region, Belarusian SSR, USSR	
Halina Bulyka		1960-	Asava, Hrodna Region, Belarusian SSR, USSR	
Slavamir Adamovič		1962-	Unezhma, Arkhangelsk Region, RSFSR, USSR	
Vasiĺ Debiš		1962-	Shamjatouka, Hrodna Region, Belarusian SSR, USSR	
Eduard Akulin		1963-	Vialikia Niamki, Homel Region, Belarusian SSR, USSR	
Siarhiej Kavalioŭ		1963-	Mahiloŭ, Mahilou Region, Belarusian SSR, USSR	
Ihar Babkoŭ		1964-	Homel, Homel Region, Belarusian SSR, USSR	
Liavon Voĺski		1965-	Minsk, Minsk Region, Belarusian SSR, USSR	
Alieś Badak		1966-	Turki, Vitsebsk Region, Belarusian SSR, USSR	
Źmicier Bartosik		1968-	Rybinsk, Yaroslavl Region, Russian SFSR, USSR	
Usievalad Haračka		1968-	Jucki, Minsk Region, Belarusian SSR, USSR	
Iryna Darafiejčuk		1969-	Chudzin, Brest Region, Belarusian SSR, USSR	
Juryj Humianiuk		1969-2013	Hrodna, Hrodna Region, Belarusian SSR, USSR	
Aksana Daniĺčyk		1970-	Minsk, Minsk Region, Belarusian SSR, USSR	
Taćciana Barysiuk		1971-	Minsk, Minsk Region, Belarusian SSR, USSR	
Aliaksandr Brazhunoŭ		1972-		Izmrahd (2010)
Źmicier Višnioŭ		1973-	Debrecen, Hungarian People's Republic	
Alieh Hrušecki		1974-	Minsk, Minsk Region, Belarusian SSR, USSR	
Uladzimir Bliudnik		1975-	Dzialtava, Hrodna Region, Belarusian SSR, USSR	
Jaŭhien Bartnicki		1976-	Luhamavichy, Hrodna Region, Belarusian SSR, USSR	
Anatoĺ Brusievič		1977-	Hrodna, Hrodna Region, Belarusian SSR, USSR	
Viera Burlak		1977-	Kyiv, Kyiv Region, Ukrainian SSR, USSR	
Źmicier Arciuch		1978-	Rutka 2, Hrodna Region, Belarusian SSR, USSR	
Valzhyna Mort		1981-	Minsk, Minsk Region, Belarusian SSR, USSR	
Anatoĺ Ivaščanka		1981-	Minsk, Minsk Region, Belarusian SSR, USSR	
Anton Bryĺ		1982-	Minsk, Minsk Region, Belarusian SSR, USSR	
Andrej Adamovič		1984-	Minsk, Minsk Region, Belarusian SSR, USSR	
Taćciana Bielanohaja		1984-	Minsk, Minsk Region, Belarusian SSR, USSR	
Aliona Bielanožka		1985-	Mahiloŭ, Mahilou Region, Belarusian SSR, USSR	
Jaraslava Ananka		1987-	? , Ukrainian SSR, USSR	
Śviatlana Bohuš		1987-	Minsk, Minsk Region, Belarusian SSR, USSR	
Iryna Bieĺskaja		1989-	Charnievichy, Vitsebsk Region, Belarusian SSR, USSR	
Artur Kamaroŭski		1991-	Mir, Hrodna Region, Belarusian SSR, USSR	
Julija Aliejčanka		1991-	Vorsha, Vitsebsk Region, Belarus	
Kryścina Banduryna		1992-	Mazyr, Homel Region, Belarus	
Dar’ja Biaĺkievič		1993-	Zhyrovitsy, Hrodna Region, Belarus	
