= List of Belarusians (ethnic group) =

This is a list of people who are descended from the Old Belarusians of the Grand Duchy of Lithuania.

== Archaeologists and anthropologists ==
- Mikalaj Ulaščyk

== Actors and actresses ==
- Raścislaŭ Jankoŭski

== Artists ==
- Michail Savicki, painter
- Marc Chagall, painter

== Engineers ==
- Paval Suchi
- Barys Bielavusaŭ

== Musicians ==
- Anatol Bahatyroŭ
- Dźmitry Smolski
- Viktar Smolski
- Ihar Lučanok
- Vladimir Dukelsky
- Alexander Rybak
- Maria Paula Survilla
- D'arcy Wretzky
- Vladimir Mulyavin

== Philosophers, humanists, and theologians ==
- Symon Budny
- Euphrosyne of Polotsk
- Śpirydon Sobal
- Francysk Skaryna

== Scientists ==
- Zhores Ivanovich Alferov, Nobel Prize winning physicist
- Jury Bandažeŭski
- Fiodar Fiodaraŭ
- Barys Kit
- Alena Karascieleva
- Theodor Narbut
- Uladzimier Platonaŭ, mathematician
- Mikalaj Sudziloŭski
- Jakaŭ Zialdovič

== Sportsmen and sportswomen ==
- Andrej Arloŭski
- Yegor Sharangovich
- Andrej Zyhmantovič
- Uladzimier and Alaksandar Arciemjeŭ
- Anžela Atroščanka
- Viktoryja Azaranka
- Śviatlana Bahinskaja
- Siarhiej Hurenka
- Alaksandar Hleb
- Volha Korbut
- Vital Kutuzaŭ
- Dźmitry Markaŭ
- Uladzimier Maciušenka
- Alexander Medved
- Raman Piatrušenka
- Max Mirny
- Vital Ščerba
- Maria Sharapova
- Julija Nieściarenka
- Darja Domračava
- Aryna Sabalenka
- Aleksandr Karshakevich

== State, revolution, military ==
- Źmicier Daškievič
- Andrei Hramyka
- Alexander Lukashenko
- Alaksandar Milinkievič
- Zianon Paźniak
- Rogneda of Polotsk
- Izyaslav of Polotsk
- Andrei Gromyko
- Ivonka Survilla

== Writers ==
See List of Belarusian writers

- Janka Kupala
- Jakub Kolas
- Kandrat Krapiva
- Maksim Bahdanovič
- Aleś Adamovič
- Ryhor Baradulin
- Mikałaj Husoŭski
- Śviatlana Aleksijevič
- Maksim Tank
- Vasil Bykaŭ
- Vital Voranaŭ
- Vincent Dunin-Marcinkievič
- Nił Hilevič
- Ivan Šamiakin
- Janka Maŭr
- Uladzimier Karatkievič
- Hienadź Klaŭko
- Alaksandar Patupa

== Fashion designers ==
- Dmitry Sholokhov

== See also ==
- Grand Duchy of Lithuania
- Belarusians
- List of people from Belarus
