= Francišak Umiastoŭski =

Belarusian writer, journalist and military leader

- Францішак Умястоўскі
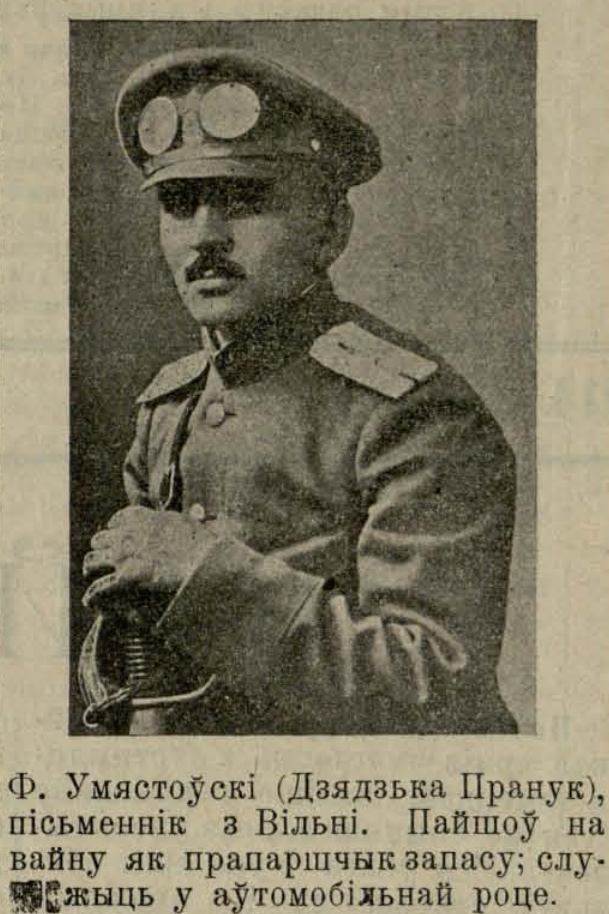
- Umiastoŭski in 1914
- Born: February 10, 1882; Vilnia
- Died: 1940; Katyn massacre
- Cause of death: executed
- Known for: Belarusian writer, journalist, military leader

Francišak Umiastoŭski (Belarusian: Францішак Умястоўскі; 10 February 1882 – 1940?) was a Belarusian writer, journalist, military leader and a victim of the Katyn massacre, described as "one of the forerunners of the Belarusian national movement in the early twentieth century".

== Early life ==
Umiastoŭski was born into a noble family in Vilnia and was a cousin of the playwright Francišak Alachnovič. He studied at the St. Petersburg Institute of Technology. During his studies in 1902-1904, he joined the underground student organisation The Association of Belarusian Education and Culture. His first work (the poem Wind) was published in Kaladnaja Pisanka for 1904 (Petersburg, 1903).

== Involvement in Belarusian national movement ==
In 1905 he returned to Vilnia, which at that time was being transformed into a hub of the Belarusian national movement. In 1906, together with Ivan and Anton Luckievič, Kazimir Kastravicki and Alaiza Paškievič, he started publishing the newspaper Naša Dola ("Our Destiny"), becoming its editor.

In 1908, Umiastoŭski lived in the village of Isnaŭda in Viciebsk province. During 1908–1914, he published stories in the newspaper Naša Niva. The stories: Fear, In the Wood, Plica Polonica Doctor, Not a peasant's mind were written under the obvious influence of Belarusian folklore. He also translated works of Oscar Wilde and Nikolai Gogol.

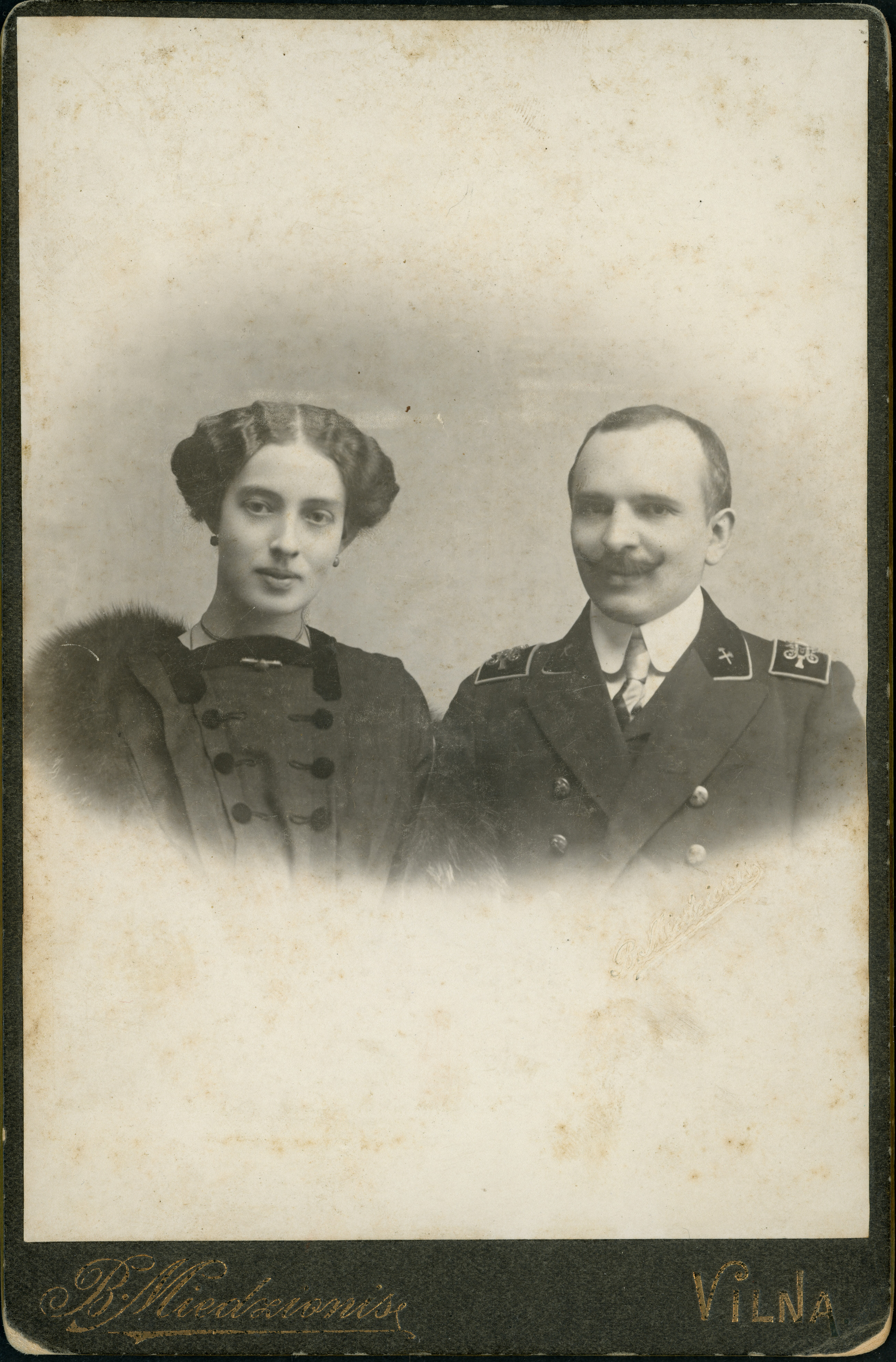
Helena Dunin-Marcinkiewicz and Franciszak Umiastowski (1910s)

In 1914, Umiastoŭski was mobilised into the Russian Imperial Army. From 1919, he was among the main creators of Belarusian military formations and in September 1920, headed the Belarusian military commission. The commission attempted to organise a Belarusian army, which together with Pilsudski's Polish army, would fight against the Bolsheviks.

In the 1920s, Umiastoŭski lived in Vilnia and worked as a publicist. In 1927–1928, he published the newspaper Belarusian Day and Belarusian Culture.

== Arrest and execution ==
He was mobilised in the Polish army as officer at the beginning of World War II, and on 18 September 1939, captured by the advancing Soviet army. Interned in a camp, he was later executed in Katyn.
