= Yanka Bryl =

Belarusian writer (1917–2006)

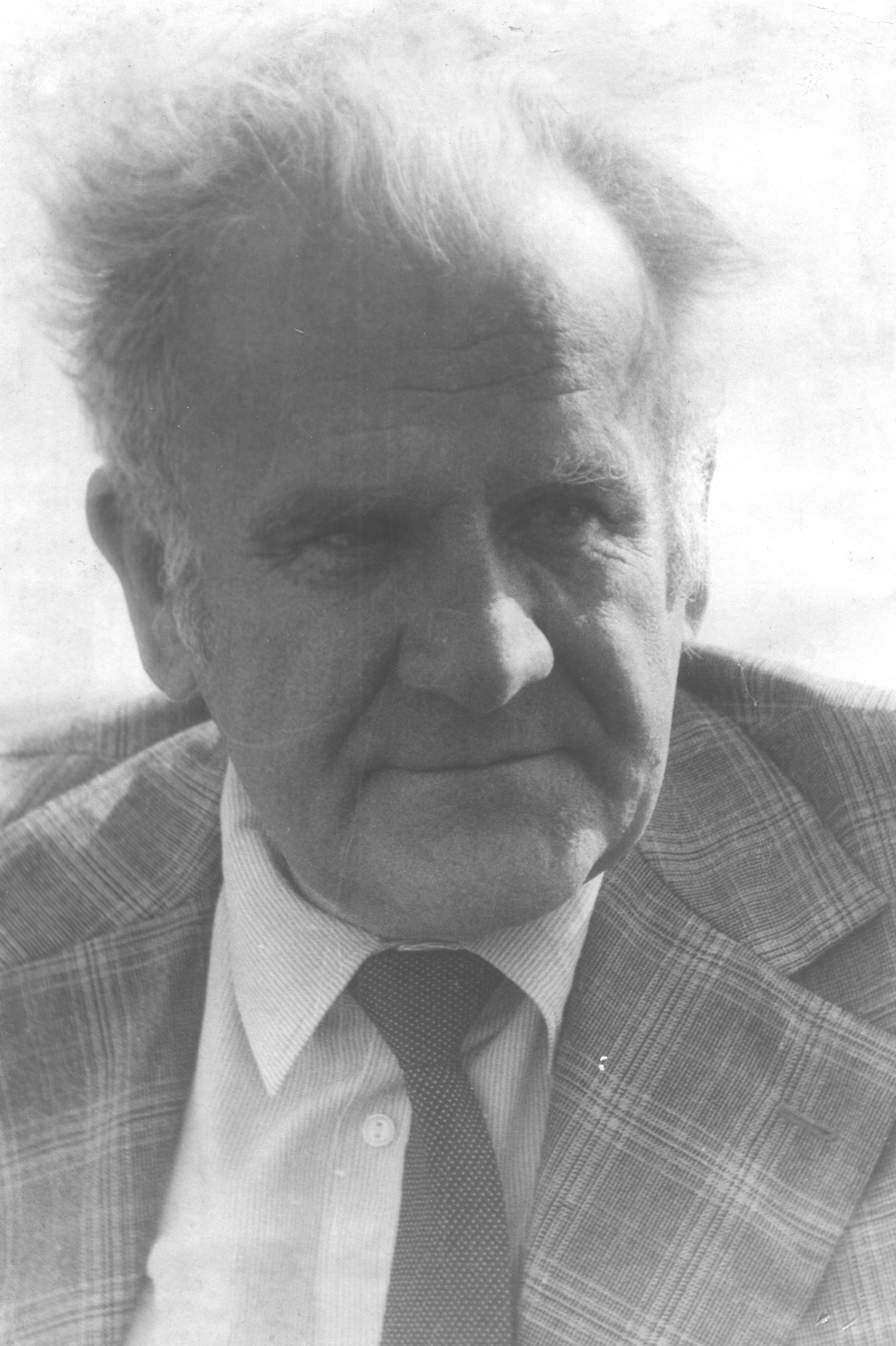
Janka Bryl in 1985

Ivan Antonovich "Janka" Bryl (Belarusian: Янка Брыль; 4 August 1917 – 25 July 2006) was a Soviet and Belarusian writer best known for his short stories. He was one of the older generation of Soviet writers who had begun their literary careers in Stalin's time, but received a new lease on life in the late 1950s, along with such contemporaries as Ivan Shamiakin and Ivan Melezh.

== Biography ==
Bryl's father, Anton Danilovich Bryl, was a railway worker. In 1922, his family returned to their hometown of Zagorje (then in Poland). He was unable to complete his education, due to financial difficulties. In 1939, he was drafted into the Polish Army and was assigned to their equivalent of the Marine Corps. Although he was captured by the Germans at Gdynia, he was able to escape and returned to Belarus, where he joined the partisans and served several groups in different capacities. He began his writing career in Mir as an editor for a partisan newspaper, The Banner of Freedom and contributed pieces to a satirical journal called the Guerrilla Gigolo. Later, he authored various anti-Nazi leaflets for the newspaper Раздавім фашысцкую гадзіну' (Crush the Fascist Vermin).

In October 1944, he moved to Minsk where he worked on several newspapers and magazines, as well as in the State Publishing House and became Secretary of the local writers' union. From 1945, he was a member of the Union of Soviet Writers. He was also elected to the Supreme Soviet of Belarus, serving two terms: 1963-1967 and 1980–1985. From 1989 until his death, he was a member of the Belarusian PEN Center. In addition, He was awarded the Stalin Prize in 1952 and the Jakub Kolas Literature Prize in 1963. In 1981, he was awarded the honorific title of People's Writer of the Byelorussian SSR and in 1994 he was elected to the National Academy of Sciences of Belarus.

Bryl's first story appeared in 1938 and his first short story collection appeared in 1946. The first collection of stories was called Apaviadanni (Stories). Bryl's books are mostly works of psychological fiction and his characters tend to be sensitive and prone to introspection. They were largely set in Belarusian villages and frequently about the people's fight against the Nazis.
