= Adam Hurynowicz =

Belarusian poet and folklorist

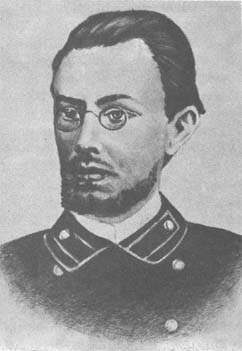
Adam Hurynowicz

Adam Hilary Kalistavich Hurynowicz (Belarusian: Адам Гіляры Калікставіч Гурыновіч/Adam Hilari Kalistavich Hurynovič, Polish: Adam Hilary Kalikstawicz Hurynowicz; 25 January 1869 in Kavali, near Vileysky Uyezd, Vilna Governorate – 4 July 1894 in Russian Empire now Belarus) was a poet and folklorist from the Russian Empire. He was best known for his Polish, Belarusian and Russian-language poems and folkloristics.

He was born to Polish noble family in the village of Kavali. In 1887 until 1893, he graduated at Saint Petersburg State Institute of Technology. As a child he studied at school in Vilnius. He learnt ethnographic material. Hurynowicz was arrested for revolutionary protest in Vilnius and was deported to Saint Petersburg. His influential work was Francišak Bahuševič. He translated works in Russian, Ukrainian and Polish language. He died on 4 July 1894 in Russian Empire, aged 25.
