= Maksim Haretski =

Belarusian prose writer and journalist

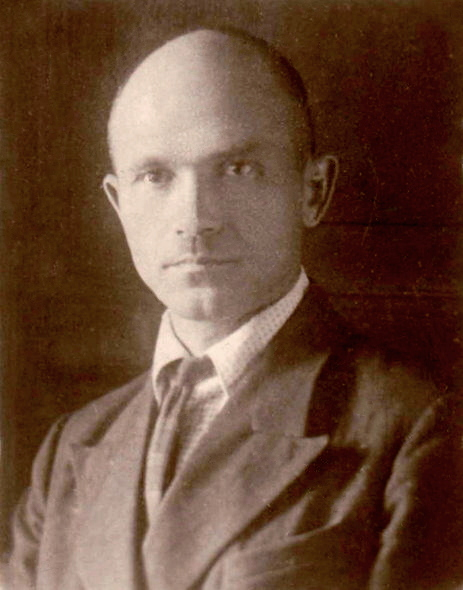
Maksim Harecki

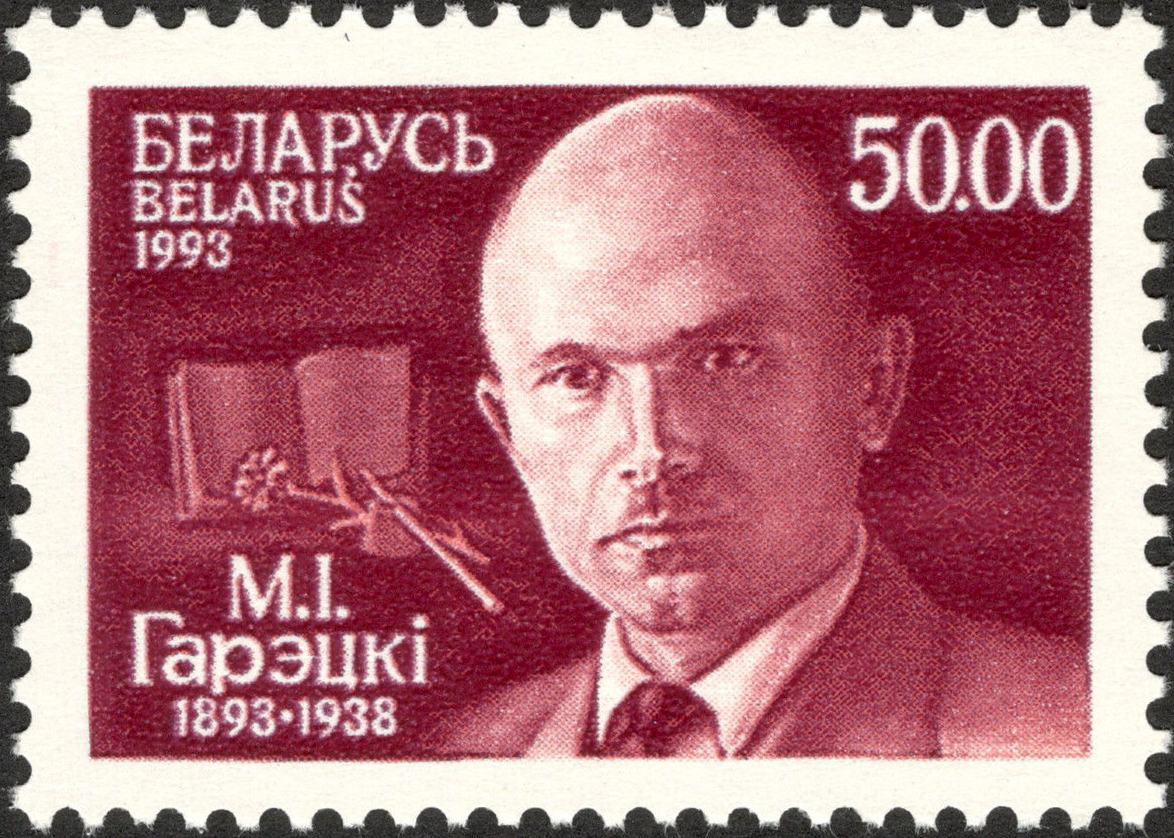
Maksim Haretski on a 1993 Belarusian stamp

Maksim Haretski (18 February 1893 – 10 February 1938; Belarusian: Максі́м Іва́навіч Гарэ́цкі, Russian: Макси́м Ива́нович Горе́цкий), also known as Maksim Harecki and Maksim Goretsky, was a Belarusian prose writer, journalist, activist of the Belarusian national renewal, folklorist, lexicographer, and professor. Maksim Harecki was also known by his pen-names Maksim Biełarus, M.B. Biełarus, M.H., A. Mścisłaŭski, Dzied Kuźma, Maciej Myška, and Mizeryjus Monus. In his works he often appeared as Kuźma Batura, Liavon Zaduma.

Maksim Harecki was born in village of Małaja Bahaćkaŭka in a peasant's family. He had two brothers – Haŭryła and Ivan.

In 1913 Harecki graduated from a college in Hory-Horki, and in 1916 from a military college in Petrograd. During the First World War he served in the Russian Army. He was wounded on October 25, 1914, and had to recover in the military hospitals of Vilnia, Moscow and Mahilioŭ. After that, he continued to serve in the army until 1917 when he got very ill and was sent to Zheleznovodsk to recover and then left the army.

Later on, Harecki moved to Smolensk and studied in the Archaeological University there. At that time he started to work for local newspapers. Soon he moved to Minsk and in January 1919 to Vilnia, where he began working in the Belarusian Gymnasium of Vilnia and some newspapers.

In 1919 he married Leaniła Čarniaŭskaja in Vilnia. His wife worked as a teacher in the Belarusian Gymnasium of Vilnia. They had a son Leanid who died in the battle of Leningrad. Also, they had a daughter, Halina.

In January 1922 Harecki was arrested by Polish authorities as a political criminal and was put into the infamous Łukiszki prison in Vilnia. Following mass protests of the Belarusian minority, he was released and sent to Soviet-controlled East Belarus. There he worked as a language and literature professor at some universities. He was a member of the Inbelkult.

In 1929, along with other Belarusian activists, Harecki became a target of a defamation campaign in the Soviet state media. He was arrested by the Soviets in July 1930 and accused of being a member of the Belarusian Liberation Union, a separatist organization. In April–May 1931 he was sentenced to five years of prison in Viatka. During this time Harecki wrote a lot of literature works. On November 4, 1937, he was arrested again and later on shot in the Great Purge. He was rehabilitated in 1957.

Today Maksim Harecki is considered a classic of Belarusian literature. His books were translated into Ukrainian, Russian, Polish, and German.
