= Viktar Andrejevič Korbut =

Viktar Andrejevič Korbut (born 21 September 1981, Minsk) is a Belarusian journalist, local historian, and guide. He is a member of the Belarusian Union of Journalists (since 2007) and member of International Association of Belarusian Studies Researchers (since 2016).

== Early life ==
He is a graduate of the Jakub Kolas National State Humanities Lyceum (1998), the Belarusian State University of Culture (2003) majoring in Museum Studies and the protection of historical and cultural heritage (museology).

== Career ==
Korbut is the author of the books Minsk. The Best View to This City (2013), From Minsk to Vilnius. Belarus’ history in journalistic notes (2016), the series of postcards Vilnius – Viĺnia. The Capital of Lithuania in the History of Belarus (2015). He is compiling a guidebook on the places of Vilnius connected with the Belarusian history and culture.

The author writes guides for the cities of Minsk, The Best View to This City. 10 centuries within 3 hours, Vilnius, Viĺnia. The Capital of Lithuania in the History of Belarus.

== Recognition ==
- Winner of the 8th National competition of print media "Golden Letter" (2012) in the category The Best Materials on Cultural and Local History Themes
- Laureate of the Belarusian Union of Journalists prize (2015) for the best work in artistic and publicistic genre
