= Sasha Filipenko =

Belarusian writer and journalist

- Саша Філіпенка
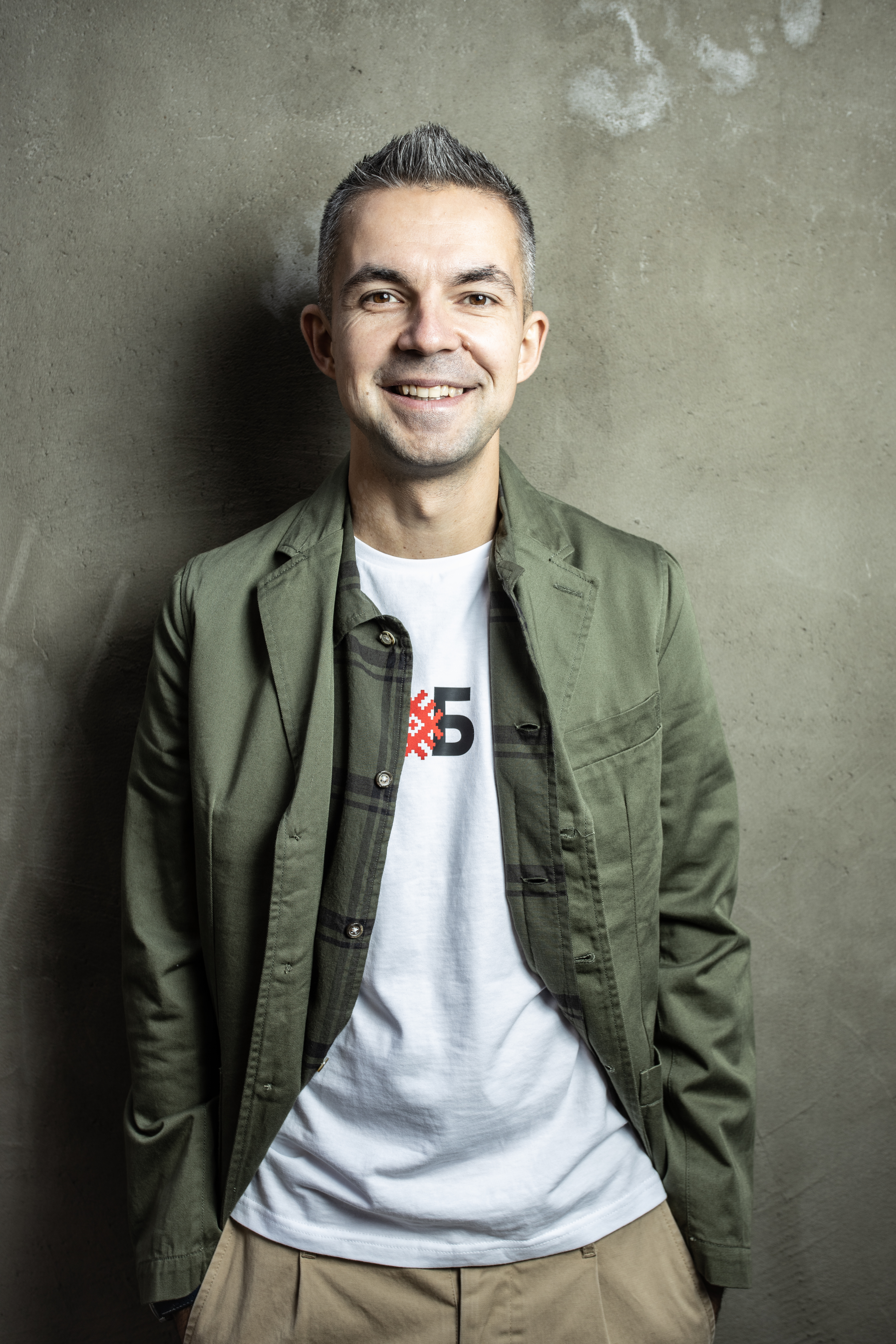
- Filipenko in 2020
- Born: July 12, 1984 (age 42); Minsk, Soviet Union
- Occupations: Writer and journalist
- Website: filipenko.taplink.ws

Sasha Filipenko (Russian: Саша Филипенко, Belarusian: Саша Філіпенка) is a Belarusian writer, journalist, and TV show host. His books were translated into more than 15 languages. Plays, based on his works were staged in Berlin, Kyiv, Moscow, St. Petersburg, and Vilnius. In 2021 PEN International declared Filipenko a victim of censorship. He currently lives in Switzerland with his wife and son, since it is dangerous for him to come back to Belarus.

== Biography ==
Filipenko was born in Minsk into a mixed Russian-Ukrainian-Belarusian family, studied in an arts lyceum, and got his BSc (2007) and MSc (2009) in literature in Saint-Petersburg University. Filipenko worked at the Russian independent TV channel Dozhd.

Filipenko's books were staged in a number of theatres including Russia's leading avant-garde theatre Gogol Center and classical Alexandrinsky Theatre. His books became best-sellers in Germany and the Netherlands, were recommended by Oprah book blog. During the 2022 Russian invasion of Ukraine British daily newspaper The Guardian published his widely discussed article regarding the background of the ongoing war and the Belarus, Russia and Ukraine "dysfunctional family affair".

In 2023 Ukrainian director Sasha Denysova staged Filipenko's play "Tikhari" in the Lithuanian Old Theatre of Vilnius with independent Belarusian actors, who had to leave Belarus due to political repressions.

In 2024 Maxim Didenko brought Filipenko's novel to stage in Berlin; "Cremulator" premiered with praiseful reviews.

== Political activism ==
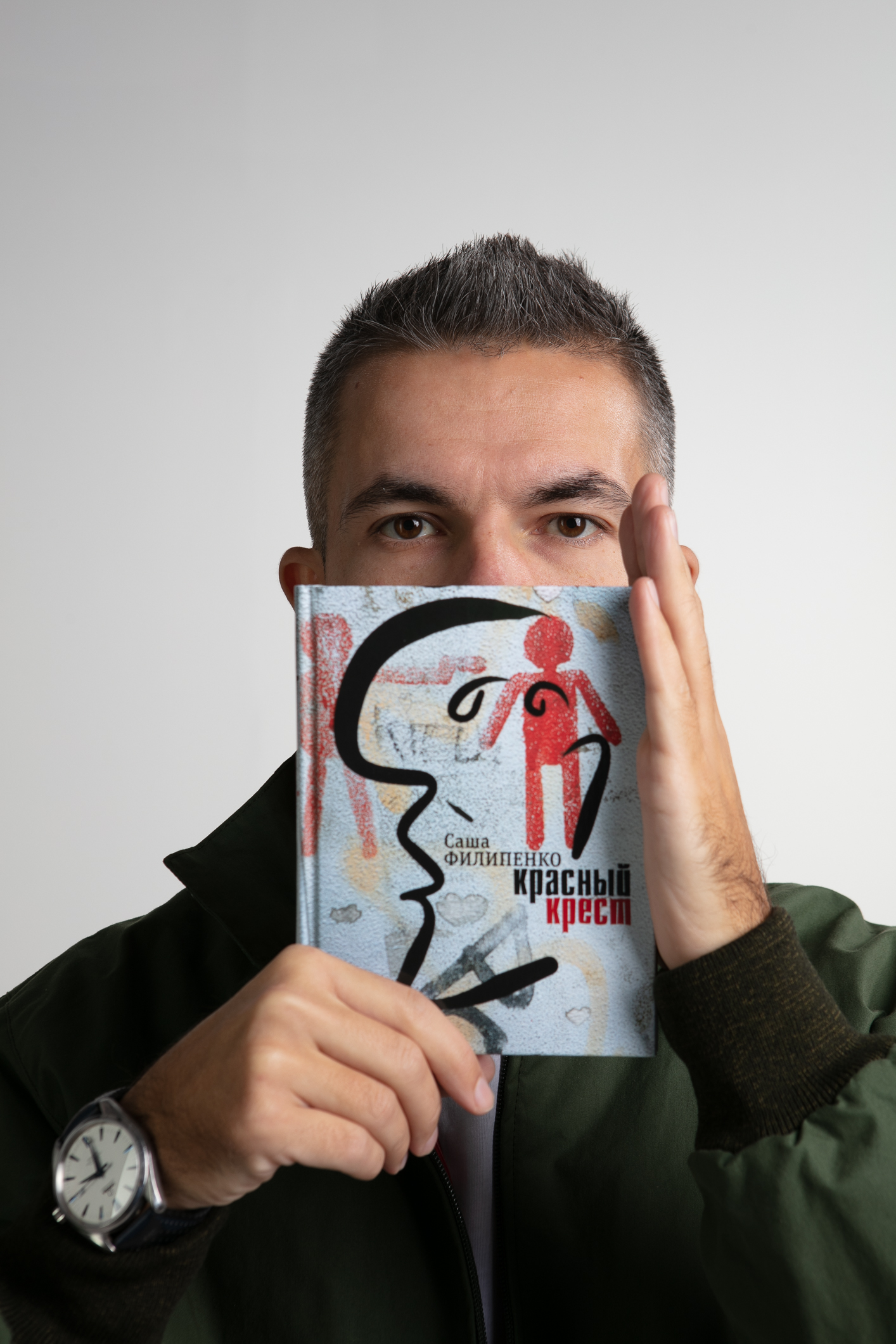
Filipenko with his book Red Crosses

During the 2020–2021 Belarusian protests, Filipenko wrote a number of articles harshly criticizing the Lukashenko regime and calling for political prisoners release in Belarusian Russian, German, British, Swedish, Dutch, Polish, and French press. In 2021 he wrote an open letter to the president of International Ice Hockey Federation René Fasel against holding an International Hockey Championship in Belarus, that was published by several European newspapers, including German Frankfurter Allgemeine Zeitung and Süddeutsche Zeitung, Swedish Aftonbladet, and Polish Gazeta Wyborcza.

Filipenko wrote an open letter to International Committee of the Red Cross's president because the organisation refused to inspect Belarusian prisons, where political prisoners were tortured after the protests.

In 2022 he spoke at the Munich Security Conference together with Belarusian opposition leader Sviatlana Tsikhanouskaya.

For openly opposing Alexander Lukashenko and supporting Maria Kalesnikava Filipenko can be prosecuted - official press (Sovetskaya Belorussiya – Belarus' Segodnya) mentions quotes of the Criminal Code (articles up to 12 years in prison) that can be applied to Filipenko.

In November 2023, the home of Sasha Filipenko's parents, who lived in Belarus, was searched. His father was sentenced to 13 days in jail for reposting an article from Zerkalo.io, which was banned by the Belarusian authorities. Filipenko described the incident as an attempt to pressure him "to stop speaking out in the European press." In February 2024, Filipenko told Novaya Gazeta Evropa that Belarusian authorities had opened a criminal case against him.

In May 2025, Belarusian authorities added Filipenko's Instagram account to the list of extremist materials. That autumn, Belarus first banned the sale of Red Crosses and Slon in Belarus, and then declared these books extremist.

== Bibliography ==
- 2013 - "Птицы лёгкого поведения" ("Птушкі лёгкіх паводзінаў")
- 2014 - Бывший сын (The Ex-son, French edition "Un fils perdu" ASIN B09SGNTDPD, German: "Der ehemalige Sohn")
- 2015 - Замыслы
- 2015 - "Петю укусила собака" for the anthology "Стоп-кадр. Ностальгия"
- 2016 - Травля (German: "Die Jagd", French "La Traque")
- 2017 - Красный крест (Red Crosses) (ASIN B08VCRMM4H English edition) (ASIN B084WW7GGR French edition)
- 2019 - Возвращение в Острог
- 2020 - "Новая волна" (literary edition of the Esquire)
- 2022 - Кремулятор
- 2025 - Слон

== Awards ==
- 2011: Diplome of the Belarusian PEN club
- 2014: Znamya magazine award
- 2016: Big Book Award - shortlist
- 2016: Snob award: Made in Russia
- 2020: Yasnaya Polyana Literary Award - Reader's Choice
- 2022: EBRD Literature Prize Red Crosses on the shortlist for translated fiction
- 2023: Transfuge French literary prize Best European Novel for Kremulator
- 2024: ProLitteris prise for being an exceptional author
