= Zmicier Zhylunovich =

Belarusian poet and writer

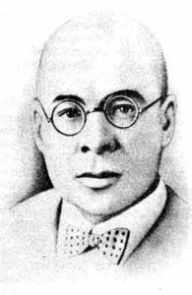
Zmicier Zhylunovich

Zmicier Chviedarovič Žyłunovič (Belarusian-lacinka: Źmicier Žyłunovič, Belarusian-Cyrillic alphabet: Зьміцер Жылуновіч, transliterated from Russian: "Dmitri Fyodorovich Zhilunovich") (October 13, 1887 – April 11, 1937) was a Belarusian poet, writer and journalist, known under pen name Tsishka Hartny (Ciška Hartny, Цішка Гартны), and a political leader.

== Life ==
In 1904, Zhylunovich joined the Belarusian Socialist Assembly and took part in organizing Belarusian workers. He contributed to the newspaper Nasha Niva and helped in its distribution.

In 1910 and 1911 he went to his hometown in Kapil and participated in the work of local organizations Russian Social Democratic Labour Party, in editions of pamphlets magazines.

Zhylunovich became a member of the Belarusian National Committee which organized the First All-Belarusian Congress. When a split occurred in the Belarusian Socialist Assembly in 1918, he became a member of the Bolshevik Party.

He was the first head of a Soviet government in Belarus, the Socialist Soviet Republic of Byelorussia.

In 1924 he published a book "Slivers on the waves".

== Arrest and death ==
In 1937, during the Great Purge in the Soviet Union, he was arrested as an "enemy of the Belarusian people" and later killed himself in prison.
