= Ihnat Kančeŭski =

Belarusian poet, philosopher and publicist

- Ігнат Канчэўскі
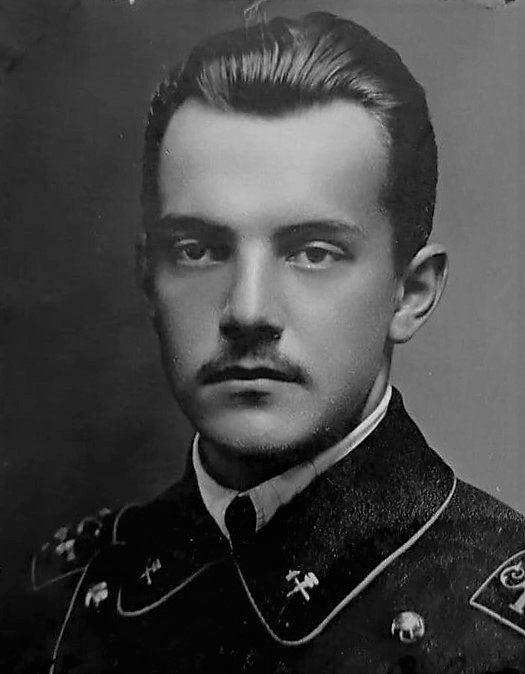
- Born: May 1896; Vilnius, Russian Empire
- Died: 23 April 1923 (aged 26); Vilnius, Lithuania
- Education: St. Petersburg Institute of Technology; Moscow University
- Occupations: poet, philosopher and publicist
- Writing career
- Pen name: Ihnat Abdziralovič
- Language: Belarusian
- Notable work: "The Eternal Way" (Belarusian: Адвечным шляхам)

Ihnat Kančeŭski (pen name: Ihnat Abdziralovič; Belarusian: Ігнат Канчэўскі (Ігнат Абдзіраловіч); May 1896 – 23 April 1923) was a Belarusian poet, philosopher and publicist who is regarded as a leading thinker within the Belarusian independence movement of the early 20th century.

== Early years ==
Kančeŭski was born into the family of a court clerk in Vilnia. In 1913 he graduated from a Vilnia school and was admitted to the St. Petersburg Institute of Technology but the following year transferred to Moscow University.

In 1916 he was conscripted into the Russian Imperial Army but after the February Revolution returned to Moscow to continue his education. After a short period of work in Soviet Russia and the newly established Belarusian Soviet Socialist Republic, Kančeŭski moved to his native Vilnia which by then had become part of the Second Polish Republic.

== Later life in Vilnia ==
Once in Vilnia, he dedicated himself to writing, publishing various poems, political articles and reviews. In 1921 his most famous work, "The Eternal Way" (Belarusian: Адвечным шляхам) is published.

In the early 1920s he contracted tuberculosis and after several years of unsuccessful treatment, died of the disease on 23 April 1923.

== “The Eternal Way” ==
The work is noted for “the originality of philosophical and cultural analysis, vivid imagery of the narrative style and a deeply personal relationship to the subject under consideration”.

The first chapter is devoted to the Belarusian identity in the West-East system with Belarus presented as "the border between East and West." Kančeŭski examines the "history of shifts of Belarusians between East and West" in which he sees the tragedy of the nation.

The second chapter is devoted to the analysis of means of organising Belarusian culture in the context of the history of Europe and the emergence and decline of cultural forms.

In the third chapter, Kančeŭski considers creativity as a cosmic force and a vital basis, and outlines the need for social creativity. He analyses then current political movements in terms of social creativity and concludes that they are inconsistent with this principle.

The final chapter is a conclusion in which Kančeŭski asserts the inevitability of the search for non-coercive forms of life in order to realise the ideal of social creativity and solve the problem of Belarusian identity.

This work was not available to the general public in Soviet Belarus until Gorbachev’s Perestroika.
