= Źmitrok Biadula =

Belarusian-Soviet poet and prose writer

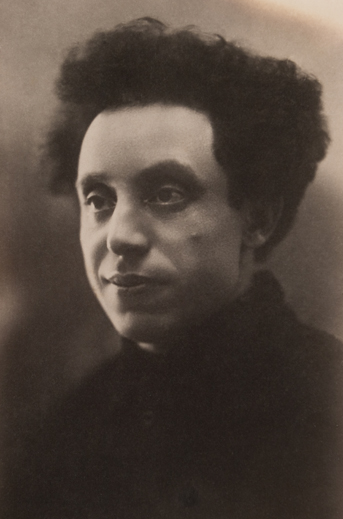
- Born: Samuil Jafimavič Płaŭnik; 23 April 1886; Pasadziec, Vilna Governorate, Russian Empire
- Died: 3 November 1941 (aged 55); Near Uralsk, Kazakh Soviet Socialist Republic, Soviet Union
- Writing career
- Pen name: Źmitrok Biadula, Yasakar
- Language: Belarusian, Yiddish, Hebrew, Russian

Samuil Jafimavič Płaŭnik (Belarusian: Самуі́л Яфі́мавіч Пла́ўнік, romanized: Samuil Jafimavič Płaŭnik; Yiddish: שמואל בן חיים פּלאַווניק; Russian: Самуи́л Ефи́мович Пла́вник; 23 April 1886 – 3 November 1941), better known by the pen name Źmitrok Biadula (Belarusian: Зьмітрок Бядуля), was a Soviet and Belarusian poet, prose writer, translator, and political activist in the Belarusian independence movement. He is considered one of the fathers of modern Belarusian literature.

== Biography ==
Zmitrok Biadula (Samuil Jafimavič Płaŭnik) was born on 23 April 1886 in the small town of Pasadziec (now in Lahoysk District, Minsk Region) to a Jewish family. He began writing Hebrew poems at age 13, based on medieval liturgical poetry. He later started writing in Russian and Belarusian, publishing works in the Saint Petersburg press and the Vilnius magazine Mołodyje Porywy. In 1910 he published poetic prose in Nasha Niva. Following the Soviet takeover of Belarus, he began writing novels in the Socialist realist genre.

After the German invasion of the USSR in 1941, Biadula fled Belarus. He lived first in Pizhma, Gorky Oblast, then, until the end of October 1941, in the village of Novye Burasy, Saratov Oblast. He died near Uralsk in Kazakhstan, where he was buried.

In February 2020, the remains of Źmitrok Biadula were exhumed and delivered to Belarus. On 3 November that year, the 79th anniversary of his death, the remains were reburied at the Eastern Cemetery in Minsk in a Christian ceremony.
