= Kuzma Chorny =

Belarusian writer

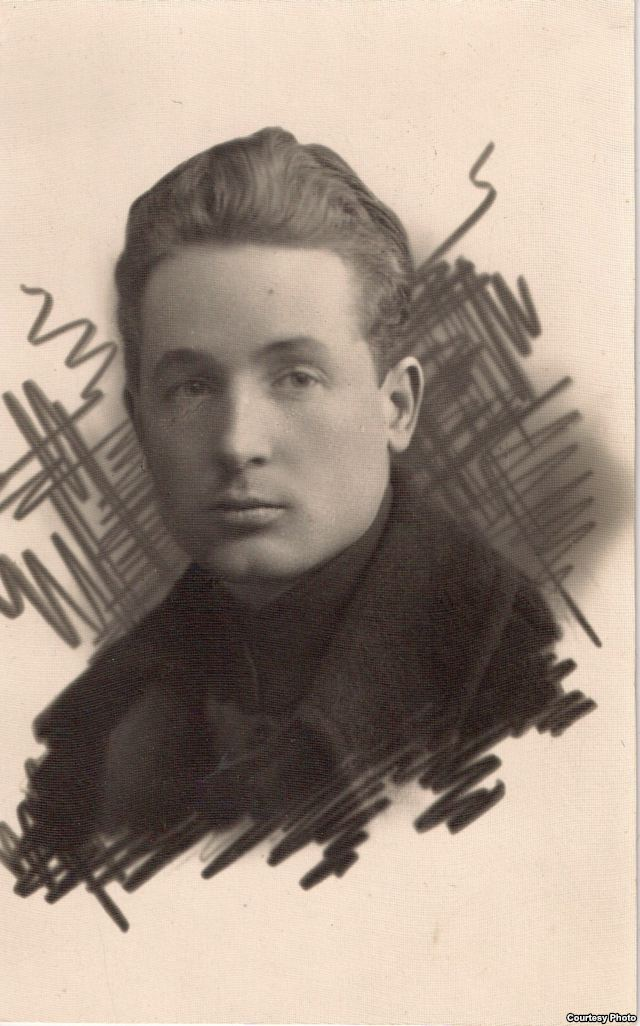
Kuźma Čorny in 1925

Mikałaj Karłavič Ramanoŭski (Belarusian:Мікалай Карлавіч Раманоўскі, Russian: Николай Карлович Романо́вский), also known by the pseudonym Kuźma Čorny (Belarusian:Кузьма Чорны, 24 June 1900 in Borki, Slutsk County, middle Belarus – 22 November 1944 in Minsk, Belarus) was a Belarusian poet, writer, dramatist, and opinion journalist.

== Biography ==
He studied at the pedagogue school in Niaśviž from 1916 until 1919.

During the 1920s, he worked as a teacher in Słuck. In 1923, he was working in the faculty of literature and linguistics (pedagogue department) in the Belarusian State University in Minsk. From 1924 to 1928, he worked as a journalist in a magazine Biełaruskaja vioska. In 1923, he was a member of a literary organisation Maładniak, and editor of Uzvyšša for five years from 1926 until 1931. During the Second World War, he lived in Moscow, working in a journal Razdavim fashistkuyu gadinu and Biełaruś. Then he moved back to Minsk.

He died on 22 November 1944, aged 44 of a stroke in the apartment-room provided by Sovnarkom. He was an author of children's literature.
