= Victor Martinovich =

Belarusian writer, journalist and art critic

- Віктар Марціновіч
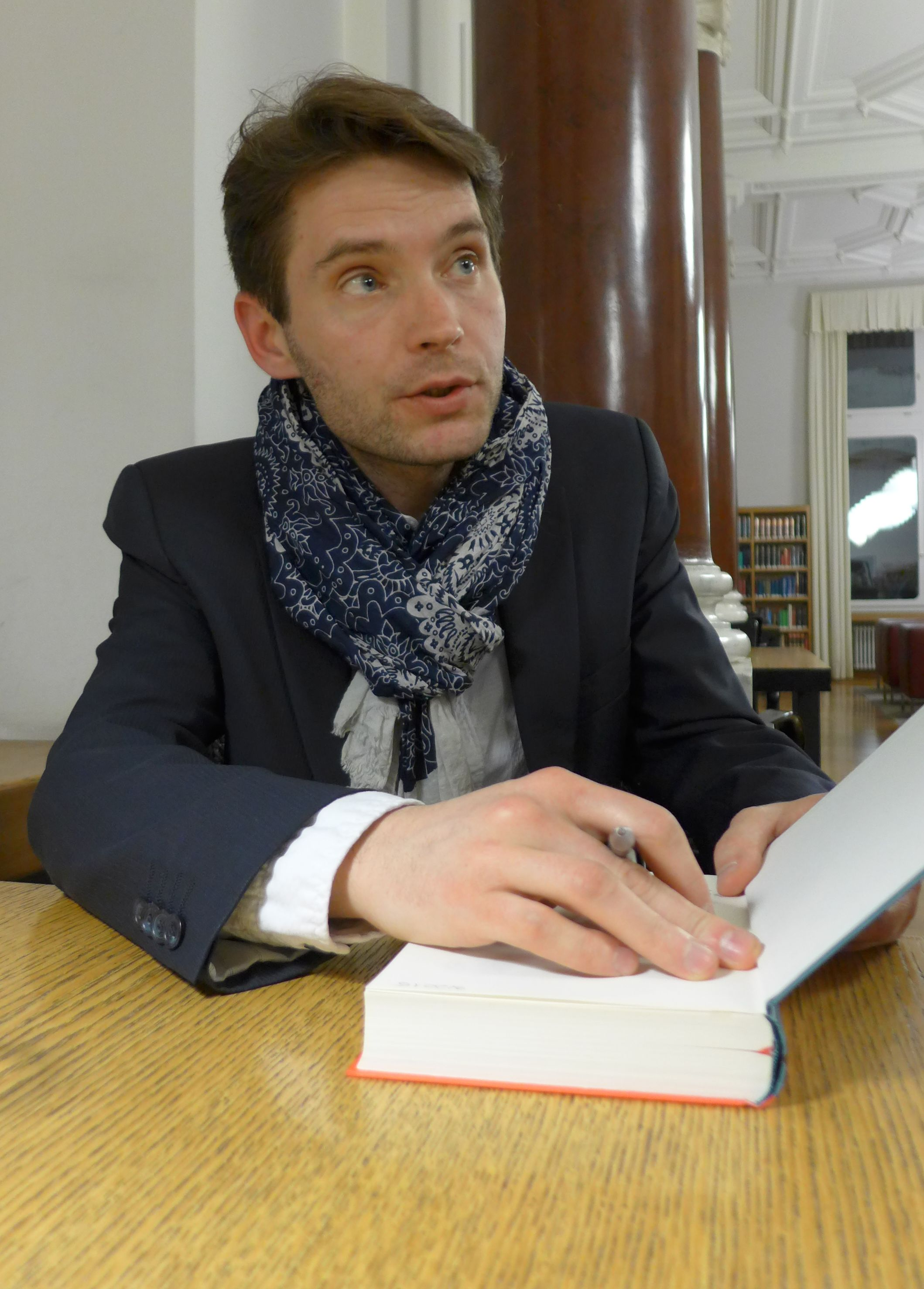
- Martinovich signing his book Paranoia, Literaturhaus Zürich, April 8, 2015
- Born: September 9, 1977 (age 49); Ashmyany, Belarus
- Education: Belarusian State University (PhD); Vilnius Academy of Arts (PhD)
- Occupations: Writer, journalist, art critic
- Writing career
- Years active: 2009-present
- Genres: Dystopia, adventure, detective
- Website: martinovich.by

Viсtor Martinovich (also Viktar Martsinovich; Belarusian: Віктар Вале́р'евіч Марціновіч, Viktar Marcinovič, Russian: Ви́ктор Вале́рьевич Мартино́вич; born September 9, 1977) is a Belarusian writer and art historian.

== Biography ==
Victor Martinovich was born in Ashmyany, Belarus. In 1999 he graduated from the Faculty of Journalism of Belarusian State University (BSU), and in 2002 he obtained a PhD from BSU with a thesis about the Vitebsk avant-garde art in Soviet newspapers of the 1920s.

From 2002 to 2015, he was a deputy editor-in-chief of the BelGazeta newspaper.

On June 27, 2008, at the Vilnius Academy of Arts (Lithuania), he defended his PhD thesis on the topic "Vitebsk avant-garde (1918-1922): socio-cultural context and art criticism".

He was an associate professor at the European Humanities University in Vilnius, Lithuania.

Martinovich is an author of 6 fiction novels, 7 plays, one non-fiction book, numerous academic articles and essays.

== Fiction novels ==
Since 2009, Martinovich has written 6 novels. The novels were written in Belarusian or Russian alternately. Most of the novels have also been translated and published in the US, Germany, Sweden, Finland, and Latvia. Martinovich's books received attention and awards from Belarusian and Russian literature societies, among others he received the Encouragement Award of the European Science Fiction Society in 2014.

=== Paranoia ===
His first fiction book, Paranoia, was published in 2009. The book was published in Russia (AST Publishing) and was banned for sale in Belarus. The text was positively reviewed in the New York Review in 2010 by Timothy Snyder. and in the New York Times in 2013 by Arkady Ostrovsky. In 2012, Paranoia was published in Finland. In 2013, North Western University Press published an English translation of Paranoia, prepared by Diane Nemec Ignashev, Professor of Slavic Literature at Carleton University. The foreword to the book was written by Timothy Snyder. In 2014, German translation of the book is published by Voland und Quist and received positive reviews in Frankfurter Allgemeine Zeitung, Tagesspiegel, and German Culture radio.

=== Cold Paradise ===
The second fiction novel by Martinovich, Cold Paradise, has been published as e-release in Belarusian language on the label Piarshak. Cold Paradise is a political thriller and literary puzzle simultaneously. It tells a story of a girl who fled from the country after a long hunt by local secret services. Narration guides the reader through the series of episodes that totally destroy the first impression of what started like a nice love story.

In 2012, Martinovich was recognized with the Debut Literary Award named after Maksim Bahdanovich in prose for his novel Cold Paradise.

=== Sphagnum ===
His third fiction book, Sphagnum, was presented to public 2013 in Belarusian (in translation of Vital Ryzhkou) and in Russian. It became a best-selling novel in the Belarusian language, leader of the charts during couple of months. Together with good sales it received positive critics inside Belarus. Agents and publishers have called this novel “Lock, Stock and Two Smoking Barrels in the Belarusian province" and put into the "gangster comedy" niche, but it is also an intellectual "anti-detective" story.

=== Mova ===
Martinovich's next novel, Mova, is a social dystopia written and released in Belarusian in 2014. It was later translated into Russian. In 2016 it was published in German in Voland und Quist in translation by Thomas Weiler. In 2018 the novel was republished by btb (Penguin Random House). The novel depicts Minsk in the year 2044 as a provincial town in the north-west of the United States of China and Russia. Family and love are considered to be out-dated concepts, spiritual needs are fulfilled by consuming and advertising. Despite draconian punishments a particular drug somehow and repeatedly manages to get into the country: mova ("mova" means a language in Belarusian). Anyone who reads a note in mova hardly understands a word, but experiences a wonderfully euphoric high.

=== Lake of Joy ===
The novel Lake of Joy was written in Russian and published by liberal and pro-European Russian publishing house Vremia, well known for its work with a Nobel Prize laureate Svetlana Alexievich and dissident literature.

The book has been called by some critics a coming-of-age novel. It tells a story about a Belarusian girl Yasya, who wends her wondrous way between the sleeping Tsarina Agna and the lunar crater Lacus Gaudii, struggling to get out of her messed-up life and into a more human, even if not brighter, future.

In 2018 Lake of Joy was screened by the German director of Belarusian origin Alexei Paluyan. The film received numerous European awards and after the victory at L.A. Shorts was nominated for Oscar 2021. In February 2021 it was long-listed for Oscar 2021.

=== Night ===
The novel "Night" was released in 2018 in Belarusian, later published in translation edited by Elena Shubina of AST publishing house (Moscow). On the publisher's website, the novel is described as follows: "Night is both an anti-utopia, a novel-travelogue and a novel-game. The world is plunged into an endless cold night. In the free town of Grushevka, water is on a schedule, the only newspaper "Gazeta" is copied and the compass does not work. The protagonist Knizhnik is the owner of the town's only library and last dog. Taking a map of the new world and a volume of Herodotus, Knizhnik sets out to find the woman he loves, who at the time of the blackout was in Nepal..."

=== Revolution ===
Martinovich began working on the novel Revolution in the early 2010s, and the book was published in Belarus in 2020, and in the Russian publishing house Vremya in 2021.

The novel tells a story of a professor at a private Moscow university who unwillingly becomes a member of a powerful criminal organization. An unknown organization, which knows everything about him, including his financial debts, blackmails him into carrying out "small favors". Why is anyone interested in him at all? As a professor at the university he turns free-thinking minds to a perfect fit for industry and government use. Knowledge is power. And his will to power is the only rational means by which the chaos in the nation might be controlled. That is the situation as presented to him by the godfather of the organization. He feels intellectually flattered, and carries on.

In 2021, during the 2020-2021 Belarusian protests, 558 copies of his last book, Revolution, were confiscated. At the same time, Belarusian customs forbad mailing the book to any other country.

== Awarded translations ==
In 2017 German translator Thomas Weiler received an award for the Straelen Translator Prize 2017 for his translation of Paranoia. The prize was presented on June 13, 2017, at the European College of Translators in Straelen by the President of the Art Foundation Dr. Fritz Behrens.

The contest committee noted that "Thomas Weiler received the sponsorship award for the Straelen Translator Prize 2017 for his translation of Paranoia, a work by the Belarusian author Victor Martinovich that combines a love story and an anti-utopian dictatorship novel. Lyrisms, observation protocols, technical and official language, a romantically high tone, colloquial language, Nabokovian micro-observations, word games - the most diverse stylistic registers in Thomas Weiler are full of juice and power".

In 2023, Mova, translated by Māra Poliakova and published by "Prometheus", was recognized as the winner of the Latvian Literary Award (LALIGABA) in the "Best Prose Translation in Latvian" category. The contest committee awarded Māra Poliakova "for the skillful and steady work of the translator who embodied the prophetic dystopia of the Belarusian author in Latvian, convincingly showing the coding (and narcotic) effect of language".

== Art history ==
In October–December 2014, Martinovich was engaged in research work at the Institute for the Humanities in Vienna where, within the framework of the Milena Jesenská Fellowship for Journalists, he prepared a work about the Vitebsk period of Marc Chagall. In 2016 the monograph named Rodina. Marc Chagall in Vitebsk published in the publishing house of European Humanities University and in 2017 republished in the leading Russian scientific publishing house New Literary Review.

In 2024, he became a Fulbright visiting professor at Hunter College in New York City, US, where he's writing a book on art history.

== Film adaptations ==
In 2018 Vozera radasti, based on the novel Lake of Joy, was filmed by the German director of Belarusian origin Alexei Paluyan. The film received numerous European awards and after the victory at L.A. Shorts was nominated for Oscar 2021; in February 2021 it was longlisted for Oscar.

== Drama ==
In 2014 Martinovich started a collaboration with Vienna-based theater Ganymed. In 2015 his mini play The best place on Earth was staged by Ganymed in Kunsthistorisches Museum inVienna as part of Ganymed Dreaming project. Mini play was dedicated to Samuel van Hoogstraten's painting Old Man in a Window.

In 2016 composed a play The Armor of God performed by Ganymed in an armory of Schloss Ambras (Innsbruk). Play was dedicated to the revolution in Ukraine.

In 2017 Martinovich debuted as a playwright in Belarus with a drama Dr. Raus' Fortune dedicated to a pioneering Slavic publisher Francysk Skaryna. The play premiered at the Theater of national drama and ran successfully until 2021 until it was canceled for censorship reasons.

In 2021 Martinovich composed a mini play Child with a Child dedicated to the painting Madonna with child by Giulio Cesare Procaccini, performed by Ganymed project in Saint Petersburg's Hermitage Museum in the framework of the international theater project Ermitage Flora.

In 2022 Revolution, the play based on the novel of the same name, debuted in Deutsches Schauspielhaus, the biggest German language drama theater. The play is directed by Dušan David Pařízek. In 2023, the play based on Revolution debuted at Münchner Volkstheater. The play is directed by Philipp Arnold.

In autumn 2023 a play dedicated to Georg Kestner's Fabian debuted on the stage of Münchner Volkstheater. Martinovich was one of the playwrights who contributed to the text.

== Bibliography ==
- Революция. Москва. Время. 2021
- Рэвалюцыя (Revolution). Knihazbor, Minsk 2020, ISBN 978-985-7227-71-6
- Ночь. Москва. АСТ. Редакция Елены Шубиной. 2019
- Ноч (Night), Knihazbor, Minsk 2018, ISBN 978-985-7207-28-2
- Родина. Марк Шагал в Витебске (Homeland. Marc Chagall in Vitebsk). NLO, Moscow 2017, ISBN 978-5-4448-0563-3
- Озеро радости. Москва. Время. 2016
- Возера радасці (Lake of Happiness). Knihazbor, Minsk 2016, ISBN 978-985-7144-51-8
- Мова 墨瓦 (Mova). Knihazbor, Minsk 2014, ISBN 978-985-7089-80-2
- Cфагнум (Sphagnum). Knihazbor, Minsk 2013, ISBN 978-985-7057-63-4
- Сцюдзёны вырай (Сold paradise). Piarshak, Minsk 2011
- Паранойя (Paranoia). AST, Moscow 2009, ISBN 978-5-17-062385-3
- Belarus in Autoethnographic Narratives: The Art of Mercy Against Oblivion (1 ed.). S.l.: Routledge. 17 July 2025. ISBN 978-1-003-64010-3.

== Translations ==
- Paranoia. Northwestern University Press. 2013. Translated by Diane Nemec Ignashev. (in English)
- Paranoia. Like. 2013. Translated by Anna Taitto. (In Finnish)
- Paranoia. Voland & Quist. Translated by Thomas Weiler. (in German)
- Mova. Voland & Quist. 2016. Translated by Thomas Weiler. (in German)
- Paranoia. btb Verlag. 2017. Translated by Thomas Weiler. (in German)
- Mova. btb Verlag. 2019. Translated by Thomas Weiler. (in German)
- Revolution. Verlag Voland & Quist. 2021. Translated by Thomas Weiler. (in German)
- Nacht. Europa Verlag. Translated by Franziska Zwerg. 2023 (in German)
- Paranoia. Ersatz. Translated by Ann Wikström. 2023. (in Swedish)
- Mova 墨瓦. Prometejs. Translated by Māra Poliakova. 2023 (in Latvian)
