= Petro Glebka =

Belarusian poet and playwright

- Пятро Глебка
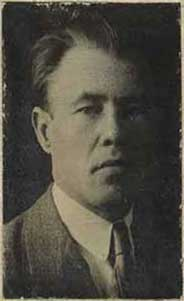
- Glebka in 1934
- Born: 6 July 1905; Uzda District, Minsk Governorate
- Died: 18 December 1965 (aged 60); Minsk
- Citizenship: Soviet Union
- Education: Belarusian State University
- Occupations: Poet, playwright, children's writer, politician, diplomat, academic
- Writing career
- Language: Belarusian

Petro Glebka (Belarusian: Пятро Глебка; 6 July 1905 – 18 December 1969) was a Belarusian Soviet poet, playwright, translator, academic and public figure.

== Biography ==
Glebka was born into a peasant family. He studied at the Belarusian Pedagogical College and graduated from the Literary and Linguistic Department of the Belarusian State University in 1930.

In 1925 Glebka joined the ranks of Molodnyak, and in the same year his first poems appeared in the newspapers Belorusskoe Selo, Radyanskaya Belarus, and the magazines Robitnitsa i Selyanka and Belorusskiy Pioneer. He began as a typical young man – with a "steel" faith in the "golden morning" of the country. With the transition of Glebka in 1926 his creative style was changing in the literary and artistic association "Uzvyshsha". He became more restrained, reflective and thoughtful, psychologically profound. In 1927 Glebka was transferred to the literary and linguistic department of the Belarusian State University, where the atmosphere as a whole contributed to intellectual growth and artistic creativity. The reality was seen by the young Glebka in a romantic light, and the future of Belarus – dreamy and bright.

The Belarusian tendencies of the poet sometimes acquire Yasenin intonations, about which Glebka himself admits later in his autobiography. He was the author of the poems "Courage" (dedicated to the memory of Lenin), "In those days" (about the October Revolution of 1917). The dramatic poem "Over the Birch River" (1939) is dedicated to the events of the Civil War on the territory of Belarus and the dramatic poem "Light from the East" is about stories of revolutionary achievements.

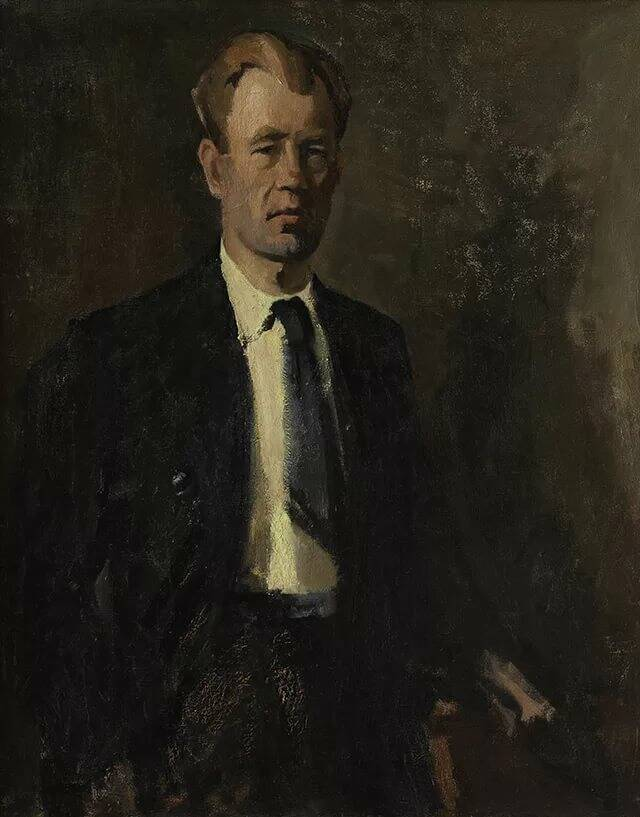
Portrait of Glebka, 1943

During the Great Patriotic War he worked un the editorial offices of the front-line newspapers such as "For Soviet Belarus", " For Free Belarus". Under the pseudonym Yazep Kasila he published satirical works in anti-fascist newspapers. From 1943 to 1945 editor of the publishing house of the Central Committee of the Communist Party of Byelorussia (b), "Sovetskaya Belorussia" and was editor in chief of the State Publishing House of the BSSR in Moscow.

From 1945 he worked at the Institute of Literature, Language and Art of the Academy of Sciences of the Byelorussian SSR and headed the group on the compilation of the "Russian-Belarusian Dictionary". From 1952 to 1956 he was in charge of the lexicography sector, since 1957 and director of the Institute of Linguistics. From 1957 to 1969, Glebka headed the Institute of Art History, Ethnography and Folklore of the Academy of Sciences of the Byelorussian SSR. From 1966 to 1969 he was Academician and Secretary of the Department of Social Sciences of the Academy of Sciences of the Byelorussian SSR.

Glebka was elected deputy of the Supreme Soviet of the Byelorussian SSR from 1955 to 1967 and Participated in the sessions of the United Nations General Assembly in 1955, 1956, 1957 and 1964.

== Works ==
=== Collections of poetry ===
- «Шыпшына» (1927)
- «Урачыстыя дні» (1930)
- «Хада падзей» (1932)
- «Чатыры вятры» (1935)
- «Мужнасць» (1938)
- «Пад небам бацькаўшчыны» (1947)
- «Нашай славы зара» (1947)
- «Размова аб шчасці» (1948)
- «Вершы» (1975)
- «На спатканні дарог» (1990)
- «Выбраныя творы» (1952)
- «Збор твораў» ў 2 тамах (1958)
- «Збор твораў» у 3 тамах (1969–1971)
- «Збор твораў» у 4 тамах (1984–1986)

=== Children's poetry ===
- Пад сцягам перамог» (1952)
- «Прывітанне Радзіме» (1961)
- «Вобразы роднай краіны» (1964)
- «Наш сцяг» (1972)
- «Наш лес» (1973)
- «Шчаслівы май» (1985)

=== Dramatic works ===
- драматычная паэма «Над Бярозай-ракой» (1940, пастаўлена ў 1940)
- лібрэта оперы «Андрэй Касценя» («Лясное водгулле») (1947, пастаўлена ў 1970)
- вершаваная драма «Святло з Усходу» (1957, пастаўлена ў 1957)

=== Criticism and journalism ===
- кніга нарысаў «Ураджай» (з П. Броўкам) (1933, саўмесна з П. Броўкам)
- зборнік артыкулаў «Паэзія барацьбы і перамогі» (1973)
- «Пытанні гісторыі, філалогіі і мастацтва» (1975)

== Awards ==
- Order of Lenin (1965)
- Two Orders of the Red Banner of Labor (1955)
- Order of the Red Star (1943)
- Order of the Badge of Honor (1939)

== Bibliography ==
- Вакол Пятра Глебкі / уклад., прадм., камент. Ганна Севярынец. — Мн .: Лімарыус, 2019. — 390 с. — (Беларуская мемуарная бібліятэка). — 300 экз. — ISBN 978-98-6968-72-6.
- Барадулін Р. І. Акадэмік / Р. І. Барадулін // Аратай, які пасвіць аблокі / Р. І. Барадулін. — Мн., 1995. С. 165—167.
- Глебка Петр Федорович // Национальная академия наук Беларуси: персональный состав. 3-е изд., доп. и перераб. — Мн., 2003. С. 45-46.
- Глебка Пятро // Бел. энцыкл. : у 18 т. Мн., 1997. Т. 5. С. 293.
- Глебка Пятро // Энцыкл. гісторыі Беларусі : у 6 т. Мн., 1996. Т. 3. С. 44.
- Глебка Пятро // Беларускія пісьменнікі : біябібліягр. слоўн. : у 6 т. Мн., 1993. Т. 2. С. 210—224.
- Ліс А. С. Пятро Глебка, 1905–1969 / Ліс А. С. // Гісторыя беларускай літаратуры XX стагоддзя: у 4 т. Мн.:, 2003. Т.4, кн.2. С. 224—247.
- Максімовіч В. А. «… І сябе асудзіў на пакуты»: творчасць П.Глебкі 20-30-х гг. / Валеры Максімовіч // Шыпшынавы край / Валеры Максімовіч. — Мн.:, 2002. С. 32-45.
- Пятро Глебка // Беларускія пісьменнікі (1917–1990) : даведнік. Мн., 1994. С. 143—144.
- Фядосік А. С. Пятро Фёдаравіч Глебка / А. С. Фядосік // Весці АН Беларусі. Серыя гуманітарных навук. 1995. № 2. С. 124—126.
- Барсток, М. (белор.)русск. Петро Глебка // Очерк истории белорусской советской литературы. — М., 1954.
- Перкiн, Н. Пятро Глебка / Н. Перкін. Мінск : Выд-ва АН БССР, 1955. — 35 с.
- Пясняр мужнасці : Кніга пра Пятра Глебку / Пер. і апрац. тэксту А. Ліс, К. Цвірка, П. Ліпай; Рэд. М. Лужанін. — Мінск : Мастацкая літаратура, 1976. — 320 с.
- Грынчык, М. Пятро Глебка // Гiсторыя беларускай савецкай лiтаратуры, т. 2. — Miнск, 1966
