= Ivan Melezh =

Belarusian writer (1921–1976)

- Іван Паўлавіч Мележ
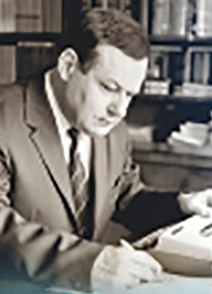
- Born: 8 February 1921; Hlinišča, Khoiniki district, Gomel Governorate, RSFSR
- Died: 9 August 1976 (aged 55); Minsk, BSSR
- Education: Belarusian State University
- Occupations: Writer, playwriter
- Writing career
- Genre: Poetry
- Notable awards: Lenin Prize, Order of the Red Banner of Labour, Order of the Red Star, Order of the Badge of Honour, People's Writer of Belarus.
- Literary movement: Socialist realism

Ivan Pavlovich Melezh (Belarusian: Іван Паўлавіч Мележ; 8 February 1921 – 9 August 1976) was a Soviet and Belarusian writer and playwright.

== Biography ==
He was born to a peasant family. In 1939, he entered the Moscow Institute of History, Philosophy and Literature, but was there for only a year before he was drafted into the Red Army and served on the front in the Odesa and Rostov-on-Don areas. He was seriously injured in 1942 and was moved to the rear following his recovery.

Initially, he lived in Buguruslan, then studied at Baku State University. He later taught Belarusian literature at the Belarusian State University in Minsk. From 1945, he was a member of the Union of Soviet Writers, serving as Secretary after 1966 and deputy chairman from 1971 to 1974. From 1967 to 1976, he was a Deputy to the Supreme Soviet.

He was designated a People's Writer of the Belarusian SSR in 1972 and was awarded numerous prizes, including the Lenin Prize for his novels People of the Marsh («Людзі на балоце») and The Storm's Breath («Подых навальніцы»).

The central place in Melezh's work is made up by the novels of the Polesia Chronicles («Палеская хроніка»): People of the Marsh, The Storm's Breath and Snowstorm in December («Завеі, снежань»). These novels portray the life in his homeland in the 1920s and 1930s: the establishment of socialism, forced collectivization, and dekulakization. Melezh attempted to depict the history of this era truthfully, within the constraints imposed by the Soviet regime.

== Novels ==
- «Мінскі напрамак» (The Minsk Line of Advance) (1952/1974)
- «Палеская хроніка» (Polesia Chronicles):
  - «Людзі на балоце» (1962)
  - «Подых навальніцы» (1966)
  - «Завеі, снежань» (1978)

== Films based on Melezh's works ==
- «Дыхание грозы» (1981, directed by Viktor Turov)
- «Люди на болоте» (1981, directed by Viktor Turov)
