= Alaiza Pashkevich =

Belarusian poet (1876–1916)

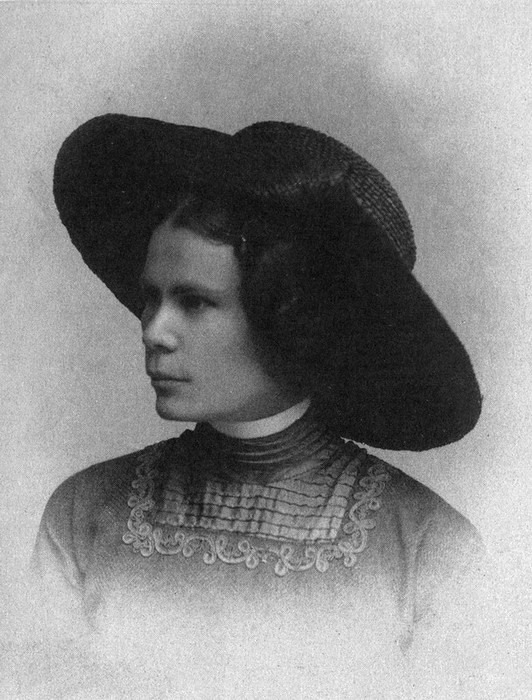

Personal details
- Born: 15 July 1876 Shchuchyn District, Vilna Governorate, Russian Empire
- Died: 5 February 1916 (aged 39) Vilna Governorate, Russian Empire

Alaiza Pashkevich (or Ciotka; Belarusian: Алаіза Пашкевіч, Ałaiza Paškievič; 15 July 1876 – 5 February 1916) was a Belarusian poet and political activist of Belarusian national-democratic rebirth.

== Life and career ==
Alaiza Pashkievich was born to a wealthy szlachta family. She graduated from Vilnius Private School V. Prozaravej. After moving to Saint Petersburg, in 1902, she graduated externally from the Gymnasium Alexandria for girls and joined a school for physical education teachers, Lieshafta AF (1902–04).

Pashkievich was one of the founders of the Belarusian Socialist Assembly. In 1904, she gave up teaching and returned to Vilnius with an awakened class, national and women's consciousness and from that moment on, "the woman question" was an important part of her ideas on social justice. She organized workers' groups, wrote and promoted anti-government proclamations, and took part in debates and political meetings. Because of her political activism, she was forced to emigrate to Galicia, which was then part of the Austro-Hungarian Empire. She lived in Lviv. Pashkievich began teaching as a free student at the Faculty of Philosophy at the University of Lviv. In 1906, she published two collections of poems, Хрэст на свабоду and Скрыпка беларуская in Zhovkva. At the same time she traveled illegally to Vilnius, where she participated in the issuance of the newspaper Nasha Dola. Its first issue included her story The bloody claws oath.

In 1908–09 she lived in Kraków and studied at the Jagiellonian University's Faculty of humanities. In 1911, she married Steponas Kairys, a Lithuanian engineer and social democracy activist. In the same year, she returned to Belarus and joined national educational activities. She performed with the Bajnicki theater in various parts of Belarus. She was also the founder and first editor of Łučynka, a Belarusian magazine for children and adolescents.

During World War I, Alaiza Pashkievich worked as a Sister of Charity in a military hospital in Vilnius. At the beginning of 1916, she traveled to her parents and helped villagers sick with typhoid. She also fell ill with typhus and died 5 February 1916.

== Famous works ==
- "Belarusian violin" (Скрыпка Беларуская)
- "To you, neighbors" (Вам, суседзі)
- "Summer" (Лета)
- "My thoughts" (Мае думкі)
- "Faith of a Belarusian" (Вера беларуса)
- "Man hasn't changed" (Мужык не зьмяніўся)
- "At the graveyard" (На магіле)
- "On the other side" (На чужой старонцы)
- "Autumn" (Восень)
- "Artist Grajka" (Артыст грайкa)
- "Cross to the freedom" (Хрэст на свабоду)
- "Sea" (Мора)
- "Good news" (Добрыя весці)
- "A rebel" (Бунтаўнік )
- "With the banner" (Пад штандарам)
- "On the New Year's Eve" (Перад Новым годам)
- "Lasy" (Лясы)
