= Francišak Bahuševič =

Belarusian writer

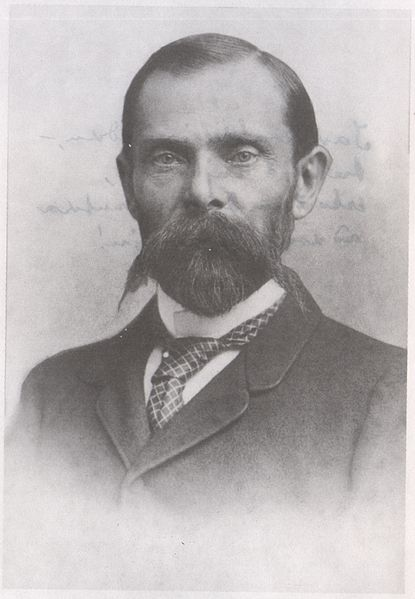
- Born: Franciszek Benedykt Bohuszewicz; 21 March 1840, Śvirany, Vilna Governorate, Russian Empire
- Died: 28 April 1900 (aged 60), Kušliany, Vilna Governorate, Russian Empire
- Resting place: Župrany near Ašmiany
- Occupations: Poet, essayist
- Writing career
- Language: Belarusian

Francišak Bahuševič (Belarusian: Франці́шак Бенеды́кт Казімі́равіч Багушэ́віч; Russian: Франци́ск-Бенеди́кт Казими́рович Богуше́вич; Polish: Franciszek Bohuszewicz; 21 March [O.S. 9 March] 1840 – 28 April [O.S. 15 April] 1900) was a Belarusian poet, writer and lawyer, considered to be one of the initiators of modern Belarusian literature.

== Origins ==
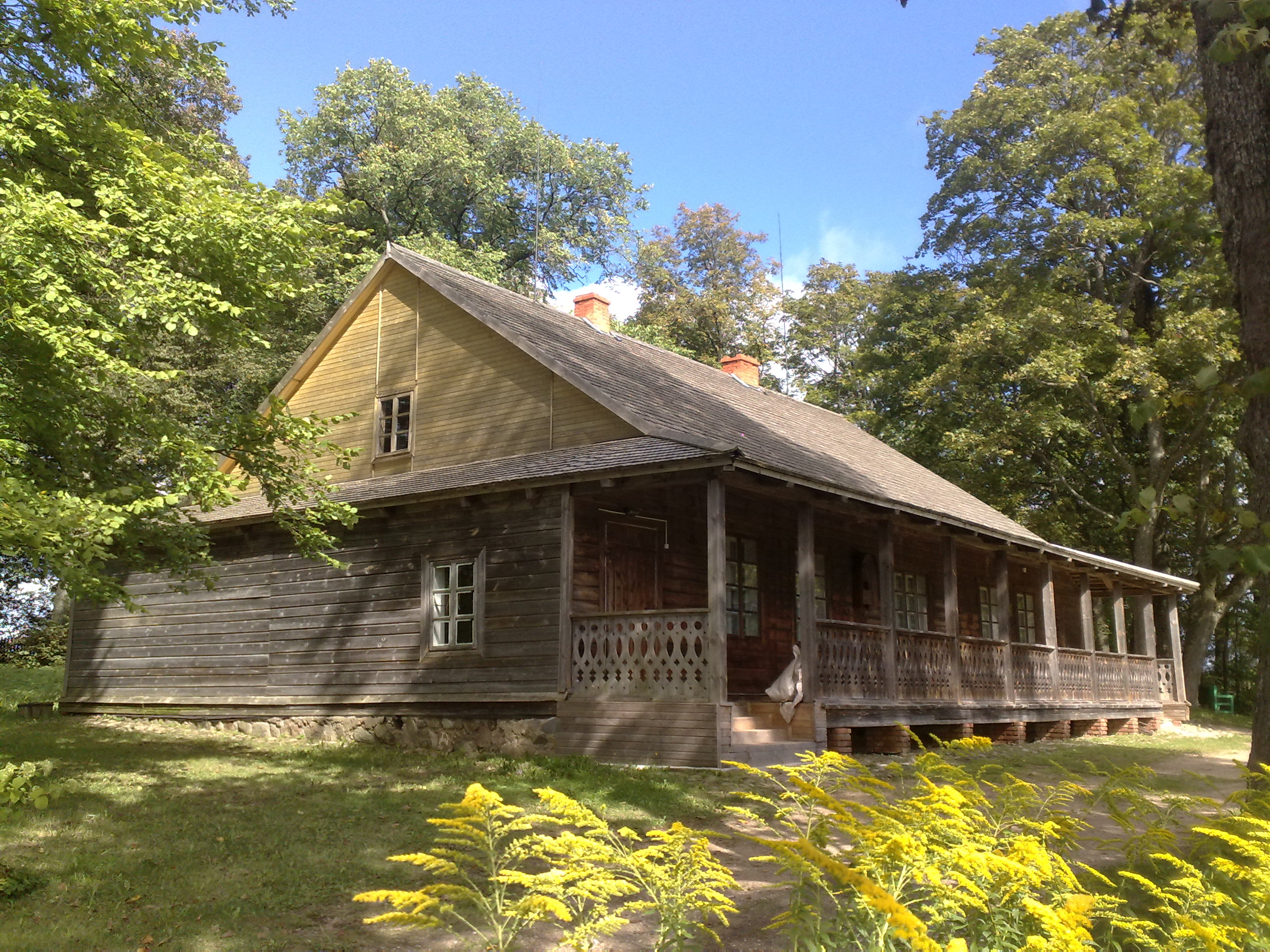
House-Museum in Kušliany

Francišak Bahuševič was born in the folwark of Świrany, near Vilnius (now Svironys, Lithuania), into a family of minor nobility — Kazimir and Konstantsiya (née Hałaŭnia) Bahuševič. For a long time, it was believed that the folwark was rented by the poet’s father. However, Świrany belonged to the Hałaŭnia family, from which his mother, Konstantsiya, came. She had gone to her parents and grandparents before the birth of her son (the first son was Uładzisłaŭ-Anton, four years older than Francišak).

Between 1841 and 1846, the family moved to the hereditary estate of Kušliany in the Ašmiany Uyezd, which had belonged to the Bahuševič family since the mid-18th century. According to a deed recorded in the Ašmiany town court books on March 13, 1749, the poet's ancestor, Anton Bahuševič, for 450 Polish zlotys, "acquired the estate of Kušliany or Mihuciany" along with the peasants from the Kuncewicz family.

== Biography ==
Bahuševič participated in the January Uprising of 1863–1864. After this, Bahuševič left Belarus to live in Ukraine, where he studied in Nezhin law school. He worked as a lawyer defending the rights of the peasantry. After amnesty for all participants of the revolt was announced, dated for an ascension on the throne of Alexander III, he moved with his family back to Vilna. There he worked in a law office and wrote clauses to the magazine Kraj in Polish. After dismissal of veins in Kushlyany (present-day Smarhon District), he died. He is buried in the village of Zhuprany in the Ashmyany District.

== Works ==
Bahuševič was an initiator of critical realism in Belarusian literature. His works are closely connected with Belarusian folklore. He wrote mainly in Belarusian. He started when he was still in Ukraine, but he took up literary activity only after returning to Vilnius. Two collections of poems and poems were published during his lifetime. They were published abroad: Dudka białaruskaja (English: Belarusian fife) (1891, Kraków, then Austrian Empire, after the Third Partition of Poland) and Smyk białaruski (English: Belarusian fiddlestick) (1896, Poznań, then Austrian Empire). After the fall of the January Uprising, the printing of Belarusian books was forbidden until 1905, which is why his works were published illegally and spread in manuscripts.

Bahuszewicz's poetry is called a peasant poetry. He used the literary pseudonyms Maciej Buraczok and Szymon Reŭka z pad Barysowa (Simon Reŭka from Barysaw area). Maciej Buraczok was a resident of Kuszlan, and Szymon Reŭka was from Barysaw. In this way, the pseudonyms covered the whole of Belarus. He was the first author of an all-Belarusian book of poetry and is considered the father of Belarusian realism, the creator of national romantic tendencies in Belarusian literature. He wrote the first short stories in the Belarusian literature (Tralalonaczka, published in a separate booklet in 1892), humorous folk-style short stories, Svedka ("Witness"), Palyasouszczyk (Forester), Dziadzina (here: Grandmother), published after his death in the Nasha Niva newspaper in 1907). He also published in Polish and was a correspondent of the Polish magazine Kraj. His letters to his friends, Eliza Orzeszkowa and Jan Karłowicz, have been preserved.

== Gallery ==
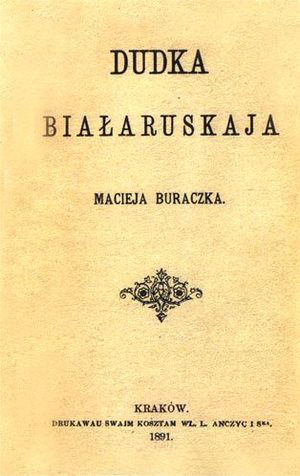
Cover of the Dudka biełaruskaja, Bahuševič's first poetry book

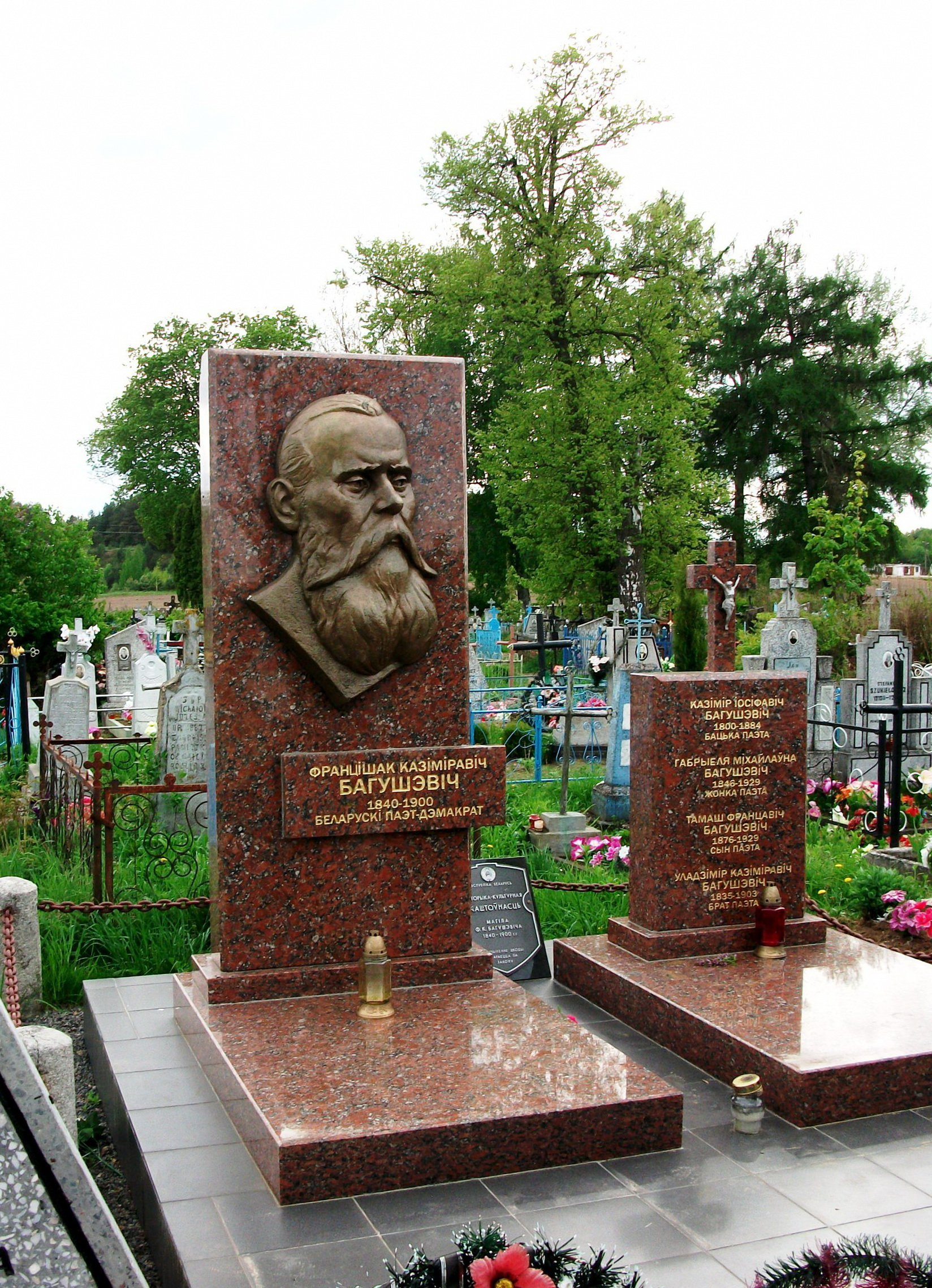
Grave of Bahuševič

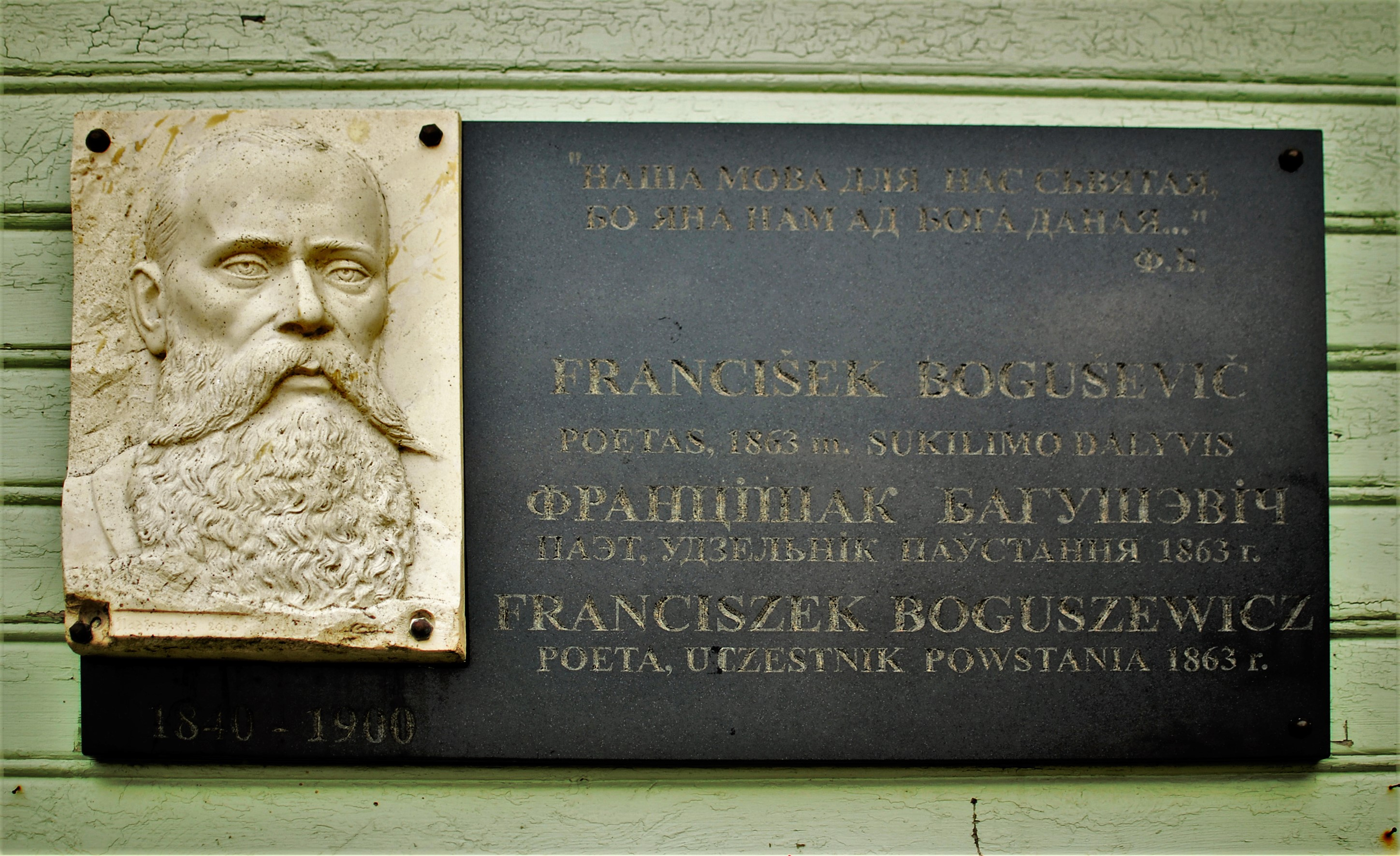
Memorial plaque of on a library in Savičiūnai, Vilnius district, Lithuania

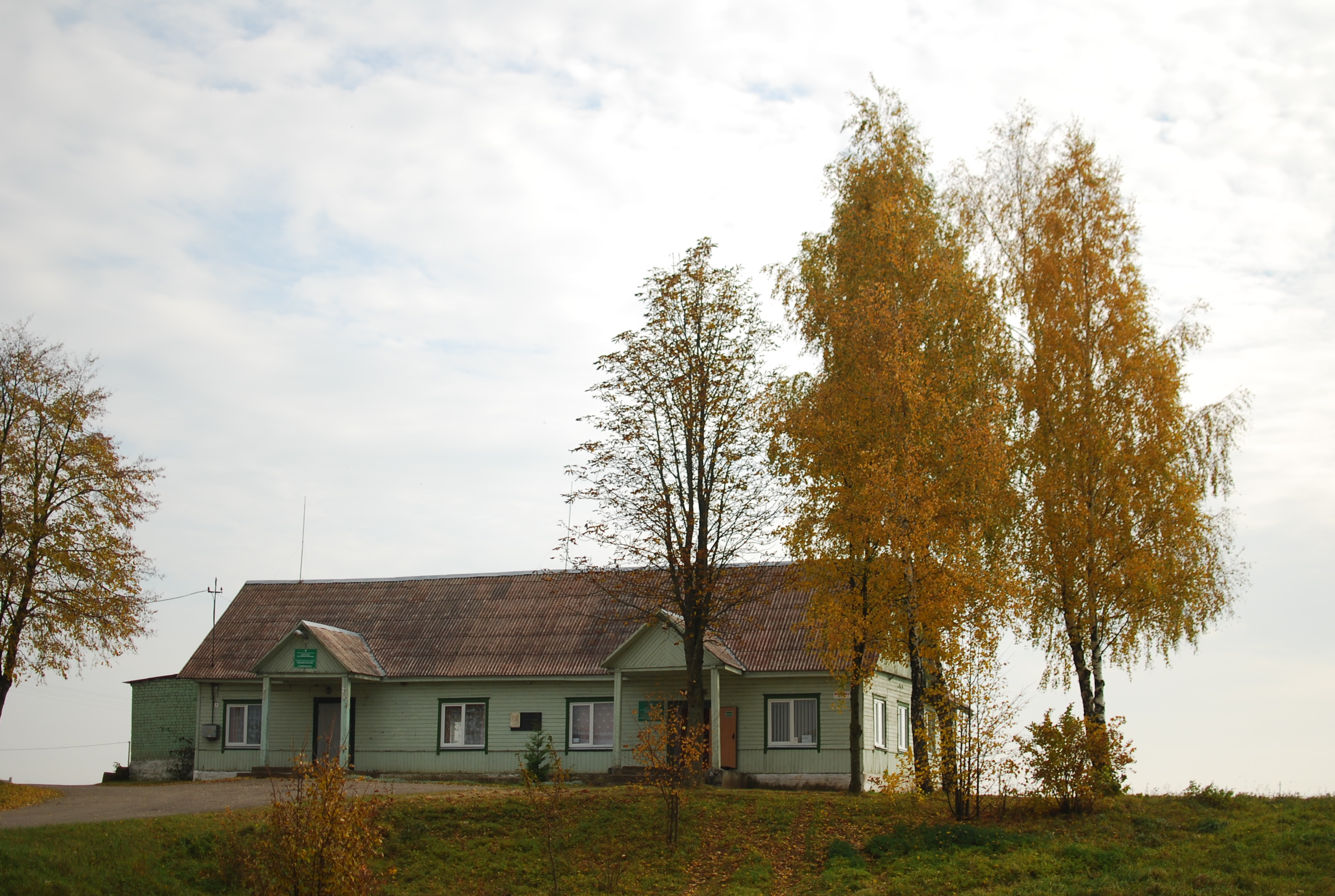
Francišak Bahuševič library and culture center of Savičiūnai
