= Ivan Shamiakin =

Soviet Belarusian writer

Ivan Shamiakin Іван Шамякін
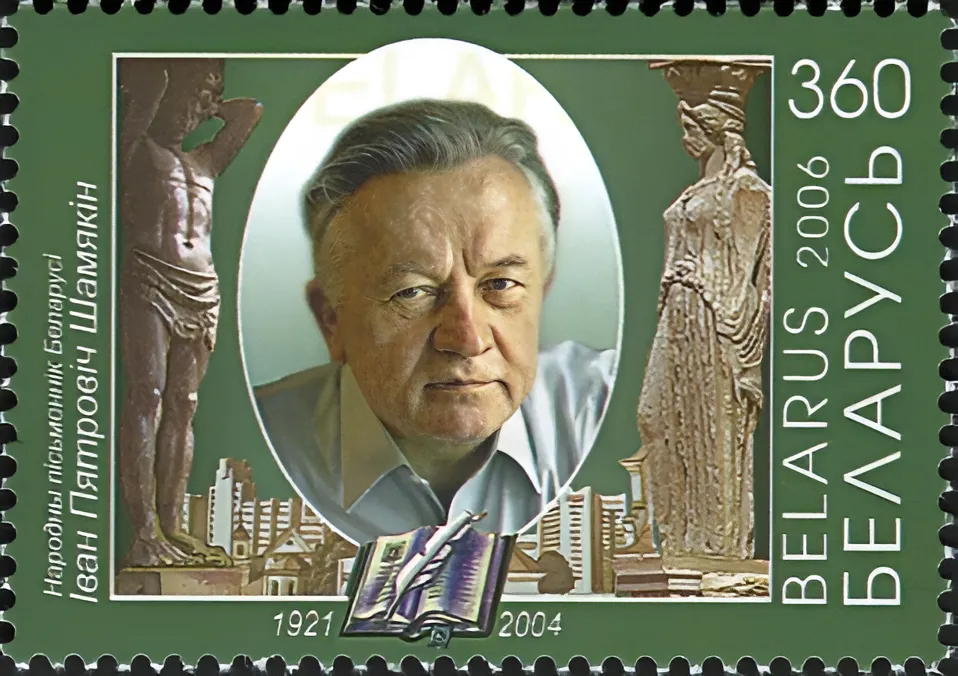
- Ivan Shamiakin on a 2006 Belarusian stamp
- Born: 30 January 1921; Karma, Gomel Governorate, Russian SFSR (now Belarus)
- Died: 14 October 2004 (aged 83); Minsk, Belarus
- Occupation: writer

Ivan Shamiakin (Belarusian: Іван Пятровіч Шамякін, 30 January 1921 – 14 October 2004) was a Soviet Belarusian writer, perhaps one of the most prolific of the BSSR, writing in a socialist realist style.

He was born in 1921 in the village of Karma, Gomel Region, Belarus, studied construction engineering in a vocational school in 1940, then fought in World War II, taking part in battles near Murmansk and in Poland. After the war he studied at the Homel Pedagogical University, worked as an editor and had different Communist Party positions in the local party offices in Belarus. In 1958 Shamiakin, along with some other Belarusian writers, took part in the anti-Boris Pasternak campaign. In 1991 he confessed that he had never been familiar with Pasternak and never read Doctor Zhivago, but had followed in the steps of older comrades. Shamiakin also mentioned Pasternak's "typically Jewish cowardice".

In 1963 Shamiakin worked at the United Nations as part of the Belarusian UN delegation. In 1980 he became the chief editor of the Byelorussian Soviet Encyclopedia and remained in this position until 1992. In 1994 he became the academician of the National Academy of Sciences.

== Books ==
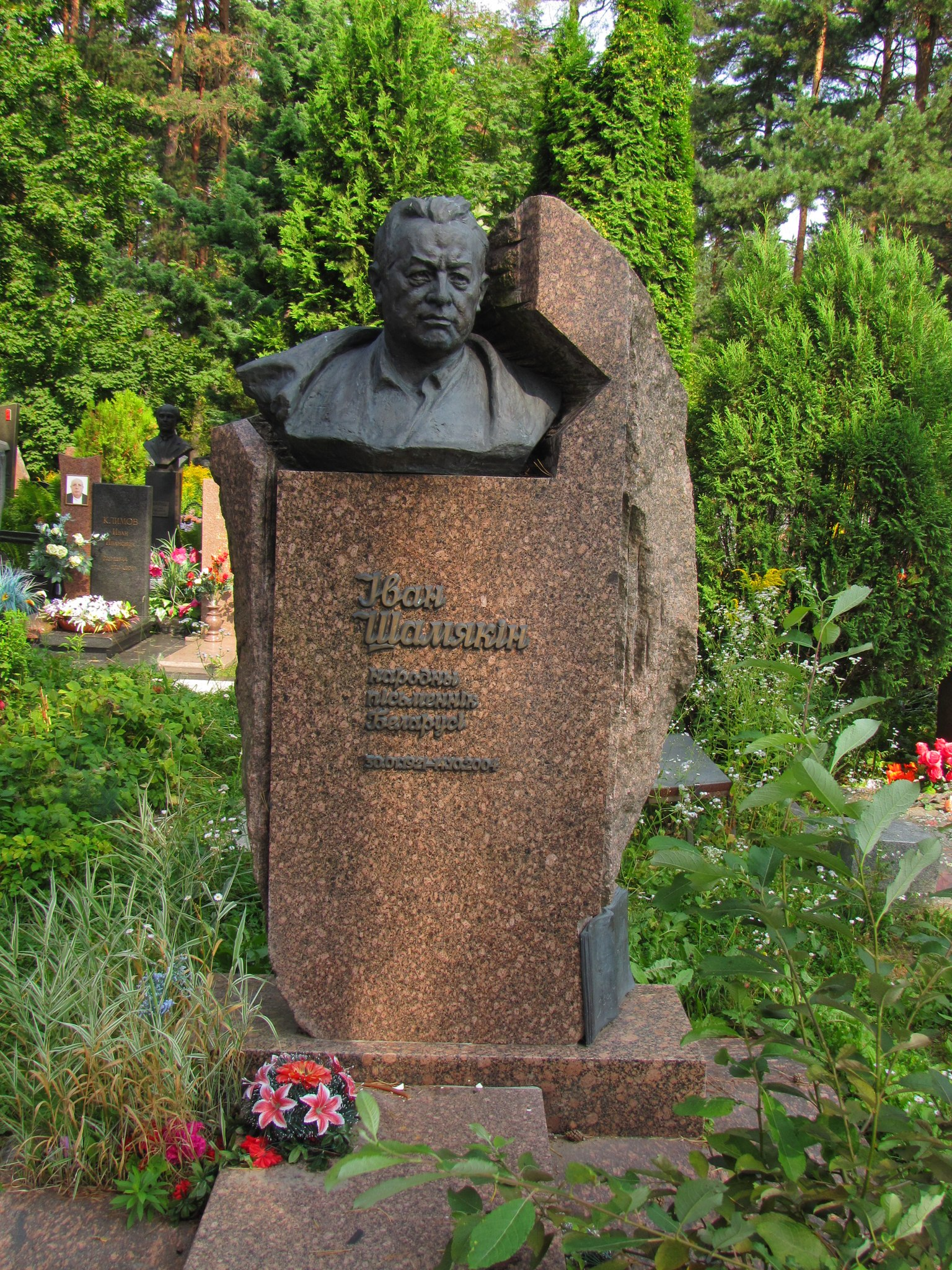
Shamiakin's grave in Minsk

=== Novels ===
- Hlybokaja Plyn (Deep streams), 1949
- U dobry chas (In the Good Times), 1953
- Niepautornaja viasna (Unrepeatable Spring), 1957 — a part of the pentalogy Tryvoznaje scascie (Restless Happiness)
- Krynicy (The Springs), 1957
- Nachnyja zarnicy (Lightnings in the Summer Night), 1958 — a part of the pentology Tryvoznaje scascie (Restless Happiness)
- Ahon i snieh (Fire and Snow), 1959 — a part of the pentology Tryvoznaje scascie (Restless Happiness)
- Poshuki i sustrechy (Searching and getting together), 1959 — a part of the Tryvoznaje scascie (Restless Happiness)
- Serca na daloni (The Heart on the Open Palm), 1964
- Most (The Bridge), 1965 — a part of the pentology Tryvoznaje scascie (Restless Happiness)
- Snieznyja zimy (Snowy winters), 1970
- Atlanty i karyjatydy (Telamones and Caryatides), 1974
- Vazmu tvoj bol (I will take your pain), 1979
- Petrahrad-Brest (Petrograd-Brest), 1983
- Zenit (Zenith), 1987
- Zlaja zorka (Wicked Star), 1993

=== Shorter novels and short stories collections ===
- Pomsta (Revenge), 1945
- Na znajomych shlachach (On the Familiar Path), 1949
- Dzvie sily (Two Forces), 1951
- Apaviadanni (Stories), 1952
- Piershaje spatkannie (The First Date), 1956
- Matchyny ruki (Mother's Hands), 1961
- Viacherni seans (Late-evening movie), 1968
- Lios majho ziemlaka (The Fate of My Fellow Countryman), 1970
- Backa i dzieci (Father and children), 1971
- Sciahi pad shtykami (Flags under bayonets), 1976
- Handlarka i paet. Shlubnaja noch. (Saleswoman and poet. Prima notte), 1976
- U rodnaj siamji (In the Native Family), 1986
- Drama (Drama), 1990
- Apoviesci Ivana Andrejevicha (Stories of Ivan Andreevich), 1993
- Dzie sciezki tyja... (Where are those paths...), 1993
- Padziennie (The Falling), 1994
- Sataninski tur (Satan's tour), 1995

=== Plays ===
- Nie viercie cishyni (Don't Believe in Silence), 1958
- Vyhnannie bludnicy (Eviction of the adulteress), 1961
- Dzieci adnaho doma (Children of one house), 1967
- I zmoukli ptushki (And the Birds Stopped Singing), 1971
- Ekzamen na vosien (Exam for the Autumn), 1973
- Batalija na luzie (The Battle on the Meadow), 1975
- Zalaty medal (The Gold Medal), 1979

=== Non-fiction ===
- Razmova z chytachom (Talking to the Reader), 1973
- Karenni i haliny (Roots and Branches), 1986
- Rozdum na aposhnim pierahonie: Dzionniki 1980–1995. (Thoughts before the last station: Diary 1980–1995), 1998
