= Hienadz Kliauko =

Soviet Belarusian poet

Hienadź Klaŭko Belarusian: Генадзь Кляўко
- Born: December 28, 1931 village Varoničy, Puchavičy District, Minsk Voblast, Republic of Belarus
- Died: August 21, 1979 (aged 47); Minsk, Republic of Belarus
- Occupations: Poet and translator
- Writing career
- Period: 1949-1979

Hienadź Klaŭko (also: Gennady Klevko, Belarusian: Гена́дзь Кляўко́, Russian: Генна́дий Клевко́) (December 28, 1931 (officially May 1, 1932) – August 21, 1979) was a Soviet Belarusian poet and translator.

== Biography ==
Hienadź Klaŭko was born on December 28, 1931, in the village of Varoničy, which is situated in Puchavičy District, Minsk Voblast, Republic of Belarus. After graduating from secondary school in 1950, he entered the Faculty of Philology of the Belarusian State University. After graduation in 1955 he started working for magazines and newspapers. From 1954 to 1963 he was the copy editor in the newspaper “Kałhasnaja praŭda”. From 1963 to 1973 he worked as a regular contributor and senior secretary in a popular Belarusian comic magazine “Vožyk”. In 1964 he became a member of the USSR Union of Writers. In 1973 Hienadź Klaŭko became the sub-editor of the Belarusian main literary magazine “Połymia” and worked there until his death in 1979.

== Creative activity ==
The first poem of Hienadź Klaŭko was published in 1949. He authored about 10 books of poetry that described homeland and discussed the main events of the time: war and life after the war. Besides, he wrote humorous poems and poems for children. Some of his poems were set to music.

Hienadź Klaŭko was also a noted translator of North Ossetian poetry into Belarusian, as well as numerous translations of poems of Polish, Ukrainian, Hungarian, and Russian poets.
