= National anthem of Belarus =

Dziaržawny himn Respubliki Bielaruś
English: State Anthem of the Republic of Belarus
- Дзяржаўны гімн Рэспублікі Беларусь
- Sheet music
- National anthem of Belarus
- Also known as: «Мы, беларусы» (English: 'We Belarusians')
- Lyrics: Michas Klimkovič and Uladzimir Karyzna, 2002
- Music: Niescier Sakałoŭski, 1944
- Adopted: 24 September 1955 (music)
- Readopted: 25 August 1991 (without words); 2 July 2002 (with current lyrics)
- Preceded by: State Anthem of the Belarusian Soviet Socialist Republic

Audio sample
- Members of the Military Band of the Belorussian Military District performing an abridged version of the then-regional anthem in 1989.: file; help

The State Anthem of the Republic of Belarus, (Note: Belarusian: Дзяржаўны гімн Рэспублікі Беларусь, romanized: Dziaržawny himn Respubliki Bielaruś, pronounced [d͡zʲarˈʐawnɨ ɣʲimn rɛˈspublʲikʲi bʲɛɫaˈrusʲ]; Russian: Государственный гимн Республики Беларусь) better known as "We Belarusians", (Note: Belarusian: Мы, беларусы, romanized: My, biełarusy [mɨ bʲɛɫaˈrusɨ]; Russian: Мы, белорусы, romanized: My, belorusy) is the national anthem of Belarus. It was originally written in the 1940s and adopted in 1955 for use in the Byelorussian Soviet Socialist Republic. The music of the Belarusian SSR anthem was composed by Niescier Sakałowski and the lyrics were written by Michas Klimkovič. After the dissolution of the Soviet Union, the music composed by Sakalowski was kept and the lyrics were discarded. New lyrics, which were written by Klimkovič and Uładzimir Karyzna, were adopted by a presidential decree issued on 2 July 2002.

== Evolution ==
=== Anthem of the Byelorussian Soviet Socialist Republic ===
"My, Biełarusy" was originally used as the anthem of the Byelorussian Soviet Socialist Republic starting from 24 February 1955. It was presented in front of a jury in 1944, but it took 11 years of modifications before it was officially adopted. When Belarus became an independent country, the national anthem was modified to drop the Communist-era lyrics. An attempt was made in 1995 to adopt Natallia Arsiennieva's poem "Mahutny Boža" as the national anthem, but the suggestion was not acted on even though it was supported by a parliamentary committee.

=== Anthem of the Republic of Belarus ===
U.S. military brass band rendition
Performed by the U.S. Navy Band

2005 official orchestral and choral version
From the Presidency of Belarus website

After independence in 1991, the country retained the anthem of the BSSR without lyrics for official use. The only legal mention of a national anthem in Belarusian law before 2002 was in the Constitution of Belarus. Section 1, Article 19 of the constitution states that "[t]he symbols of the Republic of Belarus as a sovereign state shall be its national flag, national emblem and national anthem." While the constitution only mentioned the use of the flag, national anthem, and arms as state symbols, each symbol had to be defined by law. A law specifying a national anthem was not enacted until Presidential Decree 350 took effect on 18 July 2002, the day before Independence Day. The decree's main objective was to establish lyrics for the anthem and introduce musical notation along with the new lyrics. Moreover, the decree designated when, where, and how the anthem was to be performed.

According to the newspaper Soviet Byelorussia, President Alexander Lukashenko decided on the anthem on 12 June 2002 and chose to have its first performance on Independence Day, the anniversary of the date in 1944 when Minsk was recaptured from the Wehrmacht by the Red Army. However, the first performance of the anthem actually took place on 2 July, at a concert organized by the government as part of the Belarusian independence festivities.

When Lukashenko issued his decree selecting a new national anthem, only slight changes were made to the Soviet-era song. While the references to Russia, the Communist Party of the Soviet Union and Vladimir Lenin were replaced; the overall theme of "friendship of peoples" and the original music composed by Sakałowski were preserved. The government stated that it had decided to keep Sakałowski's music in order to maintain historical continuity, and also on account of its popularity and musical quality. After the national anthem was adopted, the process of adopting national symbols was completed.

=== Reaction ===
The organization Freedom House commented on the adoption of the anthem in a report about the country, published in 2003. On page 125 of the "Country Report of Belarus", Freedom House says that President Lukashenko has "reintroduced the state symbols used by the old Byelorussian Soviet Socialist Republic. In 2002, the president approved a streamlined version of the Soviet-era anthem "My, Biełarusy", as the country's new national anthem." The report also mentioned President Lukashenko's ban of the symbols that were used since Belarus's independence in 1991, such as the Pahonia arms and the white-red-white flag, which Lukashenko claims are associated with fascism (due to pro-Nazi Belarusian Central Rada usage during World War II). In 2003, Dr. Taras Kuzio wrote in Radio Free Europe that President Lukashenko "is the quintessential Soviet Belarusian patriot who presides over a regime steeped in Soviet nostalgia." Kuzio said that the motives of Russia and Belarus in re-adopting Soviet-era symbols are part of restoring that nostalgia.

== Usage and regulations ==
The anthem must be performed in accordance with the lyrics and sheet music established by law. Each day, all national free to air radio stations and television networks across the country are required to play it twice; at 06:00 when going on air and again at 00:00 upon going off-air. The anthem can also be performed on certain occasions, such as at government meetings, before sporting events and presidential inaugurations. While the anthem is being performed, citizens are required to stand at attention and those in military or police uniform must to be in full Russian-style hand salute, if not in formation.

== National anthem proposals ==
=== "Vajacki Marš" ===
"Vajacki Marš" ('Warrior March') was the official anthem of the Belarusian Democratic Republic, a Belarusian state that was created in 1918 but lasted only 10 months, during World War I.

Since 1919, the song has been used as an anthem of Belarus by the Belarusian diaspora in Western Europe and North America, as well as in countries like Australia and Brazil. It is still considered the official anthem used by the government-in-exile of the Belarusian Democratic Republic.

=== "Mahutny Boža" ===
"Mahutny Boža" ('Almighty God'), a Christian hymn, is also actively used by those who oppose the Lukashenko regime.

=== "Pahonia" ===
The song "Pahonia", based on the poem by Maksim Bahdanovič. and set to music by Mikałaj Ščahłow-Kulikovič, has been performed a capella during the 2020 Belarusian protests and experienced a resurged popularity following the events.

=== "Małaja Biełaruś" ===
"Małaja Biełaruś" ('Young Belarus') is a poem written by Janka Kupała in the early 1900s. However, the poem was never set to a musical composition, so it could not be selected as the anthem.

=== "Žyvie Biełaruś!" ===
The anthem "Žyvie Biełaruś!" ('Long Live Belarus!'), with lyrics by Uładzimir Niaklajew and music by Vasil Rainčyk, won a 1992 non-binding contest and was occasionally used afterwards. For the 2002 contest, a revised version with the title "Krasuj, Biełaruś" ('Flourish, Belarus!') was submitted, coming first in the vote with more than 37,300 votes. However, the commission selected the later-adopted version, which came in third, claiming that it and the other two lower-placed songs, which all shared the BSSR anthem's melody, were selected by the total majority of voters (50,271 out of a total of 113,254).

== Lyrics ==
The first verse and chorus are the most commonly performed parts of the anthem played during official ceremonies.

Belarusian original
(Kirylica)

Мы, беларусы – мірныя людзі,
Сэрцам адданыя роднай зямлі,
Шчыра сябруем, сілы гартуем
Мы ў працавітай, вольнай сямьі.

Прыпеў:
Слаўся, зямлі нашай сьветлае імя,
Слаўся, народаў братэрскі саюз!
𝄆 Наша любімая маці-Радзіма,
Вечна жыві і квітней, Беларусь! 𝄇

Разам з братамі мужна вякамі
Мы баранілі родны парог,
У бітвах за волю, бітвах за долю
Свой здабывалі сьцяг перамог!

Прыпеў

Дружба народаў – сіла народаў –
Наш запаветны, сонечны шлях.
Горда ж узьвіся ў ясныя высі,
Сьцяг пераможны – радасьці сьцяг!

Прыпеў

Romanization of Belarusian
(Łacinka)

My, biełarusy – mirnyja ludzi,
Sercam addanyja rodnaj ziamli,
Ščyra siabrujem, siły hartujem
My ŭ pracavitaj, volnaj siamji.

Prypiew:
Słaŭsia, ziamli našaj śvietłaje imia,
Słaŭsia, narodaŭ braterski sajuz!
𝄆 Naša lubimaja maci-Radzima,
Viečna žyvi i kvitniej, Biełaruś! 𝄇

Razam z bratami mužna viakami
My baranili rodny paroh,
U bitvach za volu, bitvach za dolu
Svoj zdabyvali ściah pieramoh!

Prypiew

Družba narodaŭ – siła narodaŭ –
Naš zapavietny, soniečny šlach.
Horda ž uźvisia ŭ jasnyja vysi,
Ściah pieramožny – radaści ściah!

Prypiew

IPA transcription (Note: See Help:IPA/Belarusian and Belarusian phonology.)

[mɨ bʲe̞.ɫ̪ä.ˈru.s̪ɨ | ˈmʲir.n̪ɨ.jä ˈl̪ʲ.ud̻͡z̪ʲi |]
[ˈs̪e̞r.t̻͡s̪äm äd̪.ˈd̪ä.n̪ɨ.jä ˈro̞d̪.n̪äj z̪ʲäm.ˈl̪ʲi ‖]
[ˈʂʈ͡ʂɨ.rä s̪ʲä.ˈbru.je̞m | ˈs̪ʲi.ɫ̪ɨ ɣär.ˈt̪u.je̞m |]
[mɨ‿w prä.t̻͡s̪ä.ˈvʲi.t̪äj | ˈvo̞l̪ʲ.n̪äj s̪ʲäm.ˈji ‖]

[prɨ.ˈpʲe̞w]
[ˈs̪ɫ̪äw.s̪ʲä z̪ʲäm.ˈl̪ʲi ˈn̪ä.ʂäj ˈs̪ʲvʲe̞t̪.ɫ̪ä.je̞ ˈi.mʲä |]
[ˈs̪ɫ̪äw.s̪ʲä n̪ä.ˈro̞.d̪äw brä.ˈt̪e̞r.s̪kʲi s̪ä.ˈjus̪ ‖]
𝄆 [ˈn̪ä.ʂä l̪ʲu.ˈbʲi.mä.jä ˈmä.t̻͡s̪ʲi rä.ˈd̻͡z̪ʲi.mä |]
[ˈvʲe̞ʈ͡ʂ.n̪ä ʐɨ.ˈvʲi ji kvʲit̪.ˈn̪ʲe̞j bʲe̞.ɫ̪ä.ˈrus̪ʲ ‖] 𝄇

[ˈrä.z̪äm z̪‿brä.ˈt̪ä.mʲi ˈmuʐ.n̪ä vʲä.ˈkä.mʲi |]
[mɨ bä.rä.ˈn̪ʲi.l̪ʲi ˈro̞d̪.n̪ɨ pä.ˈro̞x ‖]
[ˈβ‿bʲit̪.vaɣ‿z̪ä ˈvo̞.l̪ʲu | ˈbʲit̪.vaɣ‿z̪ä ˈd̪o̞.l̪ʲu |]
[s̪vo̞j z̪d̪ä.bɨ.ˈvä.l̪ʲi s̪ʲt̻͡s̪ʲäx pe̞.rä.ˈmo̞x ‖]

[prɨ.ˈpʲe̞w]

[ˈd̪ruʐ.bä n̪ä.ˈro̞.d̪äw ˈs̪ʲi.ɫ̪ä n̪ä.ˈro̞.d̪äw |]
[n̪äʐ‿z̪ä.pä.ˈvʲe̞t̪.n̪ɨ ˈs̪o̞.n̪ʲe̞ʈ͡ʂ.n̪ɨ ʂl̪ʲäx ‖]
[ˈɣo̞r.d̪ä ʐ‿uz̪ʲ.ˈvʲi.s̪ʲä‿w ˈjäs̪.n̪ɨ.jä ˈvɨ.s̪ʲi |]
[s̪ʲt̻͡s̪ʲäx pʲe̞.rä.ˈmo̞.ʐn̪ɨ ˈrä.d̪äs̪ʲ.t̻͡s̪ʲi s̪ʲt̻͡s̪ʲäx ‖]

[prɨ.ˈpʲe̞w]

English translation

We, Belarusians, are peaceful people,
Wholeheartedly devoted to our Motherland.
We are faithful friends, growing up
Living in a hardworking and independent family.

Chorus:
Glory to the blessed name of our land,
Glory to the brotherly union of peoples!
𝄆 Our dearly beloved Motherland,
May you live long and prosper, Belarus! 𝄇

Together with our brothers, we for centuries
Courageously defended our home's threshold.
In battles for freedom, and battles for our lot
We have won our banners of victory!

Chorus

Friendship of peoples is the strength of peoples
And it is our sacred sunlit path.
Proudly we fly in the clear blue skies,
The banner of victory is the flag of sunshine!

Chorus

Russian translation (Note: Alongside Belarusian, Russian is a second state language of Belarus.)

Мы, белорусы – мирные люди,
Сердцем преданные родной земле.
Искренне дружим, силы закаляем,
Мы в трудолюбивой, свободной семье.

Припев:
Славься, земли нашей светлое имя,
Славься, народов братский союз!
𝄆 Наша любимая мать-Отчизна,
Вечно живи и цвети, Беларусь! 𝄇

Вместе с братьями храбро веками
Мы защищали родной порог,
В битвах за волю, битвах за долю
Своё добывали знамя побед!

Припев

Дружба народов – сила народов –
Наш заветный, солнечный путь.
Гордо ж возвейся в ясные выси,
Знамя победное – радости флаг!

Припев

Ukrainian translation

Ми, білоруси — мирні люди,
Віддані серцем рідній землі,
Щиро ми дружимо, сили гартуємо
Ми в працьовитій, вільній сім’ї.

Приспів:
Слався, землі нашої світле ім’я,
Слався, народів братерський союз!
𝄆 Наша люба мати-Вітчизно,
Вічно живи та квітни, Білорусь! 𝄇

Разом з братами хоробро віками
Ми боронили рідний поріг,
В битвах за волю, битвах за долю
Свій здобували стяг перемог!

Приспів

Дружба народів — сила народів —
Наш заповітний, сонячний шлях.
Гордо ж звийся у яснії висі
Стяг переможний — радості стяг!

Приспів
