= Mikola Ravienski =

Belarusian composer (1886–1953)

- Мікола Равенскі
- Born: 5 December 1886; Kaplantsy, Minsk Governorate, Russian Empire (now Belarus)
- Died: 9 March 1953 (aged 66); Leuven, Belgium
- Occupations: composer, conductor and music critic
- Notable work: Mahutny Boža (Almighty God)

Mikola Jakaŭlievič Ravienski (Belarusian: Мікола Якаўлевіч Равенскі; Russian: Николай Яковлевич Равенский; 5 December 1886 – 9 March 1953) was a Belarusian composer, conductor and music critic who authored music for the famous hymn Mahutny Boža (Almighty God).

== Early life ==
Ravienski was born on 5 December 1886 into the family of a gardener working at the Kaplancy estate in Igumensky Uyezd, Minsk Governorate of the Russian Empire (nowadays the village of Kaplancy in Byerazino District, Minsk Region, Belarus).

From the age of five he sang in a local church choir and was later invited to a church choir in Minsk where he received his primary musical education. In 1903 he was posted as a choir conductor to a Minsk monastery and then to Navahrudak where he collected over 500 folk songs.

== Later life ==
From 1919 Ravienski worked in Minsk as a choir conductor and a school teacher. At this time his first compositions appeared - songs based on poems by Maksim Bahdanovič, Kanstancyja Bujło, an introduction to the poem "Hapon" by Vincent Dunin-Marcinkievič, the song "Oh you, Neman River" based on poetry of Źmicier Žyłunovič. In 1922 a compilation of his music was published.

In 1923 he went to Moscow to continue his musical education, where he lived for seven years, graduating from the Moscow conservatory. At the same time he was a corresponding member of the Belarusian Academy of Sciences. He wrote songs based on the poetry of Uladzimir Dubouka and Yanka Kupala and also turned to music criticism writing for Uzvyšša (Belarusian: Узвышша (High Ground)), a literary journal which was published between 1927 and 1931 in Soviet Belarus.

In the 1930s Ravienski taught at the Belarusian Conservatory but in 1938 was expelled from the Union of Composers because his brother Anton was executed during Stalin's Purges of 1937–38.

All of Ravienski's manuscripts and print-outs were destroyed in a fire caused by German bombing of Minsk in 1941. From 1943 he worked in a church choir and after World War 2 emigrated to Western Europe. He ultimately settled in Leuven in Belgium where he created an ensemble of Belarusian music at the local university.

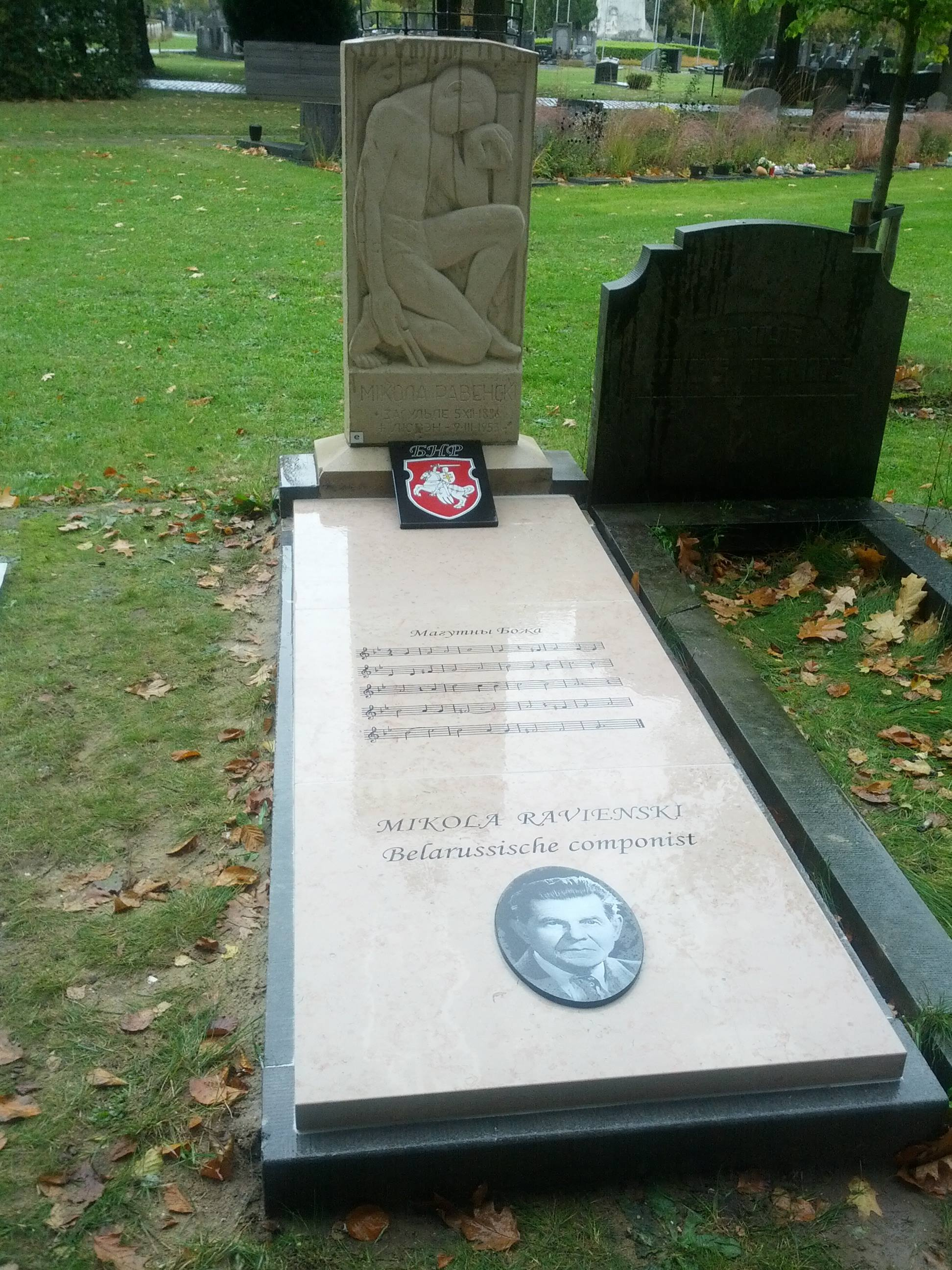
The tombstone on Mikola Ravienski's grave in Leuven (Belgium) with the notes of "Mahutny Boža" engraved

He was a member of the Rada of the Belarusian Democratic Republic in exile.

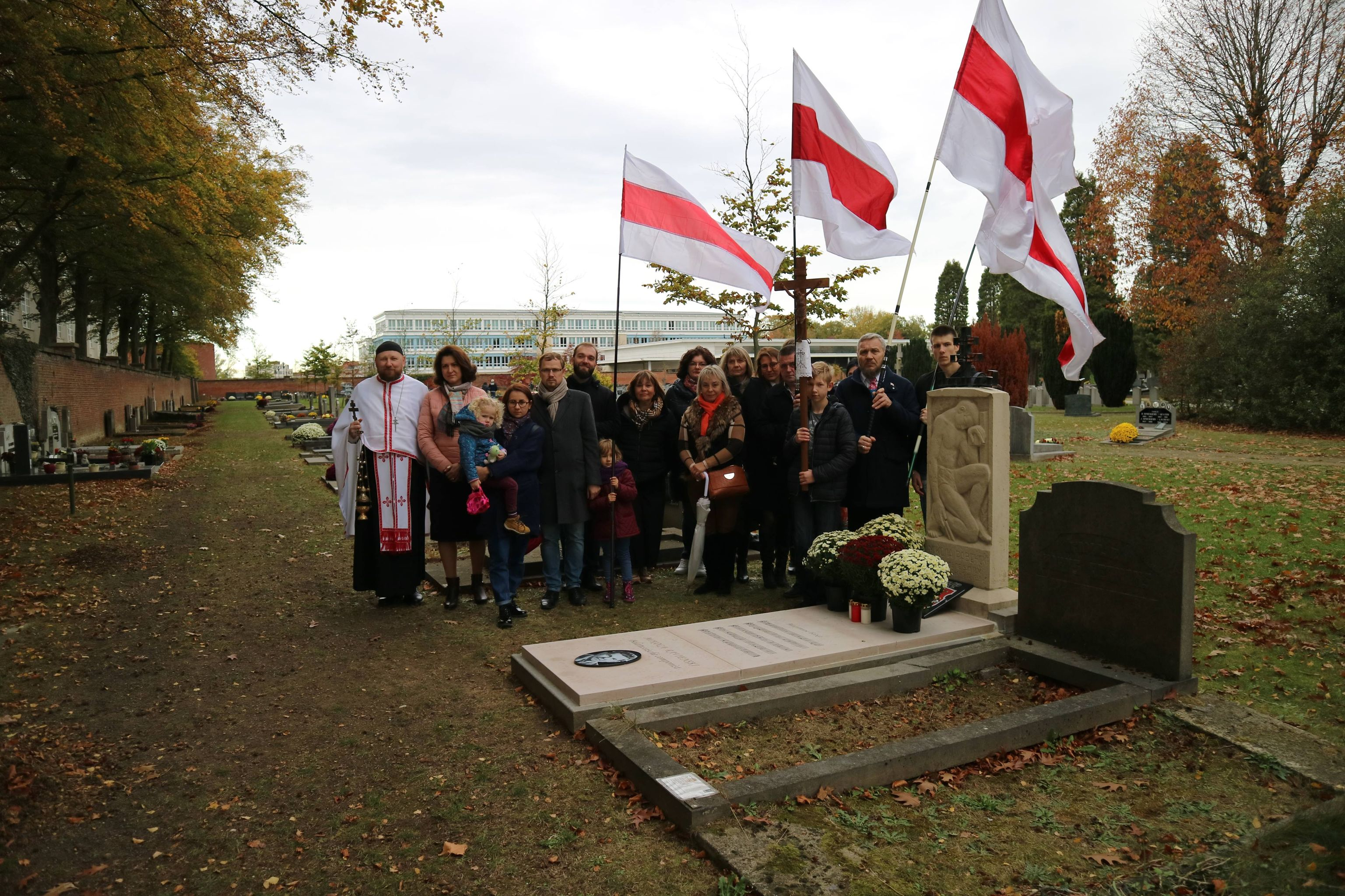
On the grave of Mikola Ravienski in Leuven

== Death and memory ==
Ravienski died on 9 March 1953 in Leuven and is buried in a local cemetery.

In November 2017, on Dziady (Grandfathers' Eve), the Belarusian community in Belgium and France installed a new tombstone on his grave. His resting place is used by the Belarusian community as a meeting place for commemorative events.

However, there is no place of his commemoration in present-day Belarus.

== Works ==
Ravienski's works include:

- adaptations of Belarusian folk songs;
- songs based on poems by Maksim Bahdanovič ("Pahonia" and “Slutsk weavers", etc.), Yanka Kupala, Yakub Kolas ("My native corner", "Our poor land", etc.), Kanstancyja Bujło ("I love our land", "Mound"), Źmicier Žyłunovič, Źmitrok Biadulia, Uladzimir Dubouka (“Oh Belarus, my Wild Rose ”);
- opera "Branislava”;
- operetta "Zalioty"(Сourtship) (based on the vaudeville with the same by Vincent Dunin-Marcinkievič);
- music on the texts of church prayers.

In 1947 he wrote music for the poem “Prayer” by Natallia Arsiennieva which became the famous hymn Mahutny Boža (Almighty God).

He was also engaged in music research producing "Characteristic features of the Belarusian folk song".
