= Nina Vatatsy =

Belarusian bibliographer and literary critic

Nina Barysaŭna Vatatsy (Belarusian: Ніна Барысаўна Ватацы; May 14, 1908 – August 3, 1997) was a Belarusian bibliographer and literary critic, known for her work as chief bibliographer at the National Library of Belarus from 1945 to 1990.

== Biography ==
Nina Vatatsy was born in 1908 in Wenden, Livland province, which is now Cēsis, Latvia. As a child, she was very weak and suffered from muscle atrophy, but she eventually regained enough strength to attend school without drawing attention to her health issues.

After moving to Minsk in 1926 and graduating from Belarusian State University in 1930, she began her career at the BSSR State Library, which would become her life's work.

She married in 1933, wedding Alexander Savchenko, a graduate student. However, her husband was deemed an "enemy of the people" and imprisoned shortly after their nuptials. In 1941, he was sent to fight on the front in World War II; he died there the following year. After her husband's death, Vatatsy never remarried and had no children.

Vatatsy's childhood health issues returned in her later years, and she also progressively lost her vision, but she continued to work and live an independent life. After retiring from her work at the national library in 1990, she died in 1997 at the age of 89.

== Career ==
Vatatsy is best known for her work as a bibliographer and literary critic. She is considered a central figure in the history of the BSSR State Library, now known as the National Library of Belarus, where she worked for more than half a century.

She first worked at the library from 1930 to 1936, followed by stints at regional libraries in Arkhangelsk, Kirawsk, and Ulyanovsk. During World War II, she ran the library at a hospital in Melekess. After returning to Minsk in 1945, she became the library's chief bibliographer, a position she held until 1990. In those early postwar years, she helped restore the library, which been ransacked and abandoned during the conflict.

From her post at the State Library, she was instrumental in developing Belarus' national literary bibliography. She compiled dozens of foundational bibliographies on Belarusian fiction, literary science, criticism, and drama, helping to define and shape the country's national literature. She also worked to compile and edit books of collected stories, and she was a member of the Union of Belarusian Writers.

Specific authors whose lives and careers she compiled bibliographies for and wrote books and articles on included Yanka Kupala, Yakub Kolas, Kuźma Čorny, Kandrat Krapiva, Mikhas Lynkov, Petro Glebka, Pavlyuk Trus, Pilip Piestrak, Ivan Shamiakin, and Pimen Panchenko. She was particularly interested in Maksim Bahdanovič, working to uncover unknown materials on his life and work, and producing several books about the poet, including Maxim's Song (1981) and Roads (1986). The Maksim Bahdanovič Literary Museum in Minsk was based primarily on her work.

Her decades of experience left Vatatsy with a near-encyclopedic memory of Belarusian literary history, and she was frequently called upon as an expert by researchers across the country. She was also one of the highest-level experts in library science in the country at the time of her retirement, and helped train aspiring librarians. In 1963 she was named an Honored Cultural Worker of the BSSR, becoming one of the first librarians to receive this honor.

== See also ==
- Belarusian literature
