= Pahonia (song) =

Belarusian patriotic song

English: The Pursuit
- Пагоня
- Lyrics: Maksim Bahdanovič, 1916
- Music: Mikalay Shchahlou-Kulikovich

Pahonia (Belarusian: Пагоня, lit. 'Pursuit') is a Belarusian patriotic song based on the eponymous poem by Maksim Bahdanovič.

== Background ==
The poem Pahonia by Maksim Bahdanovič was written in 1916 in Minsk. It was later translated into English by Vera Rich.

During the interwar period, the youth of Western Belarus (at the time part of the Second Polish Republic) sang this poem to the tune of the French Marseillaise.

The music was written by Belarusian composer and immigrant activist Mikalay Shchahlou-Kulikovich, who in the 1950s and 1960s released five musical albums in the United States which included his own compositions, covers of ethnic Belarusian songs, and songs to the works of various Belarusian poets. The song was originally meant to be sung a capella. Mikola Ravienski, Aliaksiej Turankoŭ and Vladimir Mulyavin also made covers of this song as well as other Belarusian musicians and bands. In the early 1990s, Shchahlou-Kulikovich’s version was considered as one of the options for the national anthem of the Republic of Belarus. In 2020, under the patronage of Anton Miaža a choral performance of the anthem was recorded with an orchestra accompaniment.

== Usage ==
In 2020, the anthem resurged in popularity as one of the symbols of the 2020 Belarusian protests against the Lukashenko regime, along with the white-red-white flag. The anthem was spontaneously performed in several public places: near the Belarusian State Philharmonic, in malls, in the Minsk subway, at the Minsk Kamaroŭski Market, and at the Minsk railway station.

== Lyrics ==
The poem “Pahonia” was written by Maksim Bahdanovič in the middle of WWI in 1916 in front-line wartime Minsk. It was first published in the Belarusian newspaper “Free Belarus” (“Вольная Беларусь”) on 30 November 1917.

The poem alludes to the history of the mighty medieval state, Grand Duchy of Lithuania (of which Belarus was part), its coat of arms “Pahonia” and the Gate of Dawn in Vilnius, which was the capital of that medieval state. Through the image and motif of the ancient Lithuanian Pahonia, the poet considers the contradictory present and the uncertain future of Belarus during World War I. “This is a poem-reflection, which is characterised by journalistic elements: the lyrical hero's appeals to “Pahonia”, to Belarus, the Motherland, many interrogative and exclamatory intonations.”

When it is performed as an anthem, the last stanza is usually not sung, but the last lines of the second, fourth, and sixth stanza are sung twice.

Belarusian

Толькi ў сэрцы трывожным пачую
За краiну радзiмую жах,
Успомню Вострую Браму святую
I ваякаў на грозных канях.

У белай пене праносяцца конi,
Рвуцца, мкнуцца i цяжка хрыпяць,
Старадаўняй Лiтоўскай Пагонi
Не разбiць, не спынiць, не стрымаць!

У бязмерную даль вы ляцiце,
А за вамi, прад вамi — гады.
Вы за кiм у пагоню спяшыце?
Дзе шляхi вашы йдуць i куды?

Мо яны, Беларусь, паняслiся
За тваiмi дзяцьмi наўздагон,
Што забылi цябе, адраклiся,
Прадалi i аддалi ў палон?

Бiце ў сэрцы iх — бiце мячамi,
Не давайце чужынцамi быць!
Хай пачуюць, як сэрца начамi
Аб радзiмай старонцы балiць.

Мацi родная, Мацi-Краiна!
Не ўсцiшыцца гэтакi боль.
Ты прабач, ты прымi свайго сына,
За Цябе яму ўмерцi дазволь!

Ўсё лятуць i лятуць тыя конi,
Срэбнай збруяй далёка грымяць…
Старадаўняй Лiтоўскай Пагонi
Не разбiць, не спынiць, не стрымаць.

Belarusian Łacinka

Tolki w sercy tryvožnym pačuju
Za krainu radzimuju žach,
Uspomniu Vostruju Bramu sviatuju
I vajakaw na hroznych kaniach.

U biełaj pienie pranosiacca koni,
Rvucca, mknucca i ciažka chrypiać,
Staradawniaj Litowskaj Pahoni
Nie razbić, nie spynić, nie strymać!

U biazmernuju dal vy liacicie,
A za vami, prad vami — hady.
Vy za kim u pahoniu spiašycie?
Dzie šlachi vašy jduć i kudy?

Mo jany, Biełaruś, paniaslisia
Za tvaimi dziaćmi nawzdahon,
Što zabyli ciabie, adraklisia,
Pradali i addali w pałon?

Bicie w sercy ich — bicie miačami,
Nie davajcie čužyncami być!
Chaj pačujuć, jak serca načami
Ab radzimaj staroncy balić.

Maci rodnaja, Maci-Kraina!
Nie uscišycca hetaki bol.
Ty prabač, ty prymi svajho syna,
Za Ciabie jamu wmierci dazvol!

Wsio latuć i latuć tyja koni,
Srebnaj zbrujaj daloka hrymiać…
Staradawniaj Litowskaj pahoni
Nie razbić, nie spynić, nie strymać.

Russian

Только в сердце тревожном услышу
За страну родимую ужас,
Вспомню Острую Браму святую
И воинов на грозных конях.

В белой пене проносятся кони,
Рвутся, стремятся и тяжко хрипят,
Стародавней Литовской Погони
Не разбить, не остановить, не сдержать!

В безмерную даль вы летите,
А за вами, пред вами — годы.
Вы за кем в погоню спешите?
Где пути ваши идут и куда?

Может они, Беларусь, понеслись
За твоими детьми вдогонку,
Что забыли тебя, отреклись,
Продали и отдали в плен?

Бейте в сердца их — бейте мечами,
Не давайте чужаками быть!
Пусть услышат, как сердце ночами
О родимой сторонке болит.

Мать родная, Мать-Страна!
Не утихнет такая боль.
Ты прости, ты прими своего сына,
За Тебя ему умереть позволь!

Всё летят и летят те кони,
Серебряной сбруей далеко гремят…
Стародавней Литовской Погони
Не разбить, не остановить, не сдержать.

Literal English translation

As soon as in my anxious heart I hear
Fear for my native country,
I remember the holy Gate of Dawn
And warriors on fearsome horses.

In white foam the horses race,
Darting, dashing and heavily wheezing,
Ancient Lithuanian Pahonia
Cannot be crushed, cannot be stopped, cannot be restrained!

You fly to infinite spaces,
And behind you and ahead of you are years.
Who are you pursuing?
Where is your path and where does it lead?

Maybe, Belarus, they are chasing
After your children,
Who forgot you, disowned you,
Sold you, gave you up?

Knock on their hearts – knock with swords,
Do not let them be strangers!
Let them hear how at night the heart
Is aching for motherland.

Dear mother, motherland!
This pain will not subside.
Forgive, accept your son,
Permit him to die for you!

These horses keep flying,
Their silver harness is clanging in the distance.
Ancient Lithuanian Pahonia
Cannot be crushed, cannot be stopped, cannot be restrained.

== See also ==
- Pahonia (coat of arms)
- Mahutny Boža (Almighty God)
- Freedom Day (Belarus)
- Vajacki marš
- Belarusian national revival

== Bibliography ==
- Березкин Г. С. (1970). Человек на заре : Рассказ о Максиме Богдановиче — белорусском поэте. М.: Художественная литература.
- Музыкальное видео с текстом
