= Mikhas Klimkovich =

Belarusian poet (1899–1954)

Michaś Mikałajevič Klimkovič
- Міхась Клімковіч; Михаил Климкович
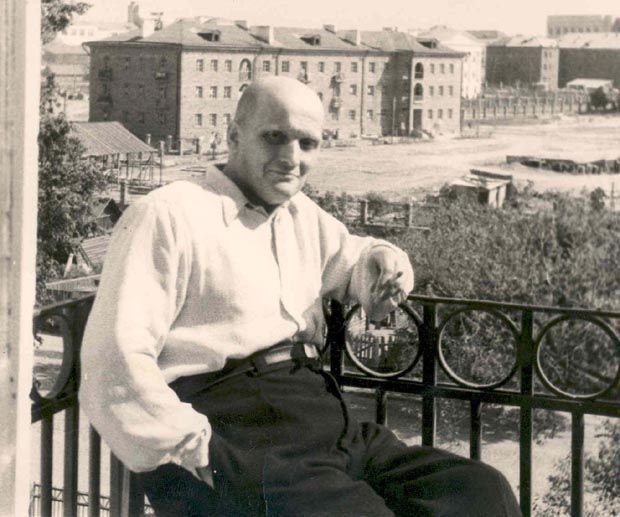
- Born: Міхаіл Мікалаевіч Клімковіч; 20 November 1899; Salitranka, Minsk Governorate, Russian Empire
- Died: 5 November 1954 (aged 54); Minsk, Byelorussian SSR
- Occupations: Writer, poet, librettist
- Writing career
- Notable works: State Anthem of the Byelorussian Soviet Socialist Republic "My Belarusy" (co-author)

Michaś Mikałajevič Klimkovič (Note: Belarusian: Міхась Мікалаевіч Клімковіч; Russian: Михаил Николаевич Климкович, romanized: Mikhail Nikolayevich Klimkovich) (20 November 1899 – 5 November 1954) was a Belarusian poet, playwright, prose writer, literary critic, librettist and author. He wrote the lyrics to the State Anthem of the Byelarusian SSR, and co-wrote the lyrics to the current State Anthem of the Republic of Belarus.

== Biography ==
Klimkovich was born on 20 November 1899 in the village of Sialitranka, Barysaw Uyezd, in the Russian Empire, into the family of a stoker. In 1915 he graduated from a four-year pedagogical institute and subsequently worked as a teacher.

Klimkovich joined the revolutionary communist forces during the collapse of the Russian Empire, fighting in the Red Army during the Russian Civil War. He became a member of the Russian Communist Party (b) in 1920. Between 1932 and 1937 he was a member of the organizinatinal committee in charge of the education activities of the Belarusian Writers' Union before being elected as the Belarusian Writers' Union's first-ever chairman in 1934. He was also a member of the Central Executive Committee of the Byelorussian SSR from 1931 to 1938. At the end of 1936, he was accused of having links to “Trotskyists and national democrats” so in 1937 he attempted suicide.

From 1943 to 1947, Klimkovich served as editor-in-chief of the State Publishing House of the Byelorussian SSR, first in Moscow and later in Minsk.

He died in Minsk on 5 November 1954 and was buried at the Military Cemetery in Minsk.

== Literary work ==
Klimkovich made his literary debut in 1928. His literary output included poetry, drama, prose, criticism, translations, and librettos.

Among his works are the poem 14 Słuck Men and the verse plays Katsiaryna Zharnasiek (1937), Adplata (1945), and Usia ŭlada Savietam (published posthumously in 1956). Katsiaryna Zharnasiek was staged at the Yanka Kupala Theatre in 1938. His dramatic trilogy Georgy Skaryna was also staged at the Yanka Kupala Theatre.

Klimkovich wrote the librettos for the operas Aposhni viechar na khutary (The Last Evening on the Farmstead), published in 1940, and Kastus Kalinouski, first staged in 1947. He also wrote the libretto for the ballet Knyaz-vozera (The Lake Prince), which was first performed in 1949.

He translated works by Russian, Ukrainian, Polish, Lithuanian, and other authors into Belarusian.

In 1946, the State Publishing House of the Byelorussian SSR published his prose collection Liasnoye voziera (The Forest Lake).

Klimkovich also published an article about Natallia Arsiennieva in the newspaper Literature and Art on 3 March 1940.

== Family ==
Klimkovich was married to Maria Yazepavna. They had two daughters, Maya and Sviatlana.
