= Uladzimir Dubouka =

Belarusian poet and writer

- Уладзімір Дубоўка
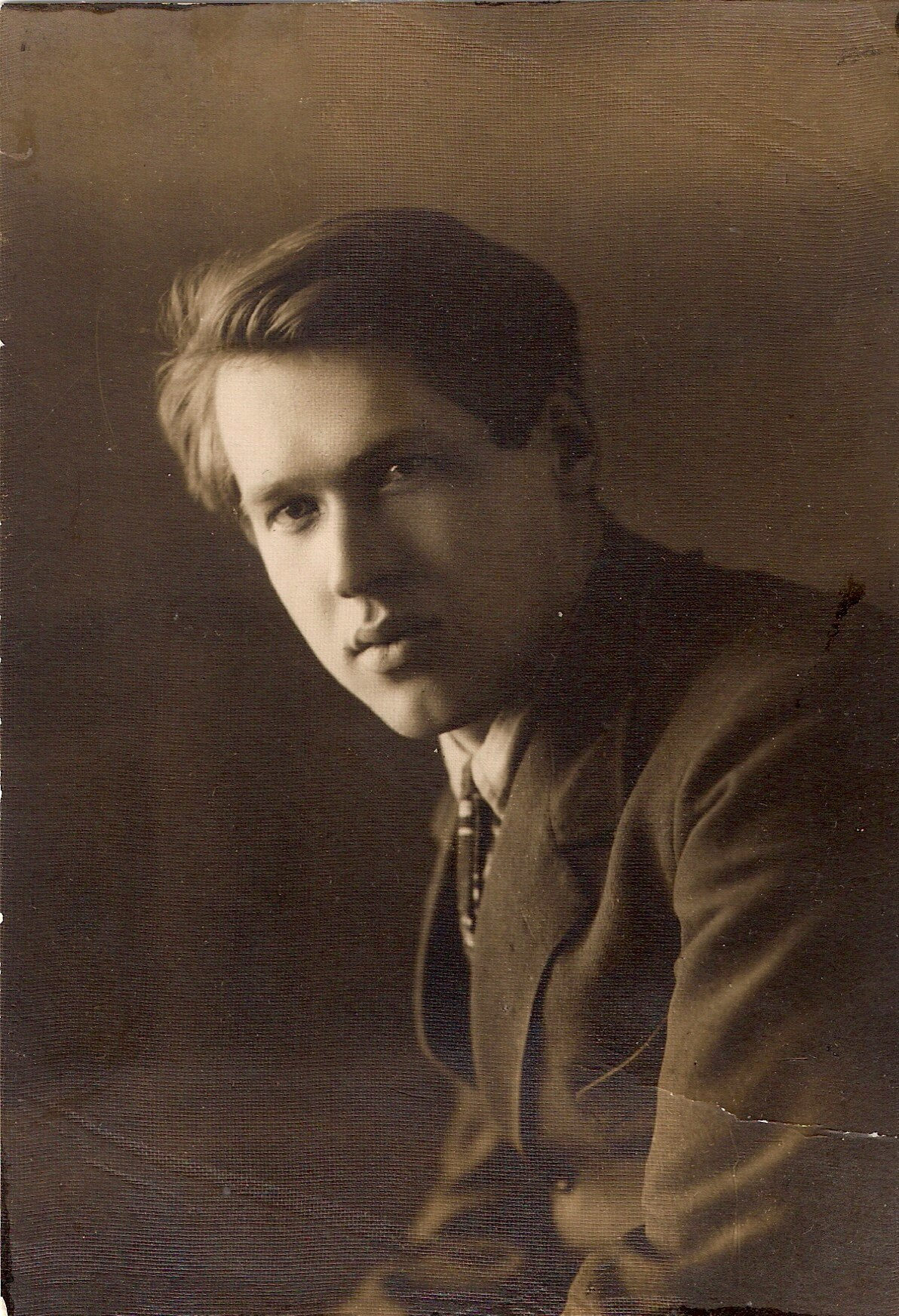
- Dubouka in 1925
- Born: 15 July 1900; Vilna Governorate, Russian Empire (now Pastavy Raion, Vitebsk Region, Belarus)
- Died: 20 March 1976 (aged 75); Moscow, Soviet Union
- Occupations: poet, prose writer, linguist, literary critic
- Awards: a literary prize for the book of poetry "Polesian Rhapsody"

Uladzimir Mikalahevič Dubouka (Belarusian: Уладзі́мір Мікала́евіч Дубо́ўка; Russian: Влади́мир Никола́евич Дубо́вка; 15 July 1900 – 20 March 1976) was a Belarusian poet, prose writer, linguist, and a literary critic.

== Early life ==
Dubouka was born on 15 July 1900 into a working family in Vilna Governorate. His grandfather was a farmer and his father a textile worker. He went to school from 1905 to 1912, then in 1912 he entered the specialized school, and in 1914 he enrolled to New Vilejka Teachers' Seminary, which was later moved to Nevel.

In 1918 he graduated and joined his family in Moscow, where they had moved in 1915. He enrolled in the MSU History and Philology Faculty, but after two months he had to abandon his studies and go to work to support his family.

In 1920 he served in a telegraph line-laying company in the Red Army. After he left the military in 1921 he worked at the People's Commissariat for Education as a school instructor and a guidance counselor.

His first poem was published in 1921 and during the 1920s Dubouka became one of the leading Belarusian poets. In 1921 Dubouka entered Valery Bryusov's Institute of Literature and Arts. The years in the institute played a significant role in the development of his talent, aesthetic perception, and literature skills.

In 1922-1925 he was chief editor of Belarusian publication 'Government Bulletin' and in the same time served as Executive Secretary of the BSSR in the Soviet Union government. In that time he got to know Vladimir Mayakovsky and Sergei Yesenin.

In 1924 he visited Minsk for the first time, then went to Kharkiv and met Ukrainian poets there. During that period he also worked as an editor of literature page at the Gudok newspaper. In 1926-1930 he edited 'The Code of Laws and Orders of the Workers-Peasant Government of the Union of Soviet Socialist Republics'.

Though living in Moscow, he actively collaborated to development of Belarusian literature. Dubouka joined several literary unions and published some his poems in the western magazine 'Belorusskaya Kultura'.

== Personal life ==
In 1927 he married Maria Petrovna Klaus. They had a son named Olgerd.

== Persecution ==
On 20 July 1930 Dubouka was arrested in Moscow by the OGPU and became a suspect during the investigation of the 'Case of the Union of Liberation of Belarus'. In April 1931 he was sentenced to deportation to Yaransk, where his wife and son later joined him. They were forcibly moved to Sheshurga, then to Cheboksary. In July 1935 his five-year sentence was increased by another two years.

In November 1937 Dubouka was arrested for the second time and sentenced to ten years in prison in Chuvashia and the Far East. In 1941 his son Olgerd died while the family was in Taldom. After release in 1947 Dubouka and his wife moved to Zugdidi, where they hoped to live in peace. The poet found a job as an accountant for the local state farm.

He was re-arrested on 16 February 1949 and sentenced to 25 years in prison. He was kept in Tbilisi prison, then moved to Krasnoyarsk Krai, where he worked as a carpenter.

== Poetry ==
Critics divide Dubouka's poetic career into two periods: between 1921—1930 and 1958—1976, where the first was more fruitful. His way as a poet officially started in 1921 when his poem 'Belarusian Sun' was published in the 'Sovetskaya Belorussiya' newspaper. In 1923 he published a book of poetry 'Stroma', then in 1925 'Where the Cypresses Stand' and 'Cane', 'Credo' in 1926 and 'Nalya' in 1927. The poem 'For all the lands, all the people' which caused him to be arrested in 1930 was published in the 'Belorusskaya Kultura' under a pen-name Yanka Krivchanin. Dubouka then never used this pseudonym again.

Dubouka was influenced by such classic Belarusian writers as Yanka Kupala, Yakub Kolas, and Maksim Bahdanovič.

After 1958 he started working as a writer and translator, translating Shakespeare and Byron into Belarusian and writing tales and stories for children. In 1973 he published a memoir titled «Пялёсткі» (Petals).

According to linguists, Dubouka significantly contributed to development of the Belarusian language. In his poems he frequently used neologisms and vernacular. He is an author of several linguistic articles regarding orthography and graphics of the Belarusian language, and believed that the Cyrillic alphabet fit it better than the Czech and Polish alphabets. He suggested introducing «ö» instead of «ё» and using «ї» like in the Ukrainian.

Maksim Harecki and Volodymyr Sosiura named Dubouka the greatest poet of the post-revolution Belarus.

== Exoneration and recognition ==
Dubouka was exonerated during the Khrushchev Thaw in November 1957.

In 1958 he became a member of the Belarusian Union of Writers in 1958 and in 1962 a literary prize winner for the book of poetry "Polesian Rhapsody".
