= Maksim Bahdanovich Literary Museum =

Museum in Minsk, Belarus

Coordinates: 53.9081°N 27.5560°E

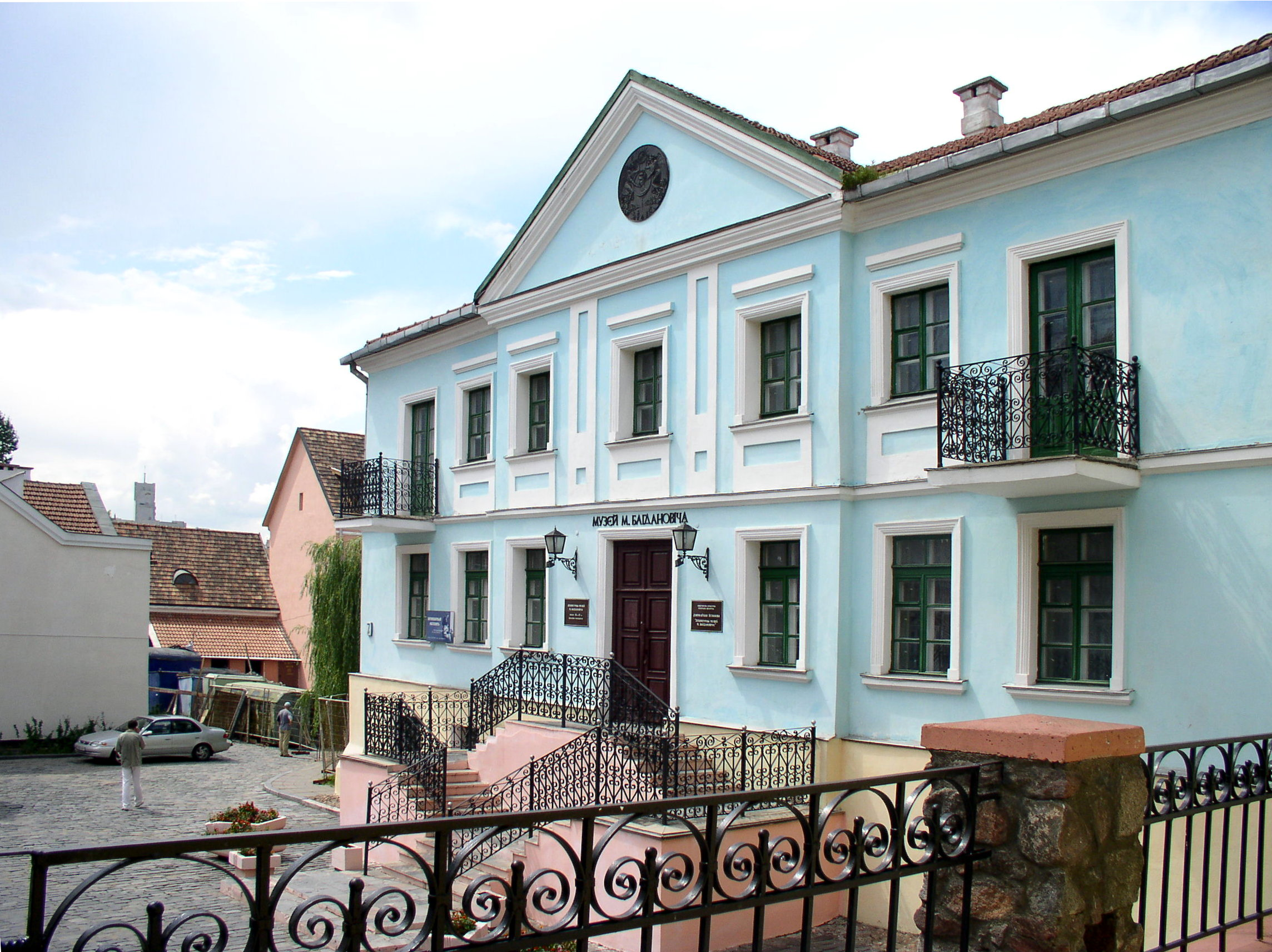
Maksim Bahdanovich Literary Museum.

Maksim Bahdanovich Literary Museum (Belarusian: Літаратурны музей Максіма Багдановіча, romanized: Litaraturny muziej Maksima Bahdanoviča) is a museum in Minsk, Belarus. It is dedicated to the writer Maksim Bahdanovich (1891–1917). The work of the bibliographer Nina Vatatsy was central to the museum's foundation.

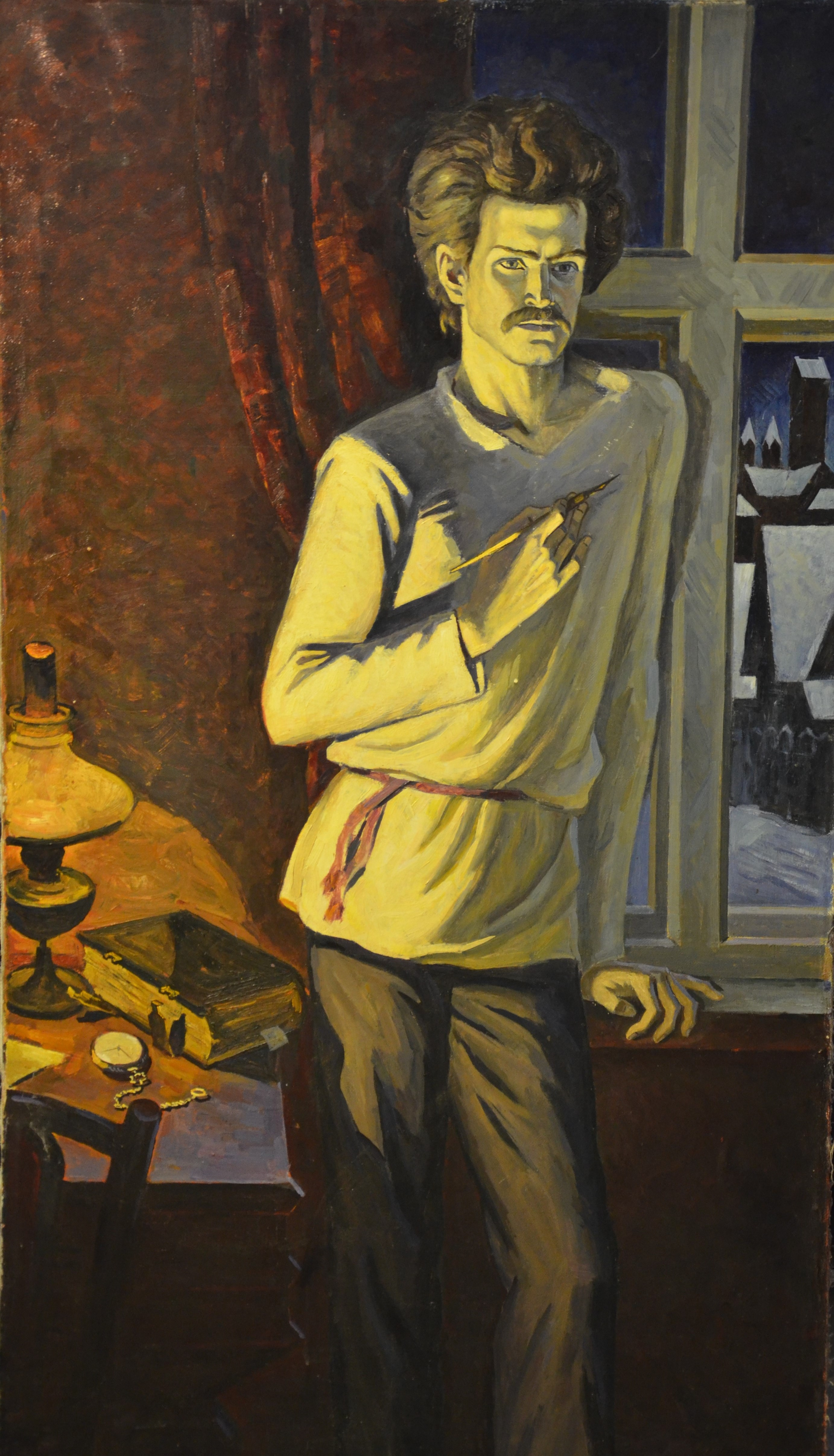
Maksim Bahdanovich by Viktar Shmatau (1916)
