= Uladzimir Karyzna =

Belarusian poet, co-writer of the national anthem (1938–2026)

- Уладзімір Іванавіч Карызна
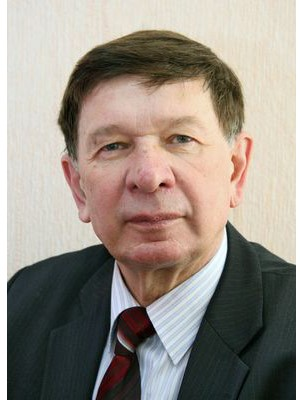
- Karyzna in 2018
- Born: 25 May 1938; Minsk, USSR
- Died: 5 March 2026 (aged 87); Belarus
- Education: Belarusian State University
- Occupation: Radio figure
- Years active: 1967–2002
- Known for: Writer of the national anthem of Belarus
- Awards: State Prize of the Republic of Belarus (1996)

Uladzimir Ivanavich Karyzna (Belarusian: Уладзімір Іванавіч Карызна, Russian: Владимир Иванович Каризна, romanized: Vladimir Ivanovich Karizna; 25 May 1938 – 5 March 2026) was a Belarusian poet. He co-wrote the lyrics of the current national anthem of Belarus, My Belarusy.

== Background ==
Karyzna was born in Zakruzhka, Minsk District on 25 May 1938. He finished the Belarusian State University in the name of Vladimir Lenin (1961), and worked as a teacher of the Belarusian and Russian languages and literature in a village school in Opsa, Braslaw District of the Vitsebsk Region. During this time, Karyzna headed literary association in the regional newspaper Braslaw star.

In 1967, he became an employee of Republican radio, where he worked for 13 years as an editor, senior editor, and in the head division of Belarusian music. He was an editor of the division of knowledge and arts in the magazine Polimya (1980–1981), senior editor, head of the editing of the edition Youth (1981–2001), and deputy of the main editor in the edition Well (2002).

Karyzna died in Minsk on 5 March 2026, at the age of 87.

== Works and activity ==
Karyzna was the author of more than 200 songs, written in sponsorship with well-known Belarusian composers. He is the author of the hymn of Nesvizh and co-wrote the lyrics of the Belarusian national anthem. Karyzna was a member of the Union of Writers of Belarus, the commission of support to youth, the commission of state prizes, a judge of the competition energetica, a judge of the Republican Youth Singing competition, a representative of the commission for prizes for trade unions, and a delegate of the 3rd National Assembly of the Republic of Belarus.

== Awards ==
Karyzna was a laureate of the state prize of the Republic of Belarus (1996), the prize of trade unions of the Belarusian SSR (1991). He was awarded the Certificate of the Supreme Soviet of the BSSR, the Certificate of the Supreme Soviet of the Lithuanian SSR, and the Order of Francysk Skaryna.
