= Francišak Kušal =

Belarusian Axis collaborator

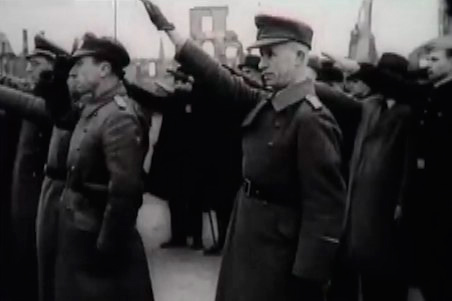
- Born: 16 February 1895; Piaršai, Minsk Governorate, Russian Empire
- Died: 25 May 1968 (aged 73); Rochester, New York, U.S.
- Relatives: Natallia Arsiennieva
- Military career
- Allegiance: Russian Empire (1916–1917); Belarusian Democratic Republic (1918–1919); Poland (1922–1939); Nazi Germany (1941–1945)
- Service years: 1916–1945
- Rank: General
- Commands: Belarusian Home Defence
- Conflicts: World War I; Russian Civil War; Polish–Soviet War; World War II; Invasion of Poland
- Awards: Order of Saint Anna Order of Saint Stanislaus (Imperial House of Romanov) Silver Cross of Merit

Francišak Vincentavič Kušal (Note: Belarusian: Францішак Вінцэнтавіч Кушаль, romanized: Frantsishak Vintsentavich Kushal′, also spelled Frantsishak Kushal; Polish: Franciszek Wincentowicz Kuszel) (16 February 1895 – 25 May 1969, also known as Franz Kushel) (Note: Belarusian: Франц Кушель, romanized: Frants Kushyel′) was a Belarusian military leader and politician. He was one of the most prominent Nazi collaborators.

== Biography ==
Kušal was born into a Roman Catholic family near Valozhyn.

After the outbreak of World War I, Kušal was drafted into the Imperial Russian Army. He graduated from the Vilnius Military School in 1916 and was sent to the Western Front.

After the October Revolution, he joined the Belarusian national movement that demanded the establishment of an independent or autonomous Belarusian republic. In 1919, he was arrested by Polish authorities for Belarusian pro-independence activism.

From 1919 to 1921, Kušal was the deputy head of the Belarusian Military Commission, a body organising Belarusian national military units within the Polish army. After the Polish–Soviet War, he joined the Polish army and graduated from an officer school in 1922. During the 1920s and 1930s, he was director and lecturer at various military schools. He was promoted to captain and awarded the Silver Cross of Merit.

After the Soviet attack on Poland, in 1939, Kušal was commander of a Polish battalion that fought the German army near Lviv. He was imprisoned and placed in a concentration camp near Starobilsk and then in Butyrka prison in Moscow. In early 1941, he was set free and sent to Białystok, then part of the Byelorussian Soviet Socialist Republic.

After the German invasion of the Soviet Union, Kušal worked as director of a training school for the Belarusian Auxiliary Police, then worked at various leading positions of the local Belarusian self-defence and police units and organising training for Belarusian officers. In 1943, Kušal became member of the Belarusian Central Council, responsible for military issues. From March 1944, he was head of the Belarusian Home Defence (BKA), a 25,000–50,000 men strong Belarusian army, for the creation of which the Belarusians received German approval at the final stage of the war.

After the withdrawal of Germans from Belarus, Kušal and his units left the country too. The Belarusian units were reorganized into units of the Waffen-SS. In April 1945, Kušal and his units surrendered to the Americans in Bavaria. He led the Displaced Persons-Camp in Michelsdorf in Cham. Later, Kušal lived in Munich.

As a Polish citizen before 1939, Kušal was not handed over to the Soviets after end of war in 1945. In 1950, Kušal emigrated to the US. In exile, he was an active member of the Belarusian American community and Belarusian political organisations. From 1952 to 1954 he was the leader of the Belarusan-American Association.

== Family ==
Kušal's wife, Natallia Arsiennieva, of Russian descent, was a notable Belarusian poet and member of the Belarusian national movement.

His younger son, Jarasłaŭ, was killed by a bomb planted by Soviet partisans in a theatre in the German-occupied Minsk.
