= Niescier Sakałoŭski =

Belarusian composer

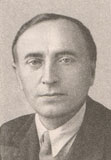
Sakałoŭski

Nieścier Sakałoŭski (Belarusian: Несьцер Сакалоўскі; Russian: Нестор Соколовский; 9 November 1902 – 13 November 1950), or Nestor Sokolovsky, was a Soviet composer.

== Career ==
Sakałoŭski composed the music for the Byelorussian SSR's regional anthem, which is used today in the national anthem of Belarus.
