= Belarusian State Philharmonic =

Belarusian Philharmonic

Belarusian Philharmonic
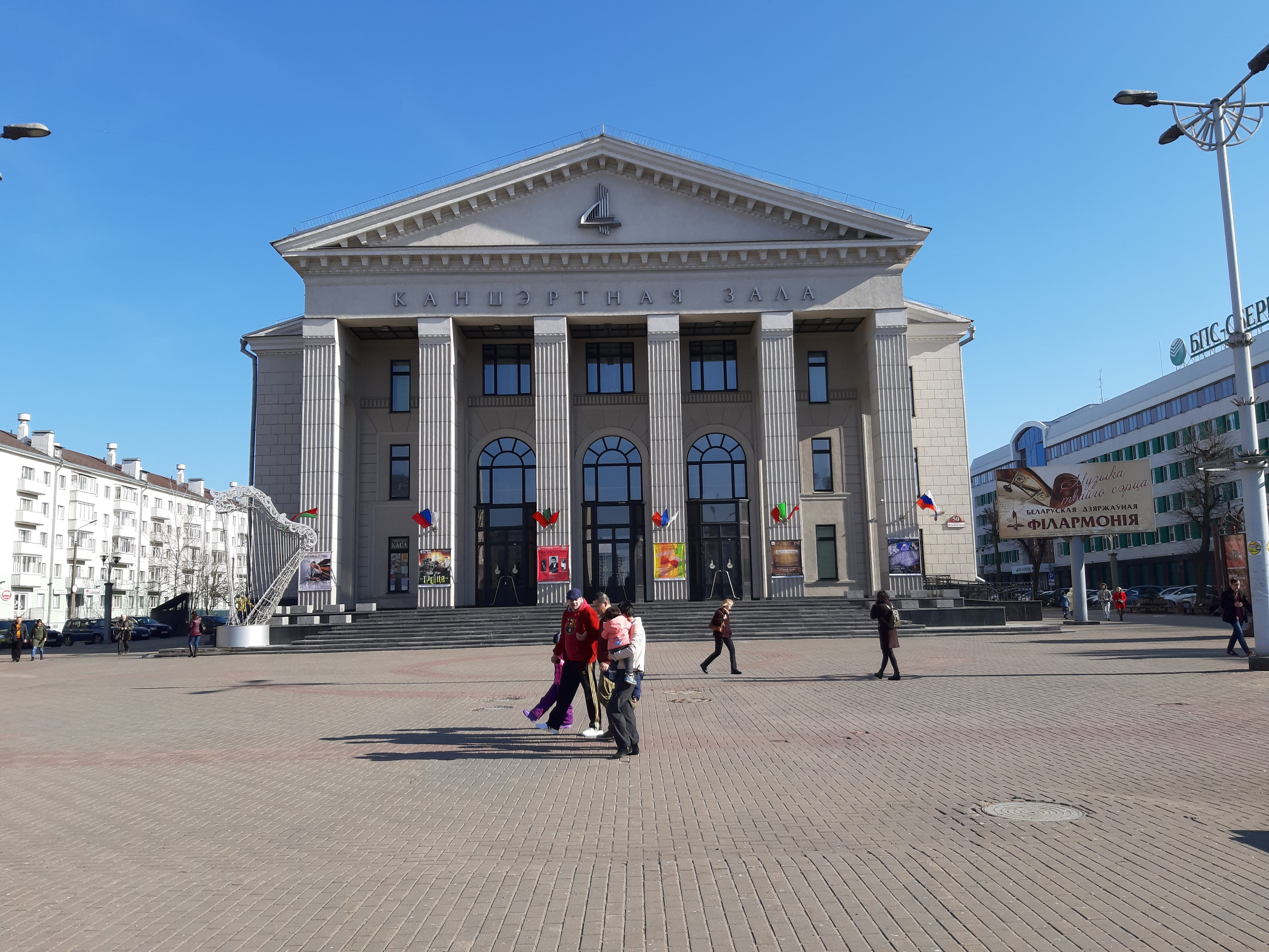
- Interactive map of Belarusian Philharmonic
- Address: Nezavisimosti 50, Minsk 220005 Belarus
- Location: Minsk, Belarus

Construction
- Opened: April 25, 1937

Website
- philharmonic.by

The Belarusian State Philharmonic is a musical institution based in Minsk, Belarus.

== History ==
The Belarusian State Philharmonic was founded on 25 April 1937. It featured a symphony orchestra, a Belarusian folk instruments ensemble, a dance ensemble, and a choir.

A 930-seat concert hall on Yakub Kolas Square opened its doors in April 1963. In 2004–2005, the hall underwent renovation. Nowadays, the Philharmonic houses the Great Hall, with 688 seats, and the Small Hall named after R. Shirma, with 200 seats.

On 13 August 2020, following the 2020 presidential election and the brutal crackdown during anti-government rallies by riot police, the Philharmonic employees joined the protests with posters My Voice Was Stolen and a performance of the iconic song Mighty God by Gregory Shirma Choir . The Philharmonic continued the protests by singing Kupalinka, Pahonia by M. Bogdanovich, Break the Prison Walls, and other songs around Minsk: on Yakub Kolas Square, in front of Minsk Tractor Works, at the indoor pavilion of Komarovsky market, at Kupalovskaya metro station, and in the atriums of Capital and Gallery shopping centers.

== List of Departments ==
- State Academic Symphony Orchestra of the Republic of Belarus
- National Academic Folk Orchestra of the Republic of Belarus named after I.Zhinovich
- State Academic Capella Choir of the Republic of Belarus named after G. Shirma
- State Chamber Orchestra of the Republic of Belarus
- State Chamber Choir of the Republic of Belarus
- Ensemble Classic-Avant-garde
- Minsk String Quartet
- Ensemble of soloists under the direction of I. Ivanov
- Belarusian State Folk Music Ensemble Svyata
- Ensemble Camerata
- Folklore group Kupalinka
- Belarusian Poetic Theater of One Actor Znich
- Concert and tour department
- Youth programs

== Soloists ==
- Arutyunova Natalia (cymbals)

== Architecture ==
The original philharmonic hall was built in 1959-1963 under the direction of G. Benedict. In 1983, five-story wings were added on both sides. The main facade is decorated with porticoes featuring six fluted pillars and a triangular pediment. Semicircular bay windows on the side facades open to the staircase foyer with a colonnade. The gypsum facades are finished with block masonry and an impressive cornice. The Greater Hall is designed as an amphitheater; it features an organ created by Czech craftsmen. The interior is decorated with the tapestry Music (1976; by V. Nemtsov, V. Tkachev, A. Yaskin).

== See also ==
- Belarusian State Academy of Music
