= Anthem of the Byelorussian Soviet Socialist Republic =

Dziaržawny himn Biełaruskaj Savieckaj Sacyjalistyčnaj Respubliki
English: Anthem of the Byelorussian Soviet Socialist Republic
- Дзяржаўны гімн Беларускай Савецкай Сацыялістычнай Рэспублікі (Belarusian)
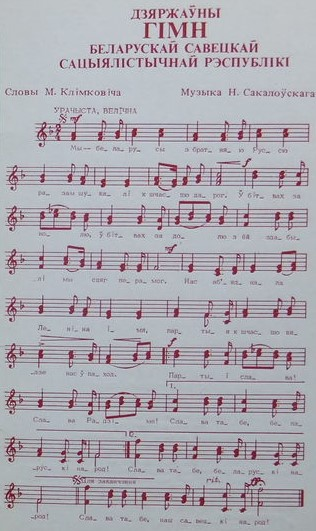
- Former regional anthem of the Byelorussian Soviet Socialist Republic
- Lyrics: Michas Klimkovič
- Music: Niescier Sakałowski, 1944
- Adopted: 17 September 1955 (first approval); 24 September 1955 (legislative approval)
- Relinquished: 1991
- Succeeded by: "My, Biełarusy"

Audio sample
- Official orchestral and instrumental recording: file; help

Vocal
Vocal recording from the 1970s

Vocal, pre 1955 version
State Academy Theatre of Minsk recording of 1952

Instrumental
2004 instrumental recording

Comparison
2002 recording of the modern anthem for comparison

Instrumental (brass band)
Members of the Military Band of the Belorussian Military District performing the Soviet version of the anthem in 1989.

The State Anthem of the Byelorussian Soviet Socialist Republic (Note: Belarusian: Дзяржаўны гімн Беларускай Савецкай Сацыялiстычнай Рэспублікі, romanized: Dziaržawny himn Biełaruskaj Savieckaj Sacyjalistyčnaj Respubliki, IPA: [dzʲɐrˈʐawnɨ ɣʲimn bʲeɫɐˈruskɐj sɐˈvʲetskɐj sɐtsɨjɐˈlʲistɨtʂnɐj rɛˈspublʲikʲi]) was the regional anthem of Belarus from 1955 to 1991 when it was a part of the former Soviet Union.

It took 11 years to create the lyrics for the anthem, even producing a version that mentions then-Soviet leader Joseph Stalin. The music was composed by Niescier Sakałowski, and the lyrics were written by Michas Klimkovič, who also created the current national anthem.

In 1991, when Belarus gained independence from the Soviet Union, it retained the melody of the Soviet-era regional anthem but got rid of the lyrics. In 2002, new lyrics were written to the same tune for the State Anthem of the Republic of Belarus.

== History ==
On 3 February 1944, the Presidium of the Supreme Soviet of the USSR issued a decree "On the State Anthems of the Soviet Republics". The Azerbaijan SSR and the Armenian SSR responded by instituting anthems by their most prominent composers, while the Lithuanian SSR reverted to its old anthem, "Tautiška giesmė".

== Lyrics ==
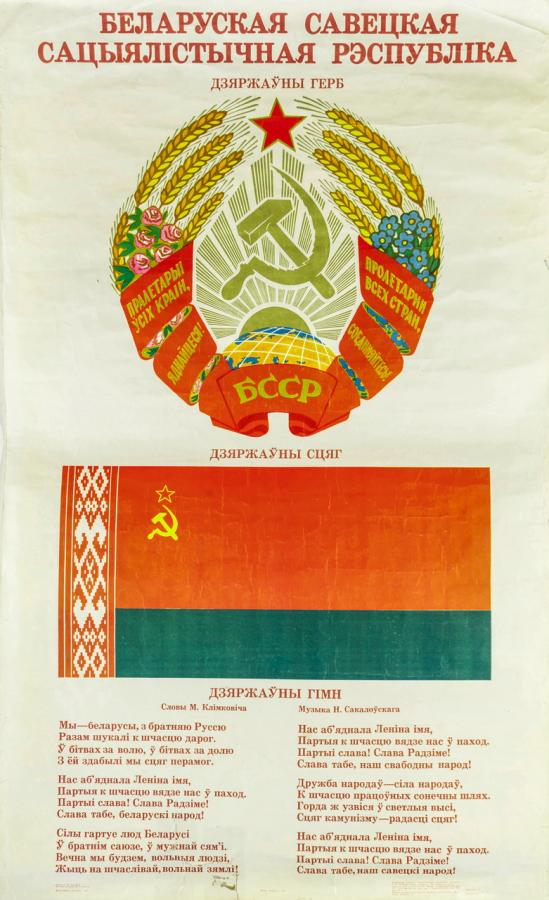
The lyrics on a poster containing the state symbols of the Byelorussian SSR.

=== Post-Stalinist lyrics (1955–1991) ===
==== Belarusian version ====
Cyrillic script

Мы, Беларусы, з братняю Руссю,
Разам шукалі к шчасцю дарог.
Ў бітвах за волю, ў бітвах за долю
З ёй здабылі мы сцяг перамог!

Прыпеў I:
Нас аб’яднала Леніна імя,
Партыя к шчасцю вядзе нас ў паход.
𝄆 Партыі слава! Слава Радзіме!
Слава табе, Беларускі народ! 𝄇

Сілы гартуе, люд Беларусі,
Ў братнім саюзе, ў мужнай сям’і.
Вечна мы будзем, вольныя людзі,
Жыць на шчаслівай, вольнай зямлі!

Прыпеў II:
Нас аб’яднала Леніна імя,
Партыя к шчасцю вядзе нас ў паход.
𝄆 Партыі слава! Слава Радзіме!
Слава табе, наш свабодны народ! 𝄇

Дружба народаў – сіла народаў,
К шчасцю працоўных сонечны шлях.
Горда ж узвіся ў светлыя высі,
Сцяг камунізму – радасці сцяг!

Прыпеў III:
Нас аб’яднала Леніна імя,
Партыя к шчасцю вядзе нас ў паход.
𝄆 Партыі слава! Слава Радзіме!
Слава табе, наш савецкі народ! 𝄇

Latin script

My, Biełarusy, z bratniaju Russiu,
Razam šukali k ščasciu daroh.
W bitvach za volu, w bitvach za dolu
Z joj zdabyli my sciah peramoh!

Prypiew I:
Nas abjadnała Lenina imia,
Partyja k ščasciu viadzie nas w pachod.
𝄆 Partyi słava! Słava Radzimie!
Słava tabie, Biełaruski narod! 𝄇

Siły hartuje, lud Biełarusi,
W bratnim sajuzie, w mužnaj siam’i.
Viečna my budziem, volnyja ludzi,
Žyć ma ščaslivaj, volnaj ziamli!

Prypiew II:
Nas abjadnała Lenina imia,
Partyja k ščasciu viadzie nas w pachod.
𝄆 Partyi słava! Słava Radzimie!
Słava tabie, naš svabodny narod! 𝄇

Družba narodaw – siła narodaw,
K ščasciu pracownych sonečny šlach.
Horda ž uzvisia w svetłyja vysi,
Sciah kamunismy – radasci sciah!

Prypiew III:
Nas abjadnała Lenina imia,
Partyja k ščasciu viadzie nas w pachod.
𝄆 Partyi słava! Słava Radzimie!
Słava tabie, naš saviecki narod! 𝄇

IPA transcription (Note: See Belarusian phonology and Help:IPA/Belarusian.)

[mɨ bʲe̞.ɫ̪ɐˈru.s̪ɨ | z̪‿ˈbrät̪.n̪ʲɐ.jʊ ˈru.s̪ʲːʊ |]
[ˈrä.z̪ɐm ʂʊˈkä.l̪ʲɪ k‿ˈʂtʂä.s̪ʲt̻s̪ʲʊ d̪ɐˈro̞x ‖]
[u̯‿ˈbʲi.d̪vɐɣ z̪ä ˈvo̞.l̪ʲʊ | u̯‿ˈbʲi.d̪vɐɣ z̪ä ˈd̪o̞.l̪ʲʊ]
[z̪ʲ‿ˈjo̞j z̪d̪ɐˈbɨ.l̪ʲɪ mɨ ˈs̪ʲt̻s̪ʲäx pʲe̞.rɐˈmo̞x ‖]

[prɨˈpʲe̞u̯ ɐˈd̻z̪ʲin̪]
[ˈn̪äs̪ ɐ.bjɐˈd̪n̪ä.ɫ̪ɐ ˈl̪ʲe̞.n̪ʲɪ.n̪ɐ ˈji.mʲɐ |]
[ˈpär.t̪ɨ.jɐ k‿ˈʂtʂä.s̪ʲt̻s̪ʲʊ vʲɐˈd̻z̪ʲe̞ n̪äs̪ u̯‿pɐˈxo̞t̪ ‖]
𝄆 [ˈpär.t̪ɨ.jɪ ˈs̪ɫ̪ä.vɐ | ˈs̪ɫ̪ä.vɐ rɐˈd̻z̪ʲi.mʲe̞ |]
[ˈs̪ɫ̪ä.vɐ t̪ɐˈbʲe̞ | bʲe̞.ɫ̪ɐˈru.s̪ʲkʲɪ n̪ɐˈro̞t̪ ‖] 𝄇

[ˈs̪ʲi.ɫ̪ɨ ɣɐrˈt̪u.je̞ | ˈl̪ʲud̪ bʲe̞.ɫ̪ɐˈru.s̪ʲɪ |]
[u̯‿ˈbrät̪.n̪ʲɪm s̪ɐˈju.z̪ʲe̞ | u̯‿ˈmu.ʐnɐj s̪ʲɐmˈji ‖]
[ˈvʲe̞.tʂn̪ɐ mɨ ˈbu.d̻z̪ʲe̞m | ˈvo̞l̪ʲ.n̪ɨ.jɐ ˈl̪ʲu.d̻z̪ʲɪ |]
[ˈʐɨt̻s̪ʲ n̪ä ˈʂtʂä.s̪ʲl̪ʲɪ.vɐj | ˈvo̞l̪ʲ.n̪ɐj z̪ʲɐˈmʲl̪ʲi ‖]

[prɨˈpʲe̞u̯ ˈd̪vä]
[ˈn̪äs̪ ɐ.bjɐˈd̪n̪ä.ɫ̪ɐ ˈl̪ʲe̞.n̪ʲɪ.n̪ɐ ˈji.mʲɐ |]
[ˈpär.t̪ɨ.jɐ k‿ˈʂtʂä.s̪ʲt̻s̪ʲʊ vʲɐˈd̻z̪ʲe̞ n̪äs̪ u̯‿pɐˈxo̞t̪ ‖]
𝄆 [ˈpär.t̪ɨ.jɪ ˈs̪ɫ̪ä.vɐ | ˈs̪ɫ̪ä.vɐ rɐˈd̻z̪ʲi.mʲe̞ |]
[ˈs̪ɫ̪ä.vɐ t̪ɐˈbʲe̞ | ˈn̪äʂ s̪vɐˈbo̞.d̪n̪ɨ n̪ɐˈro̞t̪ ‖] 𝄇

[ˈd̪ru.ʐbɐ n̪ɐˈro̞.d̪ɐu̯ | ˈs̪ʲi.ɫ̪ɐ n̪ɐˈro̞.d̪ɐu̯ |]
[k‿ˈʂtʂä.s̪ʲt̻s̪ʲʊ prɐˈt̻s̪o̞u̯.n̪ɨx ˈs̪o̞.n̪ʲe̞.tʂn̪ɨ ˈʂl̪ʲäx ‖]
[ˈɣo̞r.d̪ɐ ʐ‿ʊˈz̪ʲvʲi.s̪ʲɐ u̯‿ˈs̪ʲvʲe̞.t̪ɫ̪ɨ.jɐ ˈvɨ.s̪ʲɪ ǀ]
[ˈs̪ʲt̻s̪ʲäx kɐ.mʊˈn̪ʲi.z̪mʊ | ˈrä.d̪ɐ.s̪ʲt̻s̪ʲɪ ˈs̪ʲt̻s̪ʲäx ‖]

[prɨˈpʲe̞u̯ ˈtrɨ]
[ˈn̪äs̪ ɐ.bjɐˈd̪n̪ä.ɫ̪ɐ ˈl̪ʲe̞.n̪ʲɪ.n̪ɐ ˈji.mʲɐ |]
[ˈpär.t̪ɨ.jɐ k‿ˈʂtʂä.s̪ʲt̻s̪ʲʊ vʲɐˈd̻z̪ʲe̞ n̪äs̪ u̯‿pɐˈxo̞t̪ ‖]
𝄆 [ˈpär.t̪ɨ.jɪ ˈs̪ɫ̪ä.vɐ | ˈs̪ɫ̪ä.vɐ rɐˈd̻z̪ʲi.mʲe̞ |]
[ˈs̪ɫ̪ä.vɐ t̪ɐˈbʲe̞ | ˈn̪äʂ s̪ɐˈvʲe̞.t̻s̪ʲkʲɪ n̪ɐˈro̞t̪ ‖] 𝄇

==== English translation ====
We, Belarusians, brothers of Russians,
Together we looked for the path to fortune.
Struggles for freedom, in struggles for fate,
We have gained our banner of victories.

Chorus I:
The name of Lenin has brought us together,
The Party leads us in our quest for joy.
𝄆 Glory to the Party! Glory to our homeland!
Glory to you, Belarusian people! 𝄇

People of Belarus, gaining strength,
In a fraternal, powerful union.
We shall forever be a free people,
To live on a land of freedom and joy!

Chorus II:
The name of Lenin has brought us together,
The Party leads us in our quest for joy.
𝄆 Glory to the Party! Glory to our homeland!
Glory to you, liberated people! 𝄇

The people's friendship – strength of the people,
The joy of the workers is the sunny path.
We proudly raise to the high skies,
Communism's banner – the flag of joy!

Chorus III:
The name of Lenin has brought us together,
The Party leads us in quest to joy.
𝄆 Glory to the Party! Glory to our homeland!
Glory to you, our Soviet people! 𝄇

Translation:

=== Original lyrics ===
==== Belarusian version ====
Cyrillic script

Мы, Беларусы, з братняю Руссю,
Разам шукалі к долі дарог.
Ў бітвах за волю, ў бітвах за долю
Мы здабылі з ёй сцяг перамог!

Прыпеў:
Нас аб’яднала Леніна імя,
Сталін павёў нас к шчасцю ў паход.
𝄆 Слава Саветам! Слава Радзіме!
Слава табе, Беларускі народ! 𝄇

Ў слаўным саюзе люд Беларусі
Вырас, як волат нашых былін.
Вечна мы будзем вольныя людзі,
Жыць на шчаслівай, вольнай зямлі!

Прыпеў

Дружбай народаў мы назаўсёды,
Нашы граніцы ў сталь закуём.
Ворагаў хмары грозным ударам,
З нашых прастораў прэч мы змяцём!

Прыпеў

Latin script

My, Biełarusy, z bratniaju Russiu,
Razam šukali k doli daroh.
W bitvach za volyu,W bitvach za dolyu
My zdabyli z joj sciah peramoh!

Prypiew:
Nas abjadnała Lenina imia,
Stalin paviow nas k ščasciu w pachod.
𝄆 Słava Savietam! Słava Radzimie!
Słava tabie, Biełaruski narod! 𝄇

W sławnym sajuzie lud Biełarusi
Vyras, jak vołat našych bylin.
Viečna my budziem volnyja ludzi,
Žyć na ščaslivaj, volnaj ziamli!

Prypiew

Družbaj narodaw my nazawsiody,
Našy hranicy w stal zakujom.
Vorahaw chmary hroznym uradam,
Z našych prastoraw preč my zmiaciom!

Prypiew

IPA transcription

[mɨ bʲe̞.ɫ̪ɐˈru.s̪ɨ | z̪‿ˈbrät̪.n̪ʲɐ.jʊ ˈru.s̪ʲːʊ |]
[ˈrä.z̪ɐm ʂʊˈkä.l̪ʲɪ g‿ˈd̪o̞.l̪ʲɪ d̪ɐˈro̞x ‖]
[u̯‿ˈbʲi.d̪vɐɣ z̪ä ˈvo̞.l̪ʲʊ | u̯‿ˈbʲi.d̪vɐɣ z̪ä ˈd̪o̞.l̪ʲʊ]
[mɨ z̪d̪ɐˈbɨ.l̪ʲɪ z̪ʲ‿ˈjo̞j ˈs̪ʲt̻s̪ʲäx pʲe̞.rɐˈmo̞x ‖]

[prɨˈpʲe̞u̯]
[ˈn̪äs̪ ɐ.bjɐˈd̪n̪ä.ɫ̪ɐ ˈl̪ʲe̞.n̪ʲɪ.n̪ɐ ˈji.mʲɐ |]
[ˈs̪t̪ä.l̪ʲɪn̪ pɐˈvʲo̞u̯ ˈn̪äs̪ k‿ˈʂtʂä.s̪ʲt̻s̪ʲʊ u̯‿pɐˈxo̞t̪ ‖]
𝄆 [ˈs̪ɫ̪ä.vɐ s̪ɐˈvʲe̞.t̪ɐm | ˈs̪ɫ̪ä.vɐ rɐˈd̻z̪ʲi.mʲe̞ |]
[ˈs̪ɫ̪ä.vɐ t̪ɐˈbʲe̞ | bʲe̞.ɫ̪ɐˈru.s̪ʲkʲɪ n̪ɐˈro̞t̪ ‖] 𝄇

[u̯‿ˈs̪ɫ̪äu̯.n̪ɨm s̪ɐˈju.z̪ʲe̞ ˈl̪ʲud̪ bʲe̞.ɫ̪ɐˈru.s̪ʲɪ |]
[ˈvɨ.rɐs̪ jäg ˈvo̞.ɫ̪ɐt̪ ˈnä.ʂɨɣ bɨˈl̪ʲin̪ ‖]
[ˈvʲe̞.tʂn̪ɐ mɨ ˈbu.d̻z̪ʲe̞m ˈvo̞l̪ʲ.n̪ɨ.jɐ ˈl̪ʲu.d̻z̪ʲɪ |]
[ˈʐɨt̻s̪ʲ n̪ä ˈʂtʂä.s̪ʲl̪ʲɪ.vɐj | ˈvo̞l̪ʲ.n̪ɐj z̪ʲɐˈmʲl̪ʲi ‖]

[prɨˈpʲe̞u̯]

[ˈd̪ru.ʐbɐj n̪ɐˈro̞.d̪ɐu̯ mɨ n̪ɐ.z̪ɐu̯ˈs̪ʲo̞.d̪ɨ |]
[ˈn̪ä.ʂɨ ɣrɐˈn̪ʲi.t̻s̪ɨ u̯‿ˈs̪t̪äɫ̪ z̪ɐ.kʊˈjo̞m ‖]
[ˈvo̞.rɐ.ɣɐu̯ ˈxmä.rɨ ˈxro̞.z̪n̪ɨm ˈu.d̪ɐ.rɐm |]
[z̪‿ˈn̪ä.ʂɨx prɐˈs̪t̪o̞.rɐu̯ ˈpre̞tʂ mɨ z̪ʲmʲɐˈt̻s̪ʲo̞m ‖]

[prɨˈpʲe̞u̯]

==== English translation ====
We Belarusians, with brother Russia,
Together looking for roads to the share.
In struggles for freedom, in struggles for fate,
We have found our banner of victories!

Chorus:
The name of Lenin united us,
Stalin leadeth us in quest to joy.
𝄆 Glory to the Soviets! Glory to the Motherland!
Glory to ye, our Belarusian people! 𝄇

The people of Belarus in thy glorious union
Grew up as the heroes of our epics.
We shall forever be a free people,
To live on a happy, free land!

Chorus

Friendship of peoples is what we stand for
Our steel borders are what we'll defend.
O'er our formidable foes do clouds blow,
We shall sweep them away from lands of our own!

Chorus

Translation:
