= Maksim Bahdanovich =

Belarusian writer

- Максім Багдановіч
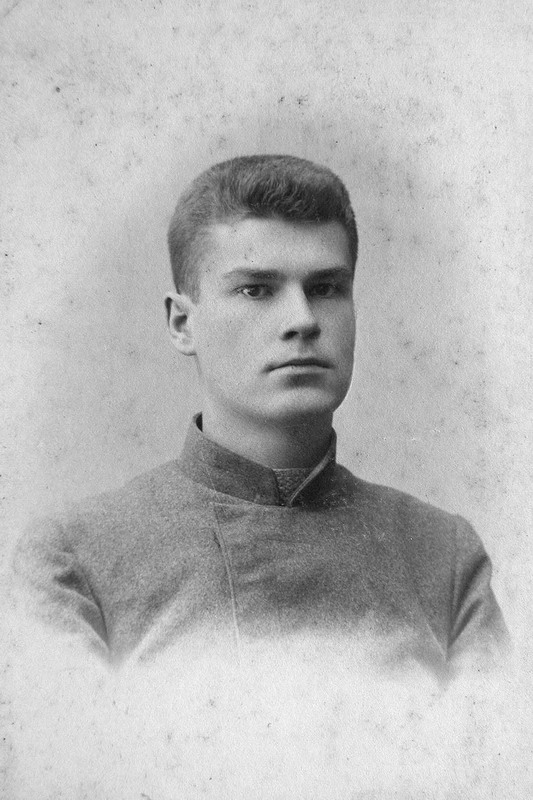
- Born: 9 December 1891; Minsk, Russian Empire (now Belarus)
- Died: 25 May 1917 (aged 25); Yalta, Taurida Governorate, Russia (now Ukraine)
- Occupations: Poet; publicist; translator; literary critic
- Writing career
- Pen name: Maksim Knizhnik (Максім Кніжнік)
- Period: 1907–1917
- Genres: Verse; poem
- Literary movement: Impressionism; symbolism

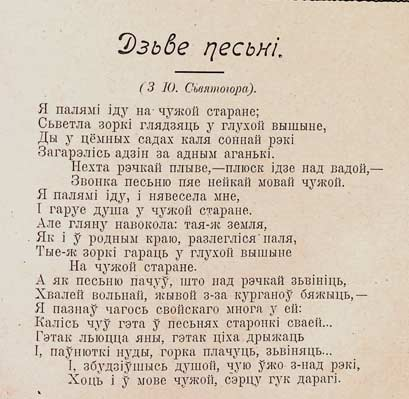
Sample of the poem "Two songs"

Maksim Adamavich Bahdanovich (Belarusian: Максім Адамавіч Багдановіч, IPA: [makˈsʲim aˈdamavʲid͡ʐ baɣdaˈnɔvʲit͡ɕ]; Russian: Максим Адамович Богданович, romanized: Maksim Adamovich Bogdanovich; 9 December 1891 – 25 May 1917) was a Belarusian poet, journalist, translator, literary critic and historian of literature. He is considered one of the founders of the modern Belarusian literature.

== Life ==
Bahdanovich was born in Minsk in the family of Adam Bahdanovič, an important Belarusian ethnographer, who through most of his career worked as a bank clerk. Maksim was born in a family apartment at Karakazov House located at Trinity Hill next to the First Parish School. His father was of unlanded peasantry family, while his mother (née Myakota) was of old Belarusian noble family of Kurcz coat of arms that was not adopted in the Russian Empire. Grandfather on his mother side, Apanas Janovich Myakota, was a Russian veteran of the Crimean War who for his military service received a lifelong nobility. Both of Maksim parents graduated pedagogical schools. Later father of Maksim, Adam, was involved with members of the revolutionary anti-tsarist Narodnaya Volya organization.

In 1892, the family moved to Hrodna where Maksim's father received a job at local bank. Soon after the move the future poet's mother, Maria, died of tuberculosis in 1896.

In 1896, Adam Bahdanovich moved with his children to Nizhny Novgorod, Russia. At that time Maksim wrote his first poems in the Belarusian language. In 1902 Bahdanovich attended a gymnasium. During the Revolution of 1905 he was an active participant of the strikes organised by his commilitodes.

In 1907, Nasha Niva came out with Bahdanovich's first published work — the novel Muzyka.

In June 1908, the poet's family moved to Yaroslavl'. After finishing school in 1911 Bahdanovich went to Belarus to meet important figures of the Belarusian Renaissance: Vaclau Lastouski, Ivan Luckievič and Anton Luckievich. In the same year he began studying of law at a Yaroslavl' lyceum. During his studies Bahdanovich worked at a newspaper, wrote numerous works of literature and was actively published in both Belarus and Russia.

In the beginning of 1914, his only book of poems, Vianok (A Wreath), was published in Vilna (today Vilnius).

In the summer of 1916, after absolvation of the lyceum, Maksim Bahdanovich moved to Minsk and worked there at the local guberniya administration.

In February 1917, Bahdanovich went to Crimea to be treated for tuberculosis. The treatment was unsuccessful, and that year he died in Yalta.

The poet's papers were kept at his father's house, but the collection was heavily damaged during the Russian Civil War in 1918.

== Belarusian literature ==
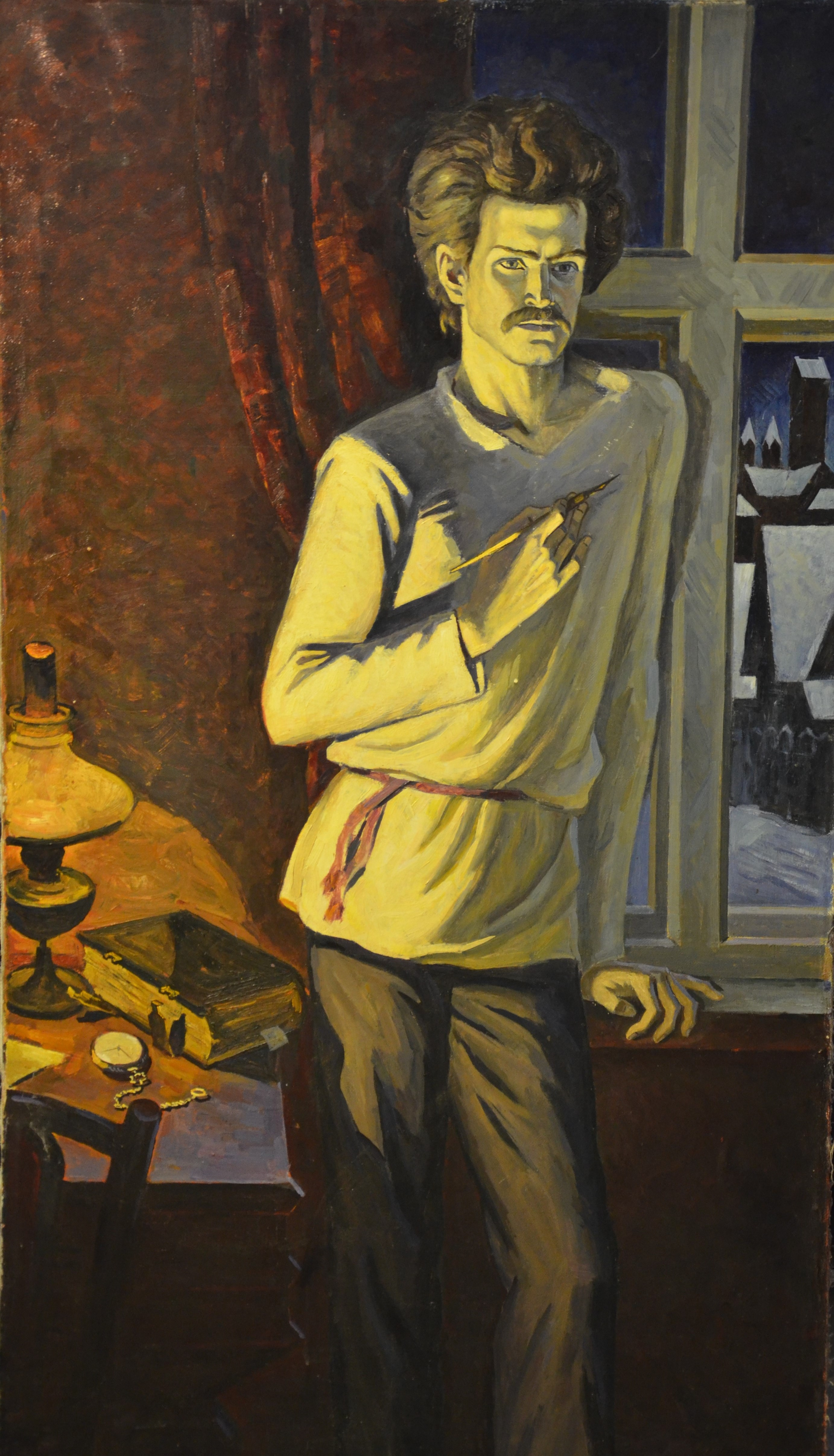
Maksim Bahdanovich by Viktar Shmatau (1916)

In 1991–1995 a full collection of Bahdanovich's poetry was published in Belarus.

Nowadays there are museums of the poet open in Minsk (Maksim Bahdanovich Literary Museum), Hrodna and Yaroslavl'. Several streets in major cities of Belarus and Russia are named after him.

The operas Zorka Venera (by Jury Siemianiaka and Ales' Bachyla), and Maksim (by Ihar Palivoda).

Bahdanovich created many examples of social, artistic and philosophical lyrics. He was the first poet to introduce several new lyrical forms to Belarusian literature.

Maksim Bahdanovich was a translator of Paul Verlaine, Heinrich Heine, Alexander Pushkin, Ovid, Horace and other poets into Belarusian and of Janka Kupala, Taras Shevchenko, Ivan Franko into Russian.

== Literary work ==
In 1916, Maksim Bahdanovich wrote a poem “Pahonia”. The music was written by a Belarusian composer and immigrant activist Mikalay Shchahlou-Kulikovich. The song was originally meant to be sung a capella. Mikola Ravienski, Aliaksiej Turankoŭ and Vladimir Mulyavin also wrote their own musical arrangements. In the early 1990s, Shchahlou-Kulikovich’s version was considered as one of the options for the national anthem of the Republic of Belarus. In 2020, under the patronage of Anton Mezhy a choral performance of the anthem was recorded with an orchestra accompaniment.

In 2020, the "Pahonia" anthem and the poem resurged in popularity as one of the symbols of the 2020 Belarusian protests against the Lukashenko regime, along with the white-red-white flag. The anthem was spontaneously performed in several public places: near the Belarusian State Philharmonic, in malls, in the Minsk subway, at the Minsk Kamaroŭski market, and at the Minsk railway station.
