= Mikhas Lynkov =

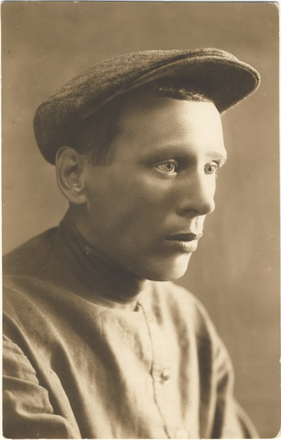
- Born: 30 November 1899 Zazyby, Vitebsk Governorate, Russian Empire (now Belarus)
- Died: 21 September 1975 (aged 75) Minsk, Byelorussian SSR, Soviet Union
- Occupation: Novelist, literary critic, journalist
- Language: Belarusian, Russian
- Citizenship: Soviet

Mikhas Tsikhanovich Lynkov (Belarusian: Міха́сь Ці́ханавіч Лынько́ў; Russian: Михаи́л Ти́хонович Лынько́в; 30 November 1899 – 21 September 1975) was a Belarusian Soviet writer and public figure.

== Biography ==
Born in to the family of a railway worker, Lynkov graduated from the Rogachev Teachers' Seminary in 1917.

From 1918, Lynkov was a participant in the establishment of the Partisan movement in Belarus and from 1919 to 1922 he served in the Red Army and participated in the Soviet-Polish war. From 1926, he was a member of the Communist Party of Byelorussia.

In 1919, he published his first work (a poem) in the Smolensk newspaper Borba. He worked as a teacher in the village of Lipinichi, editor of the daily Bobruisk district newspaper Kamunist (Communist), wrote under several pseudonyms (Mikhas Vasilek and others). Lynkov did a great amount of improving for the newspaper, which at that time published materials in several languages: Belarusian, Russian, Yiddish and Ukrainian. Lynkov acted as one of the initiators of the creation of the Bobruisk branch of the Belarusian literary association "Maladnyak". In 1930Lynkov moved to Minsk, where he worked at the State Publishing House of the Byelorussian SSR.

From 1933 to 1941 Lynkov was editor of the leading Belarusian literary magazine Polymya revalyutsy (Flame of Revolution), where he defended the Belarusian language.

Since its founding in 1934, he was a member of the Union of Soviet Writers. From 1938 to 1948 he headed the Union of Writers of the Byelorussian SSR.

In 1941-1942, he was the editor of the front-line newspaper "Za Savetskuyu Belarus" (For Soviet Belarus).

From 1943 to 1946 and from 1949 to 1952 he was director of the Institute of Literature, Language and Art of the Academy of Sciences of the BSSR.

Mikhas Lynkov died on September 21, 1975. He was buried in Minsk at the Eastern Cemetery.

== Selected works ==
- Выбраныя апавяданні / Міхась Лынькоў. — Мн.: Дзяржвыд Беларусі..Дзіцячая літ., 1938.
- Выбраныя творы / Міхась Лынькоў. — Мінск: Дзяржвыд БССР, 1952. — 551, [2] с., [1] л. партр.
- Векапомныя дні: раман у 4 кн. / Міхась Лынькоў. — Мінск: Беларусь, 1969. — (Беларускі раман).
- Апавяданні / Міхась Лынькоў. — Мінск: Дзяржаўнае вучэбна-педагагічнае выдавецтва Міністэрства асветы БССР, 1960.
- Літаратура і жыццё: літаратурна-крытычныя артыкулы / Міхась Лынькоў. — Мінск: Мастацкая літаратура, 1978.
- Публіцыстыка / Міхась Лынькоў. — Мінск: Мастацкая літаратура, 1980. — 271, [1] с.
- Насустрач жыццю: апавяданні / Міхась Лынькоў. — Мінск: Юнацтва, 1988. — (Школьная бібліятэка).

== Awards ==
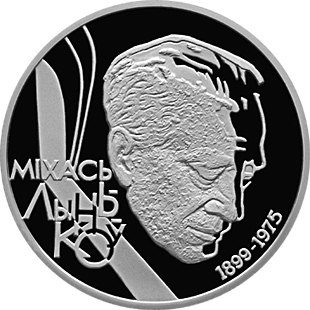
Commemorative coin of the National Bank of the Republic of Belarus dedicated to the 100th anniversary of the birth of Mikhail Lynkov

- People's Writer of the Byelorussian SSR (1962)
- Three Orders of Lenin (1949, 1955, 1969)
- Order of the October Revolution (1974)
- Three Orders of the Red Banner of Labor (1939, 1959, 1967)
- Order of the Red Star (1943)
