= Kanstantsia Builo =

Belarusian poet and playwright

Kanstancyja Bujło
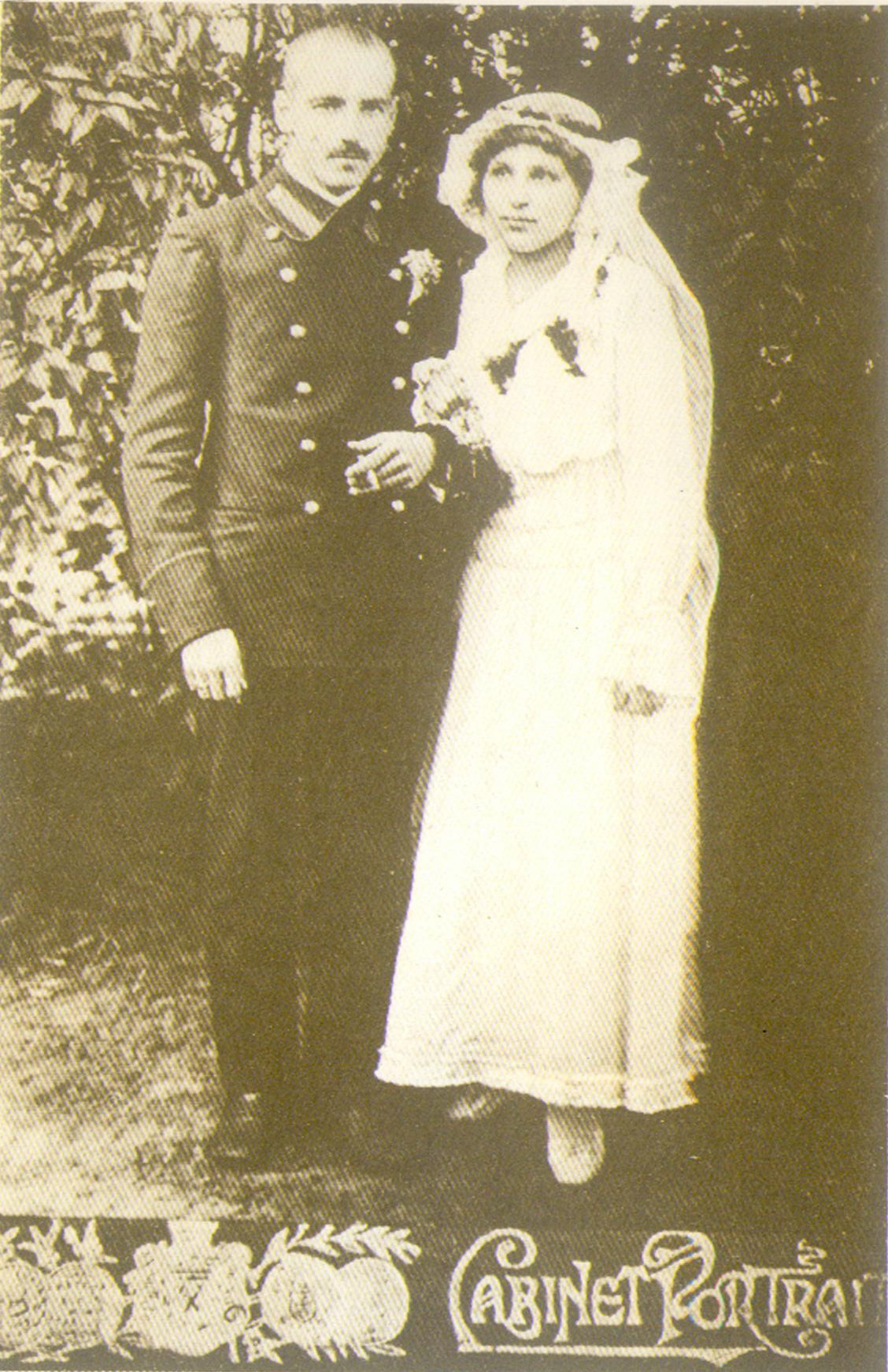
- Bujło with her husband in 1916
- Born: 1893
- Died: 1986 (aged 92–93)
- Other name: (Belarusian: Канстанцыя Буйло
- Occupations: poet and playwright

Kanstancyja Bujło (Belarusian: Канстанцыя Буйло) (1893–1986) was a Belarusian poet and playwright.

Bujło's first publication in 1909 was Mound Flower, edited by Janka Kupała. The main themes of her poems, which often relied on folklore, were on peasant life in Belarus before 1917, and World War II heroism. One of her most notable poems was I Love Our Land.
