= Mahutny Bozha =

Belarusian hymn

"Mahutny Boža"

Hymn
- Language: Belarusian
- English title: Almighty God
- Written: 1947
- Genre: Belarusian national hymn
- Songwriter: Natalla Arsieńnieva
- Composer: Mikoła Ravienski

"Mahutny Boža" (Belarusian: Магутны Божа; also translated as "Almighty God") is a famous Belarusian hymn, based on a poem by Natalla Arsieńnieva and music by Mikoła Ravienski. It was translated into English by Vera Rich.

The hymn has given its name to a festival of ecclesiastical music in Mahiloŭ and became one of the protest songs during the 2020-21 Belarusian protests.

== History ==
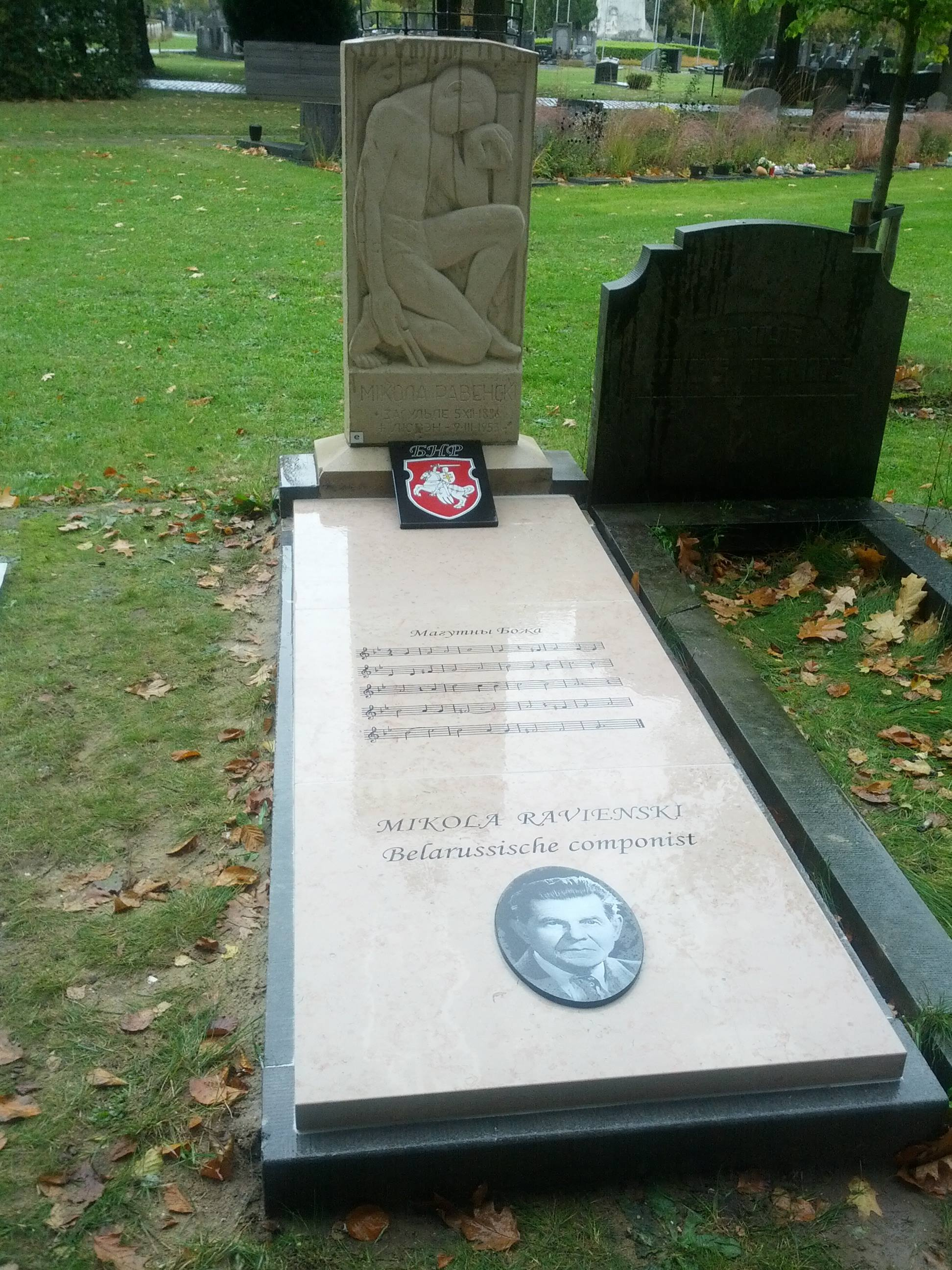
The tombstone on Mikola Ravienski's grave in Leuven, Belgium with the sheet music of Mahutny Boža engraved

In 1947 composer Mikoła Ravienski wrote music for the poem "Prayer" written by Natalla Arsieńnieva four years earlier. Soon it became widely used by Belarusian communities in the UK, US, Canada and Australia.

Since the late 1980s, the hymn has gained popularity in post-Soviet Belarus. In 1993 the Catholic Church in Belarus initiated a festival of ecclesiastical music in Mahilioŭ which was named after the hymn.

In 1995 the hymn was proposed as one of the candidates for the national anthem of Belarus. However, the government of Alaksandr Łukašenka instead adopted the old anthem of Soviet Belarus with some variation to the lyrics.

In 2005 Mahutny Boža was translated into English by Vera Rich.

During the 2020-21 Belarusian protests the hymn became one of the protest songs and its performance was banned within the Belarusian parishes of the Russian Orthodox Church.

In spring 2021, the hymn was recognised as "one of the most popular Belarusian music pieces".

== Lyrics ==
Belarusian lyrics (Cyrillic script) Магутны Божа	Belarusian lyrics (Łacinka) Mahutny Boža	English translation Almighty God
Магутны Божа! Ўладар сусьветаў, Вялікіх сонцаў і сэрц малых! Над Беларусяй, ціхай і ветлай, Рассып праменьні свае хвалы.	Mahutny Boža! Ŭładar suśvietaŭ, Vialikich soncaŭ i serc małych! Nad Biełarusiaj cichaj i vietłaj Rassyp pramieńni svaje chvały.	O God almighty, O Lord of creation, Of splendid suns and of humble hearts, To Belarus, peaceful and patient, The radiance of Thy glory impart.
Дай спор у працы штодзеннай, шэрай, На лусту хлеба, на родны край, Павагу, сілу і веліч веры У нашу праўду, у прышласьць — дай!	Daj spor u pracy štodzionnaj šeraj, Na łustu chleba, na rodny kraj, Pavahu, siłu i vielič viery U našu praŭdu, u pryšłaść — daj!	O bless our daily toil, performed soundly, For native land and for bread to live, Honour and dignity and faith abounding In our cause, in our future — O give!
Дай урадлівасьць жытнёвым нівам, Учынкам нашым пашлі ўмалот! Зрабі магутнай, зрабі шчасьлівай Краіну нашу і наш народ!	Daj uradlivaść žytniovym nivam, Učynkam našym pajšli ŭmałot! Zrabi mahutnaj, zrabi ščaślivaj Krainu našu i naš narod!	The fruitfulness of our fields do Thou foster, Good winnowed grain give as toil's reward, O make them free, O make them prosper — Our people and our country, O Lord!
