= Natallia Arsiennieva =

Belarusian playwright and poet (1903–1997)

- Наталля Арсеннева
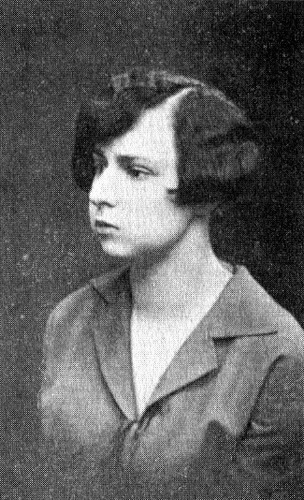
- Born: September 20, 1903; Baku, Russian Empire
- Died: July 25, 1997 (aged 93); Rochester, New York, U.S.
- Citizenship: Russian Empire → Poland → United States
- Occupations: Linguist, playwright, translator, poet, writer
- Spouse: Francišak Kušal
- Writing career
- Language: Belarusian, Russian

Natallia Alyakseyewna Arsiennieva (Note: Belarusian: Наталля Аляксееўна Арсеннева, romanized: Natallya Alyaksyeyewna Arsyennyeva, also spelled Arsenneva and Arsieńjeva; Russian: Наталья Алексеевна Арсеньева, romanized: Natalya Alekseyevna Arsenyeva) (20 September 1903 – 25 July 1997) was a Belarusian playwright, poet and translator who authored the lyrics to the hymn "Mahutny Boža" ("Almighty God"). She was married to Francišak Kušal.

== Biography ==
=== Early life ===
Arsiennieva was born on 20 September 1903 into a middle-class family in Baku, a major oil-producing centre of the Russian Empire (today the capital of Azerbaijan).

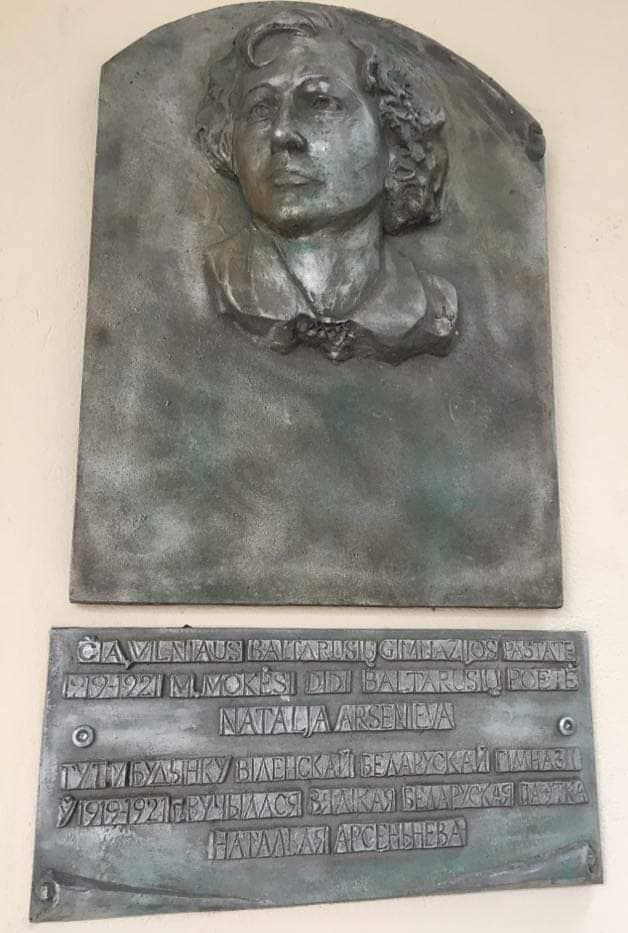
The plaque at the entrance of the Belarusian Gimnasium of Vilnia stating that Natallia Arsiennieva, great Belarusian poet, attended the Gimnasium in 1919-1921

In 1905, Arsiennieva's family moved first to Volhynia (Volyn) and then to Wilno (Vilnius) where she spent her childhood and graduated from the Belarusian gymnasium of Wilno in 1921. She later studied at the Arts Department of the University of Wilno.

In 1922, Arsiennieva married Francišak Kušal, a prominent figure of the Belarusian independence movement and Nazi collaborator.

=== World War II ===
Following the Soviet invasion of Poland, her husband, who was at the time an officer of the Polish army, was taken as a prisoner of war and spent a year in Soviet incarceration before being sent to Minsk in 1941. After Minsk was captured by the German army in 1941, he became a Nazi collaborator, rising to become a commander in the Belarusian Home Defence.

Arsiennieva worked for a regional Soviet newspaper but was soon arrested and deported as a "bourgeois nationalist intellectual" to Kazakhstan with her two sons. However, in early 1941, she was released after a petition by the Belarusian Union of Writers and moved to Minsk, where during the German occupation she also collaborated with the Nazis, working for the pro-Nazi Belaruskaya Gazeta. She wrote several librettos for operas and was engaged in translations.

=== Later life ===
In 1944, Arsiennieva moved to Germany, and in 1950, to the United States. She was involved in the establishment, and was a long-term secretary, of the Belarusan-American Association. She was also the editor of the newspaper Biełarus and worked for Radio Free Europe/Radio Liberty and the Belarusan Institute of Arts and Sciences.

Arsiennieva died on July 25, 1997, in Rochester, New York, and is buried in a local cemetery.

== Legacy ==
Arsiennieva's works were banned in Soviet Belarus; however, she lived to see their return to her homeland. Since Gorbachev's perestroika, her poems have gained popularity, especially "Prayer", which, set to music by composer Mikola Ravienski, has become the hymn "Mahutny Boža" ("Almighty God"). In 1991, the publishing house "Mastackaja litaratura" published her facsimile "Under the Blue Sky"("Пад сінім небам"). In 1996, in the series "Voices of the Belarusians Abroad", a collection of selected poems "Another Spring" ("Яшчэ адна вясна") was published, and in 2002, a compilation of her selected poems was published.

However, since 1998, her works have been excluded from the school curriculum by the government of Alexander Lukashenko.

In 2003, a monument was erected in her memory in the town of Staryya Darohi, Minsk Region, on the territory of a private museum. In November 2022, the monument was removed.

== Works ==
=== Poems ===
- Люблю я сонца залатое. Вечар неба фарбуе (Вершы) // Родныя гоні : месячнік літаратуры й культуры Заходняе Беларусі,1927, сакавік [I love the golden sun. The evening paints the sky (Poems) // Native lands: monthly magazine of literature and culture of Western Belarus, 1927, March], No. 1, p. 3, 4 (in Belarusian)
- Сьміялася ў вочы вясна. Вячорная часіна (Вершы) // Родныя гоні : месячнік літаратуры й культуры Заходняе Беларусі, 1927, красавік [Spring laughed in my eyes. Evening time (Poems) // Native lands: monthly magazine of literature and culture of Western Belarus, 1927, April], No. 2, p. 1, 2 (in Belarusian)
- Паралель (Верш) // Родныя гоні : месячнік літаратуры й культуры Заходняе Беларусі, 1927, май [Parallel (Poem) // Native lands: monthly magazine of literature and culture of Western Belarus,1927, May], No. 3, p. 4. (in Belarusian)
- Веснавая калыханка. Ішла вясна. *** (Вершы) // Родныя гоні : месячнік літаратуры й культуры Заходняе Беларусі, 1927, чэрвень [Spring lullaby. It was spring. *** (Poems) // Native lands: monthly magazine of literature and culture of Western Belarus, 1927, June], No. 4, p. 2-5 (in Belarusian)
- Маячэньні... Калі... Вясёлка. (Вершы) // Родныя гоні : месячнік літаратуры й культуры Заходняе Беларусі, 1927, ліпень—жнівень [Looming ... When ... Rainbow (Poems) // Native lands: monthly magazine of literature and culture of Western Belarus, 1927, July–August], No. 5, p. 1, 2 (in Belarusian)
- Пад сінім небам: Вершы, 1921—1925 [Under the Blue Sky: Poems, 1921—1925], Vilnius, 1927 (in Belarusian)
- «Жоўтая восень» (не надрукаваны) ["Yellow Autumn" (not printed)] (in Belarusian)
- Сягоньня: Вершы, 1941—1943 [Today: Poems, 1941-1943], Minsk, 1944 (in Belarusian)
- Між берагамі: Выбар паэзіі, 1920—1970 [Between the Shores: A Selection of Poetry, 1920-1970], New York, Toronto, 1979 (in Belarusian)
- Натальля Арсеньнева. Пад сінім небам. Вершы (1920—1925). — Факсімільнае выданьне. — Менск: Мастацкая літаратура, 1992 («Бацькаўшчына»), ISBN 5-340-01267-0 Natallia Arsiennieva. Under the blue sky. Poems (1920-1925). - Facsimile edition. - Minsk: Mastackaja litaratura, 1992 ("Baćkaŭščyna"), ISBN 5-340-01267-0 (in Belarusian)
- Натальля Арсеньнева. Пад сінім небам (1920—1925). Жоўтая восень (1927—1937). Сягоньня (1941—1943). Не астыць нам (1944—1949). На ростанях. // Укладаньне, прадмова й біяграфічныя даведкі Барыса Сачанкі. Туга па радзіме: паэзія беларускай эміграцыі. — Мінск: Мастацкая літаратура, 1992, с. 10–169, Natallia Arsiennieva. Under the blue sky (1920-1925). Yellow Autumn (1927-1937). Today (1941-1943). We do not come down (1944-1949). At the crossroads. // Layout, introduction and biographical information by Barys Sačanka. Longing for homeland: poetry of the Belarusian emigration. Minsk: Маstackaja litaratura, 1992, p. 10-169, (in Belarusian)
- Яшчэ адна вясна: Выбраныя вершы [Another Spring: Selected Poems], Minsk, 1996 (in Belarusian)
- Выбраныя творы [Selected works], Minsk, 2002 (in Belarusian)

=== Plays ===
- Сваты [Matchmakers], 1955 (in Belarusian)

=== Libretto ===
- to Ščahloŭ's operas "The Forest Lake" («Лясное возера»), "Usiaslaŭ the Sorcerer" («Усяслаў Чарадзей»), in Belarusian
- to the operettas "From the Magic Land" («З выраю») and "Kupalle", in Belarusian
- words to the cantata "March" («Сакавік»), in Belarusian

=== Lyrics for hymns ===
- «Магутны Божа» ["Mahutny Boža (Almighty God)"], in Belarusian

=== Translations ===
- Hauptman's drama "The Sunken Bell"
- "Evangelical Christian Songbook"
- "Broken Jug" by Kleist
- libretto of the operas "The Marriage of Figaro" and "The Magic Flute" by Mozart, "The Freeshooter" by Weber, "Carmen" by Bizet and "The Gypsy Baron" by Strauss
- the text of the aria "Eugene Onegin" by Tchaikovsky
- introduction to Shakespeare's "Romeo and Juliet"
- chapters from "Dziady" (Forefathers’ Eve) and "Pan Tadeusz" by Mickiewicz
- "Song about the Bison" by Hussowczyk
- individual poems by Goethe
- Christmas carol “Silent Night”
