= Mikalay Shchahlou-Kulikovich =

Belarusian composer and musicologist

Mikałaj Ščahłow-Kulikovič
- Мікалай Шчаглоў-Куліковіч
- Born: October 13, 1896; Moscow, Russian Empire
- Died: March 31, 1969 (aged 72); Chicago, Illinois, U.S.
- Occupations: Cultural and social activist, composer, musicologist, researcher of Belarusian church and secular music

Mikalay Shchahlow-Kulikovich (Belarusian: Мікалай Шчаглоў-Куліковіч; (Note: or Nikolay Shcheglov-Kulikovich (Russian: Николай Щеглов-Куликович)) 13 October 1896 – 31 March 1969) was a cultural and social activist, composer and musicologist, researcher of Belarusian church and secular music.

== Biography ==
Kulikovich was born on October 13, 1896, in Moscow (according to other sources his date of birth is April 4 at the Smolensk Oblast). Born in the Orthodox Russian – Belarusian family, father's family came from the Don Cossacks and the mother from Smolensk. Since childhood, brought up by his maternal aunt, who was Abbess of the Orthodox Monastery in Tula. He sang in the church choir, where he revealed his musical abilities. He graduated from the Moscow Synodal School of Church Music, where he was influenced by the famous reformer of Russian church music Alexander Kastalsky. Prior to 1925 he studied at the Moscow Conservatory as a singer took part in the European tour.

In 1930 Kulikovich was engaged in collecting and studying Smolensk song folklore. For a time he lived in the Ukrainian SSR and from 1936 in Minsk. He worked as a music editor at the Belarusian Radio. Since 1937 he was the conductor of a symphony orchestra of the Belarusian Radio Committee. He was one of the organizers of the Opera and Ballet Theatre of Belarus. As musicology has worked with all-union magazine "Soviet Music".

During World War II Kulikovich lived in the occupied territories, from 1941 to 1942 he worked with continued collection of Belarusian folk song and music. Upon completion of the work in 1943 he published "Zbornіk kupalskіh i zhnіўnyh of Belarusian pesnyaў." He collaborated with the Belarusian editions Belaruskaya Gazeta, "Nova Way", and published a series of articles about the Belarusian musical culture. After the Belarusian Council of Churches, and recreation of the Belarusian Autocephalous Orthodox Church he was engaged in the reform of the Belarusian Orthodox Church music. In 1942 he prepared a study known as "Belarusian song." In 1944 Kulikovich participated in the Second All-Belarusian Congress, in the war years created the opera "Lyasnoe Vosera" (1942) and "Usyaslaў Charadzey" (1944) on a libretto by Natallia Arsiennieva.

Due to the advent of Soviet troops, along with Nicholas Rovenskii Kulikovich left Minsk. At first he lived in Germany, where he led the concert band and led the Belarusian Theater stage. In 1950 he moved to the United States, settling in Chicago. For 12 years, he led the chorus in the Greek-Catholic Church of Christ the Redeemer after his conversion to Catholicism. With the church choir he participated in ecumenical worship services, has collaborated with the Belarusian and Russian émigré publications ("Belarus", "New Russian Word"). Kulikovich was also songwriter and composed romances of Yanka Kupala, Maksim Bogdanovich, Dubovka Vladimir and Vladimir Vein. He compiled several collections of songs – "Belaruskіya pesennyya zbornіkі" (1954, 1955, 1960), "Kalyadoўshchykі" (1961) and "Rodnyya matyvy" (1967). Nicholass Kulikovich died on 31 March 1969 in Chicago.
