= Natalya Vasilyeva-Kachatkova =

Belarusian actress

- Born: June 24, 1948 (age 77)
- Occupation: Actress
- Awards: Honored Artist of Belarus; Badge of the Ministry of Culture of the Republic of Belarus

Natalya Vasilyeva-Kachatkova (born 24 June 1948, Moscow) is a Belarusian actress. She was awarded Honored Artist of Belarus in 1990.

== Biography ==
Vasilyeva-Kachatkova is a daughter of the prominent actors Matrona Kuzmenka and Rygor Kachatkov. In 1971, she graduated from the Belarusian State Academy of Arts as a drama and film actress and started her career in the Yanka Kupala National Academic Theatre.

On 13 August 2020, following the 2020 Belarusian presidential election, a violent crackdown of peaceful anti-government protests, beating and torture of detainees by riot police, the Yanka Kupala National Academic Theatre employees demanded to stop the violence and recalculate the votes in the presence of independent observers. On August 17, Pavel Latushko, general director of the theatre, was fired. On August 26, the majority of the theatre employees, including Natalia Vasilyeva-Kachatkova, resigned in protest.

== Theatrical work ==
Some of Natalia Kachatkova’s roles include:

- Adela (Merry - Not Grieve, a play by brothers Daletskiya and Mikhas Charot)
- Ruzana (Merry Road by Barys Vasilyev)
- Lusya (Lunatic’s Life by S. Zlotnikau)
- Malannya (Children of the Sun by Maxim Gorky)
- Pashlepkina (The Government Inspector by Nikolai Gogol)
- Dziana (Chicken by M. Kalyada)
- Fedra (Madness in Valencia by Lope de Vega)
- Golda (Commemorative Prayer based on Sholem Aleichem)
- Neryna (Unmarried Polygamist based on Moliere)
- Agata (Paulinka by Yanka Kupala)
- Kulina (Pinskaja Šliachta by Vintsent Dunin-Martsinkyevich)
- Weaver (Night before Christmas by Nikolai Gogol)
- Glushachykha (People in the Swamp by Ivan Melezh)
- Babulia (Shabany by Alhierd Baharevich)
- Elsa (Elsa's Land by Elena Ganum)

== Awards ==
1990 - Honored Artist of Belarus

2005 - Badge of the Ministry of Culture of the Republic of Belarus “For Contribution to the Development of Belarusian Culture”
