= Trasianka =

Mixed Belarusian–Russian language

Trasianka or trasyanka (Belarusian: трасянка, IPA: [traˈsʲanka]) is a mixed form of speech in which Belarusian and Russian elements and structures are combined arbitrarily. Due to the negative connotation of the word trasianka it has been suggested that in the linguistic debate the term "Belarusian-Russian mixed speech" should be used.

== Etymology ==
In Belarusian, the word means a kind of low quality fodder: hay is mixed with cut straw (unlike hay, straw has no nutritional value) by thoroughly shaking the mixture (shake: трасьці, traści) when the owner is low on hay supply. The word acquired the second meaning ("language mixture of low quality") relatively recently, in the second half of the 1980s, when a series of publications in the literary newspaper Literature and Art (Litaratura i mastactva) criticized developments in the use of the Belarusian language under Soviet rule. Zianon Pazniak is often said to be the one who has popularized the use of the word for the Belarusian-Russian language mixture. For the Belarusian-Russian borderland it has been reported that the phenomenon usually referred to by the term trasianka is called meshanka (mixed-up [language]) instead (this information is based on an interdisciplinary research carried out in the district of Horki and Drybin in 2004).

== History ==
=== Mixed speech in pre-Soviet and early Soviet era ===
In the area of present-day Belarus the mixing of speech has a relatively long history. This is because the Belarusian (and, similarly, Ukrainian) territories were for a long time borderlands in which local dialects contacted with closely related socially dominant languages (Polish, Russian). Whether such older forms of mixing Belarusian with Russian should be referred to as “trasianka” is arguable as there was no intergenerational transfer of speech in those times. A literary example for this kind of mixing can be found in the 19th-century play by Wincenty Dunin-Marcinkiewicz The Gentry of Pinsk (see the 1984 edition). Although it is a piece of art and not a record of everyday speech, it can be assumed that it reflects real language use (in certain situations with certain types of people) of that time. A first academic and journalistic debate on Belarusian-Russian mixed speech took place in the 1920s.

=== After World War II ===
The phenomenon referred to as “trasianka” since the 1980s had its origins in the fundamental socio-demographic changes which took place in Soviet Belarus after World War II, and in the eastern parts of Belarus partially already before World War II. The industrialization of Soviet Belarus led to a massive labor migration from villages to towns. While in 1959 31% of the population lived in towns, in 1990 the urban share had already reached 66%. At the same time ethnic Russians from other parts of the Soviet Union migrated to Soviet Belarus and, in many cases, took on leadership tasks in the Belarusian communist party, administration and state companies. Consequently, the language use of former Belarusian villagers - and new town dwellers - had to adapt from (mostly dialectal) Belarusian to standard Russian, a target which speakers seldom reached, however. As a result of this struggle for linguistic accommodation, the so-called trasianka in its contemporary form emerged, and, moreover, children of its speakers grew up using mixed Belarusian-Russian variety.

== Linguistic status ==
Due to the negative connotation of the word “trasianka” it has been suggested to abandon it in the linguistic debate and use the term “Belarusian-Russian mixed speech” instead. Scientific discussion on Belarusian-Russian mixed speech began in the first half of the 1990s. Influential Belarusian scholars have pointed out the spontaneous, individual, “piecemeal” or even “chaotic” fashion of Belarusian-Russian speech mixing. These ‘early’ debates were based mainly on informal observations though, due to a lack of text bodies in the mixed speech. A first empirical case study on the phenomenon has been undertaken only in the early 2000s in the capital Minsk. In the years 2008-2013 a research project carried out by linguists and social scientists at the University of Oldenburg (in cooperation with partners from the Belarusian State University in Minsk) has created two bodies of oral texts in the mixed speech . The linguistic results of the mentioned research project attested the older view that Belarusian-Russian mixed speech could yet not be classified as one relatively stable, homogenous fused lect all over Belarus. On the other hand, on all levels of the linguistic structure several country-wide relatively stable patterns could be observed which the mixed speech shares with one or both of its “donor” languages (Belarusian and Russian) or which, respectively, make the mixed speech differ from both donor languages. Russian elements and traits clearly dominate in the lexicon as well as in morphosyntax. The inflectional morphology is obviously a hybrid, and even the pronunciation is influenced by Russian. All in all, the Belarusian-Russian mixed speech in its current stage is classified as a complex of regional social dialects.

== Sociology of mixed speech use ==
The sociological and sociolinguistic component of the above-mentioned research project on mixed language use in Belarus showed, inter alia, the following results: Asked about their ‘native language’, roughly 38% of around 1200 respondents named the Belarusian-Russian mixed speech, 49% Belarusian and 30% Russian (more than one answer was allowed). As their ‘first language’ roughly 50% declared the mixed speech, 42% Russian and 18% Belarusian (again more than one answer was allowed). Finally, as their ‘primarily used language’ roughly 55% named Russian, 41% the mixed speech and 4% Belarusian. The results of the research project contradict the popular opinion that the use of Belarusian-Russian mixed speech is an indicator for a poor education level and a lack of proficiency in Russian or Belarusian standard language. The mixed speech is widespread among Belarusians from all educational levels and age groups and used alongside the standard language, which in most cases is Russian. The degree to which individuals tend to approximate ‘their’ mixed speech use to Russian or, respectively, to Belarusian depends on such factors as interlocutors, conversation place, topic etc. Among young Belarusians the relative weight of mixed speech use decreases in favour of Russian.

== Phonology ==
The phonology of Belarusian-Russian mixed speech is closer to Belarusian. From the point of view of the Russian speaker, the following distinctions are noticeable:

- presence of palatal affricate consonants [dz̪ʲ], [ts̪ʲ] instead of [dʲ], [tʲ], i.e. [ˈdz̪ʲenʲ] – дзень "day" – instead of [ˈdʲenʲ] день, [ˈts̪ʲixʲɪ] – цихий "quiet" – instead of [ˈtʲixʲɪj] тихий
- absence of palatalization of the consonant in front of [j], i.e. [ˈpjut] – пъют "(they) drink" – instead of [ˈpʲjʉt] пьют
- assimilative palatalization of the consonants, i.e. [ˈdz̪ʲvʲerɨ] – дзвери "doors" – instead of [ˈdvʲerʲɪ] двери
- aspirate [sʲ], i.e. [ˈsʲ^{ʰ}vʲatə] (сьвята "holiday"), [ˈʂɛsʲ^{ʰ}ts̪ʲ] (шесьть "six")
- “hard” hushing sibilants, [ʈ͡ʂ] as in Belarusian instead of [t͡ɕ] as in Russian, i.e. [ˈʈ͡ʂaʂkə] – чашка "cup" – instead of [ˈt͡ɕaʂkə]
- “hard” [r] instead of [rʲ], i.e. [ˈtrapkə] – трапка "rag" – instead of [ˈtrʲapkə] тряпка
- presence of non-syllabic bilabial [ʊ] in place of etymological (в) and (л) instead of Russian normative [l] at the end of the word, i.e. [ˈpraʊdə] – праўда "truth" – instead of [ˈpravdə] правда, [ˈvoʊk] – воўк "wolf" – instead of [ˈvolk] волк, [pʲɪˈsaʊ] – писаў "(he) wrote" – instead of [pʲɪˈsal] писал

== Vocabulary ==
Belarusian-Russian mixed speech mostly includes Russian words which have a Belarusian analogue shaped by Belarusian phonology and morphology. Some examples of high-frequency Russian words are (Belarusian and English translations are given in parentheses):

- Nouns: рабёнак (дзiця "child"), цвяточак (кветачка "flower"), дзеньгі (грошы "money")
- Verbs: работаць (працаваць "to work"), дзелаць (рабiць "to do"), ждаць (чакаць "to wait")
- Adjectives: прошлы (мiнулы "past"), следушчы (наступны "next"), красівы (прыгожы "beautiful"), плахі (дрэнны "bad")

Many words have Russian stem, but other morphemes come from Belarusian.

Professional and urban words are borrowed almost exclusively from Russian.

== Morphology ==
Inflection mostly conforms with the norms of the Belarusian language. Russian and Belarusian have different norms of declension, especially case declension. For instance, in the instrumental case in Russian masculine nouns ending in -а have inflection -ей, -ой, while in Belarusian the ending becomes -ам – the norm that is present in Belarusian-Russian mixed speech: гаварыла з Мишам, з Вовам ("spoke with Misha, with Vova").

Verbs in the 3rd person singular miss final -т, including verbs coming from Russian: атвячае ("(she) answers"), знае ("(she) knows"), таргуе ("(she) sells"). Sometimes, it is replaced with -ць: атвячаець, знаець, таргуець. In the infinitive form of Russian verbs final -ть is replaced with -ць: весіць ("to weight"), знаць ("to know").

Reflexive postfix -ся is more frequently used, even on words coming from the Russian vocabulary (Russian requires -сь): началася ("(she has) started"), баялася ("(she) was afraid"), прышлося ("had to"), спуталася ("become tangled"), учыліся ("(they) studied").

== See also ==
- Russification of Belarus
- Surzhyk, a similar phenomenon in Ukraine, a Ukrainian–Russian language mixture
- West Polesian language
- Languages of Belarus
- Lukashisms
