= Kudrychy =

Village in Brest Region, Belarus

Kudrychy Кудрычы (Belarusian)
- Village
- Location within Belarus
- Coordinates: 52°08′02″N 26°23′49″E
- Country: Belarus
- Region: Brest Region
- District: Pinsk District
- Time zone: UTC+3 (MSK)

Kudrychy or Kudrichi (Belarusian: Кудрычы, romanized: Kudryčy; Russian: Кудричи; Polish: Kudrycze) is a village in Pinsk District, Brest Region, Belarus. It is part of Kalavuravichy selsoviet.

It is located in the National Landscape Reserve of Middle Pripyat.

== Belarusian Venice ==
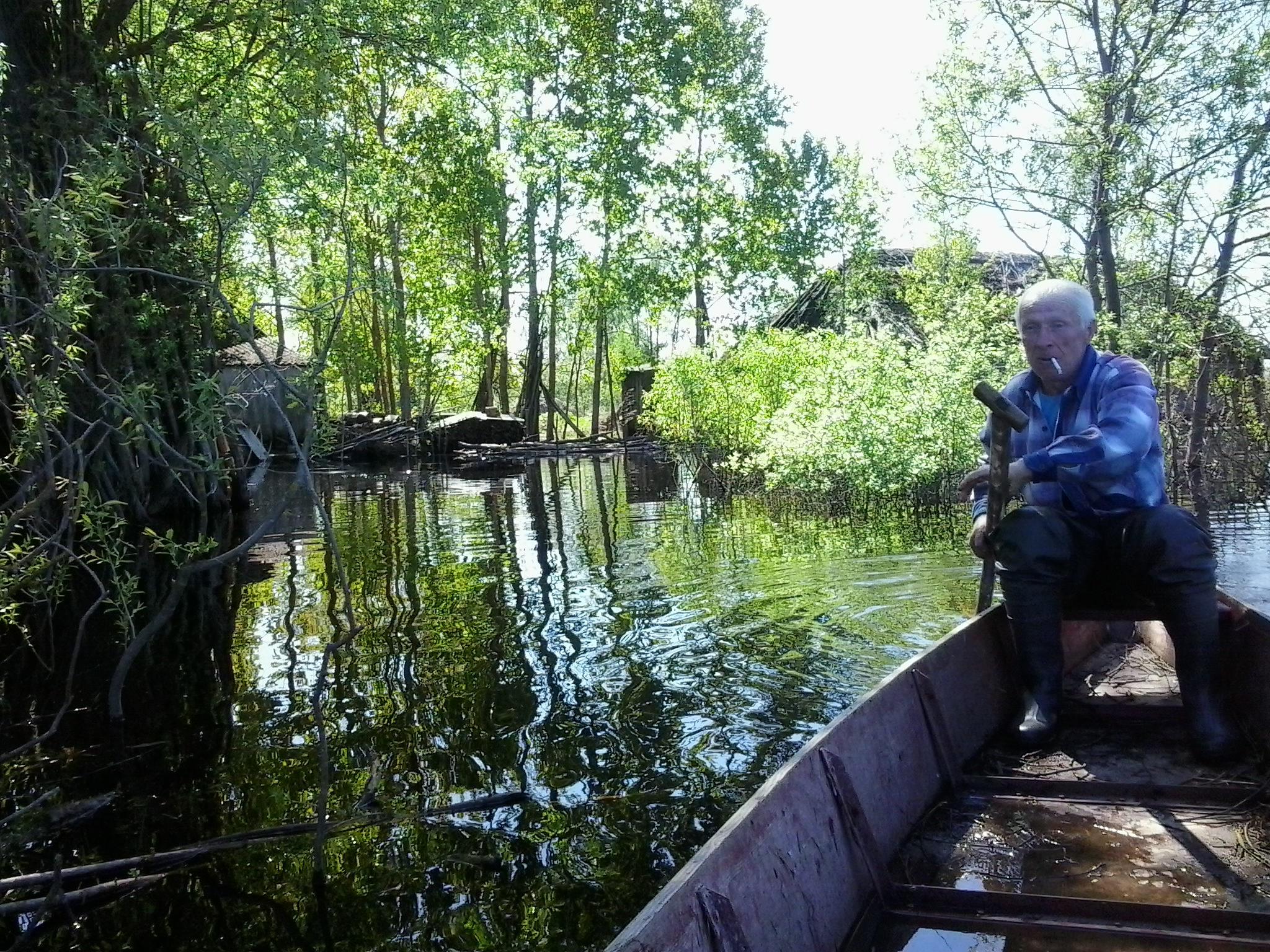
Local resident in a boat "seagull".

Kudrichi Polesie was hidden from the world by three rivers – Yaselda, Pina and Pripyat, as well as low-lying swamps. In the spring, during spills, Kudrichi floods so that local residents have to move from house to house by boats called “seagulls”, leading to its sobriquet, "Belarusian Venice".

Boats are more common than horses. Sometimes horses were transported by boats, as arable land was far away.

== Economy ==
The main occupations of Poleshuks were fishing, beekeeping and agriculture. They took their products by river to Pinsk, for sale.

== History ==
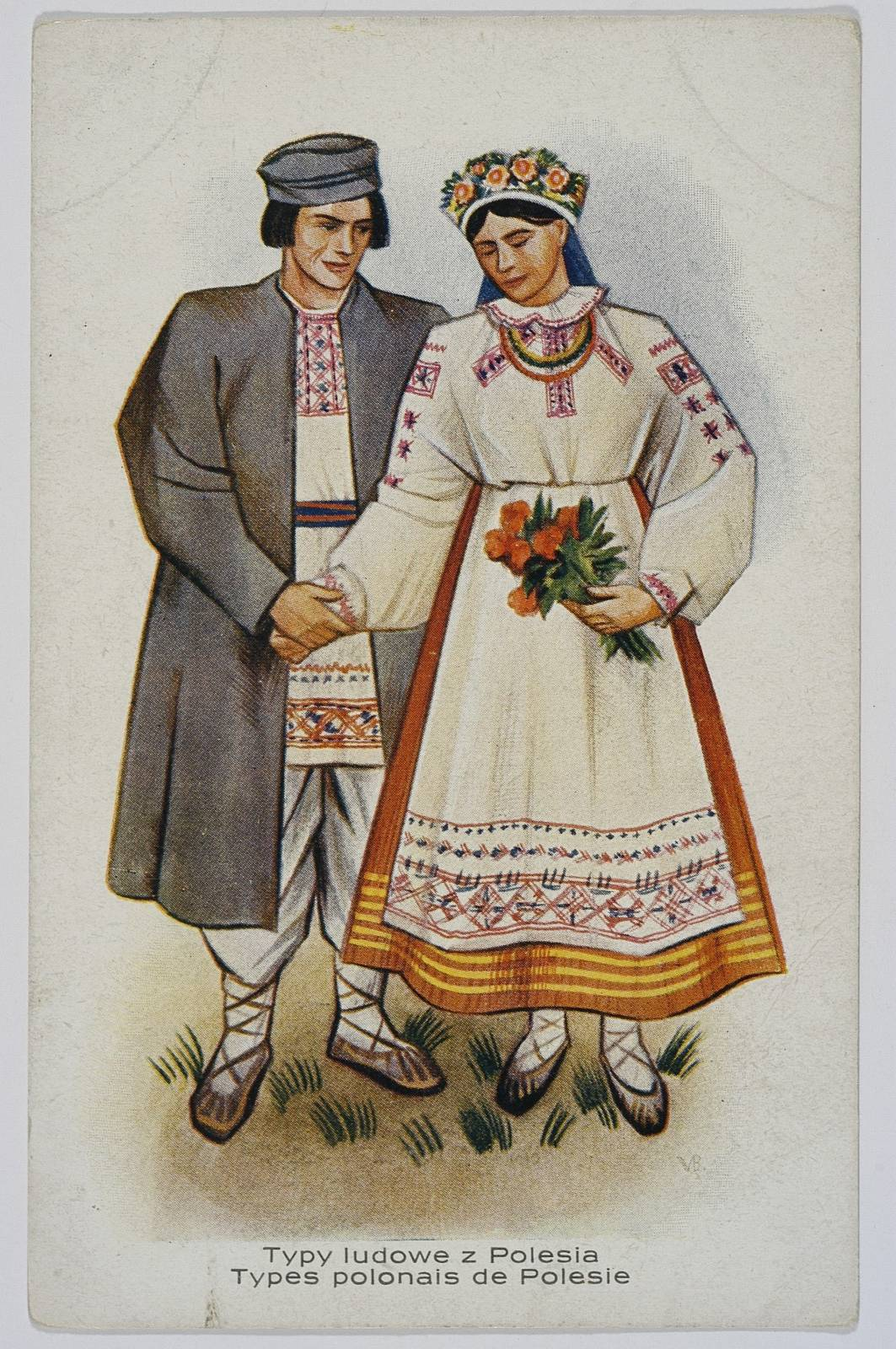
Poleshuks

When first mentioned in 1555, the lands were owned by Bona Sforza, and the settlement belonged to the Franciscan monastery in Pinsk. The village hosted 125 houses and only 10 inhabitants.

The village is thought to have been used as a place of exile for criminals or those who angered authorities, among many theories. After the construction of the road in the 1980s, the residents left.

=== “Polish province” by Louise Arner Boyd ===
The village was described by American traveler Louise Arner Boyd in 1934. Her expedition in the swamps to Pripyat led to the Belarusian village.

"Usually swamps are described as something extremely flat and monotonous, which I did not see here, because my main goal was only the locals... Living on the waterways or among them, create a kind of ethnic core that distinguishes these people from others".

As a result of her expedition, in 1937 in New York she published a photo album entitled Polish Province (Polish Countryside).

The village was left untouched by war due to its remote location. During the Second World War, German soldiers burned a neighboring village; Kudrichi was not touched for unknown reasons.

By order of Nikita Khrushchev, a tractor driver destroyed an 18th century church in the village.
