= Belarusian folk dance =

Ethnic dance of the Belarusian people

"Kryzhachok". From Belarusian Stamp (2000)

"Lyavonikha". Belarusian Stamp (2001)

Belarusian folk dance (Belarusian: Беларускі народны танец) is a Belarusian folk dance art, presented in the form of folk domestic or staged scenic dance. The history of Belarus and efforts to preserve Belarusian traditions have shaped the dances in use today, which have many ancient and archaic elements. These dances started to form in the 14th century, and originated in East Slavic rites. In the middle of the 19th century, traditional folk dancing began to merge with quadrilles and polkas from Western Europe.

The Belarusian folk dances are divided into three groups: illustrative, playful, and ornamental. Belarusian choreographer Larisa Aleksyutovich further subdivides Belarusian dances into the following genres:

- "actual" dances (traditional dances, quadrilles, polkas)
- folk dances
- circle dances
- games in the form of a dance

The concept of a "Belarusian folk dance" includes three components:

- authentic dance performed in everyday life
- staged folk dance
- ethnic dance

== History ==
The main characteristics of Belarusian dance emerged concurrently with the shaping of Belarus and its culture in the fourteenth through sixteenth centuries, with its roots dating back to ancient Russian culture. These dances have manifested the emotions, sentiments, and personality of the Belarusian people.

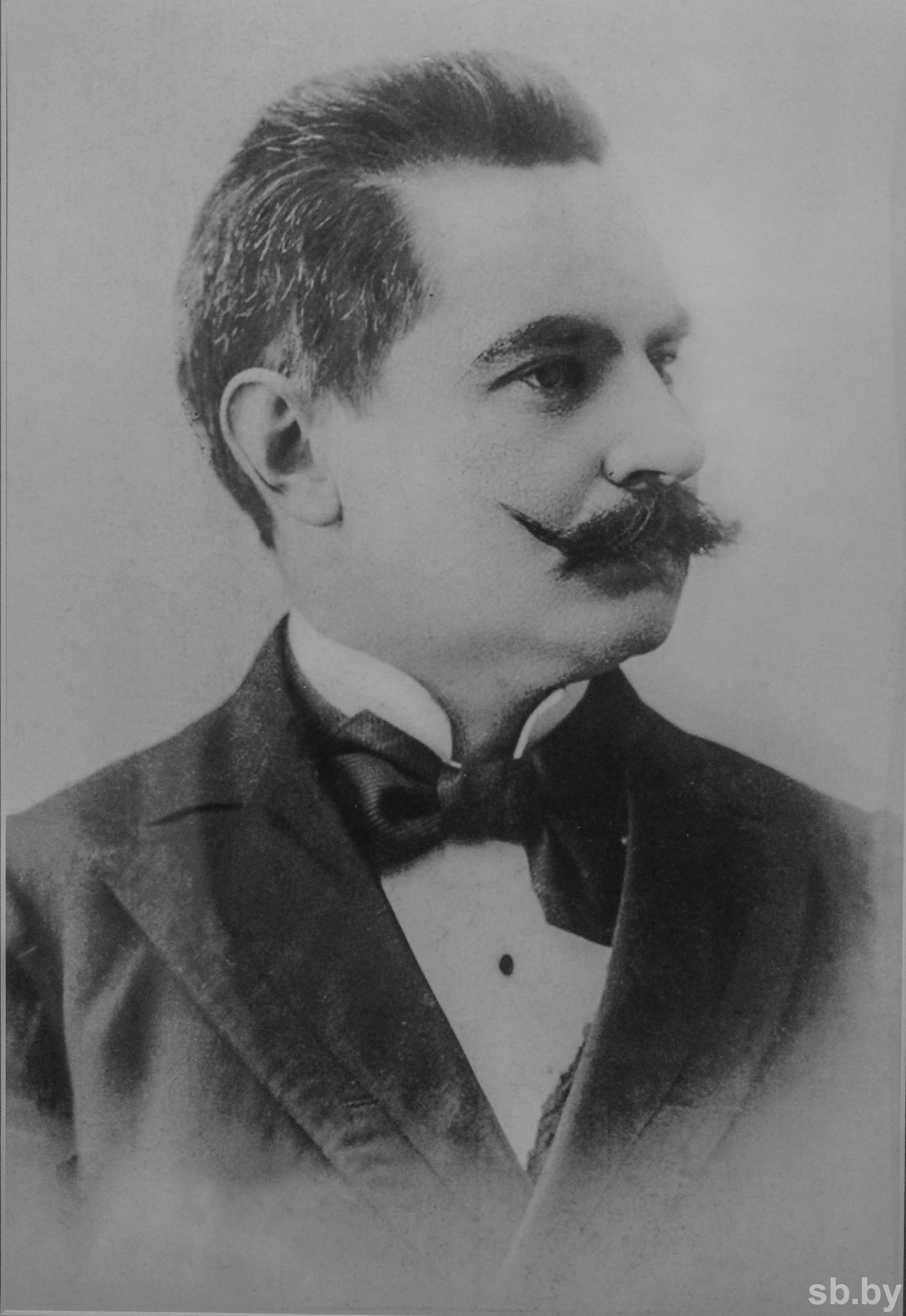
Ihnat Bujnicki

For a long time, Belarusian dance was little known, even in Belarus, and was rarely seen outside of small villages. Ihnat Bujnicki (Belarusian: Ігнат Буйніцкі, also sometimes spelled Ignatius Buinitsky) popularized Belarusian folk dances on both Belarusian and foreign stages with the creation of the Belarusian National Theatre in 1907. Bujnicki worked there as a director, actor, and dancer. The concerts featured folk songs, works of Belarusian poets, and dances accompanied by the traditional triple music of violins, cymbals, and bagpipes. Bujnicki's stage interpretations of folk dances closely followed their folklore basis.

Belarusian national choreography has preserved the rich artistic heritage of the past. The most popular Belarusian folk dances include "Lyavonikha", "Kryzhachok", "Yurachka", "Polka-Yanka", "Charot", "Taukachyki", "Chobaty", "Lyanok", "Kola", "Ruchniki", "Mlynok", "Kastsy", "Kozachka", "Myatselitsa", "Mikita", "Dudaryki", "Bychok", and "Kazyry".

The main characteristics of Belarusian dance are dynamism, cheerfulness, emotion, and group performance. Today, Belarusian folk dance is performed by numerous professional dance groups. The most famous troupes are the State Dance Company of Belarus, Khoroshki, and Lyavonikha.

== Classification ==
Traditionally, Belarusian dances are divided into three groups: illustrative dances, game dances, and ornamental dances.

- Illustrative dances (such as Metelitsa, Vorobei, Koza, Lenok, and Tolkachyki) feature salient performances by the lead dances; gestures and facial expressions play a prominent role.
- In game dances (such as Dzhigun, Magera, Repka, Pannochka, and Tsep), dancers try to achieve certain goals, which often requires chasing each other.
- In ornamental dances (such as Kryzhachok, Kola, Troyan, and Krutukha), certain geometric figures, which can often be identified from the title of the song, form the basis of the choreography.

Because the dances can have regional and stage variations, it is often difficult to determine which group a particular dance belongs to. Also, sometimes a dance can contain elements of more than one of these groups.

The various Belarusian folk dances can alternatively be classified as follows: circle dances, traditional dances, quadrilles, polkas, and urban folk dances.

=== Circle dances ===
The circle dance is one of the most ancient types of dance. Presumed to have appeared towards the end of the first millennium AD, these dances have diverse themes such as work, family life, love, and relationships.

Circle dances can have three components: song, playful ritual, and dance choreography. Depending on which component is most dominant, circle dances are divided into three main groups: the song dance, the playful dance, and the "regular" circle dance:

- The song dance has a simple choreographic structure, where the main figures are circles, lines, snakes, gates, and columns. The steps are usually simple, often without any link between the lyrics and the movements.
- The playful dance includes all three components but with a more complicated choreographic structure. There is often a change of rhythm from slow to fast and the lead dancers enrich the performance with jumps and whirling. Both facial expressions and gestures play a very important role.
- In the circle dance, as in the song dance, the connection between the lyrics and the movement is quite weak. The dance is the primary focus of this art, with lyrics as a mere musical accompaniment. Most often, these aren't accompanied by instrumental music.

Belarusian circle dances differ from each other in their choices of movements, images, and tempos.

=== Quadrille ===
The quadrilles represent a large group of Belarusian dances; these exist in various local versions such as Lusterka, Sher, Najnitsy, Lanskaya, and Smorgonskaya. The quadrille is of foreign origin, coming to Belarus in the middle of the nineteenth century. Many types of quadrilles have been recorded in different regions of Belarus: thick quadrilles (with a large number of dance couples), thin quadrilles (with only a few dance couples), and even some quadrilles that have as many as 40 couples.

=== Polka ===
Another group of Belarusian dances is the polkas, which are also characterized by a multitude of regional variations such as Trasukha, Yanka, Vyazanka, Shmorgalka, Drabney maku, and Usya-syusya. The polka is a dance of Czech origin. Although the polka is a borrowed dance, the Belarusian polka has had a great impact on the world's polka choreography. Many native Belarusian dances, such as the Trasukha, are derived from the polka.

=== Traditional folk dances ===
Traditional folk dances are characterized by the repetition of two or three dance figures and mass performance by an unlimited number of participants, often with musical accompaniment. These dances are most often performed by women, although this varies. The musical structures of traditional dances are distinguished primarily by the time signature of 2/4 and the squareness of the melodies. Moreover, the instrumental accompaniment of the dance often has the same modal and tonal basis as the circle dance song.

Another genre of Belarusian dance is formed by improvisational folk dances such as kazachok, Barynia, Kamarynskaya, Splyushka, and Shmel.

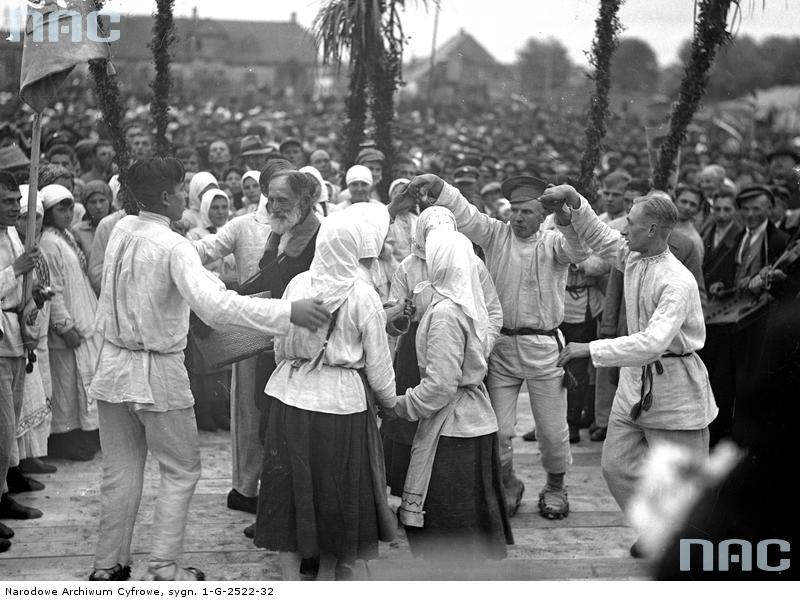
Dozhinki in Belarus (1934). Belarusian dance

Lyavonikha is the most popular dance in Belarus, and it is a traditional dance. It vividly expresses the soul and culture of the people. The dance is done in a group of arbitrary size, broken up by couples. Its musical accompaniment is a song of the same name. The dance is based on free, quick, but easy movements.

Kryzhachok is also a very popular dance. The origin of the dance's name might derive from the name of a wild drake: "kryzhak". The dance itself is described as imitating the movements of birds. Kryzhachok is an ornamental, group partner dance, performed by any number of couples at a fast pace.

Each Belarusian folk dance has its own group of movements, its own musical accompaniment, and its own rhythmic pattern. Many Belarusian folk dances are also distinguished by their plot. Through dance movements, the performer talks about his life, his work, or his attitude to nature.

== Choreography ==
Belarusian dance has peculiar movements that incorporate complex compositional techniques. Each dance has its own musical accompaniment and its own rhythmic pattern.

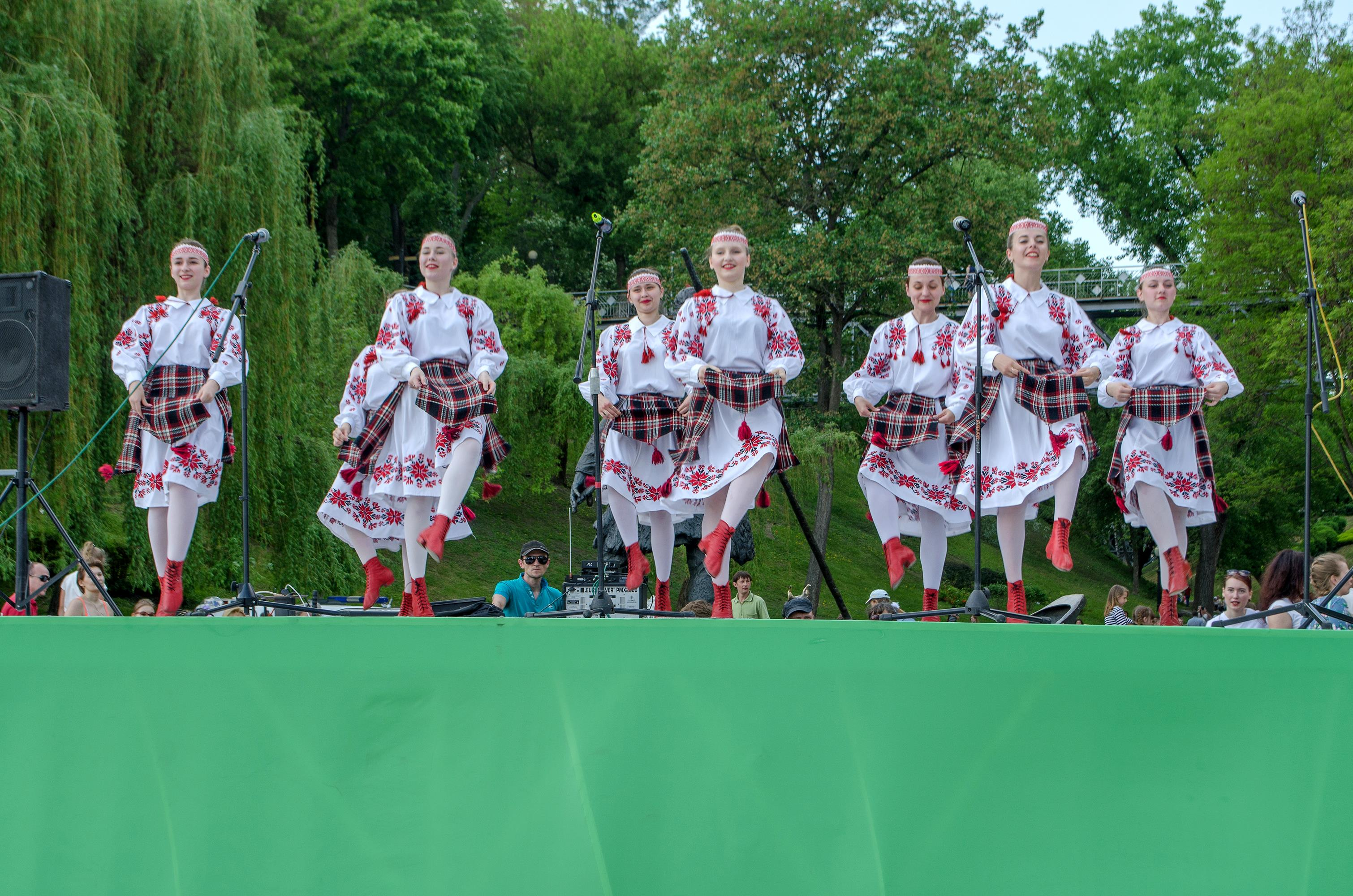
Belarusian dance

Hand movements accompany the dances, helping to convey the mood. These hand movements strengthen the artistic content of the dance.

Belarusian dances often have a plot, and have a certain amount of theater and acting.

== Musical accomplishments ==
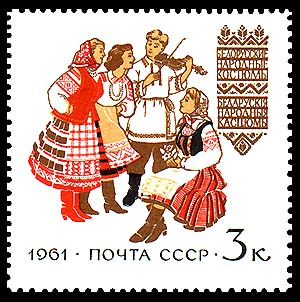
USSR Stamp (1961)

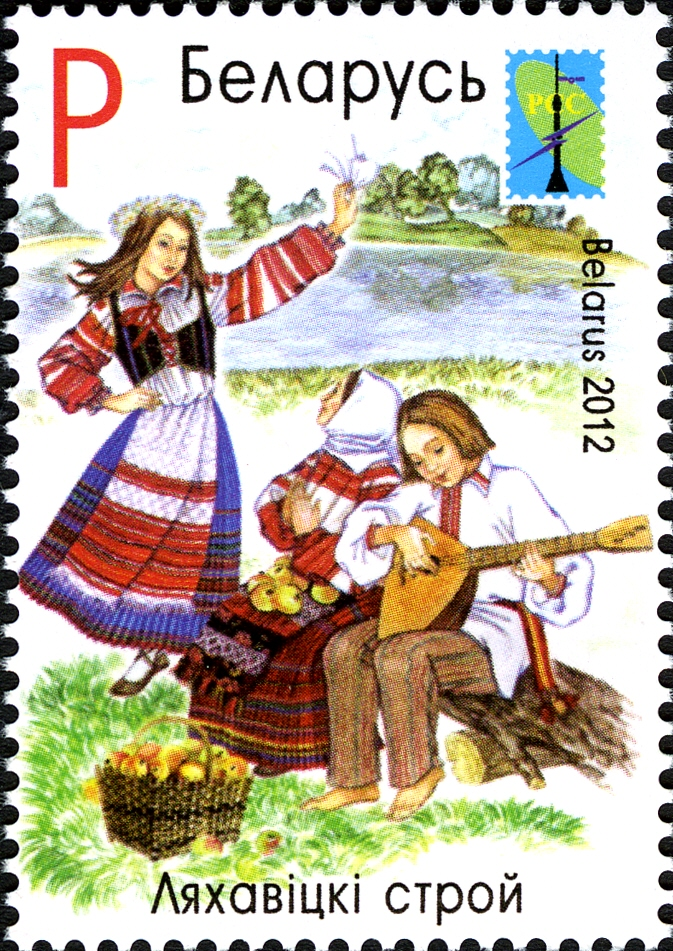
Belarusian Stamp (2012)

Belarusian folk dance music has a colorful, simple melody. Musical instruments, such as violin, tambourine, accordion, and cello are used. Ancient Russian harps and the bagpipe have also been popular.

Often, dances arose as a musical accompaniment to certain songs or games. In these cases, the name of the dance can be the same as the name of the song. Examples of dances based on certain songs are Lyavonikha, Tolkachiki, and Shestak.

== Learning how to dance ==
Many ethnic and folklore books mention Belarusian dances, but these sources provide very little information about the choreography. Therefore, it is considered important to document this information before it is lost irretrievably.

== Staged folk dance ==
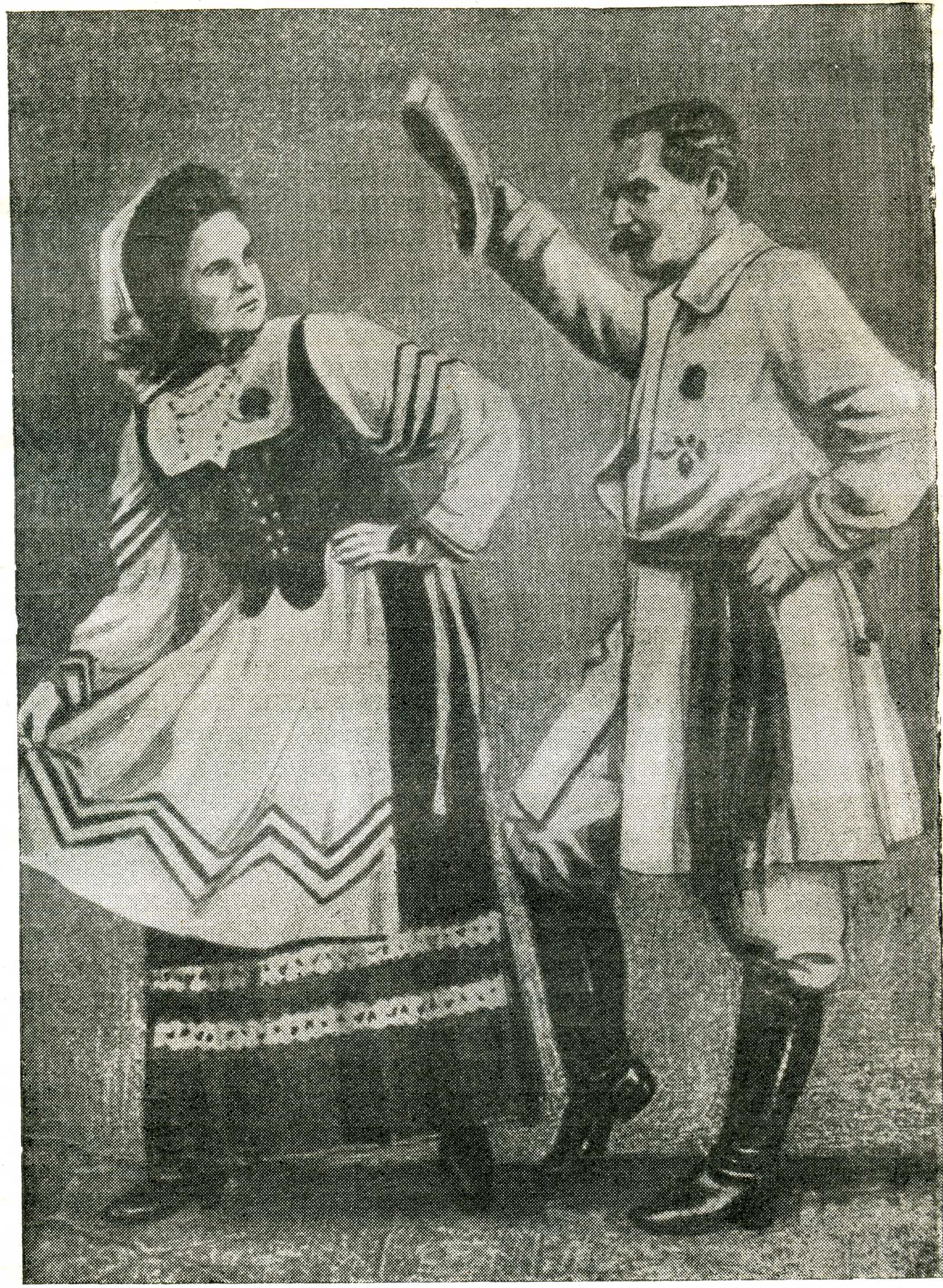
Ihnat Bujnicki dances with his daughter Elena

In 1862, the first Belarusian comic opera Peasant incorporated the folk dance "Metelitsa". This was the first example of the use of Belarusian folk dance in theater.

Ihnat Bujnicki, who founded the Belarusian National Theatre in 1907, played a major role in the emergence of stage folk dance. His repertoire included more than a dozen dances. Bujnicki leveraged his powers of creative observation and his great musical talent to accurately capture the style of the dances. He created a bright, dynamic, folklore-faithful representation that originated the national ballet.

In 1933, the opera and ballet theater opened in Minsk. The national choreography was created here by combining the elements of dance folklore with classical ballet.

Later, a large number of theater and dance groups, including amateur ones, began performing folk dances. This contributed to the development and diversity of the stage dance, enriching it with new technical movements and compositional elements.

Belarusian choreographers such as K. Oleksyutovich, K. Muller, L. Lyashenko, I. Hvorost, and N. Chistyakov made great contributions to the development of stage folk dance.

== In culture ==
Folk dances are an integral part of the Belarusian culture and way of life, and these dances have been repeatedly mentioned in Belarusian literature. For example, in the 19th century Belarusian poem "Taras on Parnassus", the characters not only talk about dancing but also dance themselves.

S. Byadulia took notice of how flowers and Belarusian folk costume richly decorate Belarusian dance.

Russian composer Alexander Glazunov used Belarusian melodies in his work.
