= Languages of Belarus =

- Official: Belarusian and Russian
- Minority: Polish, Ukrainian, Yiddish, Trasianka
- Foreign: English
- Signed: Russian Sign Language
- Keyboard layout: Belarusian keyboard

The official languages of Belarus are Belarusian and Russian.

The three most widespread linguistic codes in modern Belarus are Belarusian, Russian and the Belarusian-Russian mixed speech commonly called "Trasianka".

== History ==
The earliest known documents from ethnic Belarusian territories date from the 12th century. Most of them are saints' vitae and sermons written in the Church Slavonic language. In the 13th and 14th century an increasing number of texts, mainly official records and other types of documents, show phonetic, grammatical and lexical characteristics regarded as typically Belarusian. There is an ongoing scientific discussion about the share of elements from, on one hand, Church Slavonic, on the other hand from autochthonous East Slavonic vernaculars in early East Slavonic texts. In general, however, it can be said that these shares depended on text genres and their evaluation as "high" or "low": In "high" - mainly religious - text genres Church Slavonic prevailed, while in "low" text genres - texts of an everyday nature - the influence of East Slavonic vernaculars dominated.

In the late 14th and in the 15th century the Church Slavonic religious writings in East Slavonic territories underwent an archaization known as "rebulgarisation". The purpose of this archaization was to counteract the "falsification" of the divine word which allegedly had been caused by the influence of vernaculars. Rebulgarisation made Church Slavonic even less comprehensible to the population at large than it already was due to its complex syntax structures and its high share of abstract lexicon. This and the political rise of the Grand Duchy of Lithuania with its Slavic majority population contributed to the emergence of a written language on an autochthonous East Slavonic basis. This language emerged as a Koiné language from vernaculars bordering the administrative centers of the Grand Duchy. It was the official language of the Grand Duchy of Lithuania and was used in particular by the authorities, in offices and in diplomatic correspondence, but in the course of time it entered former "exclusive" domains of Church Slavonic as well. In contemporary sources it was referred to as "ruskij jazyk", which serves pro-Russian linguistic historiography as an argument to claim it as a part of the history of the Russian language. On the other hand, pro-Belarusian linguistic historiography claims "ruskij jazyk" as "Old Belarusian language" ("starabelaruskaja mova"), which is problematic as well insofar as at that time no distinct Belarusian identity in today's sense of the term had evolved. Apart from that the term Ruthenian language is in use, although the latter often refers only to the southern (from today's perspective: Ukrainian) variant of the state language of the Grand Duchy of Lithuania.

After the Union of Lublin and the Union of Brest the influence of Polish language and culture in the Grand Duchy of Lithuania increased at the cost of Ruthenian, the use of which in official documents of the Grand Duchy was forbidden in 1696. Subsequently, linguistic elements of Belarusian were perpetuated mainly in vernaculars and folklore passed on by word of mouth. After the Partitions of Poland initially Polish remained the social dominant language in Belarus being more and more replaced in this role by Russian, in particular after the November Uprising.

As part of the movement of Romanticism in the 19th century poets and intellectuals with origin from today's Belarus were inspired by the language use of the peasantry and contributed to a new basis for a modern Belarusian literary language, which was only partly connected to the official language of the Grand Duchy of Lithuania. The language policy of the Russian Empire treated Belarusian as a dialect of Russian. After the January Uprising of 1863, in which Belarusians participated as well, all - for the time being tentative - steps toward a Belarusian linguistic and cultural emancipation were blocked by the authorities.

The efforts for the creation of a modern Belarusian literary language intensified after the liberalizations following the 1905 Russian Revolution when inter alia the ban on printed texts in Belarusian was lifted. A fundamental role for the development of literary norms in modern Belarusian played the newspaper Nasha Niva (published 1906-1915), contributors of which were the leading intellectuals of the Belarusian national movement at that time. As a school subject and language of instruction Belarusian was first introduced under German occupation in the district Ober Ost, which existed from 1915 to 1918.

According with the principles of Lenin's nationality policy in the early years of the Byelorussian Soviet Socialist Republic (BSSR), i.e. in the 1920s, a policy was carried out which aimed at the Belarusization of public life as well as at the terminological development of the Belarusian language. In the early 1930s Soviet state and party leaders began their ideological struggle against alleged "local nationalisms", putting an end to Belarusization and resulting in grave repressions and physical elimination of the pro-Belarusian intelligentsiya in the 1930s and 1940s. In 1934 Russian was declared language of interethnic communication for the whole territory of the Soviet Union, and in 1938 Russian was introduced as an obligatory subject in all schools in non-Russian Soviet republics. In West Belarus, which in the inter-war period was part of the Polish territory, policy aimed at a long-term assimilation of Belarusians through the medium of Polish education and the influence of the Catholic Church.

Of great importance for the development of the linguistic situation in the decades after World War II were the industrialisation and urbanization of the BSSR, part of which became the Western Belarusian territories formerly belonging to Poland. For the first time Belarusians became the majority population in the urban centers, in which Russian, Jewish and Polish influences had prevailed before World War II. At the same time the BSSR became the Soviet republic with the highest share of immigrants from the Russian Soviet Federative Socialist Republic (RSFSR). Specialists from the RSFSR as well as other Russian-speaking "non-Belarusians" often held leadership positions in the post-war BSSR, thus contributing to the role of Russian as the language of social advance. This caused migrants from the Belarusian countryside to the cities to give up their dialectal Belarusian and adjust to the Russian-speaking environment. This way the Belarusian-Russian mixed speech trasianka spread and was perpetuated to the following speaker generation. A law passed by the Supreme Soviet of the BSSR in 1959 allowed pupils taught in schools with Russian as medium of instruction to opt out of Belarusian as a school subject. In 1978 the Council of Ministers of the Soviet Union decided to introduce Russian as a school subject already in all first grades of "non-Russian" schools, thus further weakening the position of Belarusian.

At the time of perestroika an improvement of the legal and actual status of the Belarusian language became an important demand of the nationally orientated intelligentsiya, which began to organize itself in the Belarusian Popular Front and, with a narrower focus on language, the Frantsishak Skaryna Belarusian Language Society. Under the pressure of this "national rebirth" movement in 1990 the Supreme Soviet of the BSSR passed a language law which declared Belarusian the sole official language of the BSSR.

== Development since the dissolution of the Soviet Union ==
After the dissolution of the Soviet Union in December 1991 the Belarusian language law remained in force, and a Belarusization policy was initiated which aimed at linguistic Belarusization of the most important areas of public life within ten years. Particular attention was drawn to the educational system. This policy, however, was rejected by large parts of the society, and this prompted Alexander Lukashenko to take up the issue of allegedly "forceful Belarusization" in his first presidential campaign in 1994. After being elected, in 1995 Lukashenko initiated a controversial referendum in which according to official data 88.3% of the participants supported an equal status for the Russian and Belarusian language. The revised language law names Russian in addition to Belarusian as official language of Belarus. Following the referendum, the policy of discrimination in favor of Belarusian came to an end, as according to the revised language law in all substantial domains of public life either Russian or Belarusian could be used. Due to the long-lasting dominance of Russian in Belarus this legal "equality" of the two official languages in fact resulted in an almost exclusive use of the Russian language in public life, except for few niches. In particular in the second half of the 1990s and the first half of the 2000s the public use of Belarusian outside the spheres of education and culture became a symbol of an oppositional ("Anti-Lukashenko") attitude. This was reinforced by some disrespectful statements Lukashenko made about the Belarusian language. In light of several political and economic conflicts with Russia since the middle of the 2000s and, more recently, the role of Russia in the war in Donbas, Belarusian officials have started to use a more favourable rhetoric with respect to the Belarusian language. However, this has not resulted in a fundamental change of the actual language policy in Belarus.

In the Belarusian population censuses of 1999 and 2009 respondents were asked about their native language and about the language they usually speak at home. In 1999 85.6% of the citizens with Belarusian nationality declared Belarusian, 14.3% declared Russian as their native language, in 2009 these shares were 60.8% for Belarusian and 37.0% for Russian. As language they usually speak at home in 1999 41.3% of Belarusians declared Belarusian, 58.6% Russian, in 2009 these shares were 26.1% for Belarusian and 69.8% for Russian. A recent research project at the University of Oldenburg has pointed out the unreliability of the language-related questions in the Belarusian censuses and included in its own surveys "Belarusian-Russian mixed language" (commonly known as "trasianka") as an answer variant in addition to Russian and Belarusian. Moreover, multiple answers were allowed. Asked about their native language, around 49% of Belarusians chose Belarusian, 38% trasianka and 30% Russian. As language(s) of their first socialization, around 50% of Belarusians named trasianka, 42% Russian and 18% Belarusian. As language predominantly used - in this category multiple answers were not allowed - 55% of the respondents with Belarusian national identity chose Russian, 41% trasianka and 4% Belarusian.

The number of first graders who were taught in Belarusian significantly decreased, such as in the capital Minsk where this fell from 58.6% in 1994 to 4.8% in 1998, and by 2001, most major cities had no schools where its pupils were instructed in Belarusian, while the capital Minsk still had 20 Belarusian-language schools. None of the universities in Belarus provide Belarusian-language education and Belarusian language lessons in schools are declining. In 2016, only 13% of pupils in Belarus attended elementary schools where the language of instruction was Belarusian. The annual circulation of Belarusian language literature also significantly decreased from 1990 to 2020: magazines (from 312 mil to 39.6 mil), books and brochures (from 9.3 mil to 3.1 mil).

Apart from Russian, Belarusian and trasianka the languages of national minorities are used in Belarus, but to a much lesser extent. According to the Belarusian census of 2009 the overwhelming majority of non-Belarusians use Russian in their everyday life.

2009 Census: Language normally spoken at home, % of population in respective ethnic group
| Ethnicity | Population, thousands of people | Belarusian | Russian |
|---|---|---|---|
| Total | 9,504 | 23.4 | 70.2 |
| Belarusians | 7,957 | 26.1 | 69.8 |
| Russians | 785 | 2.1 | 96.5 |
| Poles | 295 | 40.9 | 50.9 |
| Ukrainians | 159 | 6.1 | 88.4 |
| Jews | 13 | 2.0 | 95.9 |

Languages of Belarus according to 2009 census (green - Belarusian, blue - Russian)
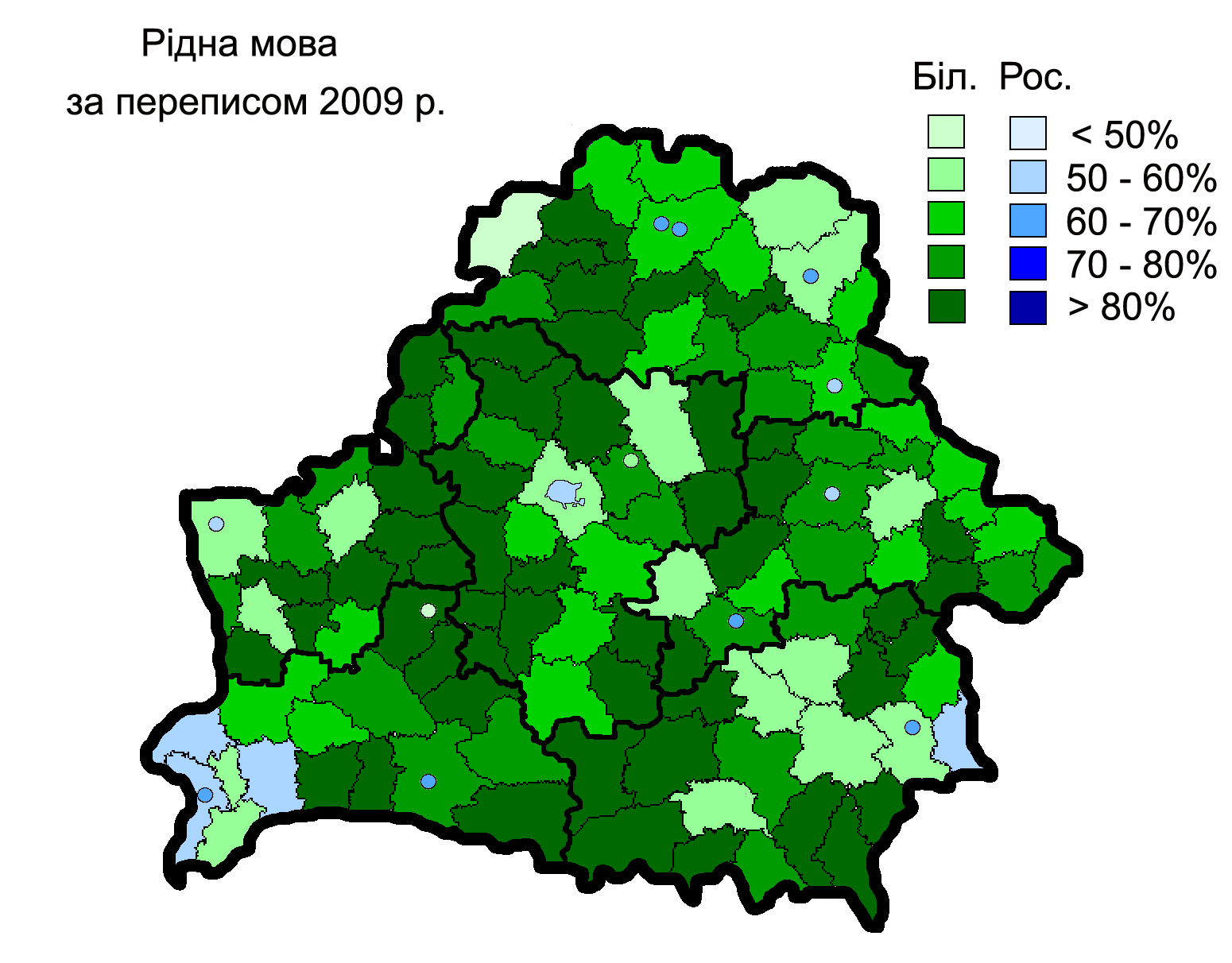
Native languages

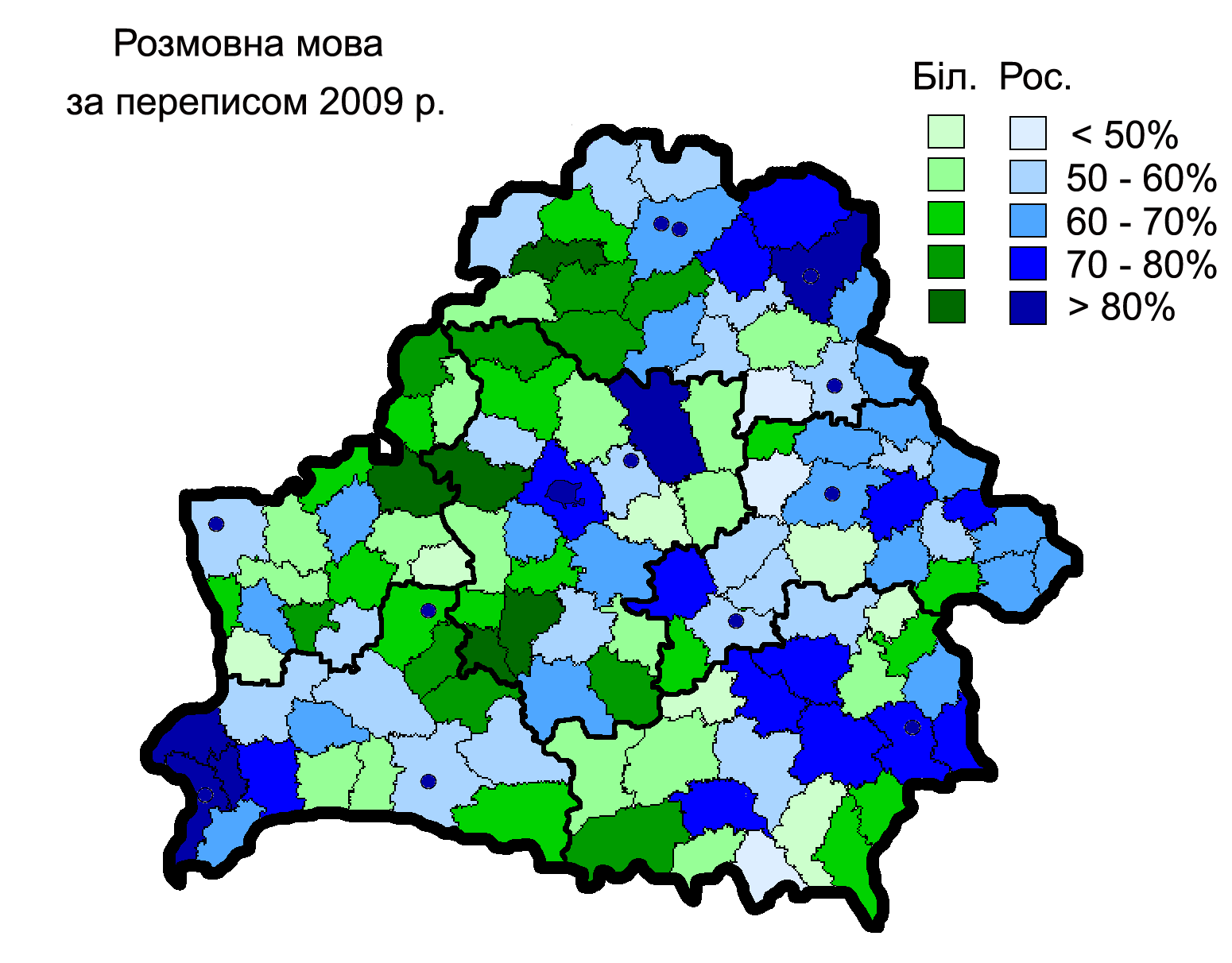
Spoken languages

2019 Census: Language normally spoken at home, % of population in respective ethnic group
| Ethnicity | Population, thousands of people | Belarusian | Russian |
|---|---|---|---|
| Total | 9,413 | 26 | 71.3 |
| Belarusians | 7,990 | 28.5 | 71 |
| Russians | 706 | 2.5 | 97.2 |
| Poles | 287 | 46 | 52.4 |
| Ukrainians | 159 | 6.5 | 89 |
| Jews | 13 | 2.1 | 96.6 |

== Knowledge of Belarusian and Russian languages by region and Minsk City ==
Source: Belstat Census 2009

Population classified by knowledge of the Belarusian and Russian languages by region and Minsk City (thousand)
| Entity | All population | Of total population persons who indicated as | | | | | |
| Entity | All population | Mother tongue | | Language normally spoken at home | | Other language they have good knowledge of | |
| Entity | All population | Belarusian | Russian | Belarusian | Russian | Belarusian | Russian |
|---|---|---|---|---|---|---|---|
| Republic of Belarus | 9503.8 | 5058.4 | 3948.1 | 2227.2 | 6673.0 | 1281.7 | 1305.4 |
| Brest Region | 1401.2 | 751.9 | 597.4 | 374.2 | 982.4 | 209.6 | 236.1 |
| Vitebsk Region | 1230.8 | 646.8 | 543.7 | 276.1 | 900.8 | 207.7 | 176.9 |
| Gomel Region | 1440.7 | 786.4 | 602.8 | 326.4 | 1037.6 | 154.8 | 166.5 |
| Grodno Region | 1072.4 | 634.7 | 386.9 | 375.9 | 606.1 | 145.6 | 230.4 |
| Minsk City | 1836.8 | 645.9 | 966.0 | 106.1 | 1508.7 | 321.6 | 54.3 |
| Minsk Region | 1422.5 | 987.2 | 390.5 | 553.0 | 796.6 | 127.4 | 343.9 |
| Mogilev Region | 1099.4 | 605.5 | 460.8 | 215.5 | 840.8 | 115.0 | 97.3 |

In Belarus on the whole 70.21% of the population indicated they speak Russian at home, 23.43% indicated Belarusian, 3.13% did not indicate a language, 1.51% indicated Trasianka, 1.47% indicated several languages and the remaining 0.23% indicated another language. The area where Belarusian is used the least at home is Minsk City (6% of people) while the area where it is used the most is the Minsk region (39% of people; note that Minsk region administratively excludes the city of Minsk).

2019 Census: Population classified by knowledge of the Belarusian and Russian languages by region and Minsk City (thousand)
| Entity | All population | Of total population persons who indicated as | | | |
| Entity | All population | Mother tongue | | Language normally spoken at home | |
| Entity | All population | Belarusian | Russian | Belarusian | Russian |
|---|---|---|---|---|---|
| Republic of Belarus | 9413.4 | 5094.9 | 3983.8 | 2447.8 | 6718.6 |
| Brest Region | 1348.1 | 1037.7 | 270.5 | 218.7 | 1103.0 |
| Vitebsk Region | 1135.7 | 514.0 | 585.6 | 142.8 | 965.6 |
| Gomel Region | 1388.5 | 652.7 | 693.7 | 201.1 | 1156.3 |
| Grodno Region | 1026.8 | 559.9 | 427.8 | 389.1 | 616.7 |
| Minsk City | 2018.3 | 982.1 | 980.1 | 689.1 | 1292.6 |
| Minsk Region | 1471.2 | 876.1 | 548.3 | 549.6 | 884.6 |
| Mogilev Region | 1024.8 | 472.4 | 477.7 | 257.2 | 698.9 |
