= Pinsk district =

District of Brest region, Belarus

Pinsk district Пінскі раён (Belarusian) Пинский район (Russian)
- District
- Flag Coat of arms

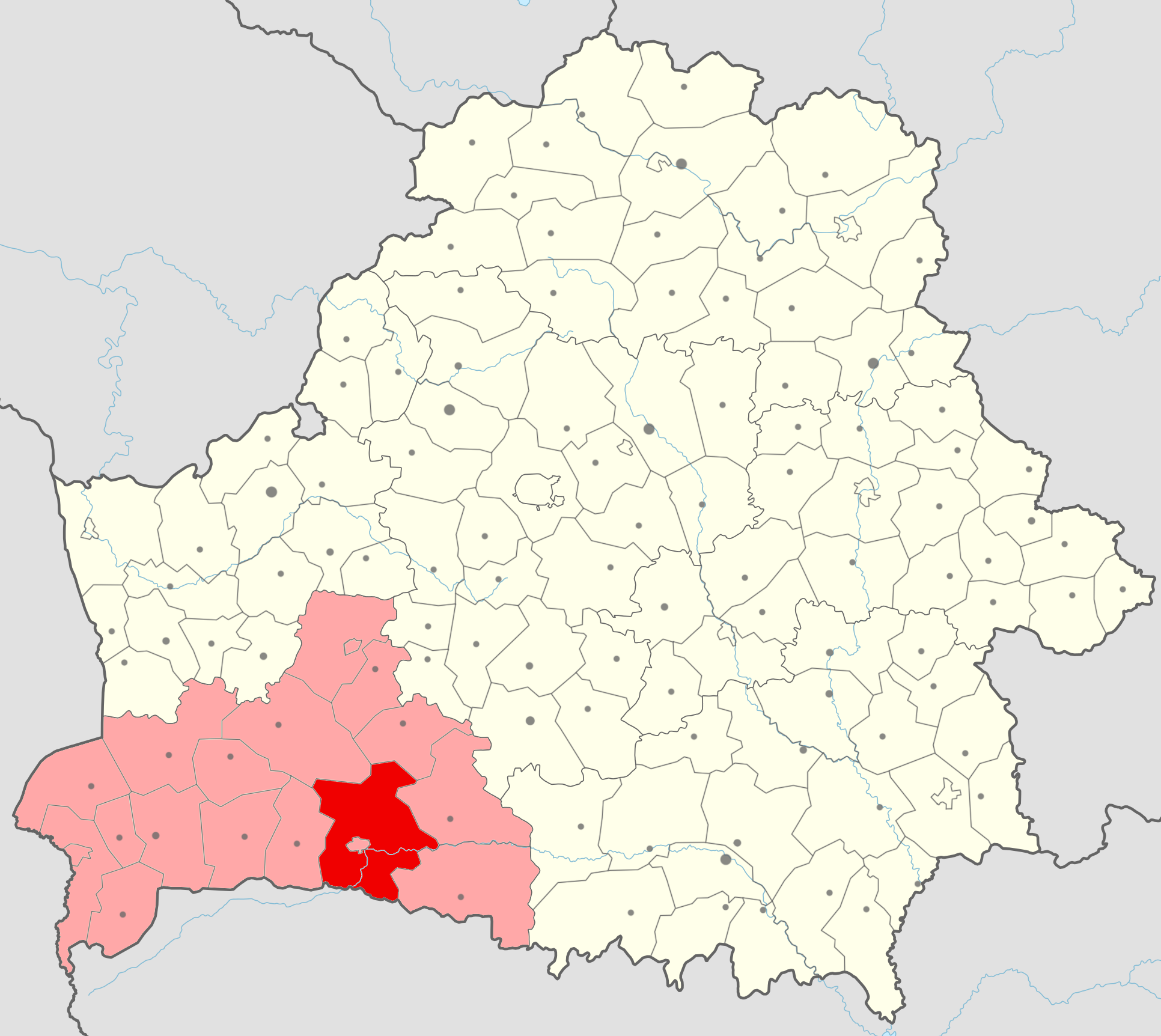
- Coordinates: 52°07′30″N 26°05′09″E
- Country: Belarus
- Region: Brest region
- Administrative center: Pinsk

Area
  - District: 3,252.77 km^{2} (1,255.90 sq mi)

Population (2024)
  - District: 40,741
  - Density: 12.525/km^{2} (32.440/sq mi)
  - Urban: 1,773
  - Rural: 38,968
- Time zone: UTC+3 (MSK)
- Website: pinsk.brest-region.gov.by

Pinsk district (Belarusian: Пінскі раён, romanized: Pinski rajon; Russian: Пинский район, romanized: Pinsky rayon) is a district (raion) of Brest region in Belarus. Its administrative center is Pinsk, which is administratively separated from the district. As of 2024, it has a population of 40,741.

== Demographics ==
At the time of the 2009 Belarusian census, Pinsk district had a population of 51,997. Of these, 92.2% were of Belarusian, 2.6% Russian, 2.6% Ukrainian and 1.6% Polish ethnicity. 70.7% spoke Belarusian and 26.0% Russian as their native language. In 2023, it had a population of 41,168.

== Pinsk district in literature ==
Pinskaja Šliachta [Pinsk Nobility] by Vintsent Dunin-Martsinkyevich (1866)

== Notable residents ==
- Raman Skirmunt (1868, Parečča village – 1939), politician, supporter of the Belarusian independence movement
