= Ice hockey in Belarus =

- Country: Belarus
- Governing body: Belarus Ice Hockey Federation
- National team(s): Men's national team; Women's national team

National competitions
- Belarusian Extraliga

Ice hockey in Belarus is governed by the Belarus Ice Hockey Federation. Belarusian men's and junior national teams participated at the IIHF World Championships. Belarus has been a member of the International Ice Hockey Federation (IIHF) since May 6, 1992.

The national hockey team finished fourth at the 2002 Salt Lake City Olympics following an upset win over Sweden in the quarterfinals, and regularly competed in the World Championships. The Belarusian Extraliga was founded in 1992. Numerous Belarusian players are present in the Kontinental Hockey League in Eurasia, particularly for Belarusian club HC Dinamo Minsk, and several have also played in the National Hockey League in North America.

Due to the 2022 Russian invasion of Ukraine, the IIHF banned all Belarusian national and club teams from its events indefinitely, and Hockey Canada banned Belarus’s "participation in events held in Canada that do not fall under the IIHF’s jurisdiction."
