= Ihnat Bujnicki =

Belarusian actor and theatre director

- Ігнат Буйніцкі
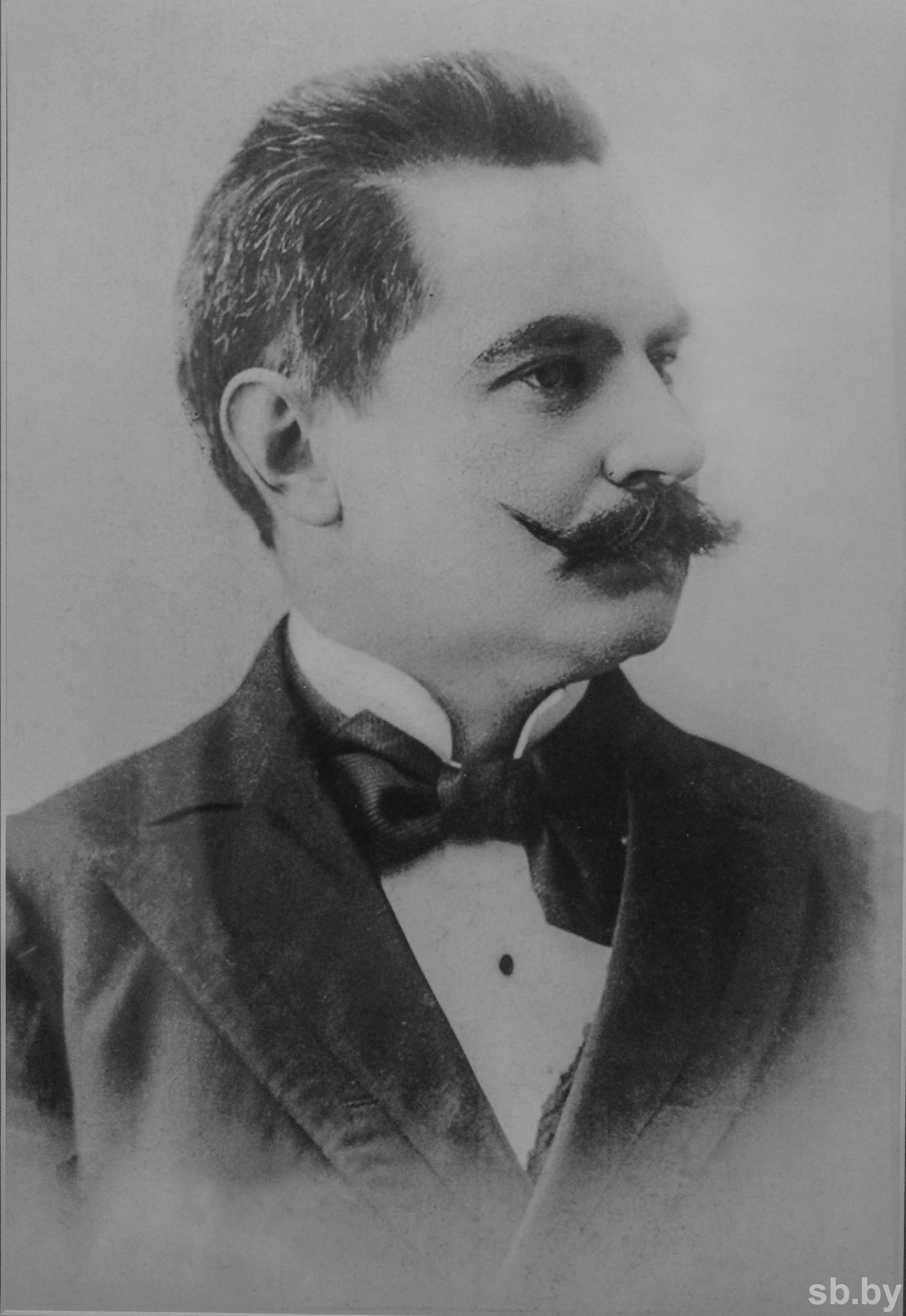
- Born: August 22, 1861 the estate of Palivačy, Russian Empire
- Died: September 22, 1917 (aged 56); Haradok, Belarus
- Occupation(s): actor and theatre director
- Known for: described as “the father of the Belarusian theatre”

Ihnat Bujnicki (also known as Ignat Buynitsky, Belarusian: Ігнат Буйніцкі; 22 August 1861 – 22 September 1917) was an actor and theatre director, described as “the father of the Belarusian theatre”. He was also actively involved in various charitable and microfinance initiatives.

== Early years ==
Bujnicki was born into the family of minor nobility on the estate of Palivačy (today in Hlybokaje district of Viciebsk region in Belarus). Upon graduation from the Riga Polytechnic School, he became a land surveyor.

While working as a surveyor in Viciebsk, Minsk and Mahilioŭ provinces of the Russian empire he acquired interest in and started recording Belarusian songs, folk legends and stories. But of particular interest for Bujnicki were Belarusian folk dances. To develop his interest further, he enrolled in a drama school in Vilna.

== First Belarusian theatre troupe ==
In 1907, Bujnicki founded a theatre troupe, which held performances in various Belarusian cities as well as Warsaw and St. Petersburg. Performances for wealthier spectators were set at a high price of two rubles, while those for farmers were free.

The troupe's performances rode the wave of the Belarusian national revival of the early 20s century. As the newspaper Naša Niva wrote in the summer of 1910:

“Dzisna does not remember such a gathering of people. Local intelligentsia and common people alike sincerely greeted the [troupe], the mighty idea of national revival warmed everyone with its hot rays, united everyone, stirred their frozen hearts, sparkled their eyes dulled from heat, and the first native word from the stage was welcomed by more than one tear."

“There was no end to the cheers [during the performance in Polacak]: the whole hall was buzzing like a beehive with swarming bees… The Belarusian theatre is becoming grounded on solid foundations, thanks to the actions and zeal of Uncle Ihnat Bujnicki and new and new forces are emerging. I sincerely thank him for these efforts and diligence, and one day, when the national consciousness of all the Belarusian people awakens, the memory of Ihnat Bujnicki will be sacred to all."

In Minsk the artists were covered with roses and after Bujnicki's performances in St. Petersburg and Warsaw, newspapers wrote about the "colossal success" of the troupe, which "awakens in Belarusians a sense of national dignity."

Bujnicki was a versatile actor himself - he appeared on stage in plays, recited poems, danced, sang solo and in the choir (as a light bass baritone).

== Final years ==
The Russian imperial authorities became concerned about the troupe's impact - Bujnicki and his associates were taken under police surveillance and some performances were banned. Pressure from the authorities and financial problems forced Bujnicki to close the theatre in 1913. Plans to create a new one were thwarted by the outbreak of World War I.

In 1913 he organised a credit society where Belarusian farmers could get a loan at a small interest rate.

During the war, Bujnicki was involved in charitable activities in support of soldiers as well as Belarusian refugees fleeing the military conflict on the Belarusian lands which had become a frontline. After the February Revolution of 1917 he was one of the initiators of the First Society of Belarusian Drama and Comedy, on the basis of which the Belarusian State Theatre would be formed in 1920.

== Death and memory ==
In 1917 Bujnicki went to the front near Maladziečna, where he became ill while preparing an amateur performance for soldiers and on 22 September he died of typhus in a hospital near the town of Haradok. His wish was to be buried in his native estate but when his daughters brought his body to Palivačy, there was no one to meet them in the war-ravaged region.

In the early 1970s, Bujnicki's neglected grave was found by Belarusian writer Uladzimir Karatkievič and Professor Uladzimir Niafeda. His remains were reburied in the nearby village of Prazaroki and a monument erected. A museum dedicated to Bujnicki has been operating at a local school since 1982.
