= Pinskaja Šliachta =

1886 play written by Vintsent Dunin-Martsinkyevich

Pinskaja Šliachta (1866)
- Author: Vincent Dunin-Marcynkievič
- Original title: Пінская шляхта
- Language: Belarusian
- Genre: Comedy
- Published: 1918

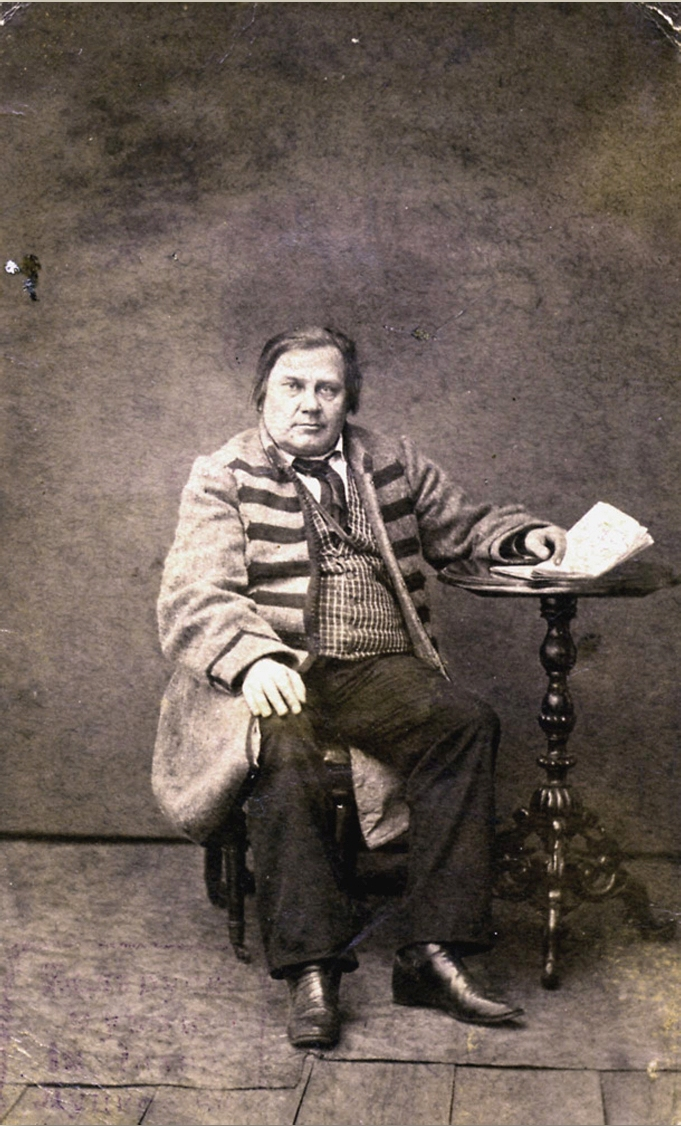
Vincent Dunin-Marcynkievič

Pinskaja Šliachta [Pinsk Nobility] (1866) is one of the most famous plays by Vincent Dunin-Marcynkievič (1808–1884), a classic writer of Belarusian literature who stood at the origins of the national literary language and professional dramatic arts.

== Background ==
The play was written in 1866, possibly during the writer's incarceration for his family's participation in the January Uprising of 1863. However, it was only published in the magazine "Volnaja Belarus" [Free Belarus] (Nos. 30–31) in 1918, with the second edition published in 1923. The long delay in publication was due to the radical content of Pinskaja Šliachta that could not bypass the tsarist censorship.

The play shows the haughtiness and self-conceit of the Belarusian petty nobility, who feel insulted if called "peasants" though they do not differ much from the villagers in their life style or economic status. At the same time they fear the Russian imperial authorities as those who have power over them. They are no longer portrayed as a noble class, but as a symbol of backwardness. The author shows his disenchantment with the role of the Belarusian gentry as a reaction to the failure of the January Uprising and consequent national humiliation. At the same time Dunin-Marcynkievič ridicules the tsarist court and the pettifoggery and bribe-taking of the Russian imperial bureaucrats who themselves breach the law and deliver absurd judgements.

== Plot ==
In the sticks of Pinsk district in the second half of the 19th century, life is always the same for local gentry men. They run their simple households, publicly display their pride, and fight with anyone who dares to think or say they are “peasants”. But everything changes when Kručkoŭ, a Russian imperial official comes to resolve a conflict between two noblemen, Cichan Pratasavicki and Ivan Ciuchaj-Lipski.

After Kručkoŭ's arrival, the action becomes a whirlwind sucking in all other characters. While the dumbfounded gentry is watching the imperial official settling their dispute and at the same time fleecing them of all their money, packages of loot are carried away in a squeaky cart.
