= Vintsent Dunin-Martsinkyevich =

Belarusian writer and activist (1808–1884)

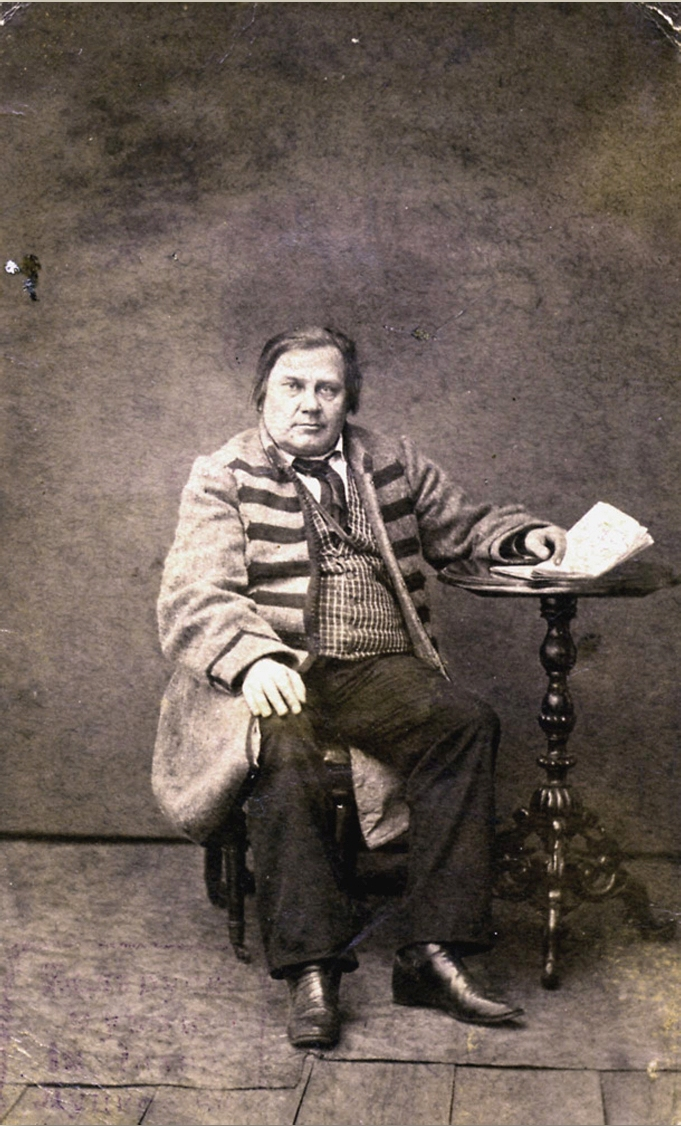
Vincent Dunin-Marcinkievič

Vintsent Dunin-Marcinkievič (Belarusian: Вінцэнт (Вінцук) Дунін-Марцінкевіч; Polish: Wincenty Dunin-Marcinkiewicz; February 8, 1808 – December 21, 1884) was a Polish-Belarusian writer, poet, dramatist and social activist and is considered one of the founders of the modern Belarusian literary tradition and national school theatre.

== Biography ==
Vintsent Dunin-Marcinkievič was born in a Belarusian part of the Polish–Lithuanian Commonwealth, in a noble family (szlachta of Łabędź coat of arms) in the region of Babruysk. He graduated from the medical faculty of the University of St. Petersburg.

He wrote both in contemporary Belarusian and Polish languages. Writing in the modern Belarusian language he faced the problem of it not being standardized, as the written tradition of the Old Belarusian (Ruthenian) language had been largely extinct by that time.

From 1827 Dunin-Marcinkievič lived and worked in Minsk as a bureaucrat. In 1840 he acquired a mansion near Ivyanets and went there to write most of his works.

In 1859 he translated Adam Mickiewicz's epic poem Pan Tadeusz into the Belarusian language and published it in Vilnius. Under the pressure of Russian Empire authorities he succeeded in publishing only the first two chapters of the poem. This was the first translation of the poem into another Slavic language.

Dunin-Marcinkievič was accused by the police in separatist propaganda during the January Uprising. He was arrested but later set free. However, he was kept under supervision by the police. His daughter, Kamila Marcinkievič, participated in the uprising and was sentenced to the psychiatric hospital for her political activity.

The writer was buried in Tupalshchyna, now Valozhyn raion.

== Most notable works ==
- Opera Sielanka (Belarusian: "Ідылія", "Idyll"; 1846) — the first play, written partly in contemporary Belarusian language.
- Poem "Hapon" (Belarusian: "Гапон"; 1855) — the first poem, written completely in contemporary Belarusian.
- Plays and poetry, some of them in contemporary Belarusian (1855–1861), some of them being:
  - "Wieczernice i Opętany" (1856);
  - "Interested? Read it! Three tales and brief verse" (Polish: "Ciekawyś? Przeczytaj! Trzy powiastki i wierszyk ulotny"; 1857);
  - "Belarusian piper" (Polish: "Dudarz białoruski");
  - "Bylicy, raskazy Nawuma" (Belarusian: "Быліцы, расказы Навума"; not published);
  - "Chalimon na karanacji" (Belarusian: "Халімон на каранацыі"; not published);
  - "Lucynka czyli Szwedzi na Litwie" (1861).
- Play Pinskaja šliachta (Belarusian: "Пінская шляхта", "Pinsk nobility", Polish: "Pińska szlachta"; 1866).
- The first Belarusian translation of A. Mickiewicz's Pan Tadeusz (1859; published only partly, the circulation confiscated almost immediately).

Note: proper names and place names are rendered in BGN/PCGN.
