= Nuclear power in Belarus =

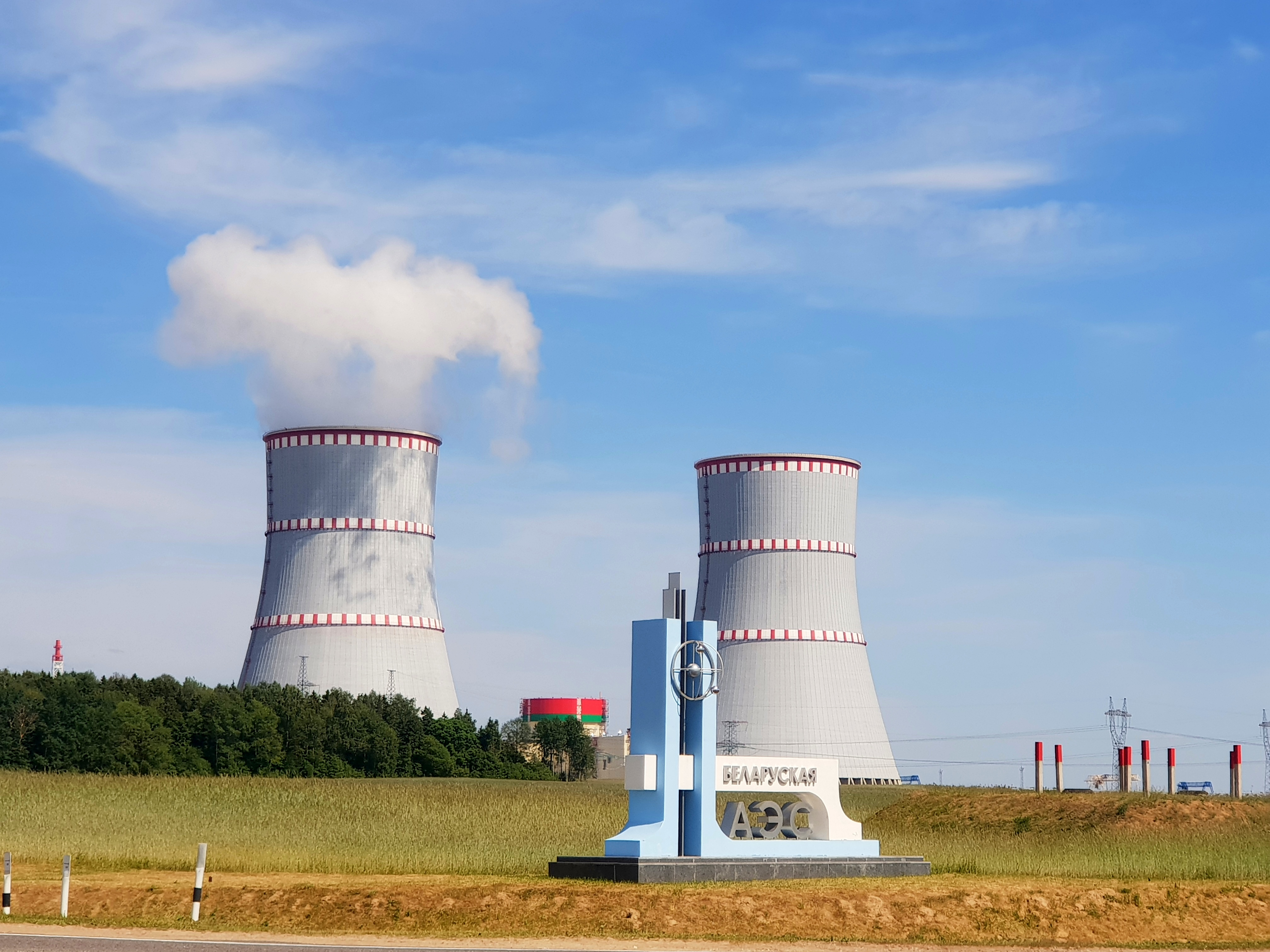
The Belarusian nuclear power plant in Astraviec

Nuclear power in Belarus (Belarusian: Ядзерная энергетыка Беларусі) is a branch of the energy sector of the Republic of Belarus based on the use of peaceful nuclear energy for the generation of electricity and heat. As of 2025, the country operates one commercial nuclear power plant—the Belarusian Nuclear Power Plant (BelNPP) in the Astraviec District, which consists of two power units with a total capacity of 2400 MW.

The transition to nuclear generation became the largest industrial project in the history of independent Belarus. It allowed the country to completely abandon electricity imports and significantly reduce its dependence on natural gas supplies, whose share in the energy balance decreased from 95% to 65%. At the same time, the process of establishing the industry took more than half a century: from the first large-scale surveys and secret mobile reactors in the 1960s to the cancellation of all projects after the Chernobyl disaster and their difficult revival at the beginning of the 21st century.

== History ==
=== Soviet period ===
The history of nuclear energy development in Belarus began with scientific research projects. As early as 1962, the first research nuclear reactor, IRT-2000, was built in the settlement of Sosny near Minsk. In 1965, the Joint Institute for Power and Nuclear Research "Sosny" began developing a unique project—the mobile nuclear power plant "Pamir". It was a mobile nuclear installation mounted on the chassis of heavy MAZ-537 wheeled tractors. The plant, operated by 28 people, was designed to autonomously supply energy to remote military facilities and could operate without refueling for a year and a half. Two such complexes were assembled, one of which successfully passed tests. However, after the Chernobyl disaster, the project was shut down, and the installations themselves were destroyed; only the metal part of the reactor was preserved, installed as a monument in Sosny.

In parallel with military developments, the leadership of the BSSR acutely felt a deficit of electricity for civilian industry. The republic had no large hydrocarbon deposits or conditions for powerful hydroelectric power stations. In 1968–1969, specialists from the Leningrad institute Teploelektroproekt conducted large-scale surveys for the construction of the first stationary NPP. Due to the need for a large volume of fresh water for cooling, seventeen sites were considered across all six regions: Damanava in the Ivacevičy District, Vierchniadzvinsk near the urban settlement of Vierchniadzvinsk, Nieščarda in the Rasony District, Absterna in the Miory District, Snudy in the Braslaŭ District, Janova on the border of the Polack District and Ušačy Districts, Bialanavičy in the Pietrykaŭ District, Akciabrski near the urban settlement of Akciabrski, Sialiec on the border of the Dziatlava District and Lida Districts, Slonim near the city of Slonim, Narač and Svir in the Miadzieĺ District, Stoŭbcy near the city of Stoŭbcy, Broža in the Babrujsk District, Jalizava in the Asipovičy District, Asipovičy near the city of Asipovičy, and Čyhirynka on the border of the Bychaŭ District and Kiraŭsk Districts.

From this list, in 1971, the union authorities approved the Snudy site. However, the very next year, the Ministry of Energy and Electrification of the USSR (Minenergo) and the Ministry of Medium Machine Building of the USSR changed their decision. Preference was given to the neighboring Drukšiai site in the Lithuanian SSR, as it had more favorable geological conditions and allowed for savings on construction. The Ignalina Nuclear Power Plant was built there, which also powered parts of the Belarusian territories but left the republic without its own nuclear generation facility.

The loss of the project near Braslaŭ did not stop the nuclear ambitions. According to the strategic plans of the USSR Minenergo, the construction of a nuclear power plant in the south of the republic with a capacity of up to 6000 MW was to begin in 1987, in the north with a capacity of up to 10,000 MW in 1988, and another one in the southeast with up to 8000 MW in 1992. The projects were impressive in their engineering scale. In the north of the country, near Lake Vymna in the Haradok District, one of the largest nuclear power plants in the world was planned to be built, enlarging the lake's area by diverting water from the Dzvina. In the Brest Region, near Bielaaziorsk, a complex was designed where the NPP would work in conjunction with an underground pumped-storage power plant. The most ambitious project was considered in the Stolin District: on the swamps between Stolin and Davyd-Haradok, they wanted to create an artificial cooling sea with an area of 36 square kilometers using water from the Prypiać and build a new city, Vidzibor. However, it was quickly abandoned due to the excessive complexity of execution.

In the early 1980s, projects for the construction of nuclear district heating plants (AST) based on the AST-500 design for the direct heating of large cities were also considered. By December 1985, sites for ASTs near Viciebsk, Homieĺ, and Mahilioŭ had been approved. Simultaneously, a struggle unfolded over the construction of a classic NPP on the shores of Lake Sialiava in the Krupki District. Despite protests from environmentalists due to its proximity to a hydrological reserve, the government of the BSSR finally approved this site in January 1984.

While theoretical debates continued, the authorities launched a real construction project in the Puchavičy District, just 40 km from Minsk. To solve the capital's heating problem, a joint decision by the Central Committee of the CPSU and the Council of Ministers of the USSR was made on June 26, 1980, to build the Minsk Nuclear Cogeneration Plant (ATETs) with two VVER-1000 reactors. A large-scale Komsomol construction project began in 1983. On the site of drained swamps, an ideal city for nuclear workers was being erected—the settlement of Družny. By the spring of 1986, the foundation of the first reactor was ready, and a start-up backup boiler house was commissioned.

After the Chernobyl disaster, about 250 families (over 1,200 people) of highly specialized professionals from the evacuated Ukrainian city of Pripyat were relocated specifically to Družny. They were supposed to continue working at the Minsk facility. However, mass radiophobia and public protests forced the union authorities to backtrack, and on July 1, 1987, a resolution was issued to mothball the Minsk NPP. To avoid losing the invested funds and the workforce, the facility was repurposed into a conventional combined heat and power plant running on natural gas. Plans to build other NPPs and ASTs in Belarus were completely cancelled.

=== Post-Soviet period: from 74 sites to Astraviec ===
The collapse of the Soviet economy and severe radiophobia in society led to a virtual moratorium on discussions about developing nuclear energy in independent Belarus throughout the 1990s. Nevertheless, the problem of energy dependence on Russian energy resources (about 95% of the electricity in the country was generated using imported natural gas) forced the authorities to seek alternatives. As early as the early 1990s, the National Academy of Sciences of Belarus (NASB) theoretically identified more than 70 potential sites for locating a plant.

The real revival of the nuclear program began after 2005, when a new Concept of Energy Security of the Republic of Belarus was approved. Specialists once again turned to researching potential locations. After screening out territories unsuitable due to environmental and geographical parameters (including almost the entire Minsk Region, the Prypiać basin with its high groundwater tables, and the Viciebsk Region due to its small catchment area), four sites remained in play: Krasnapalianskaja (Čavusy District), Kukšynaŭskaja (Škloŭ District), Vierchniadzvinskaja, and Astravieckaja.

The Vierchniadzvinsk site was quickly rejected due to groundwater issues. As of 2007, the eastern locations were considered absolute priorities: the Krasnapalianskaja and Kukšynaŭskaja sites in the Mahilioŭ Region. However, during deep drilling and geological surveys, an insurmountable obstacle was discovered. At a depth of 25 meters, geologists found thick layers of water-bearing chalk (up to 35 meters thick). This created a high threat of karst processes—the formation of underground voids, which made the placement of a heavy nuclear facility critically dangerous.

Following consultations with Russian and Ukrainian engineers, it was decided to permanently abandon the eastern sites. In December 2008, a political decision was made in favor of the backup option—the Astraviec site, located between the towns of Michališki and Varniany in the Astraviec District of the Hrodna Region, just 23 km from the border with Lithuania. This choice was attributed to ideal geological conditions—the presence of a reliable monolithic bedrock without seismic or karst threats.

In parallel, the search for an international partner was underway. Belarus considered proposals from American-Japanese (Westinghouse-Toshiba) and French-German (Areva) companies, and proposals were made to China and the United States. However, due to political motives, the need to sign complex intergovernmental agreements, and lending conditions, the only realistic candidate left was the Russian state corporation Rosatom. On March 15, 2011, an agreement was signed in Minsk with the government of Russia on cooperation in the construction of an NPP, and the Russian side provided a loan of up to $10 billion to finance 90% of the project's cost. On October 11, 2011, a contract was signed with CJSC Atomstroyexport for the turnkey construction of two power units.

== Astraviec Nuclear Power Plant ==
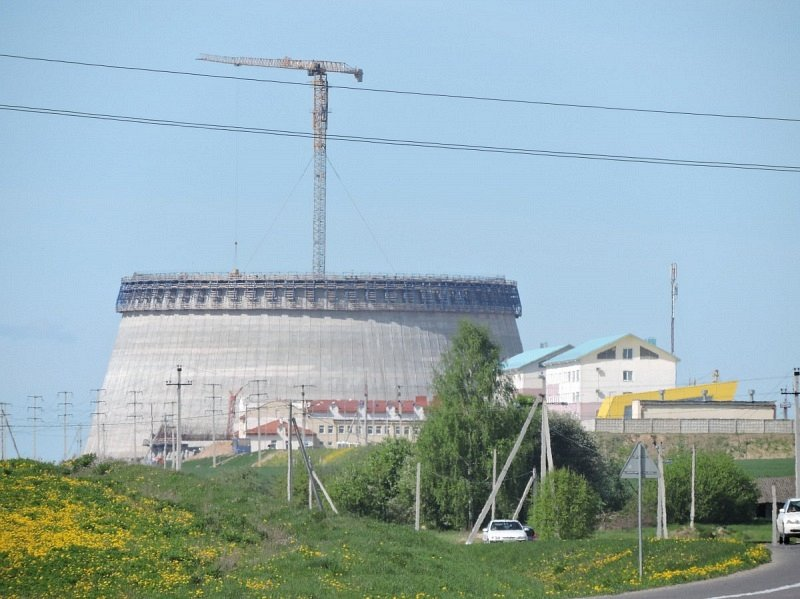
Construction of the cooling tower of the Belarusian Nuclear Power Plant

The main stage of construction of the first nuclear power plant in the history of independent Belarus began in November 2013. The "AES-2006" project (Generation III+) was created taking into account the heightened safety requirements following the accident at the Japanese Fukushima NPP. The plant is equipped with two VVER-1200 pressurized water reactors with a total capacity of 2400 MW.

According to technical specifications, the reactors are protected by a double reinforced concrete containment (80 cm of inner layer, a 180 cm air gap, and another 120 cm of outer wall). The structure is capable of withstanding the crash of aircraft fragments weighing up to 5.7 tons, as well as earthquakes, hurricanes, and floods. Both active and passive safety systems are provided (including additional mobile diesel generators and a core catcher for the reactor core).

The physical start-up and connection of the first power unit of the BelNPP to the power grid took place on November 3, 2020, and it was put into commercial operation on June 10, 2021. The second power unit was connected to the grid in the spring of 2023 and accepted into commercial operation on November 1 of the same year.

During its first years of operation (up to the end of 2025), the BelNPP generated over 53 billion kWh of electricity. This allowed for a significant transformation of the country's economy:

- The level of consumption of imported natural gas for energy generation fell from 95% to 65%, which saved more than $1.6 billion in budget funds.
- Greenhouse gas emissions were reduced by more than 26 million tons.
- Belarus completely stopped electricity imports.
- The city of Astraviec transformed into a dynamic regional center: its population grew from 8,000 to 15,000 people, and about 3,000 specialists work at the plant itself (the average age of the team is 38 years).

At the same time, the construction and launch of the plant were accompanied by an acute interstate conflict with neighboring Lithuania. Official Vilnius strongly opposed the placement of the nuclear facility just 50 km from its capital from the very beginning and legislatively banned the import of electricity from the BelNPP. However, despite political rhetoric and the blocking of sales markets in the Baltic states, physical energy flows continued through existing infrastructural interconnectors for some time after the launch. The Belarusian side repeatedly invited experts from the IAEA and European regulators, who confirmed the project's compliance with international safety standards and conducted the necessary stress tests.

== Plans for a second NPP ==
Following the successful commissioning of the two power units of the BelNPP in Astraviec, active discussions began at the highest state level regarding the possibility of further expanding the country's nuclear capacity. The main argument in favor of such a decision is the rapid growth of electricity consumption within the republic, driven by the development of electric transport (in 2025, the number of electric vehicles exceeded 44 thousand), the massive transition of housing to electric heating, as well as the robust development of cryptocurrency mining and large data centers. As a result, consumption reached a historical maximum of 43.3 billion kWh in 2024, and by 2030, the Ministry of Energy predicts this figure will rise to 47 billion kWh.

To cover this deficit, the government officially began exploring two conceptual options for the further development of nuclear energy in 2025:

1. Building a third power unit at the existing BelNPP. This option is considered the fastest and most cost-effective. All necessary production, technological, and social infrastructure has already been created at the Astraviec site, and the soils were thoroughly studied during the construction of the first two units.
2. Constructing a completely new, second NPP. The eastern part of Belarus is being considered as the most likely region for the new plant, particularly the territories south of Mahilioŭ. This more expensive option is proposed to create a powerful socio-economic driver for the development of the eastern regions, create new jobs, and attract investment (similar to the development of Astraviec).

The political leadership of Belarus, represented by Aliaksandr Lukašenka, supports the idea of building the second plant in the east of the country. This choice is openly argued not only by domestic needs but also by foreign policy motives: the possibility of exporting electricity to the "new" and border regions of the Russian Federation, for example, to the Bryansk Oblast. The Russian side, the state corporation Rosatom, has confirmed its readiness to implement the new project and secure its financing if there is a guaranteed consumer and an appropriate tariff. The plant itself is expected to be built by Belarusian specialists, with the exception of supplying the nuclear reactor itself from Russia.

However, returning to the plans to locate an NPP in eastern Belarus once again raises the critical issue of geological conditions. It was precisely due to the presence of thick chalk layers and the high risk of karst sinkholes that the Mahilioŭ sites (Krasnapalianskaja and Kukšynaŭskaja) were permanently rejected by specialists back in 2008. A solution on how this geological trap will be circumvented during modern construction has not yet been announced. The feasibility study and final choice of the path for further development of nuclear energy (a third unit or a new NPP) are expected to be completed by the end of 2025.

== Handling of nuclear materials and waste ==
A key issue in the operation of nuclear energy is the safe handling of fresh and spent nuclear fuel. The policy of the Russian Federation when building NPPs abroad ("turnkey") envisions providing the plant with its own fuel for its entire lifecycle, followed by the return of spent materials to Russia for high-tech reprocessing. Subsequently, the hazardous radioactive waste remaining after the reprocessing process must be returned to the country of origin (i.e., Belarus) for final disposal in special geological repositories.

To legally secure this closed cycle, on November 8, 2021, the governments of Belarus and Russia, represented by Minister of Energy Viktar Karankievič and the head of Rosatom Alexey Likhachev, signed a corresponding intergovernmental agreement that strictly regulates the procedure for the cross-border transport of nuclear materials between the two countries.

== Personnel training ==
The development of the domestic nuclear industry required the creation of a new system for training national personnel. The country's leading technical universities were involved in this process. Three institutions were designated as base higher education institutions: the Belarusian National Technical University (Faculty of Power Construction), the Belarusian State University (Faculty of Physics), and the Belarusian State University of Informatics and Radioelectronics.

In addition to internal training, an agreement was signed with Russia to train Belarusian specialists in Russian specialized centers. In particular, the experience and training centers of the Balakovo Nuclear Power Plant (Saratov Oblast) were actively used to train operating personnel.

A unique feature of the Belarusian project was the creation of its own training center directly on the site of the BelNPP three years prior to the launch of the first power unit. All of its simulators and software were not based on an abstract design, but were completely tied to the specific working documentation and equipment of the plant itself.

It is worth noting that when staffing the plant, Belarus took the opportunity to repatriate many Belarusian nuclear specialists who, after the cancellation of the Minsk ATETs in 1987, had left to work at various NPPs of the former USSR.

== International cooperation and IAEA missions ==
From the moment the decision was made to build the NPP, the Republic of Belarus began active cooperation with the International Atomic Energy Agency (IAEA). Since 2010, the agency's expert missions have regularly worked in the country, assessing various aspects of the nuclear program and comparing existing practices with international safety standards.

During the design, construction, and commissioning of the plant, key IAEA missions took place in Belarus, including:

- INIR (Integrated Nuclear Infrastructure Review) — a comprehensive assessment of the readiness of the country's nuclear infrastructure to build an NPP (first mission in 2012, second in 2020).
- IRRS (Integrated Regulatory Review Service) — an assessment of the state system of regulation of nuclear and radiation safety (2016).
- SEED (Site and External Events Design) — an assessment of the NPP site from the perspective of external threats and design solutions (2017).
- EPREV (Emergency Preparedness Review) — an assessment of the readiness to respond to nuclear and radiological emergencies (2018).
- Pre-OSART (Pre-Operational Safety Review Team) — a pre-operational review of operational safety before the launch of power units (2019, 2021).
- IPPAS (International Physical Protection Advisory Service) — an assessment of the physical protection system for nuclear facilities and materials (2021).

In addition to the IAEA, the Belarusian side voluntarily conducted stress tests of the plant according to the methodology of the European Union, after which the site was visited by experts from the European Nuclear Safety Regulators Group (ENSREG). Reports on the results of all key reviews are available on the official IAEA website.

== Problems and incidents ==
The construction and commissioning of the Belarusian NPP were accompanied by a number of technical incidents and problems that raised concerns both within the country and abroad.

One of the most high-profile incidents occurred during the construction phase in July 2016, when the reactor vessel for the first power unit "slipped" during transfer and struck the ground from a height of several meters. Although the incident was not related to nuclear safety, it caused widespread public resonance, especially in neighboring Lithuania. As a result, the Belarusian side made a political decision to replace the damaged vessel with a new one, which was supplied by the general contractor.

Following commissioning, the first power unit was repeatedly disconnected from the grid due to the triggering of automatic protection systems. The first disconnection occurred the very next day after the plant's official launch, on November 8, 2020, due to the failure of voltage transformers. Later, the plant was shut down for testing, routine maintenance, and due to the triggering of the generator protection system. In total, during its first year of operation, the power unit was shut down about 8 times.

In December 2021, the "Cyber Partisans" community published documents obtained from the NPP's internal networks, which allegedly contained information about 18,000 defects in the first power unit identified during various stages of construction and commissioning works.

== Economic aspect and integration into the energy system ==
The Belarusian NPP project is the most massive and expensive in the history of independent Belarus. The initial cost of the plant was estimated at $10–11 billion. In 2019, Aliaksandr Lukašenka stated that through strict control over construction, the cost had been reduced to $7 billion. Later, in 2021, it was announced that the final cost would be around $6 billion.

To integrate the plant into the country's overall energy system, large-scale infrastructure modernization was carried out. About 1,600 km of high-voltage transmission lines were built, four system-forming substations were modernized, and a new "Pastavy" substation was commissioned. Furthermore, to balance the system and consume excess energy at night, modern electric boilers with a total capacity of 916 MW were installed at 20 energy facilities.

The commissioning of the NPP not only met domestic needs but also made the economy more competitive by reducing dependence on imported gas. The cost of nuclear fuel accounts for only about 20% of the cost of electricity production, making it much more stable compared to volatile hydrocarbon prices.
