= Braslau =

Braslau may refer to:

- Braslaw (Braslaŭ), variant transliteration of the name of a city in Belarus
- Braslaw District, Belarus
- Braslaw Lakes, a national park in Belarus
- Sophie Braslau (1892–1935), American contralto

== See also ==
- Breslau, former name of Wrocław, Poland
