= Lake Ikazn =

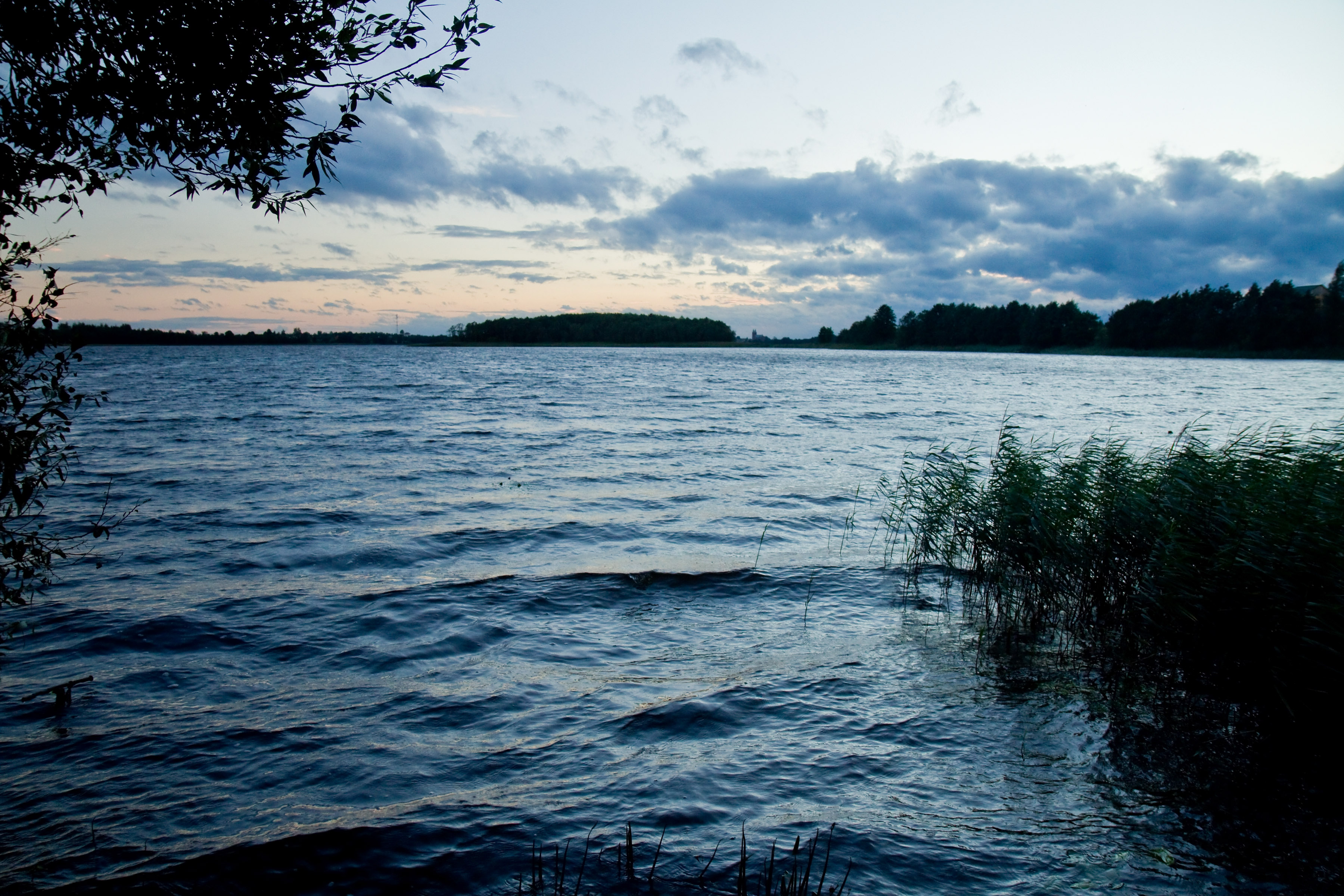

- Location within Belarus
- Coordinates: 55°37′32.76″N 27°17′4.37″E
- Type: Natural freshwater lake
- Catchment area: 25.3 km^{2} (9.8 mi^{2})
- Basin countries: Belarus
- Max. length: 2.97 km (1.85 mi)
- Max. width: 1.13 km (0.70 mi)
- Surface area: 2.38 km^{2} (0.92 mi^{2})
- Max. depth: 8.4 m (28 ft)
- Surface elevation: 146 m (479 ft)
- Islands: 2
- Settlements: Ikaźń (town) and Kanechiki (village)

Lake Ikazn (Belarusian: Возера Іказнь) is a lake in the Braslau Lakes National Park of northern Belarus. It lies about 14 km east of Braslau and has an area of 2.38 km ² and length of 2.97 km . The maximum width is 0.8 km and its coastline is 12.7 km in length. The greatest depth of the lake is 8.4 m. The water volume is 7.94 mln m ³ and the catchment area 25.3 km ². The slopes of the valley are 12–15 m are forested towards the southeast. The lake contains 2 small islands with a total area of 1.2 hectares.
