= Lake Ilmenak =

Lake in Belarus

- Возера Ільменак (Belarusian)
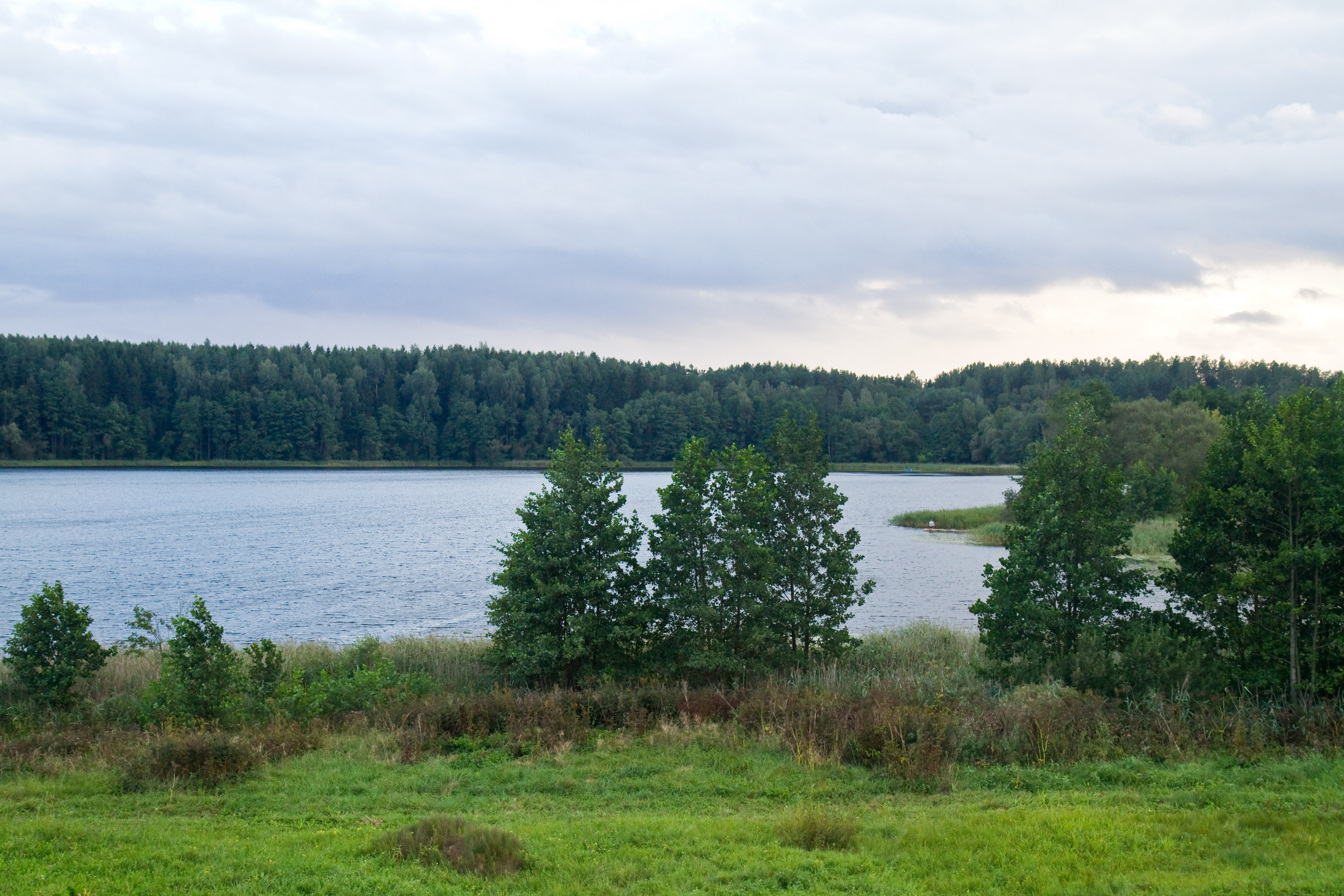

- Location within Belarus
- Coordinates: 55.6801°N 27.1892°E
- Max. length: 0.64 kilometres (0.40 mi)
- Max. width: 0.47 kilometres (0.29 mi)
- Surface area: 0.2 square kilometres (0.077 sq mi)
- Average depth: 6.2 metres (20 ft)
- Shore length^{1}: 1.9 kilometres (1.2 mi)
- ^{1} Shore length is not a well-defined measure.

Lake Ilmenak (Belarusian: Возера Ільменак) is a lake in the Braslau Lakes National Park of northern Belarus. It lies about 10 kilometres (6.2 mi) northeast of Braslau.

== Description ==
The lake is small and covers an area of 0.2 square kilometres (0.077 sq mi) with a length of 0.64 kilometres (0.40 mi). The maximum width is 0.47 kilometres (0.29 mi) and the coastline is 1.9 kilometres (1.2 mi). The water volume is 0.61 mln m³ and the catchment area is 2.5 square kilometres (0.97 sq mi). The greatest depth is 6.2 metres (20 ft). The slopes of the valley reach a height of 10–20 metres (33–66 ft), and are wooded in the south, west and north. The banks are low and sandy. Two streams flow into the lake.
