= Lake Strusta =

Lake in Vitebsk Region, Belarus

Strusta
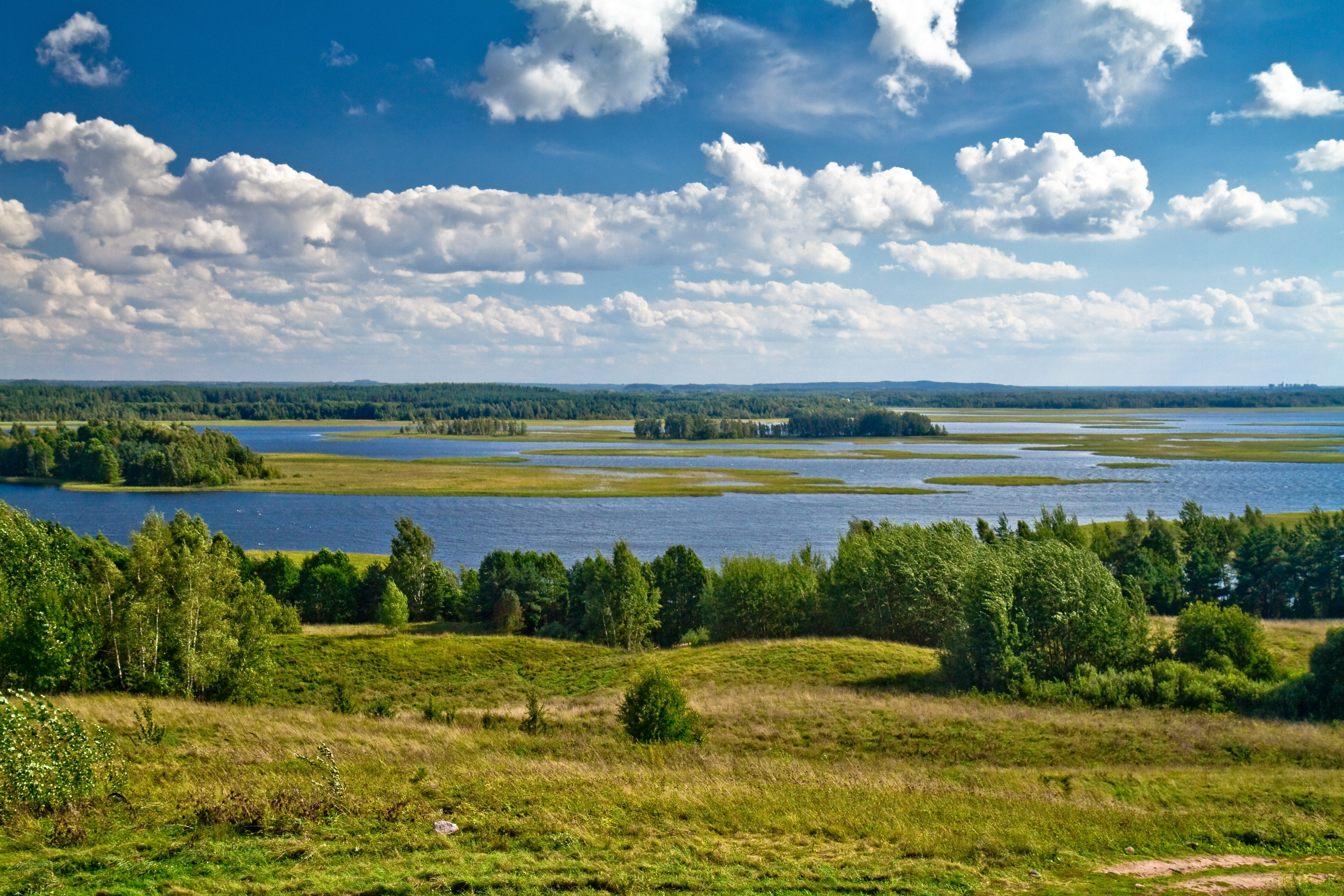
- Lake Strusta

- Location within Belarus
- Coordinates: 55°42′N 27°01′E
- Surface area: 13 km^{2} (5.0 sq mi)
- Average depth: 7.3 m (24 ft)
- Max. depth: 23 m (75 ft)

Lake Strusta (Belarusian: Стру́ста; Lithuanian: Strustas) is a freshwater lake in the Braslaw District of Vitebsk Region in Belarus. Strusta is the third largest of the 30 Braslaw Lakes and the sixteenth largest in the country.

Lake Strusta is fed by several rivulets running from the Snudy, Balojsa, and Yelno lakes. It is drained by a little river into the Vojsa. The lake has around 22 known species of fish in it, including the European cisco.

The lake covers an area of 13 square km. Its maximum depth is 23 meters. The shores are sandy and marshy, with thick stands of bulrushes. There are numerous little fjords and outlets along the shoreline.

== Gallery ==
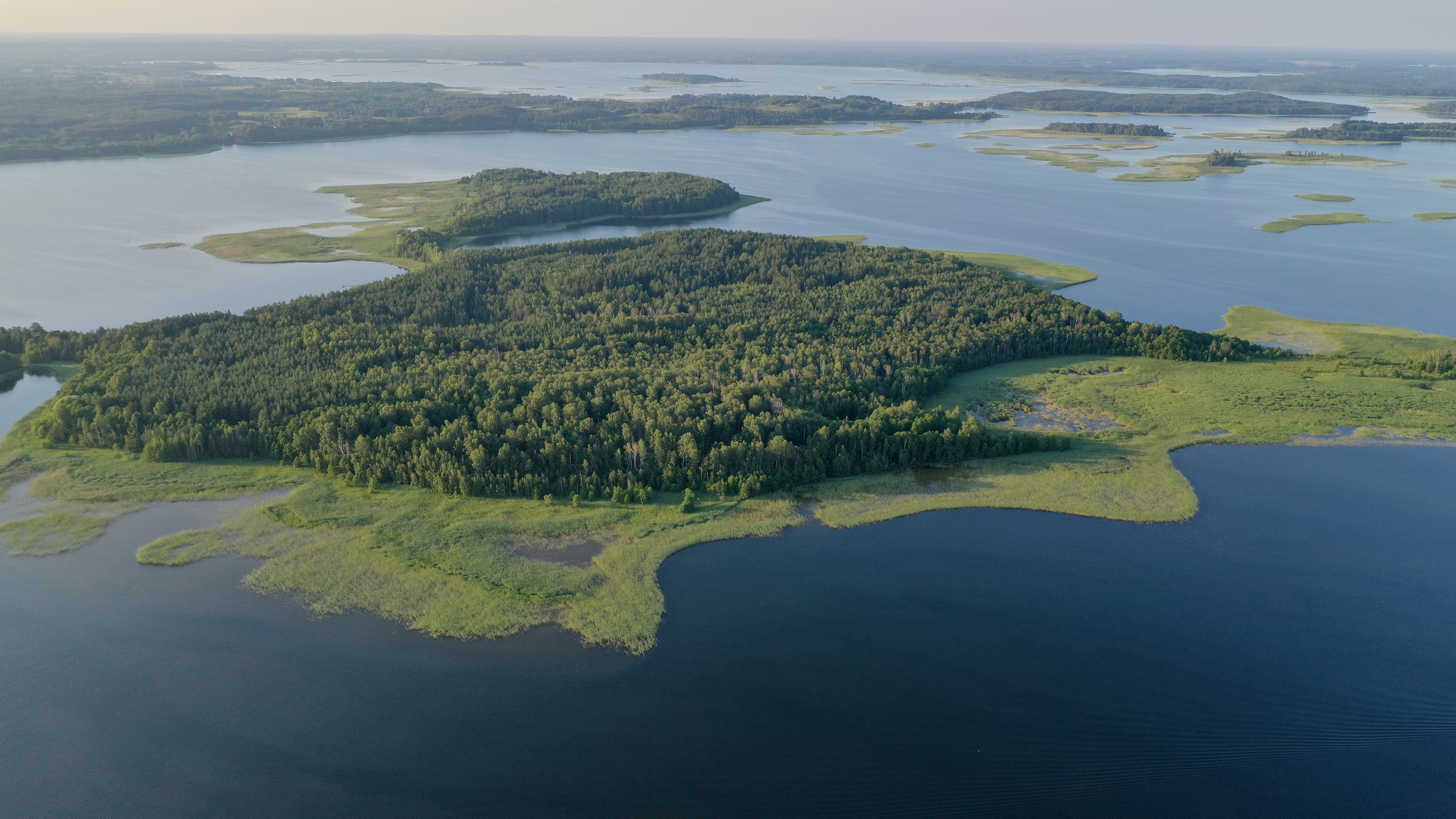

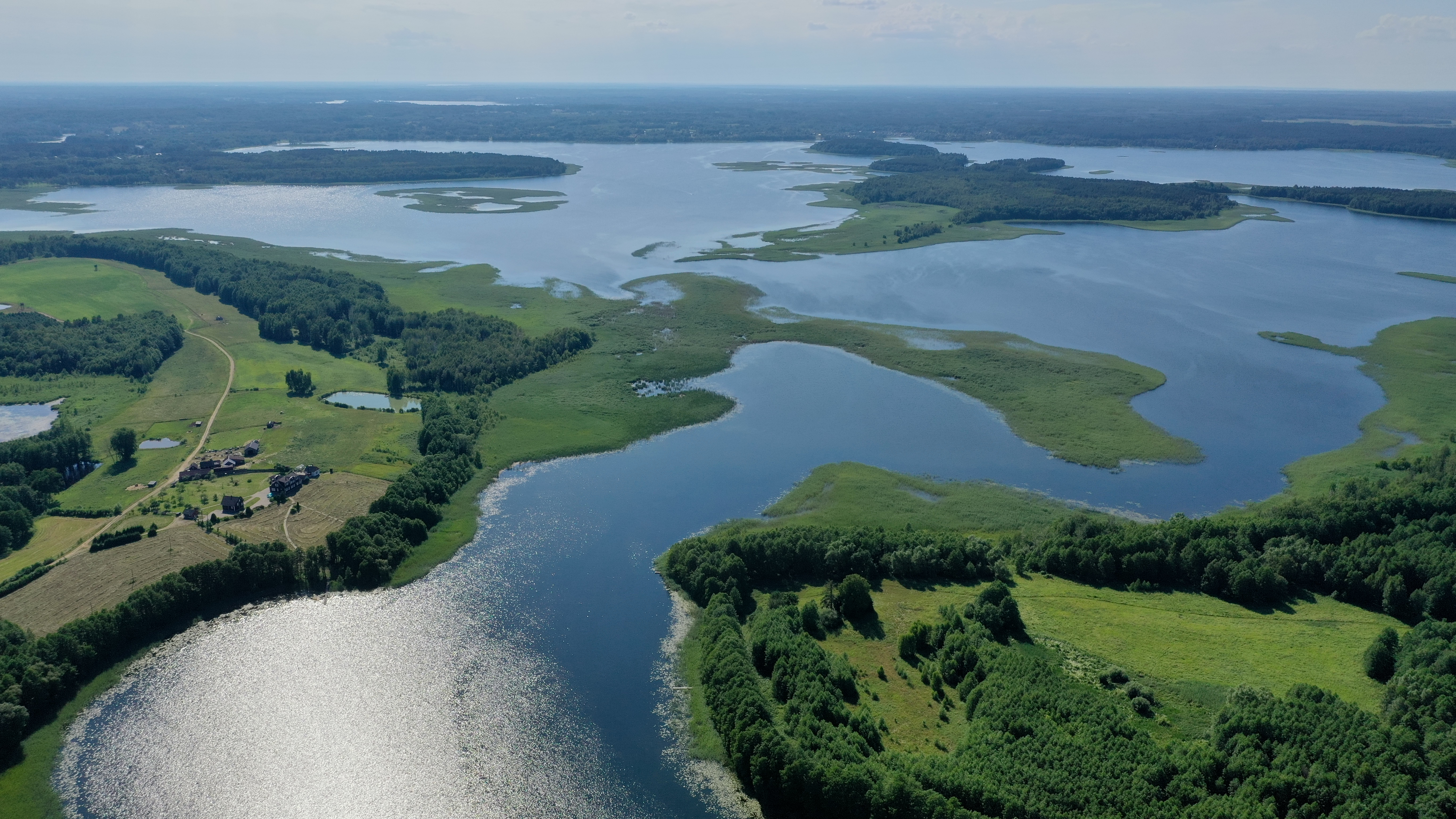
