= Dryvyaty =

Lake in Vitebsk Region, Belarus

Lake Dryvyaty
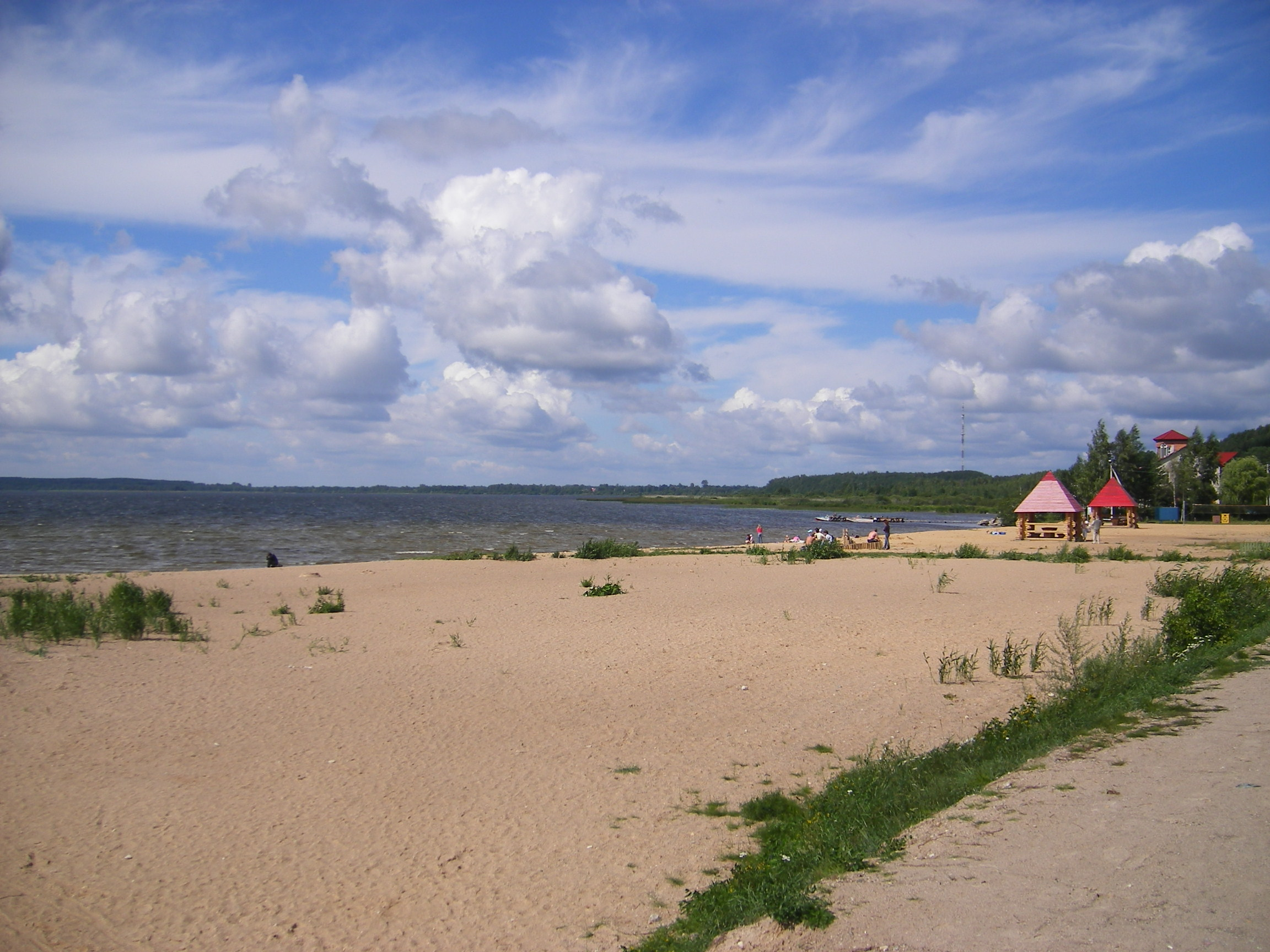
- Lake Dryvyaty in Belarus

- Location within Belarus
- Coordinates: 55°37′0.66″N 27°1′13.91″E
- Lake type: freshwater
- Primary inflows: Usvica, Zolvica, Raka (river)
- Primary outflows: Druyka (river)
- Catchment area: 459 km^{2} (177 mi^{2})
- Basin countries: Belarus
- Max. length: 9.86 km (6.13 mi)
- Max. width: 4.5 km (2.8 mi)
- Surface area: 36.1 km^{2} (13.9 sq mi)
- Average depth: 6.1 m (20 ft)
- Max. depth: 12 m (39 ft)
- Water volume: 223.5×10^{6} m^{3} (7.89×10^{9} cu ft)
- Shore length^{1}: 37.6 km (23.4 mi)
- Surface elevation: 141.6 m (465 ft)
- Settlements: Braslaw
- ^{1} Shore length is not a well-defined measure.

Dryvyaty (Belarusian: Дрывя́ты, Lithuanian: Druvetas, Polish: Drywiaty) – is a lake in Braslaw District, Vitebsk Region, in Belarus. Dryvyaty is the largest lake of the Braslaw Lakes national park and the fifth largest lake of the country. When full, it has a surface area of around 36.1 km².
