= Vitebsk region =

Region of Belarus

Coordinates: 55°20′N 29°00′E

Vitebsk region Віцебская вобласць (Belarusian) Витебская область (Russian)
- Region
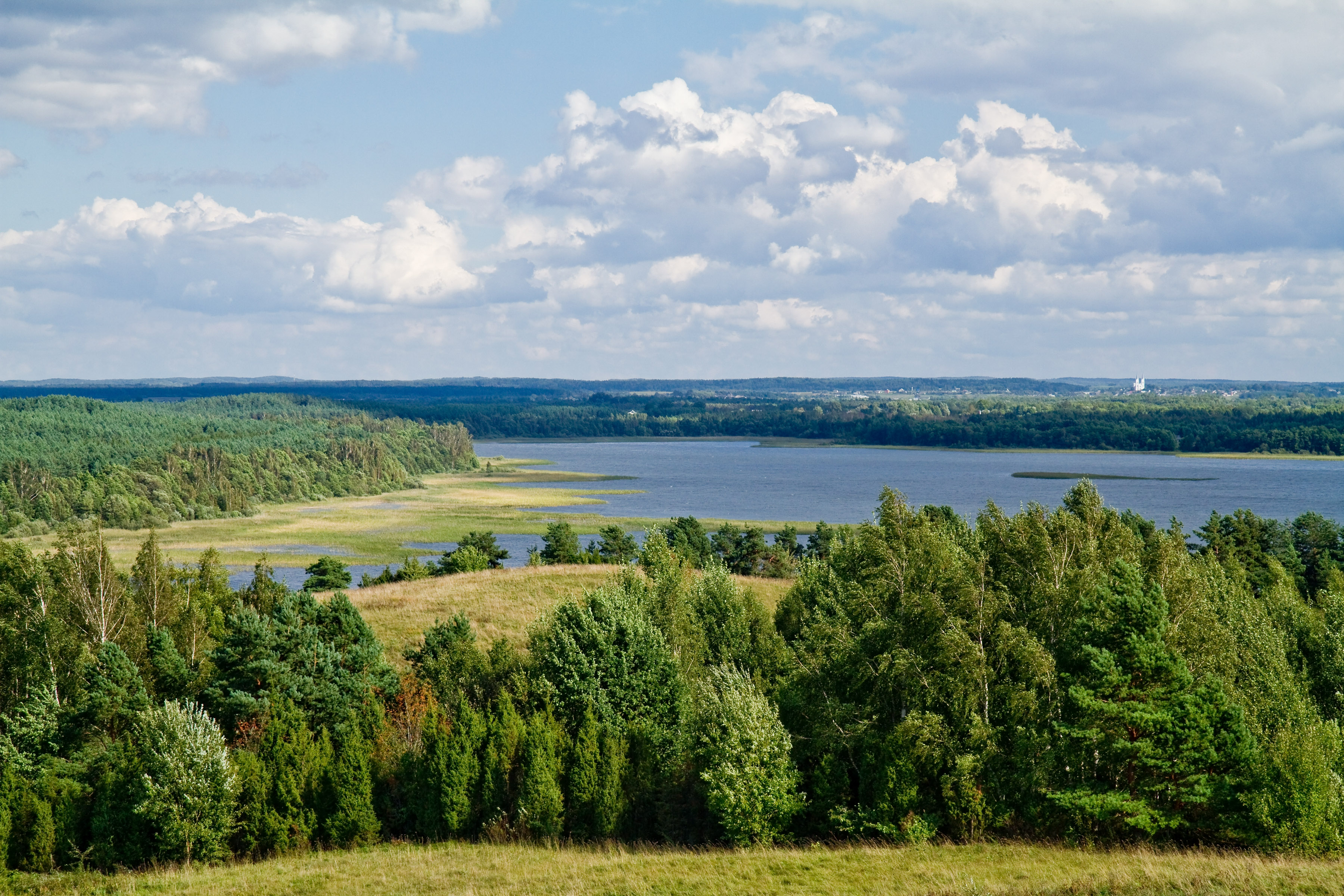
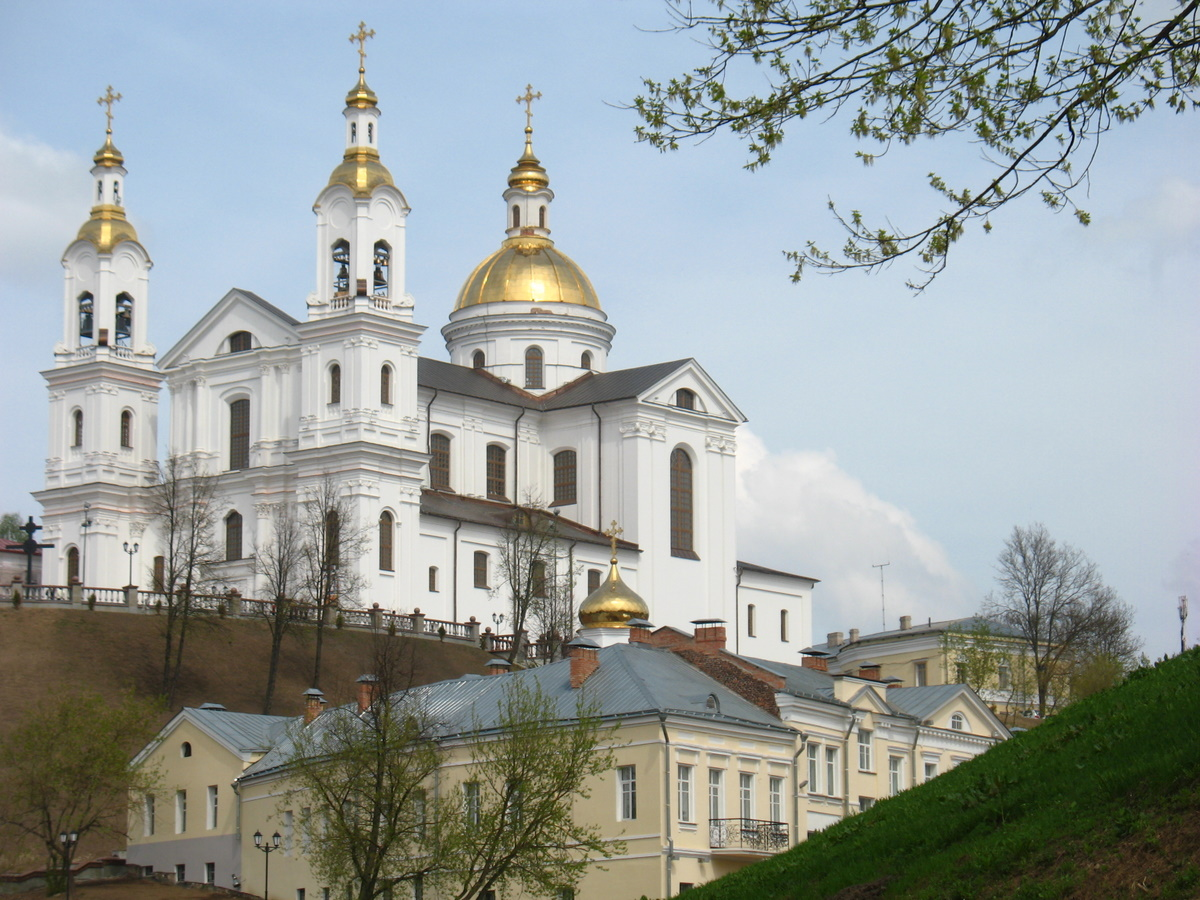
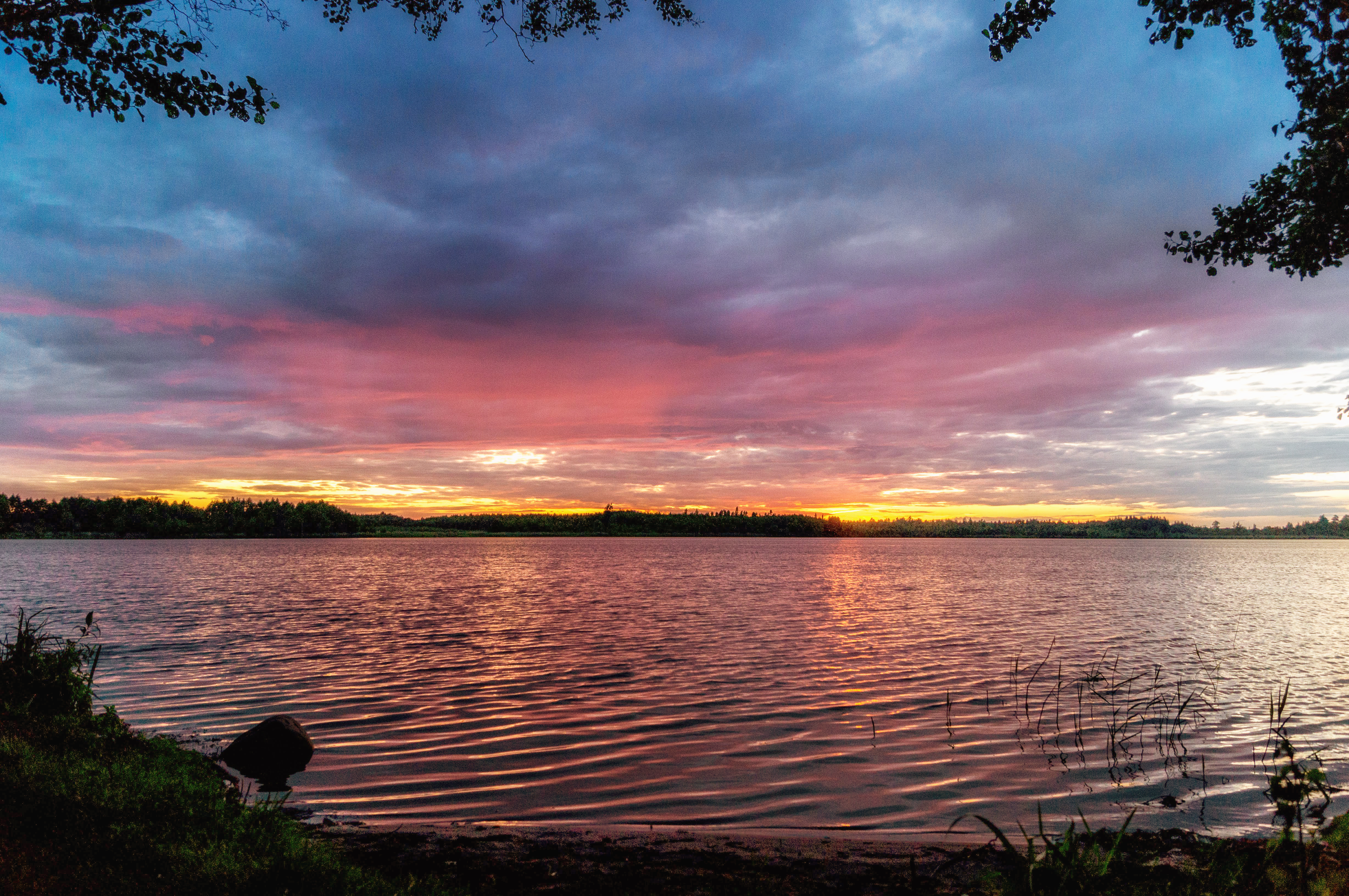
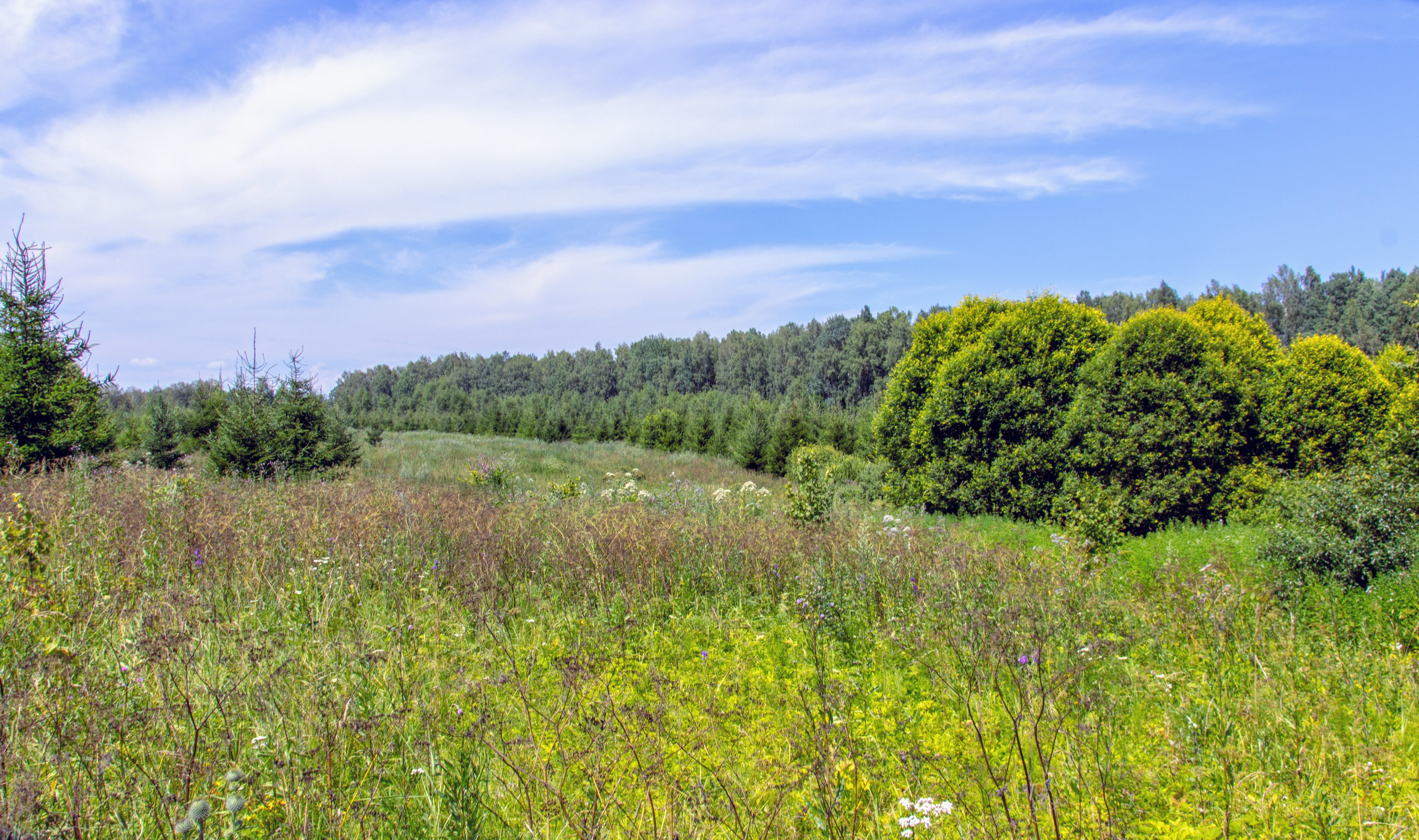
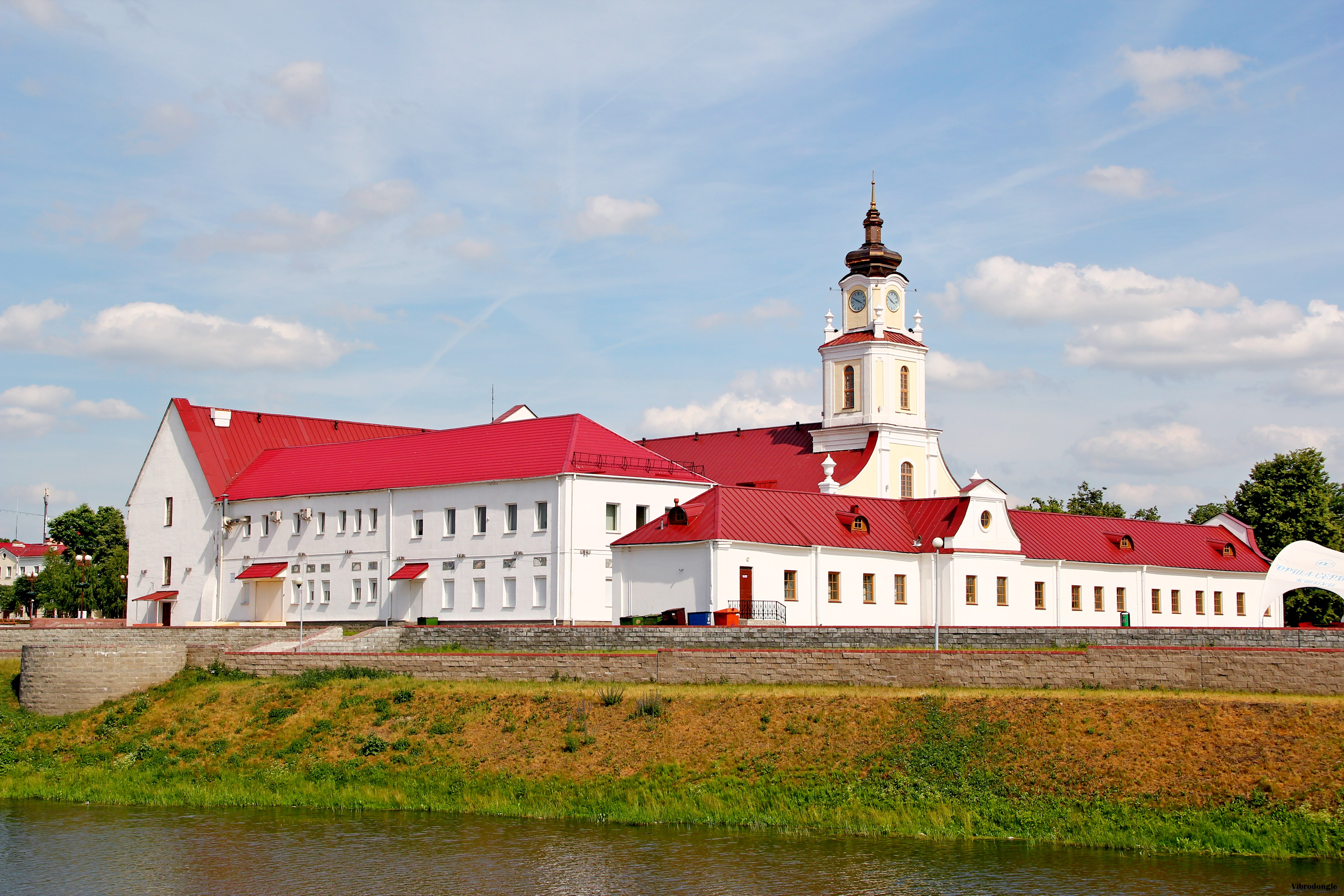
- From the top to bottom-right: Majak Hill, The Assumption Cathedral, Akuniova Lake, Syanno District, Jesuit Collegium

- Flag Coat of arms

- Country: Belarus
- Administrative center: Vitebsk
- Largest cities: Vitebsk – 369,933; Orsha – 115,938; Novopolotsk – 102,288
- Districts: 21; Cities – 19; Urban localities – 26
- City districts: 5

Government
  - Chairman: Alexander Rogoznik

Area
  - Total: 40,049.99 km^{2} (15,463.39 sq mi)

Population (2024)
  - Total: 1,081,911
  - Density: 27.01401/km^{2} (69.96598/sq mi)

GDP (nominal,2024)
  - Total: Br 21.870 billion (US$6.699 billion)
  - Per capita: Br 20,307 (US$6,220)
- ISO 3166 code: BY-VI
- HDI (2022): 0.793 high · 5th
- Website: www.vitebsk-region.gov.by

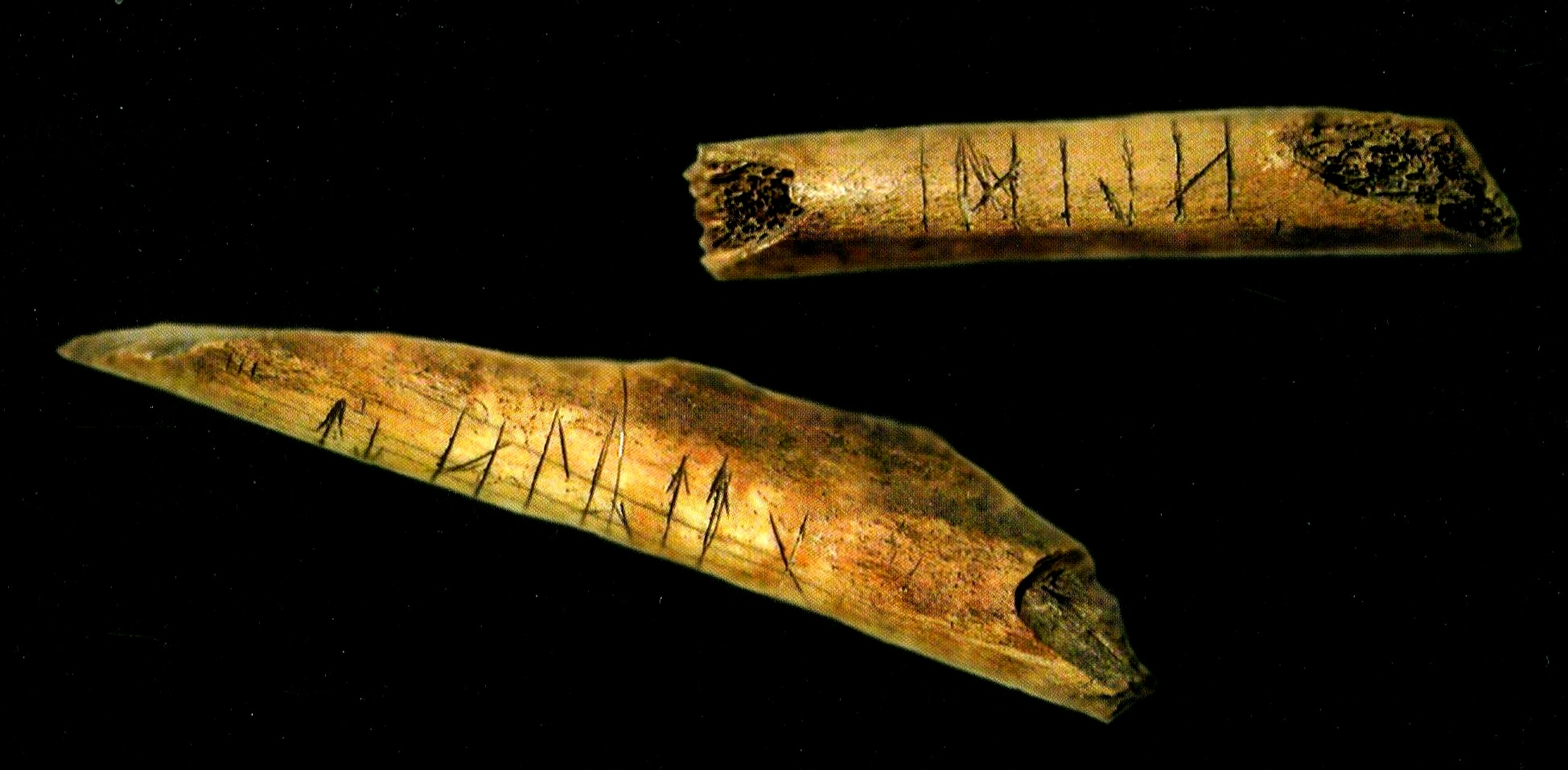
Two 12th–13th c. runic inscriptions from Maskovichi

Vitebsk region, also known as Vitebsk oblast (Note: Russian: Витебская область, romanized: Vitebskaya oblast', IPA: [ˈvʲitʲɪpskəjə ˈobləsʲtʲ].) or Vitsyebsk voblasts, (Note: Belarusian: Віцебская вобласць, romanized: Viciebskaja voblasć, IPA: [ˈvʲit͡sʲɛpskaja ˈvɔblasʲt͡sʲ].) is one of the regions of Belarus. Its administrative center is Vitebsk. It is located in the north of the country and borders Russia.

As of 2019, it had a population of 1,135,731, the lowest population density in Belarus at 30.6 p/km².

Key cities in the region include Vitebsk, Orsha, Polotsk, and Novopolotsk.

== Geography ==
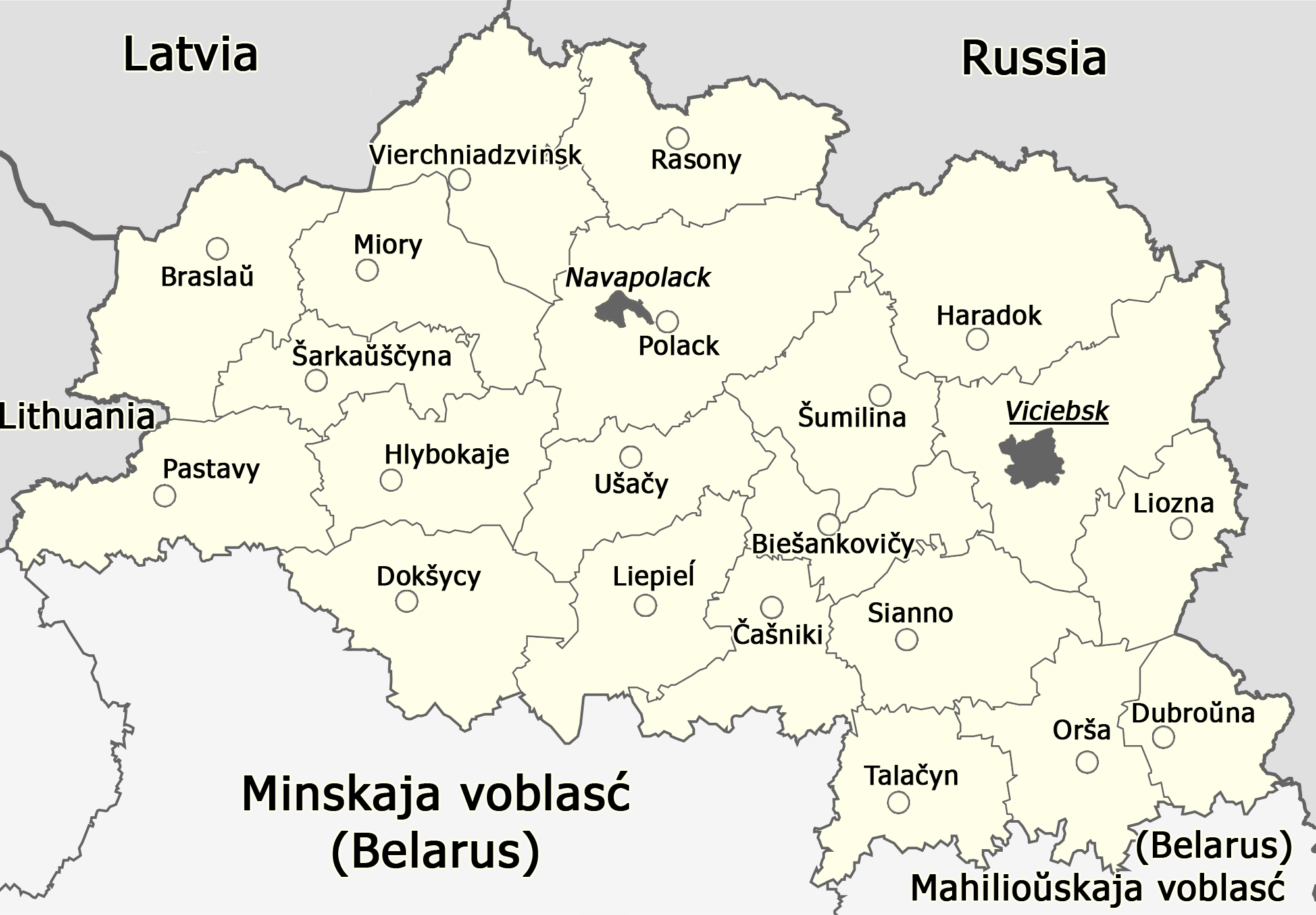
Map of the administrative subdivisions of the Vitebsk oblast

Vitebsk region covers an area of 40,000 km², which is about 19.4% of the national total. It is bordered to the north by Pskov Oblast of Russia, by Smolensk Oblast of Russia to the east, to the south by Minsk and Mogilev regions, to the southwest by Minsk and Grodno regions, and to the west and northwest by Vilnius and Utena counties of Lithuania and Augšdaugava, Krāslava and Ludza municipalities of Latvia.

The northern extreme point of Belarus is situated in Verkhnyadzvinsk District of Vitebsk region, north of Lake Osveya.

In 2000 Belarusian scientists Alexey Solomonov and Valery Anoshko published a report in which they stated that the geographic centre of Europe was located near Lake Sho (Belarusian: Шо) in the Vitebsk region.

The region is known for its numerous lakes. The largest lakes of the Vitebsk region are: Osveyskoye (2nd largest in Belarus), Lukomskoye (4th largest), Drivyaty (5th largest in Belarus and the largest of Braslav Lakes). Other lakes are Beloye, Nescherdo, Snudy, Lisno, Ezerische, Strusto, Richi, Losvido and Lepelskoye.

The region has more national parks, nature reserves, and wildlife preserves of national importance than any other region of Belarus. Braslav Lakes and Naroch National Parks and Berezinski Biosphere Reserve comprise 3,4% of the whole region's territory, and 22 wildlife preserves of national importance make up 4,1% of the region.

== Economy ==
The main industry of the region is petrochemical. "Naftan" (Navapolatsk) is one of the biggest oil refineries in Belarus and a major polymer manufacturer, "LLK-Naftan" (Navapolatsk) produces oil additives. Share of the food industry in the regional industrial output is estimated at 14-15%. Share of textile, garment and shoe factories (light industry) is estimated at 5-6%, the major factories are "Belvest" (shoes), "Marko" (shoes; both in Vitebsk), Orsha flax factory, "Vitebsk carpets", "Znamya industrializacyi" garment factory in Vitebsk, "Bell Bimbo" (baby clothes manufacturer). The biggest electrical and machinery plants (5-6% of the regional industrial output) are "Vityas" in Vitebsk (TV sets and household appliances), "Vistan" machine tool factory, Vitebsk factory of electrical measuring instruments, Vitebsk factory of tractor spare parts, "Red fighter" machine tool factory in Orsha.

Lukoml power station is the biggest power plant in Belarus.

Vitebsk region has a number of important transport connections with Russia, Ukraine, the Baltic countries, and Poland.

== Tourism ==
The number of travel agencies in Vitebsk region has been growing from 25 in 2000 to 83 in 2010; most agencies provide both agent and operator services. The numerous lake resorts attract tourists for several-night stays. Polotsk and Vitebsk are the most popular cultural tourism destinations of the region.

== Administrative subdivisions ==
The Vitebsk region is subdivided into 21 districts, 2 cities of oblast subordinance, 19 additional cities, 249 selsovets, and 26 urban-type settlements.

=== Districts of Vitebsk region ===
- Beshankovichy District
- Braslaw District
- Chashniki District
- Dokshytsy District
- Dubrowna District
- Haradok District
- Hlybokaye District
- Lyepyel District
- Lyozna District
- Miory District
- Orsha District
- Pastavy District
- Polotsk District
- Rasony District
- Sharkawshchyna District
- Shumilina District
- Syanno District
- Talachyn District
- Ushachy District
- Vitebsk District
- Vyerkhnyadzvinsk District

=== Cities and towns ===
Population of cities and towns in Vitebsk region according to 2023 estimates:

English	Belarusian	Russian	Pop. (2023)
Vitebsk	Віцебск	Витебск	359,148
Orsha	Орша	Орша	103,658
Novopolotsk	Наваполацк	Новополоцк	96,320
Polotsk	Полацк	Полоцк	79,960
Pastavy	Паставы	Поставы	18,772
Hlybokaye	Глыбокае	Глубокое	17,707
Lyepyel	Лепель	Лепель	17,182
Novolukoml	Новалукомль	Новолукомль	12,048
Haradok	Гарадок	Городок	11,570
Baran	Барань	Барань	10,301
Talachyn	Талачын	Толочин	9,691
Braslaw	Браслаў	Браслав	9,426
Chashniki	Чашнікі	Чашники	7,843
Miory	Мёры	Миоры	7,815
Syanno	Сянно	Сенно	7,158
Dubrowna	Дуброўна	Дубровно	6,909
Beshankovichy	Бешанковічы	Бешенковичи	6,884
Vyerkhnyadzvinsk	Верхнядзвінск	Верхнедвинск	6,883
Dokshytsy	Докшыцы	Докшицы	6,759
Dzisna	Дзісна	Дисна	1,417

== Demographics ==
As of 2008, the birth rate was 9.7 per 1000, while the death rate was 15.5 per 1000. As of 2017, the birth rate was 9.6 and the death rate was 14.4. Rasony District, Shumilina District, Verkhnyadzvinsk District had the highest birth rates (over 11), while the city of Navapolatsk (Novopolotsk), Beshankovichy District, Haradok District had the lowests birth rates (less than 9). 16.1% of the population were under working age, 56.6% of working age, 27.3% over working age (averages in Belarus – 17.7%, 57.2%, 25.1%).

In 2017, the region had negative net migration rates for both internal and international migrations (-2,102 and -63 respectively). 5,227 of those who departed from the region in 2017 arrived in Minsk, 2,021 in the Minsk region, 1,630 in the Mahilioŭ (Mogilev) region, less than 700 – in each of the other regions. 3,858 people arrived in the region from Minsk, 1,731 from the Mahilioŭ (Mogilev) region, 1,355 from the Minsk region, less than 750 – from each of the other regions.

As of 2018, 53.7% of the region's population were female, 46.3% were male (averages in Belarus – 53.4% and 46.6% respectively).

Share of urban population in the region is increasing continuously since 1950 (21.5% in 1950, 77.4% in 2018).

Year	1939	1950	1955	1960	1965	1970	1975	1980	1985
Population (thousands)	1,702.5	1,256.2	1,243.3	1,289.9	1,313.5	1,368.8	1,384.1	1,386.1	1,402.3
Year	1990	1995	2000	2005	2006	2007	2008	2009	2010
Population (thousands)	1,415.7	1,426.3	1,366.4	1,289.5	1,273.8	1,259.4	1,247.3	1,237.5	1,229.4
Year	2011	2012	2013	2014	2015	2016	2017	2018	2019
Population (thousands)	1,221.8	1,214.1	1,208	1,202.1	1,198.5	1,193.5	1,188	1,180.2	1,171.5

Birth & death rates	1950	1960	1970	1980	1985	1990	1995	2000	2005	2010	2011	2012	2013	2014	2015	2016	2017
Birth rate	24	21.6	14.6	14.2	14.8	13.2	9.1	8.5	8.4	10.1	10.1	10.9	11.1	11.1	11.2	11.1	9.6
Death rate	7.8	7	8.5	11.3	12.3	12.5	14.9	15.1	16.5	16.7	16.2	15.4	15.4	14.7	14.7	14.6	14.4

Life expectancy at birth	1990	1995	2000	2005	2010	2015	2016	2017
Overall	71	68	68.4	68.1	69.5	72.9	73.3	73.3
female	76.3	74.9	75.6	75.7	77	78.9	79.4	79.3
male	67.3	64.4	64.2	63.3	65.1	69.2	69.4	69.4

Marriages and divorces	1950	1960	1970	1980	1990	1995	2000	2005	2010	2015	2016	2017
Marriages (total)	11,589	15,275	12,645	13,908	13,480	10,571	7,936	9,037	9,542	9,803	7,536	7,582
Marriages (per 1000 population)	9.2	11.9	9.2	10	9.5	7.4	5.8	7.1	7.8	8.2	6.3	6.4
Divorces (total)	159	872	2,835	4,641	5,006	6,465	6,339	4,209	4,800	4,007	4,205	3,983
Divorces (per 1000 population)	0.1	0.7	2.1	3.3	3.5	4.5	4.7	3.3	3.9	3.4	3.5	3.4

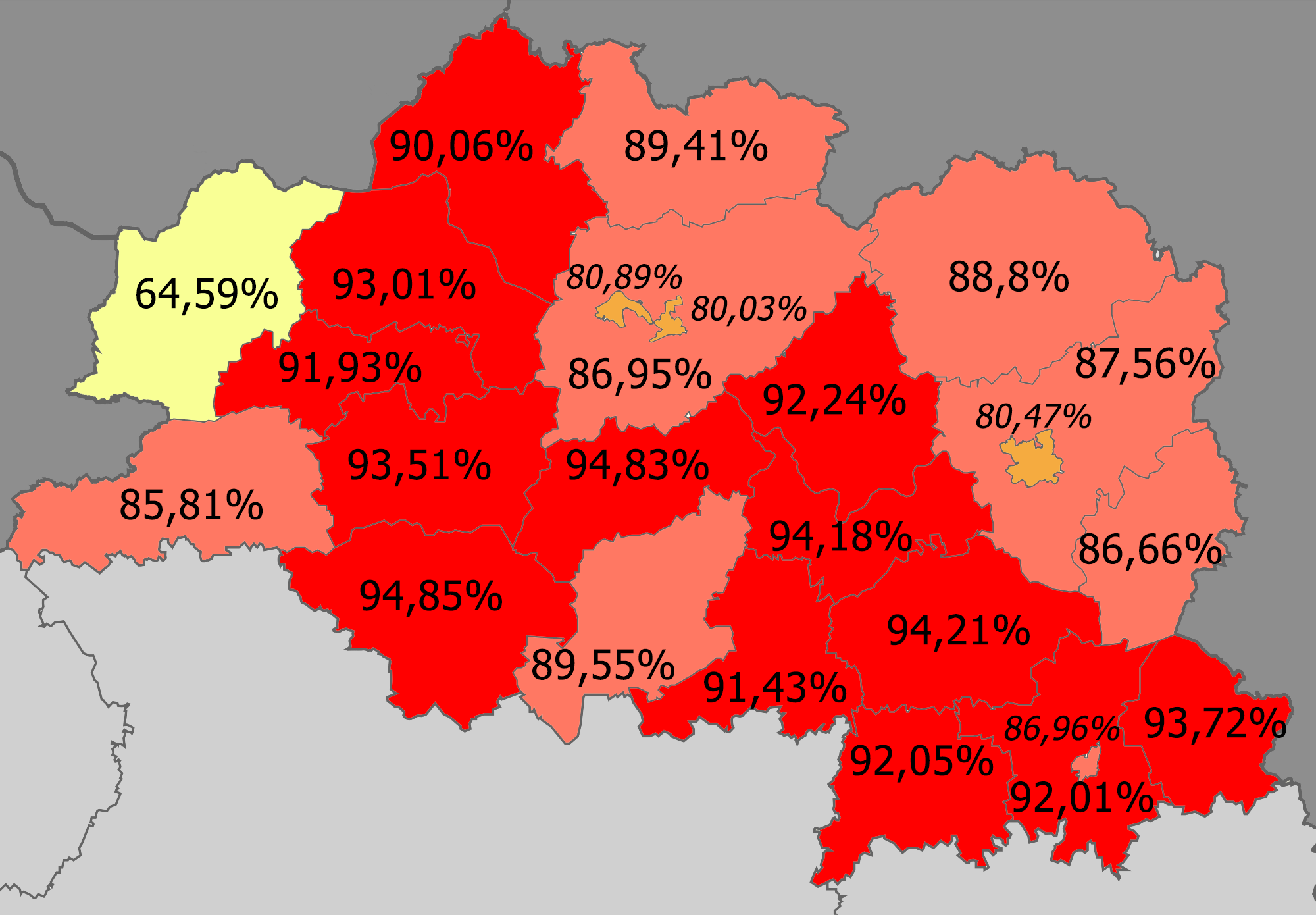
Belarusians in the region
>90%
85—90%
80–85%
<80% (64.59%)

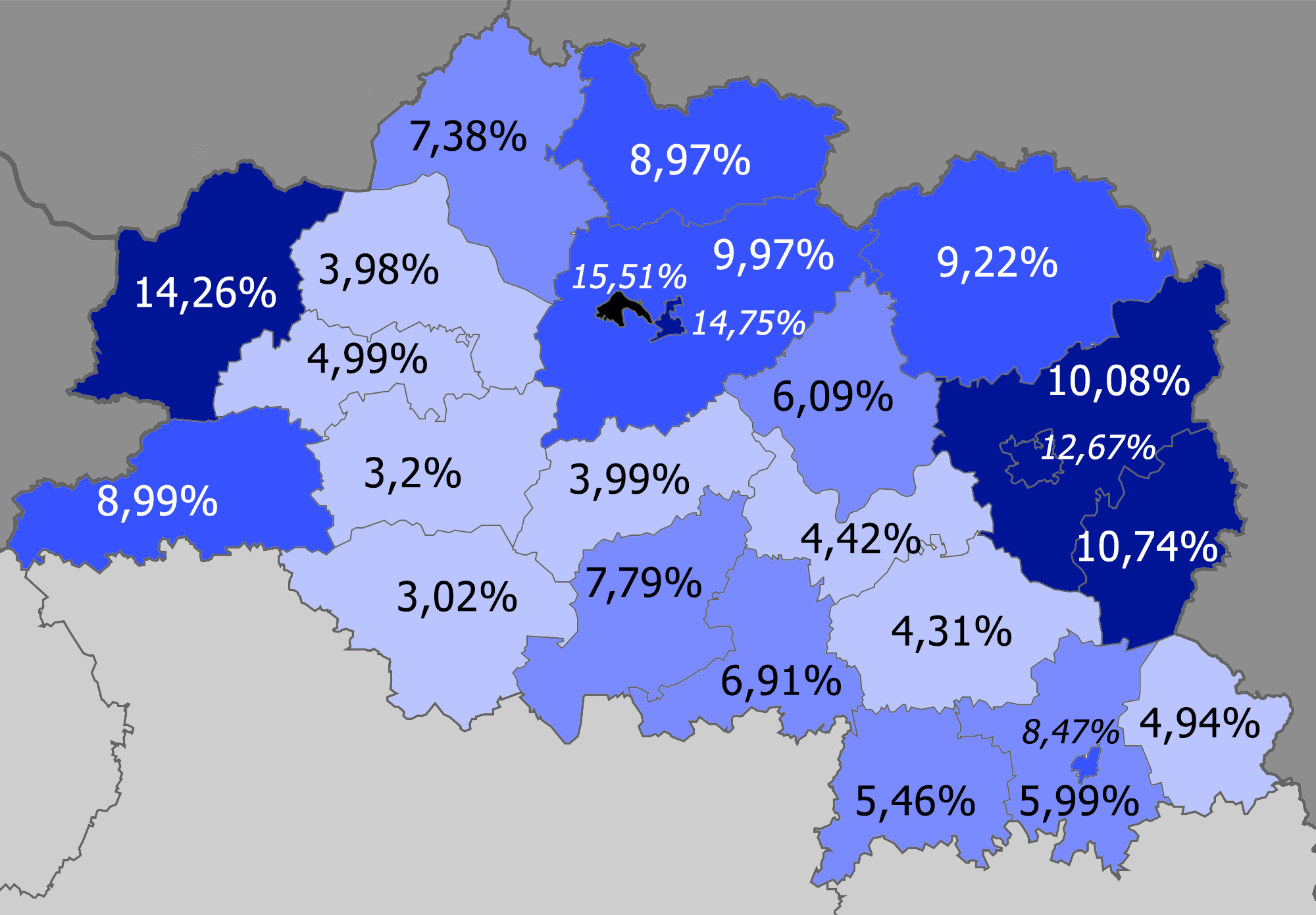
Russians in the region
>15% (15.51%)
10–15%
8–10%
5–8%
<5%

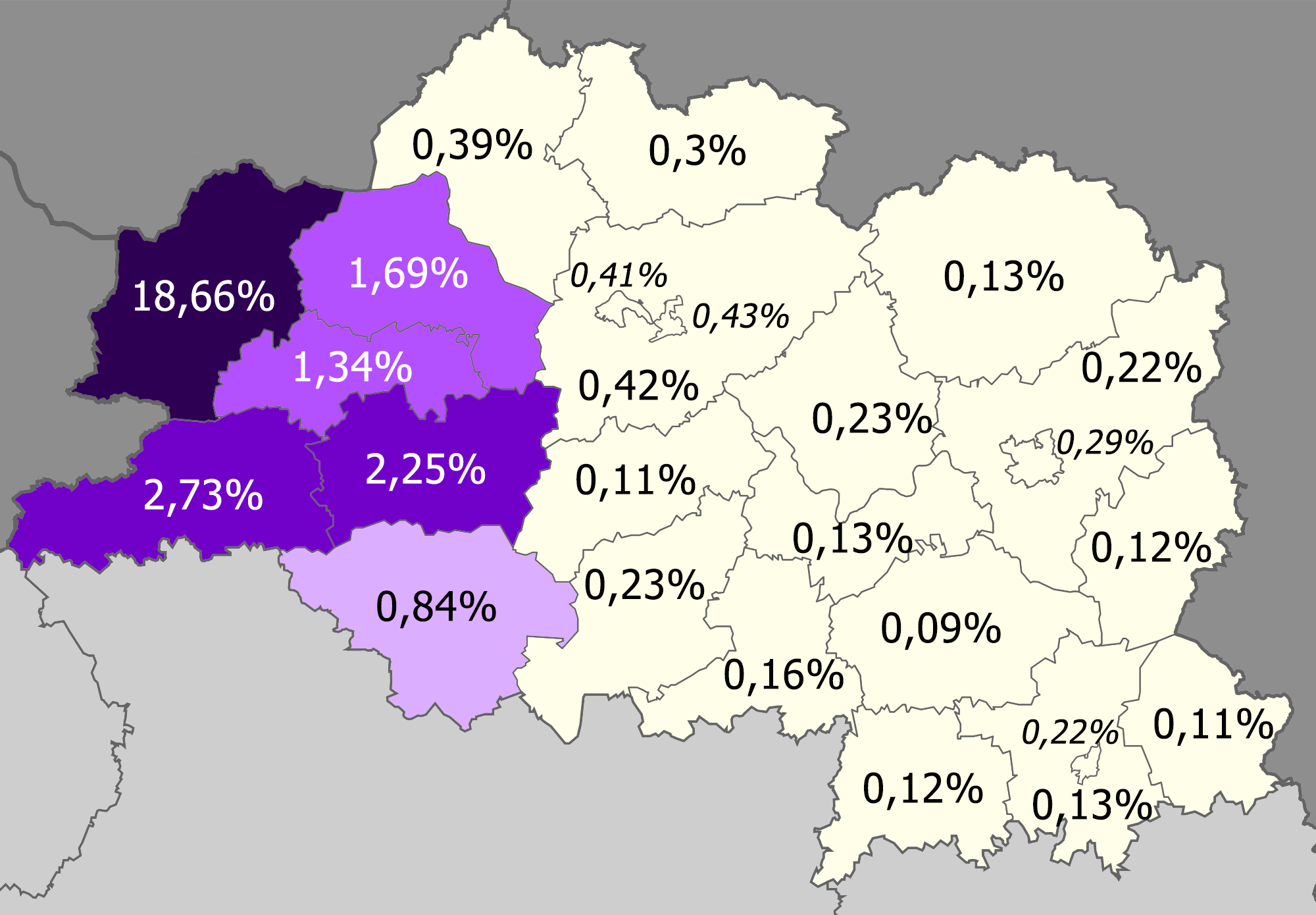
Poles in the region
>5% (18.66%)
2–5%
1–2%
0.5–1%
<0.5%
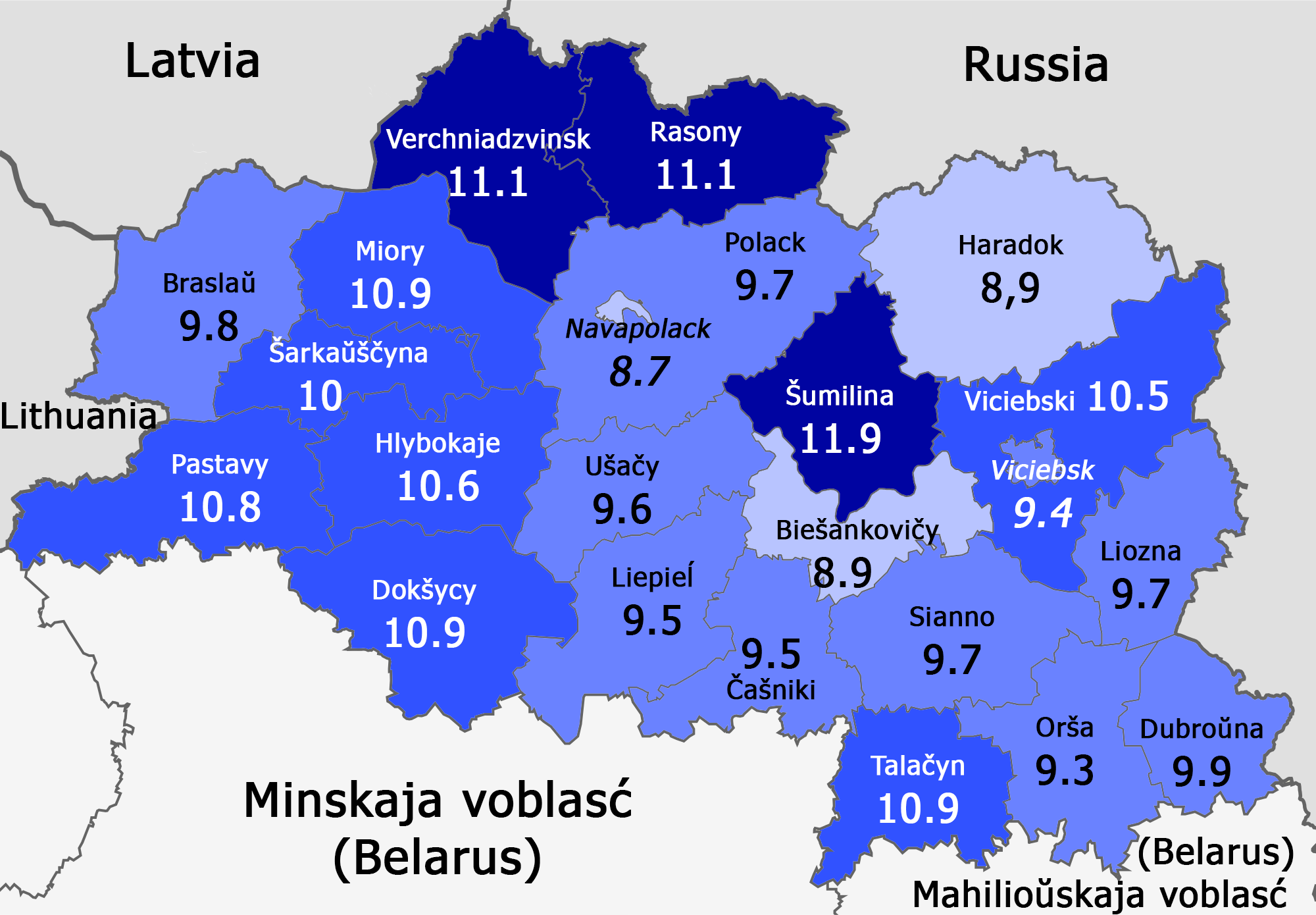
Birth rate by district (2017)

== Notable people ==
People from Vitebsk region:

- Elvin Mohhubat oglu Aliyev (born 2000), Azerbaijani footballer (Novopolotsk)
- Tamara Alpeyeva (born 1949), Belarusian philosopher (Lyepye)
- Andrey Arkhipaw (born 1995), Belarusian footballer (Postavy)
- Zair Azgur (1908–1995), Soviet and Belarusian sculptor (Mogilev Governorate)
- Mikhail Babichev (born 1995), Belarusian footballer (Postavy)
- Jan Barszczewski (1797–1851), Polish and Belarusian poet (possibly?)
- Dzmitry Barysaw (born 1995), Belarusian footballer (Novopolotsk)
- Vladimir Beneshevich (1874–1938), Russian scholar (Druya)
- Eliezer Ben-Yehuda (1858–1922), Belarusian lexicographer of the first Hebrew dictionary (Luzhki)
- Mikhail Borodin (1884–1951), Belarusian bolshevik revolutionary (Janavičy)
- Celine Borzecka (1833–1913), Belarusian Catholic nun (Antowil)
- Reuben Brainin (1862–1939), Russian Jewish publicist (Lyady)
- Petrus Brovka (1905–1980), Soviet Belarusian poet (Putilkovichi)
- Hienadz Buraukin (1936–2014), Belarusian poet and diplomat
- Kirill Chernook (born 2003), Belarusian footballer (Verkhnedvinsk)
- Jan Czerski (1845–1892), Polish geographer (Swolna)
- Klawdziy Duzh-Dushewski (1891–1959), Belarusian civil engineer, architect, diplomat and journalist
- Viktar Dashkevich (1945–2020), Belarusian stage actor (Viacicierawka)
- Uladzimir Dubouka (1900–1976), Belarusian poet (Vilna Governorate)
- Vladislav Glinsky (born 2000), Belarusian footballer (Polotsk)
- Dzmitry Girs (born 1997), Belarusian footballer (Chashniki)
- Aleksandr Titovich Golubev (1936–2020), Soviet and Russian intelligence officer (Pakhomlevichi)
- Lyudmila Gubkina (born 1973), Belarusian hammer thrower (Navapolatsk)
- Yefim Fomin (1909–1941), Soviet political commissar (Kałyški)
- Shneur Zalman Fradkin (1830–1902), Belarusian rabbi (Liadi)
- Aleksandr Frantsev (born 1997), Belarusian footballer (Novopolotsk)
- Alesia Furs (1925–2017), Belarusian independence movement member and Gulag prisoner (Aziarava)
- Yevgeny Ivanovsky (1918–1991), Soviet Army general (Chereya)
- Charles Jaffe (c.1879–1941), Belarusian-American chess master (Dubroŭna)
- Dzmitry Kamarowski (born 1986), Belarusian footballer (Orsha)
- Bronislav Kaminski (1899–1944), Russian anti-communist collaborationist (Polotsk region)
- Vladislav Kalinin (born 2002), Belarusian footballer (Novalukoml)
- Yawhen Kalinin (born 1993), Belarusian footballer (Lepel)
- Uladzislaw Kasmynin (born 1990), Belarusian footballer (Novopolotsk)
- Dzyanis Kavalewski (born 1992), Belarusian footballer (Orsha)
- Viktor Kazantsev (1946–2021), Russian Presidential envoy (Kokhanovo)
- Volha Khizhynkova (born 1986), Belarusian beauty pageant contestant
- Nastassia Kinnunen (born 1985), Finnish biathlete and cross-country skier (Haradok)
- Georgy Kondratyev (born 1960), Belarusian football coach (Lyubanichi)
- Roman Krivulkin (born 1996), Belarusian footballer (Lisuny)
- Viktor Kurentsov (1941–2021), Soviet weightlifter (Tukhinka)
- Yuri Kurilsky (1979–2007), Belarusian serial killer and rapist (Novopolotsk)
- Syarhey Kuzminich (born 1977), Belarusian football coach (Senno)
- Yuliy Kuznetsov (born 2003), Belarusian footballer (Novopolotsk)
- Nadia Khodasevich Léger (1904–1982), French artist (Asiecišča)
- Andrei Lodis (born 1980), Belarusian former footballer (Ushachy)
- Pyotr Lysenko (1931–2020), Belarusian archeologist (Zarechany)
- Henadzi Makhveyenia (born 1983), Belarusian weightlifter (Dubrowna)
- Tatyana Marinenko (1920–1942), Soviet NKVD intelligence officer (Sukhoi Bor)
- Yaakov Ben Zion Mendelson (1875–1941), Latvian Jewish scholar (Jēkabpils)
- Helen Michaluk (born 1930), only female head of the Association of Belarusians in Great Britain (Lonskija)
- Gennady Mikhasevich (1947–1987), Soviet serial killer and rapist (Ist)
- Anna Missuna (1868–1922), Russian-born Polish geologist
- Roman Pasevich (born 1999), Belarusian footballer (Vidzy)
- Vladimir Platonov (born 1939), Soviet mathematician (Stayki Village)
- Yevgeniy Prokopchik (born 1993), Belarusian footballer (Brawslaw)
- Anton Putsila (born 1987), Belarusian footballer (Orsha)
- Andrei Ravkov (born 1967), Lt. General of the Armed Forces of Belarus (Revyaki)
- Alexander Lukashenko (born 1954), President of Belarus
- Aleksander Rayevsky (1957–2008), Russian test pilot (Pastavy)
- Lavon Rydleŭski (1903–1953), Belarusian independence movement participant (Uljanavičy)
- Aliaksandr Shakutsin (born 1959), Belarusian businessman (Orsha District)
- Syarhey Shastakow (born 1997), Belarusian footballer (Polotsk)
- Terenty Shtykov (1907–1964), Soviet general (Liubki)
- Paval Sieviaryniec (born 1976), Belarusian journalist and Christian democrat (Vorsha)
- Ceslaus Sipovich (1914–1981), bishop of BHKC (near Braslaw)
- Yan Skibsky (born 2002), Belarusian footballer (Chashniki)
- Uladzimir Syanko (born 1946), Belarusian diplomat (Chashniki Raion)
- Zachar Šybieka (born 1948), Belarusian historian and professor (Asinauka)
- Mariya Trubach (born 1999), Belarusian rhythmic gymnast (Vitebsk)
- Tamara Tyshkevich (1931–1997), Soviet shot putter (Ikonki)
- Dzianis Urad (born 1991), Belarusian former Armed Forces special liaison officer (Rassony)
- Artur Vader (1920–1978), Chairman of the Presidium of the Supreme Soviet of the Estonian Soviet Socialist Republic (Gorbovo)
- Dmitry Vashkel (born 1993), Belarusian footballer (Sharkawshchyna)
- Boris Volin (1886–1957), Soviet historian (Hlybokaye)
- Syarhey Volkaw (born 1999), Belarusian footballer (Polotsk)
- Roman Volkov (born 1987), Belarusian footballer (Novopolotsk)
- Rostislav Vovkushevsky (1917–2000), Soviet realist painter (Polotsk)
- Pavel Yaguzhinsky (1683–1736), Russian statesman (Kublici)
- Gleb Zheleznikov (born 1997), Belarusian footballer (Orsha)
- Chaim Zhitlowsky (1865–1943), Belarusian writer and philosopher (Ushachy)
- Solomon Zeitlin (1886/92–1976), Belarusian historian (Chashniki)
- Yefrosinya Zenkova (1923–1984), Soviet secretary of the "Young Avengers" (Ushaly Village)
