= Belarusian national revival =

Belarusian social, cultural and political movement

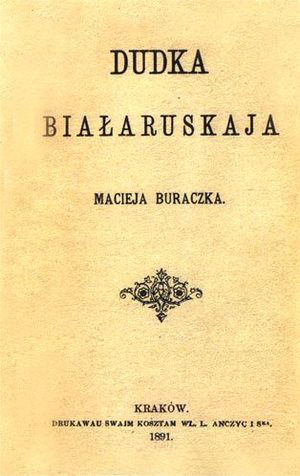
Dudka Bialaruskaja, an 1891 book of poems by Francišak Bahuševič

The Belarusian national revival (Belarusian: Беларускае нацыянальнае адраджэнне), otherwise known as the Belarusian National Awakening is a social, cultural and political movement that advocates the revival of Belarusian culture, language, customs, and the creation of the Belarusian statehood at the national foundation.

In the early and mid 19th century, Jan Czeczot, Wladyslaw Syrokomla, Wincenty Dunin-Marcinkiewicz, Jan Barszczewski and several other writers, most of whom represented the local nobility, created the first literary works in modern Belarusian language. Their works were written in local rural dialects and ignored the traditions of the written Old Belarusian language from the period of the Grand Duchy of Lithuania. For example, the first Belarusian language newspaper, Mužyckaja prauda, was printed in 1862-1863 using Latin script by Kastuś Kalinoŭski, the Father of the Belarusian Nation.

In the second half of the 19th century, leftist national clubs emerged among Belarusian students in the major universities of the Russian Empire, i.e. in the University of St. Petersburg. These clubs issued several illegal publications, for example, Homan with demands for autonomy or independence for Belarus. Ignacy Hryniewiecki, the assassin of Tsar Alexander II of Russia, according to some historians, was one of the creators of the Belarusian faction in the Russian socialist movement Narodnaya Volya.

== See also ==
- Litvinism
- Belarusian nationalism
- Union of Belarusian Patriots
- Russification of Belarus
