= Union of Belarusian Patriots =

Belarusian nationalistic youth organisation

The Union of Belarusian Patriots or UBP (Belarusian: Саюз беларускіх патрыётаў or Зьвяз беларускіх патрыётаў) was a youth organization active in West and Northern Belarus from 1946 to 1947.

The main objectives were to improve welfare, Belarusian national revival, protect national and civil rights and saving the Belarusian language from Russification. The ultimate goal was to build an independent Belarusian state.

== History ==
The Union of Belarusian Patriots was founded in early 1946 in the Hlybokaye and Pastavy. In the summer of 1946, an underground patriotic organization formed in Slonim whose conspiratorial name was "Seagull". It was founded by young teachers and activists. During this year, these communities were in Baranavichy, Brest, Navahrudak and Zhyrovichy.

In the summer of 1946 the communities of Baranavichy, Slonim and Navahrudak united in the center of Belarusian Liberation Movement under the leadership of Vasil Suprun. In the summer of 1947 a regional management structure was founded. It was headed by Alyaxandar Bareyka (Baranavichy Region), Mikola Makarevich (Brest Region), Syarhei Yanousky (Molodechno Region) and Mikola Lyaskavets (Pinsk Region). At the same time, the final name of the movement was decided – "The Union of Belarusian Patriots".

In the winter of 1947 the organization was liquidated by Soviet security organs. Two military tribunals were held, in Baranavichy and in Minsk. Members of the organisation were accused of anti-Soviet activity and punished by executions, camps and prison.

== Members ==
- Alesia Furs
