= Lake Abakrytseli =

- Abakrytsele
- Возера Абакрыцелі (Belarusian)
- Location within Belarus
- Location: Belarus
- Coordinates: 55.5122°N 26.7592°E
- Type: lake
- Max. length: 0.52 kilometres (0.32 mi)
- Max. width: 0.4 kilometres (0.25 mi)
- Surface area: 0.16 square kilometres (0.062 sq mi)

Lake Abakrytseli or Abakrytsele (Belarusian: Возера Абакрыцелі) is a lake in the Braslau Lakes National Park of northern Belarus. With a length of 0.52 kilometres (0.32 mi) and maximum width of 0.4 kilometres (0.25 mi), Abakrytseli is a small lake measuring 0.16 square kilometres (0.062 sq mi). It has a basin area of 2.25 square kilometres (0.87 sq mi).
