= Sosny, Minsk =

Suburb of Minsk, Belarus

Coordinates: 52°35′N 27°59′E

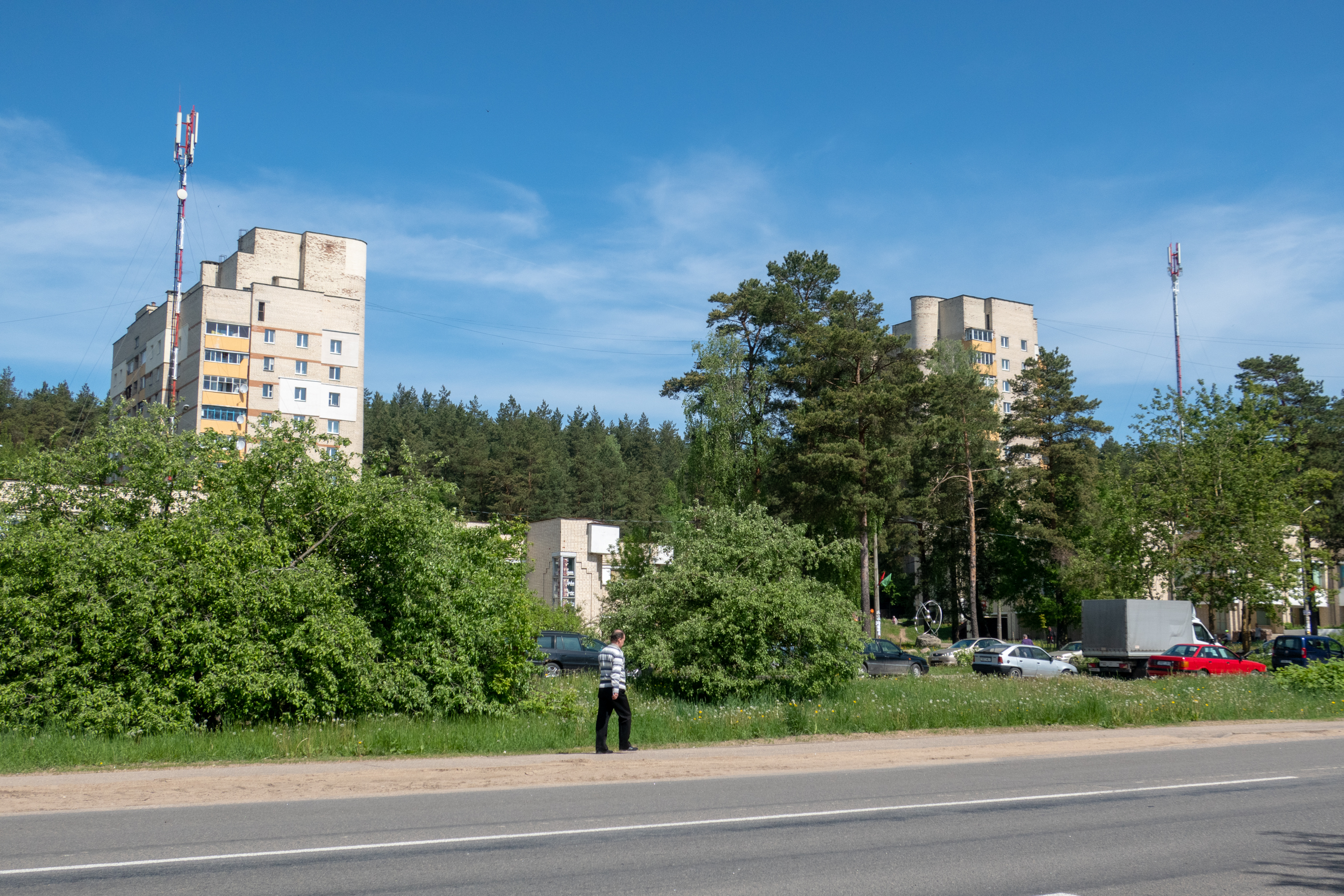
Sosny

Sosny (Belarusian: Сосны; English translation - Pines), a part of the Zavodski District of Minsk, is a suburb approximately 15 kilometers outside of the centre of Minsk, Belarus. Hidden in the tall Minsk pines, Sosny has a population of about 3,000. Until 1991, Sosny was home to a scientific nuclear reactor that was used for both military and civil purposes.
