= Alesia Furs =

Belarusian activist

- Алеся Фурс
- Born: 11 January 1925; Aziarava, Vilna Province, Second Polish Republic
- Died: 19 August 2017 (aged 92)
- Organization: Union of Belarusian Patriots
- Spouse: Anton Furs

Alesia Furs (Belarusian: Алеся Фурс, née Umpirovič; 11 January 1925 - 19 August 2017) was a member of the Belarusian independence movement and Anti-Soviet resistance and a Gulag prisoner.

== Early life ==
Alesia Umpirovič was born into a large peasant family in the village of Aziarava, Vilna Province in the northeast of the Second Polish Republic (now Viciebsk Region of Belarus). She went to a Polish and then Belarusian school.

== Anti-Soviet resistance and later life ==
In the autumn of 1945, Furs was actively involved in the establishment of an underground group “For Belarus” (Belarusian: За Беларусь), which later merged into the Union of Belarusian Patriots, UBP (Belarusian: Саюз беларускіх патрыётаў).

In February 1947, the Soviet Secret Police managed to infiltrate the underground organisation. Furs was arrested in May 1948 and received a 25-year sentence in the Gulag forced labour camps. In May of that year her father, Lavon Umpirovič, was sentenced to 10 years in prison for ‘failure to alert the authorities’ and died in incarceration.

While in the Gulag, Furs became friends with Belarusian poet Larysa Hienijuš. She was released from the Gulag following the death of Stalin and in June 1956 married Anton Furs, a fellow UBP member. She lived in Kazakhstan and returned to Belarus on retirement in 1982.

Furs was exonerated in November 1992 and published her memoirs in a number of Belarusian periodicals.

She died on 19 August 2017. In the last few years of her life Furs was seriously ill but never regretted the sacrifices she made in her youth. “I would not have changed anything in my life. My life is what was given to me by God. Otherwise, it would have been necessary to betray my friends” - she said in her interview with TUT.BY in 2014.
