= Braslaw district =

District of Vitebsk region, Belarus

Braslaw district Браслаўскі раён (Belarusian)
- District
- Flag Coat of arms

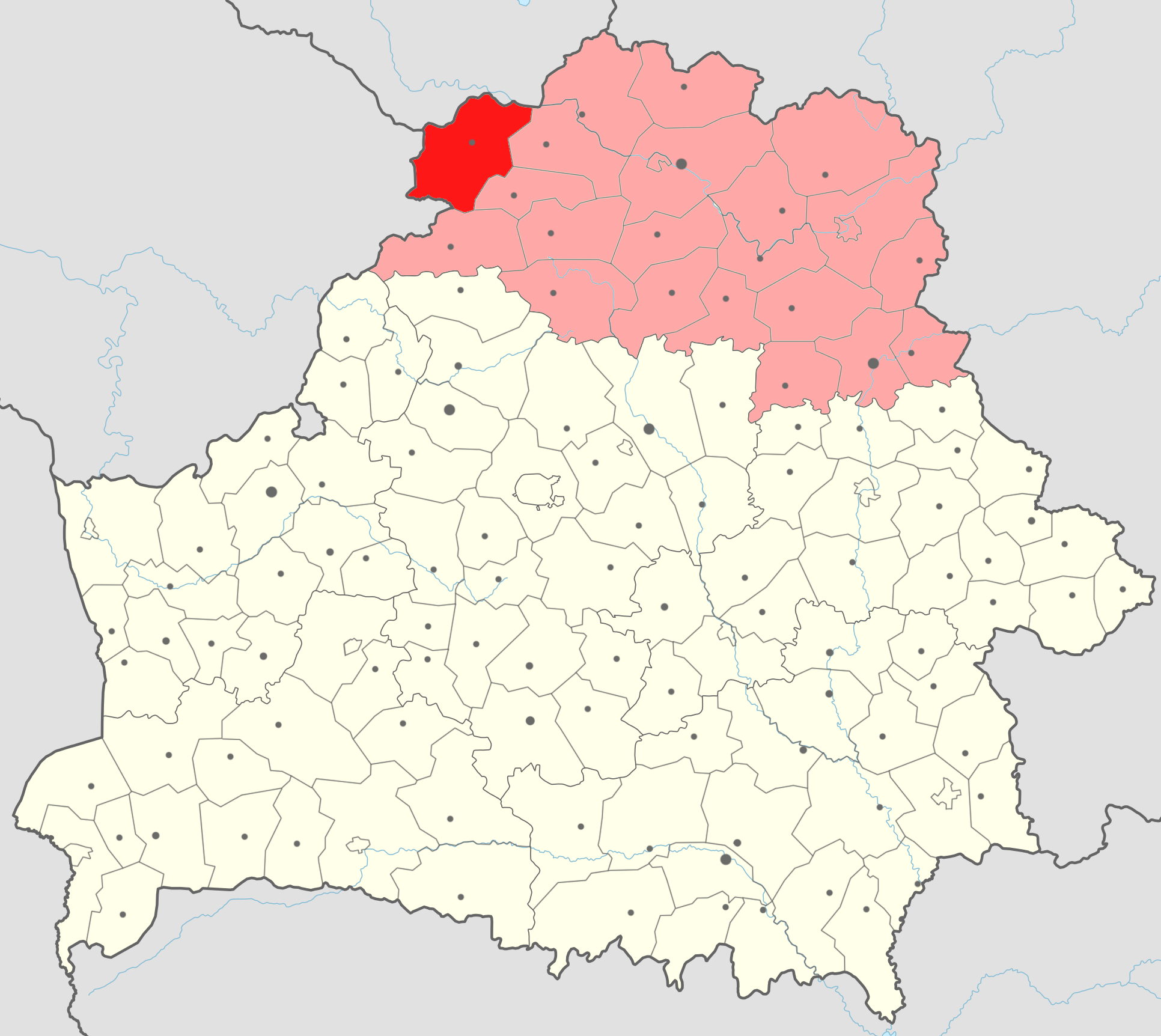
- Coordinates: 55°38′36″N 27°03′41″E
- Country: Belarus
- Region: Vitebsk region
- Administrative center: Braslaw

Area
  - Total: 2,270 km^{2} (880 sq mi)
- Elevation: 131 m (430 ft)

Population (2023)
  - Total: 23,428
  - Density: 10.3/km^{2} (26.7/sq mi)
- Time zone: UTC+3 (MSK)

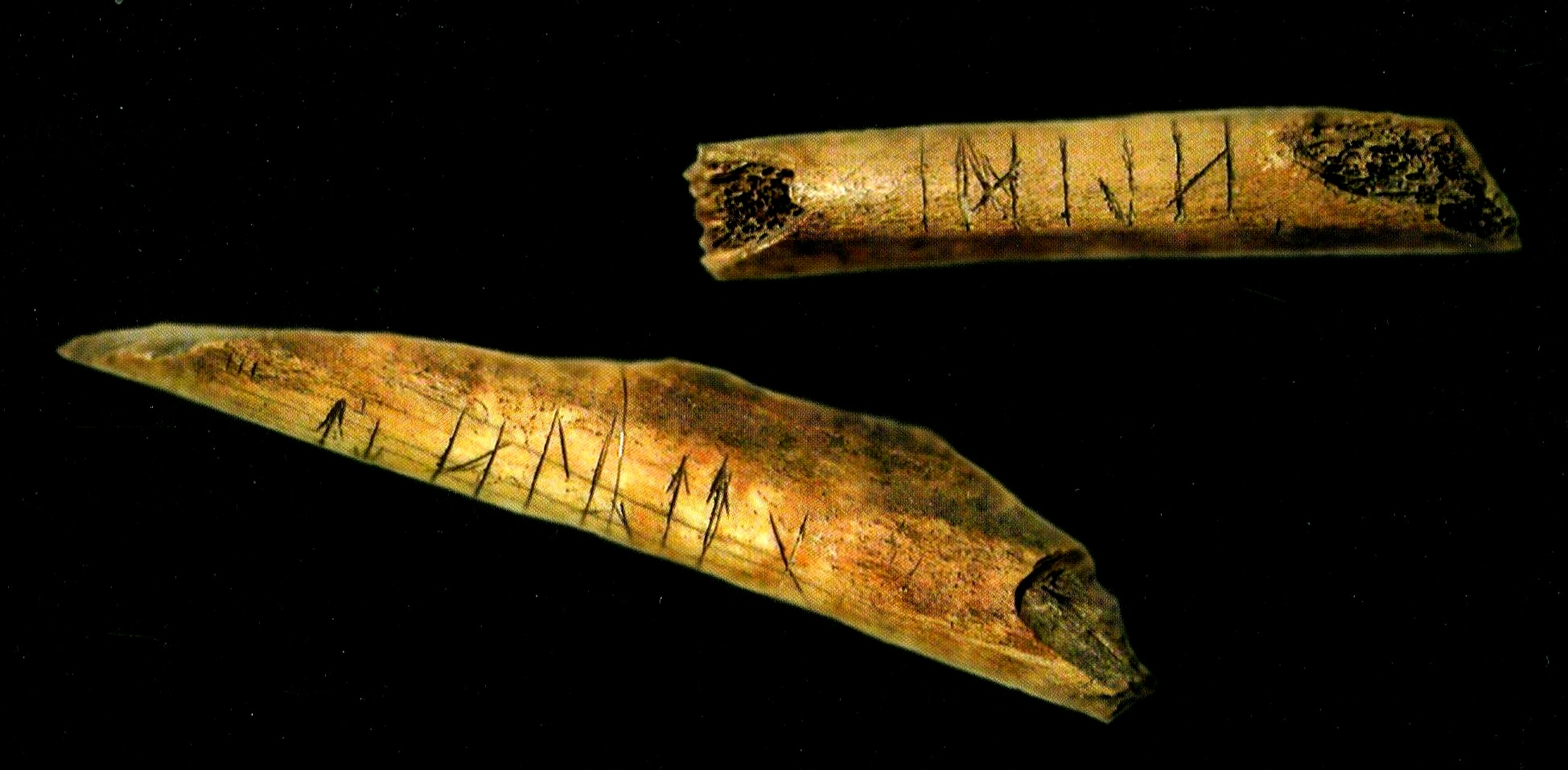
Two 12th–13th c. runic inscriptions from Maskovichi

Braslaw district or Braslaŭ district (Belarusian: Браслаўскі раён; Russian: Браславский район) is a district (raion) of Vitebsk region in Belarus. Its administrative centre is Braslaw.

The district is known for its numerous lakes. The national park and popular tourist region Braslaw Lakes is situated here. The four largest lakes here are Dryvyaty (the fifth largest in Belarus), Snudy (the ninth largest in Belarus), Strusta (the sixteenth largest in Belarus) and Rychy (the seventeenth largest in Belarus).

== Notable residents ==
- Alesia Furs (1925, Aziarava village - 2017), member of the Belarusian independence movement and Anti-Soviet resistance and a Gulag prisoner.
- Tomasz Wawrzecki (1753, Mejšty estate –1816), politician and military commander.
