= Homan (1884) =

Belarusian newspaper

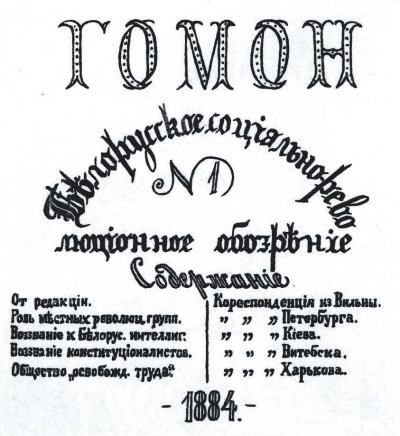
Homan newspaper, 1884

Homan (pronounced [ˈɣoman]) was an illegal Belarusian newspaper published from 1884 in Belarusian and Russian languages. It was printed in Minsk on a hectograph and promoted the idea of autonomy of Belarus.
