= Snudy Lake =

Lake in Vitebsk Region, Belarus

Snudy
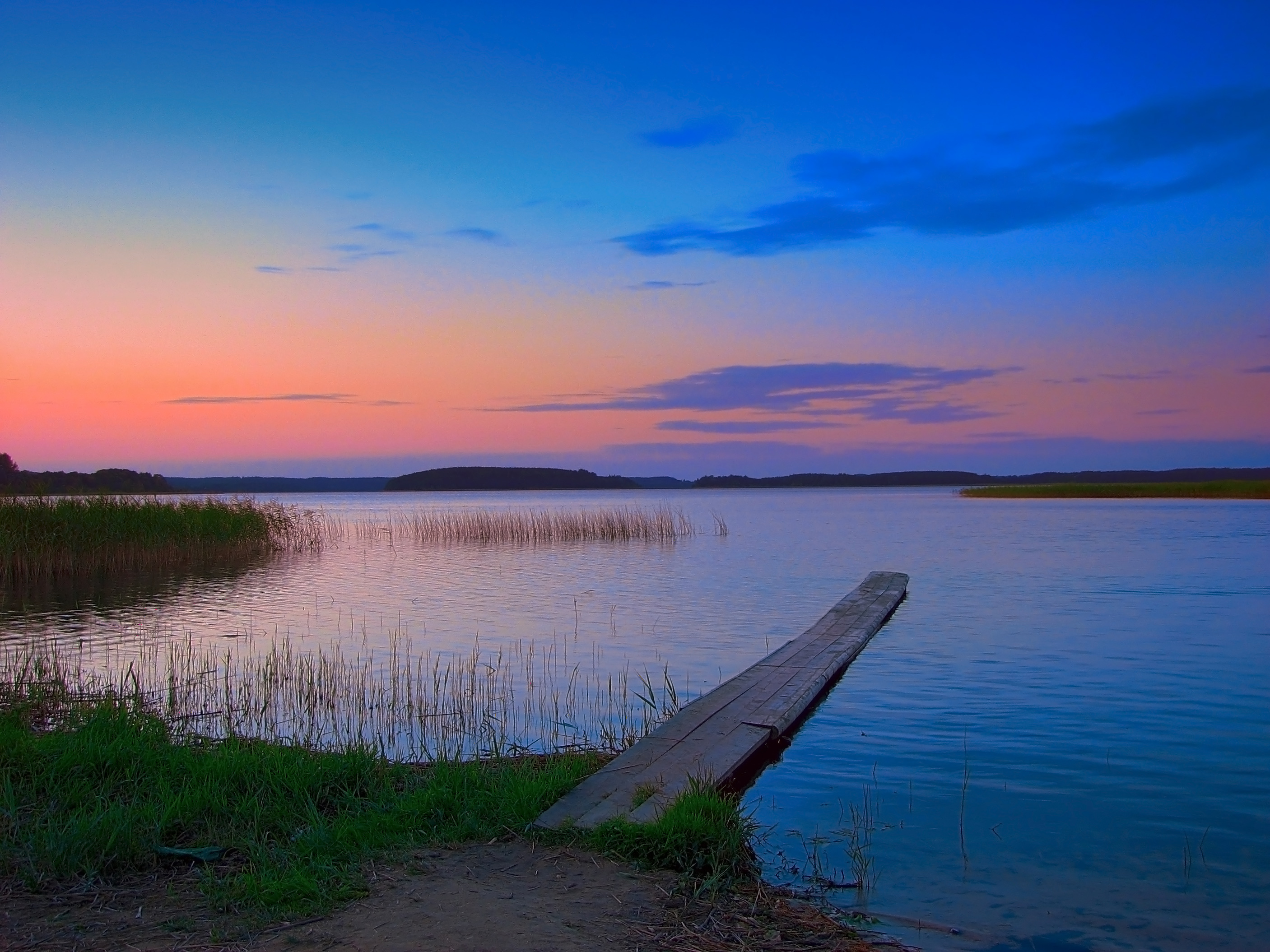

- Location within Belarus
- Location: Braslaw District, Vitebsk Region, Belarus
- Coordinates: 55.747°N 27.063°E
- Lake type: freshwater
- Surface area: 22.0 km^{2} (8.5 sq mi)
- Average depth: 4.9 m (16 ft)
- Max. depth: 16.5 m (54 ft)

Lake Snudy (Belarusian: Снуды́, Lithuanian: Snudai) is a freshwater lake in the Braslaw District of Vitebsk Region in northern Belarus. Snudy is the second largest of the Braslaw Lakes and the 9th largest in the country. When full, it has a surface area of 22 km².
