= Braslaw Lakes =

Natural park in Belarus

Braslaw Lakes National Park
- Нацыянальны парк "Браслаўскія азёры" (Belarusian)
- IUCN category II (national park)
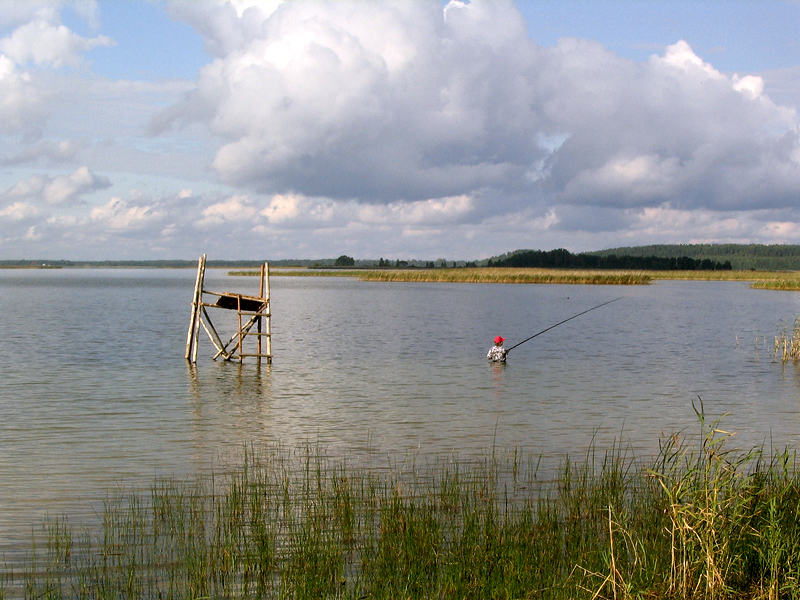
- Lake Snudy

- Location within Belarus
- Coordinates: 55°35′46″N 27°03′14″E
- Established: 1995

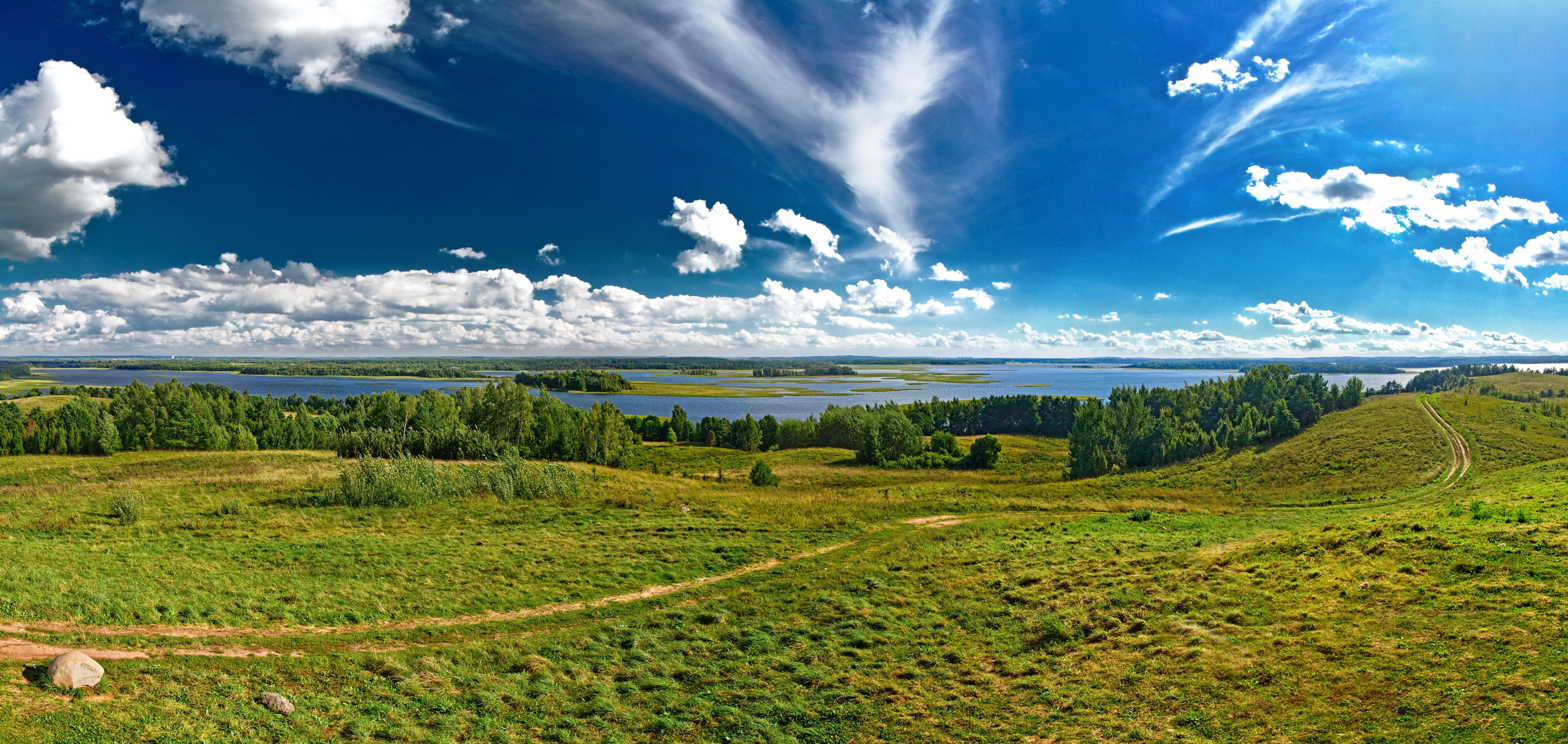
Lake Strusta

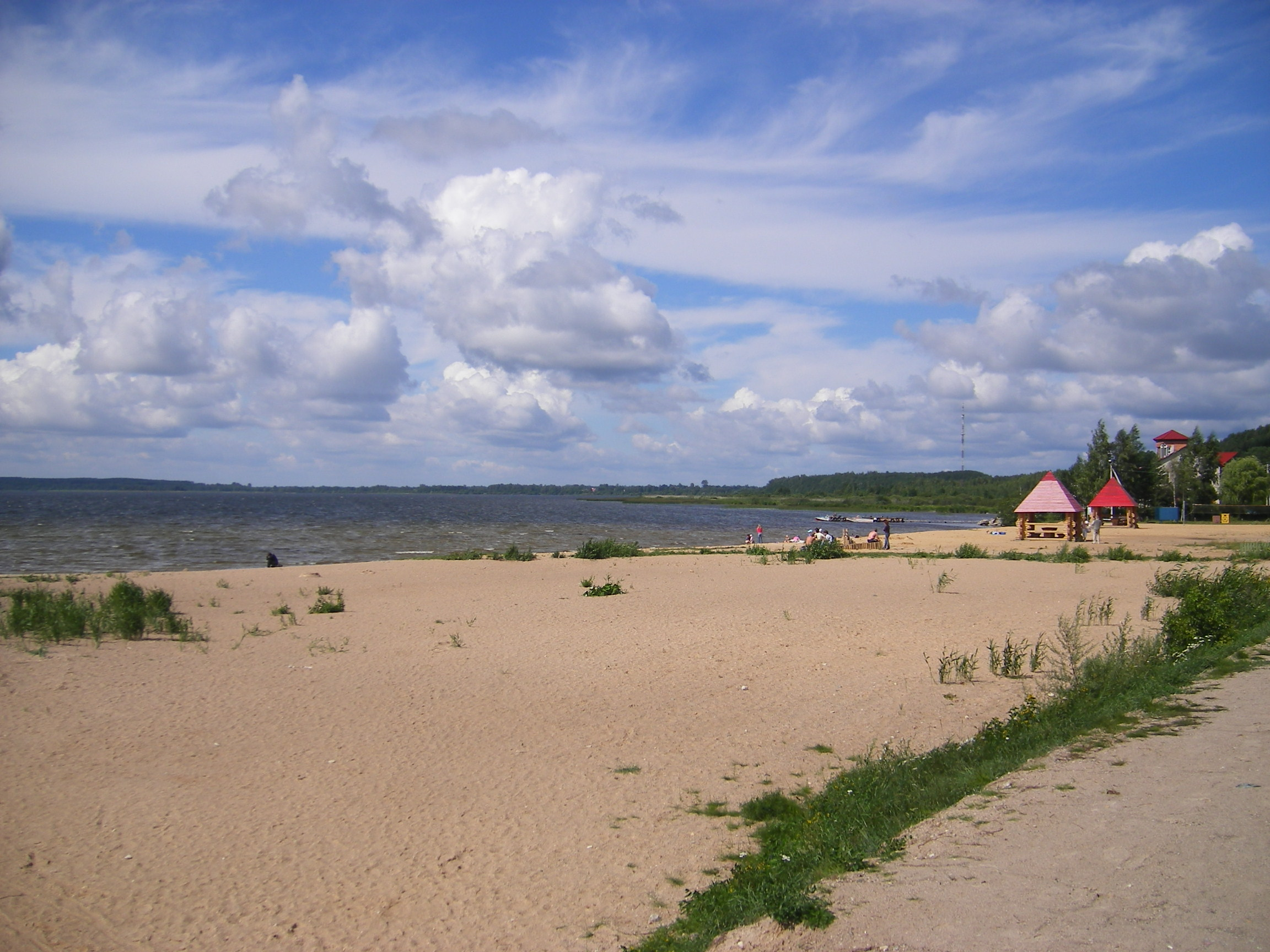
Lake Dryvyaty

Braslaw Lakes (Belarusian: Браслаўскія азёры, tr. Braslawskiya azyory; Russian: Браславские озёра, romanized: Braslavskiye ozyora) is one of the four national parks in Belarus. The national park was set up in September 1995. It is a unique ecosystem with a number of lakes and a large area of pine forests. Spanning an area of about 700 km^{2} (270 sq mi), the national park includes 30 lakes. The three largest lakes are Dryvyaty (fifth largest in the country), Snudy (ninth largest in the country) and Strusta (sixteenth largest in the country).

== Location ==
The territory of the national park is separate and is in the Braslaw Raion in the northwest of Belarus, near the border with Lithuania. In the north it is adjacent to Belarusian-Latvian border. The park is elongated from southwest to northeast. In this direction it is 55 km (34 mi) long and between 5 and 29 km (3.1 and 18.0 mi) wide. The total area of the park is 691 km^{2} (267 sq mi). The southern part of the park consists of lowlands covered with forests. Much of the area is occupied by different types of bogs. There are several beautiful forest lakes, including Boginskoye - considered to be one of the most beautiful in the Braslav area. The forests here belong to coniferous-deciduous group, and occupy 310 km^{2} (120 sq mi). One can distinguish the following woodlands: Borunsky, Belmont, Boguinsky, Druiskaya Dacha. Pine woods and fir woods are widespread.

== History ==
Through the latest glacial period, about 18,000-29,000 years ago, the area of Braslav Lakes was covered with vast ice fields, up to several hundred metres thick. As the climate warmed, the ice slowly melted and the limit of the ice moved north. This complex process shaped the characteristic features of the nature of Poozerye with its hilly relief and lakes.

== Geography ==
There is a network of 30 connected large and small lakes, spread over an area of 114 km^{2} (44 sq mi). The biggest lakes are Drivyaty, Snudy, Strusto, Voiso, Volosovo, Nedrovo, Nespish, and Berezhe. This group of lakes makes up the core of the Braslav Lakes National Park.

== Animals and plants ==
Of the rare species listed in the Belarusian Red Book, the area is the home of the badger, lynx, brown bear, and swan. The swan was almost extinct in this area but now inhabits the Braslav lakes. Other native species include the black stork, common crane, silver seagull, willow grouse, and dunlin. The lakes of Braslav are rich with different kinds of fish. Pike perch, bream, whitebait, tench, whitefish are widespread. Eel is of special value. Also widespread are boar, roe deer, squirrel, brown and white hare, fox, raccoon, wolf, marten, otter, and mink.

== See also ==
- Lake Abakrytseli
- Lake Ikazn
- Lake Ilmenak
