= Braslaw =

Town in Vitebsk Region, Belarus

Braslaw: Браслаў (Belarusian); Браслав (Russian)
- Town
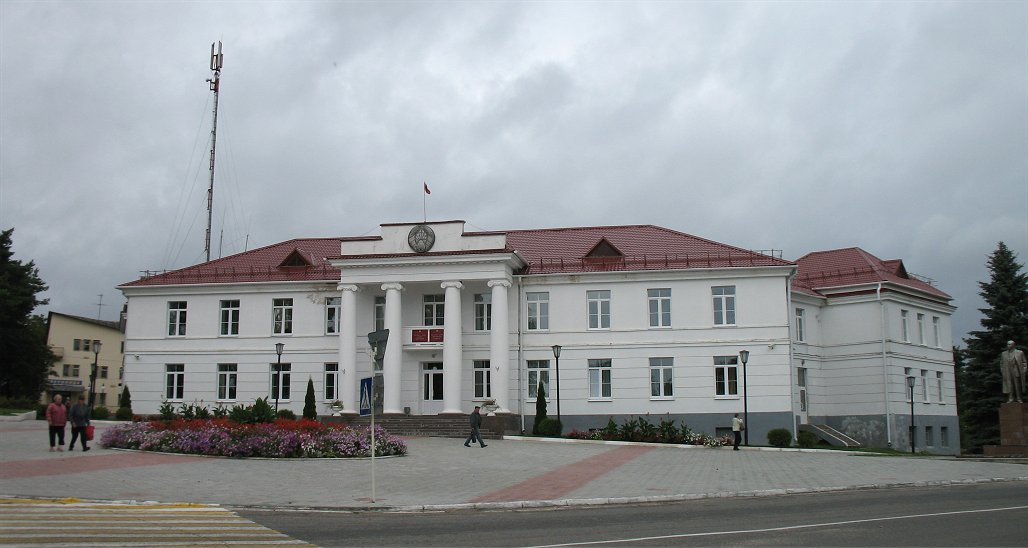

- Flag Coat of arms

- Location within Belarus
- Coordinates: 55°38′20.82″N 27°1′54.58″E
- Country: Belarus
- Region: Vitebsk Region
- District: Braslaw District
- First mentioned: 1065

Population (2025)
  - Total: 9,338
- Time zone: UTC+3 (MSK)
- Postal code: 211969
- Area code: +375 2153
- License plate: 2
- Website: braslav.vitebsk-region.gov.by

Braslaw or Braslav (Note: Belarusian: Браслаў, romanized: Braslaŭ; Russian: Браслав; Lithuanian: Breslauja; Polish: Brasław.) is a town in Vitebsk Region, Belarus. It serves as the administrative center of Braslaw District. As of 2025, it has a population of 9,338.

== Etymology ==
The town's name is derived from the East Slavonic name *Braslavъ, which is composed of the Slavic anthroponomical –jь, resulting in Braslaw.

== History ==
The town was first mentioned in 1065 as a castle in the border of the Principality of Polotsk with the Lithuanian tribes. Archaeologists excavated a Viking settlement in the village of Maskachichy not far from the town. They believe that Viking mercenaries were used as dependable border guards. In the 14th century, Braslaw was incorporated into the Grand Duchy of Lithuania and, in fact, became an important fortification near the disturbing line with the Livonian Order in the 14th and 15th centuries. Polish historian Krzysztof Pietkiewicz, based on archival data from the turn of the 15th and 16th centuries, describes Braslaw surroundings as a 'Ruthenian linguistic area' (na ruskim obszarze językowym). In 1500, Alexander Jagiellon privileged the townsfolk with limited self-administration rights and a coat of arms. In 1506, the castle was presented to the widowed queen Yelena Ivanovna, the daughter of Ivan III of Russia and wife of Alexander Jagiellon, who founded an Orthodox Christian nunnery there. The town was much developed thanks to its praepostor Lew Sapieha and the king Stanisław August Poniatowski.

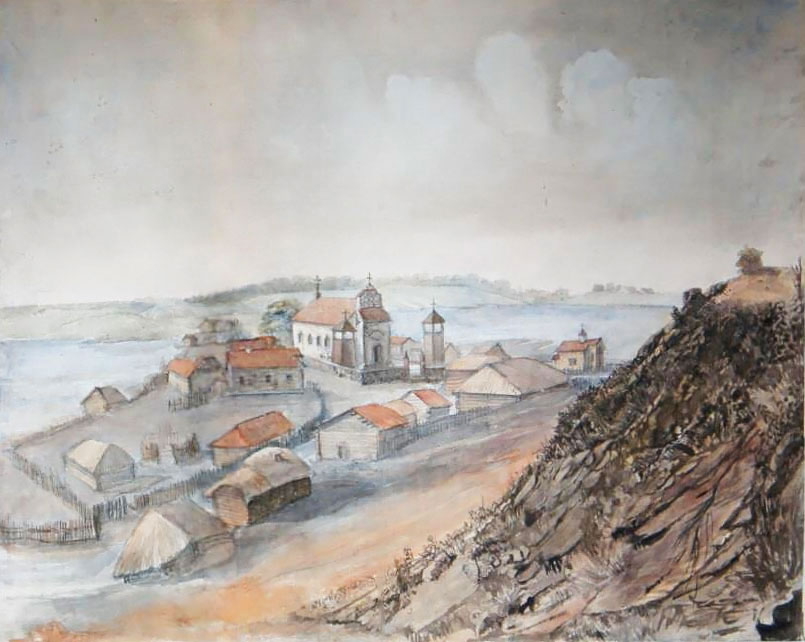
View of Braslaw from Braslawski Castle (1864) by Dmitry Strukov

From 1795 to 1919, Braslaw was part of Russian Empire. After the Third Partition of Poland, Braslaw became an uyezd center (county seat) in Vilna Governorate in 1795, later in Kovno Governorate in 1843, except during the brief French occupation in 1812. It was occupied by the German Empire for 10 months in 1918. According to the Treaty of Riga, it became part of the Second Polish Republic. It was a powiat center (county seat) in Wilno Voivodeship. In the 1921 Polish census, 56.8% people declared Jewish nationality, 34.9% declared Polish nationality, and 7.8% declared Belarusian nationality.

Around 3,000 Jews lived in Braslaw at the eve of World War II, more than the half of the inhabitants. In 1939, eastern Poland was annexed by the Soviet Union and the town became part of the Byelorussian Soviet Socialist Republic. It was occupied by Nazi Germany between 27 June 1941 and 6 June 1944 and administered as a part of the Generalbezirk Weißruthenien of Reichskommissariat Ostland. In April 1942, a ghetto was established. The liquidation of the ghetto began on 3 June 1942. Many Jews tried to escape but around 2,000 Jews were arrested and shot in ditches that had been prepared. In late 1942, the Jews from the nearby village of Opsa were gathered in Braslaw. They were killed in March 1943.

It was a raion center, first in Vileyka Region, then in Polotsk Region between 1944 and 1954 and finally in Molodechno Region between 1954 and 1960 before passing to Vitebsk. Since the 1920s, Braslaw has developed as a cheap summer resort. In 1995, it accommodated the main office of the National Park of the Braslaw Lakes.

== Population ==
In 1948, Braslaw had a population in excess of 2,000 people.

In 2009, the total population of Braslaw was 9,516 people. In 2023, this dropped to 9,426, then to 9,419 in 2024. As of 2025, it has a population of 9,338. A small number of Lithuanians live in the villages around the town Distribution of the population by ethnicity according to the 2009 census:

	percent
Belarusians	73.33%
Poles	12.52%
Russians	12.37%
Ukrainians	0.95%
Tatars	0.25%
Latvians	0.19%
