= List of Belarusian artists =

Below is an alphabetical list of notable artists who were born and/or worked in Belarus.

== A ==
- Michał Elwiro Andriolli (1836–1893)
- Meer Akselrod (1902–1970), painter
- Zair Azgur (1908–1995), sculptor

== B ==
- Vitold Byalynitsky-Birulya (1872–1957)
- Peter Blume (1906–1992), painter and sculptor
- Abraham Bogdanove (1888–1946)

== C ==
- Marc Chagall (1887–1985)
- Jacques Chapiro (1887–1972)
- Natalia Chernogolova (born 1954)
- Ludmila Christeseva (born 1978)

== D ==
- Jonas Damelis (1780–1840), painter
- Mai Dantsig (1930–2017)
- Elena Drobychevskaja (b. 1968), graphic artist
- Dovgyallo Mikhail Hrisanfovich (1908-1978) painting (The best painter of his time)
- Dovgyallo Oleg Mikhailovich (1940-2000) painting

== E ==
- Aleksandra Ekster (1882–1949)

== G ==
- Leon Gaspard (1882–1964)
- Giovanni Battista Gisleni (1600–1672)

== K ==
- Morris Kantor (1896–1974)
- Anatoli Lvovich Kaplan (1902–1980), painter, sculptor and printmaker
- Kandrat Karsalin (1809–c.1883), portrait painter
- Pavel Kastusik (b. 1976)
- Michel Kikoine (1892–1968), painter
- Katarzyna Kobro (1898–1951)
- Irina Kotova (b. 1976)
- Pinchus Kremegne (1890–1981)
- Victor Kopach (b. 1970)
- Dmitry Kustanovich (b. 1970), amateur artist

== L ==
- Jacques Lipchitz (1891–1973)
- El Lissitzky (1890–1941)

== P ==
- Yehuda Pen (1854–1937)
- Antoine Pevsner (1886–1962)

== R ==
- Alexandr Rodin (b. 1947), contemporary painter
- Alfred Isidore Romer (1832–1897), painter, sculptor, carver and medalist
- Ferdynand Ruszczyc (1878–1936)

== S ==
- Mikhail Savitsky (1922–2010)
- William S. Schwartz (1896–1977)
- Yauhen Shatokhin (1947–2012), painter
- Simon Segal (1898–1969)
- Lasar Segall (1891–1957)
- Francysk Skaryna (1490–1552)
- Joseph Solman (1909–2008)
- Chaïm Soutine (1893–1943)
- Wladyslaw Strzeminski (1893–1953)

== V ==
- Sergey Voychenko (1955–2004), poster artist

== Z ==
- Boris Zaborov (1935–2021)
- Ossip Zadkine (1890–1967)
- Sergey Zaryanko (1818–1871), portrait painter
- Ilia Zdanevich (1894–1974)
- Stanislav Zhukovsky (1873–1944)
