= Viktar Dashkevich =

Belarusian actor (1945–2020)

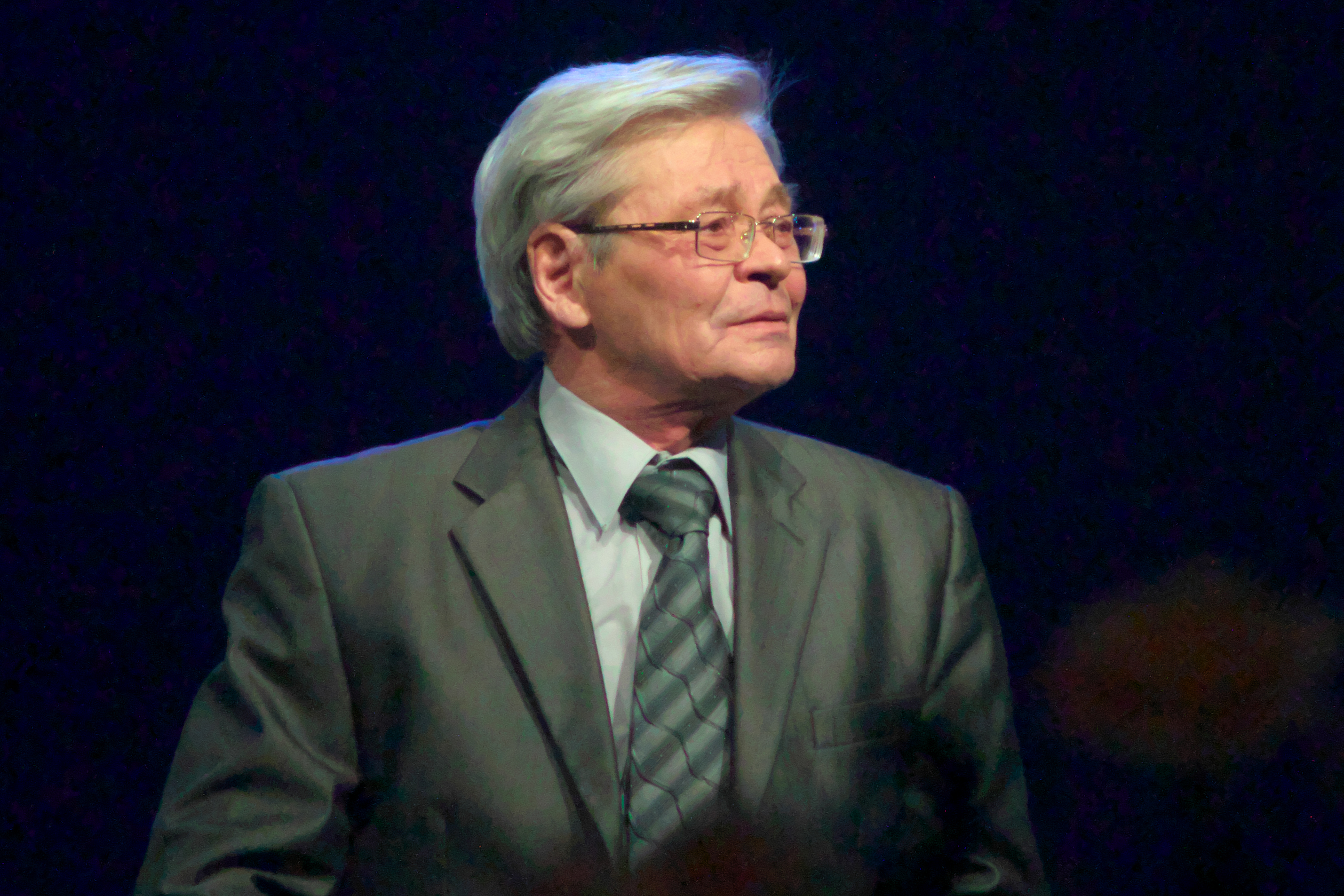
- Dashkevich in 2015
- Born: Viktar Mikalayevich Dashkevich; 3 January 1945; Viacicierawka, Chashniki District, Vitebsk Region, Byelorussian Soviet Socialist Republic, USSR
- Died: 31 March 2020 (aged 75); Vitebsk, Belarus
- Resting place: Orthodox Hieorhijeŭskija Cemetery
- Occupation: Actor
- Years active: 1973–2020
- Spouse: Sviatlana Dashkevich

Viktar Mikalayevich Dashkevich (Belarusian: Ві́ктар Мікала́евіч Дашке́віч; 3 January 1945 – 31 March 2020) was a Belarusian stage actor.

== Biography ==
Viktar Dashkevich was born in the Chashniki District, Vitebsk Region, Belarus, on January 3, 1945. In 1973, he graduated from the Belarusian State Academy of Arts. From 1973 to 1990, and after 1991, Dashkevich worked at the Yakub Kolas National Academic Drama Theater. From 1990 to 1991, he was Director of the Belarusian Theater "Lyalka" in Vitebsk. From 1981 to 1990, as well as from 1991 to 2007, Dashkevich served as the head of the troupe of the Yakub Kolas Theater. Dashkevich had been hospitalized with chronic lung disease and died in March 2020, in Vitebsk, after contracting COVID-19.

He is buried in the Orthodox Hieorhijeŭskija Cemetery near Ruba.

== Awards ==
- Francis Skaryna Medal (2010)
- Diploma of the Ministry of Culture of the Republic of Belarus (2016)
- Honored Artist of the Republic of Belarus (2016)
