= Novalukoml =

Town in Vitebsk Region, Belarus

Novalukoml: Новалукомль (Belarusian); Новолукомль (Russian); Novolukoml
- Town
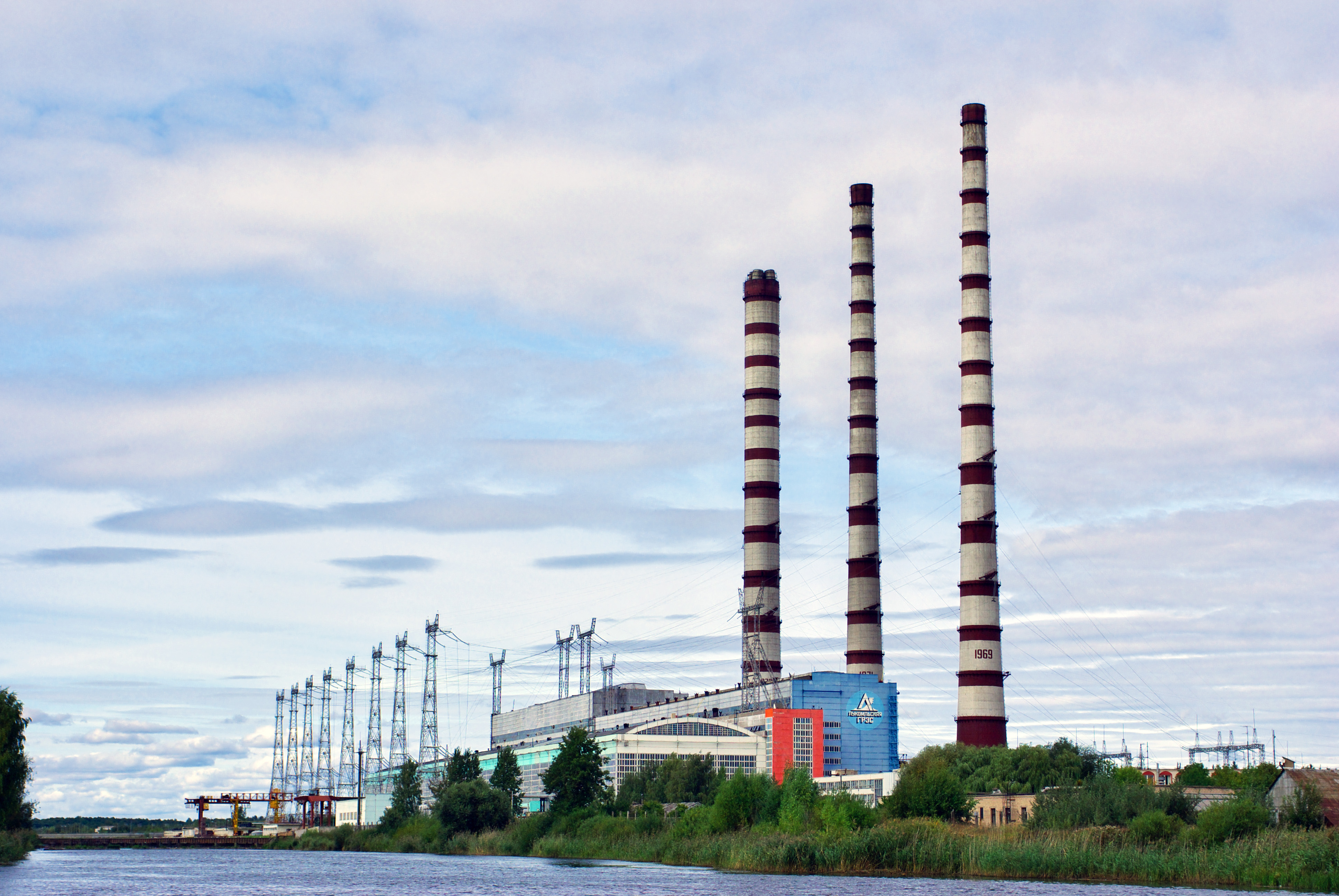
- Lukoml power station

- Flag Coat of arms

- Location within Belarus
- Coordinates: 54°39′25″N 29°09′00″E
- Country: Belarus
- Region: Vitebsk Region
- District: Chashniki District
- Founded: 1964
- Elevation: 166 m (545 ft)

Population (2025)
  - Total: 11,598
- Time zone: UTC+3 (MSK)
- Postal code: 211162
- Area code: +375 2133
- License plate: 2

Novalukoml or Novolukoml (Belarusian: Новалукомль, romanized: Novalukomĺ; Russian: Новолукомль) is a town in Chashniki District, Vitebsk Region, Belarus. It is situated by Lake Lukomlskoye. Lukoml Power Station is located in the town. As of 2025, it has a population of 11,598.

== History ==
The history of Novalukoml goes back to 1964 when the construction of the Lukoml power station began. The settlement by the name of Pionerny (Russian: Пионерный) was a temporary place of residence for the builders and the personnel of this natural gas-fired thermal power station.

In 1965 the settlement was renamed Novalukoml (lit. "New Lukoml") after the adjacent village of Lukoml which was said to be the center of a principality centuries ago.

When the station was finished, the settlement grew steadily and was given the status of a city in 1970. In 2006 the city was granted a coat of arms.
