= Aladau =

Aladau (Belarusian: Аладаў) is a Belarusian masculine surname, its feminine counterpart is Aladava (Аладава). In Russia, this surname is transliterated as Aladaov (Аладов, masculine) and Aladova (Аладова, feminine). The surname may refer to the following notable people:

- Alena Aladava (1907–1986), Belarusian art historian
- Nikolay Aladov (1890–1972), Belarusian composer, husband of Alena
- Ninel Aladova (born 1934), Belarusian architect
