= Alexander Subbotin =

Belarusian politician (born 1976)

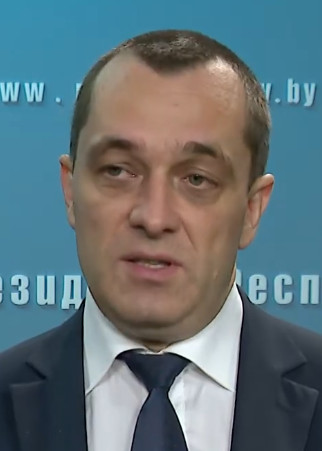
- Alexander Subbotin in 2020

Governor of the Vitebsk region
- Incumbent
- Assumed office 13 December 2021
- President: Alexander Lukashenko
- Preceded by: Nikolai Sherstnev

Deputy Prime Minister
- In office 4 June 2020 – 13 December 2021
- President: Alexander Lukashenko
- Prime Minister: Roman Golovchenko
- Preceded by: Vladimir Dvornik
- Succeeded by: Leonid Zayats

Personal details
- Born: 23 May 1976 (age 49) Ruba, Vitebsk region, Byelorussian SSR, Soviet Union

Alexander Mikhailovich Subbotin (Russian: Александр Михайлович Субботин; born 23 May 1976) is a Belarusian politician serving as governor of the Vitebsk region since 2021. From 2020 to 2021, he served as deputy prime minister.

== Early life and education ==
Alexander Subbotin was born on 23 May 1976 in Ruba, Vitebsk region.

== Personal life ==
He is married and has children.
