= Belarusian State Academy of Arts =

Public university in Minsk, Belarus

Coordinates: 53°55′22″N 27°36′04″E

- Беларуская дзяржаўная акадэмія мастацтваў (Belarusian); Белорусская государственная академия искусств (Russian)

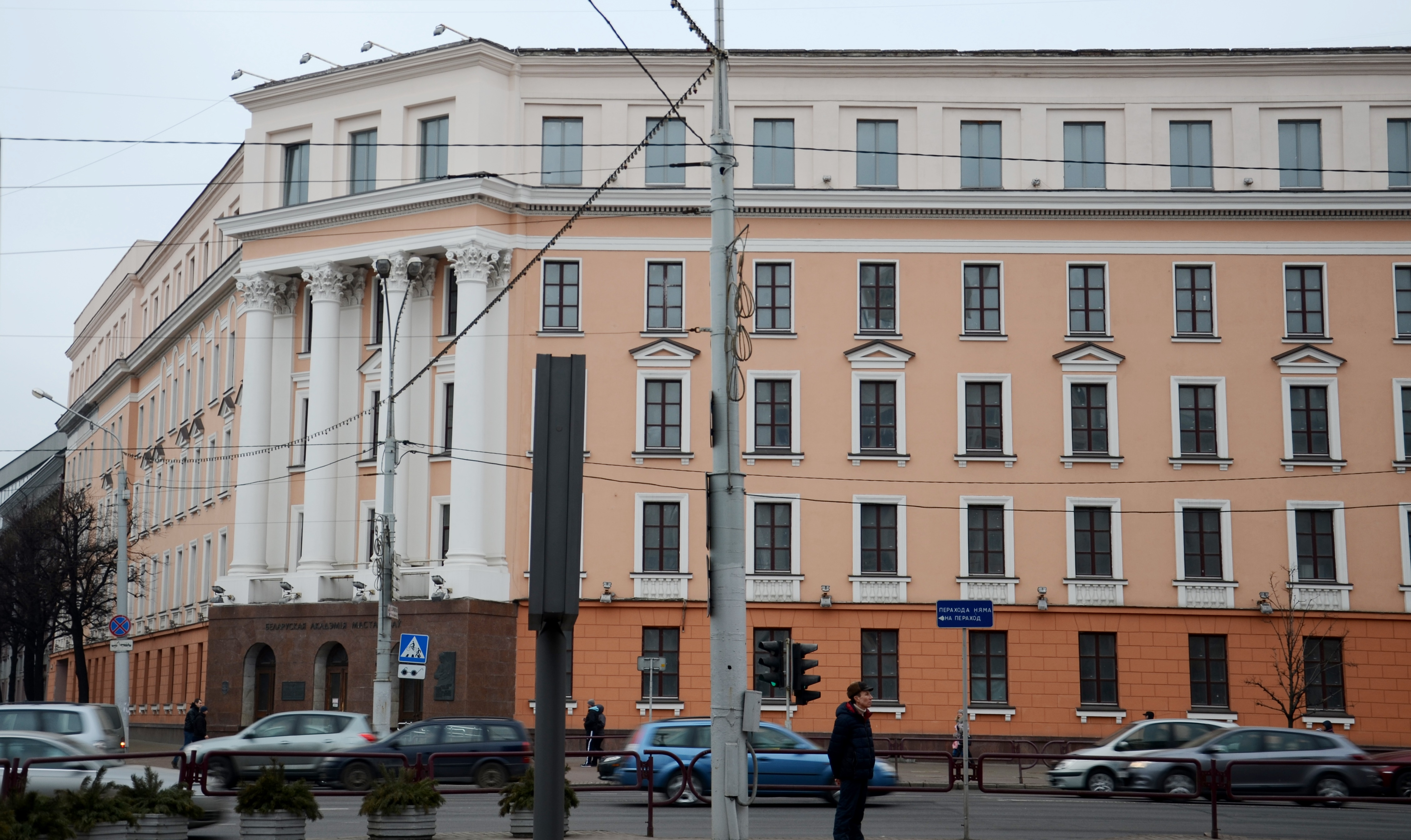
- Established: 1945
- Location: Nezavisimosti Ave, Minsk 220012, Republic of Belarus
- Public transit access: Subway: Akademiya Nauk
- Website: http://www.bdam.by

The Belarusian State Academy of Arts (Belarusian: Беларуская дзяржаўная акадэмія мастацтваў; Russian: Белорусская государственная академия искусств) is a state-owned institution of higher education in Minsk, Belarus. The Belarusian State Academy of Arts has status as a leading institution of the national system of art and cultural education alongside the Belarusian State Academy of Music and the Belarusian State University of Culture and Arts.

It was established in 1945 as the Belarus Theatrical institute. Art faculty was established in 1953, and renamed into the "Belarusian State Academy of Arts" in 2001.

== Rectors ==
- Vasyl Sharangovich (1989—1997)
- Richard Smolsky (1997—2010)
- Mikhail Borozna (2010—present)

== Faculty and Curriculum ==
- Theatrical
- Design
- Easel painting
- Monumental and Decorative painting
- Graphics and printmaking
- Sculpture
- Cinema and TV direction

== Notable alumni ==
- Palina, Belarusian singer.
- Zianon Pazniak, Belarusan nationalist politician, art critic, historian.
- Boris Zaborov, Contemporary painter, living in France.
- Alexandr Rodin, Contemporary painter, living in Germany.
- Viktar Kopach, Contemporary sculptor, living in Belarus.
- Viktar Dashkevich, Actor.
- Olga Fadeeva, actress

== Notable faculty and staff ==
- Mai Dantsig, National artist of USSR / Dean, Art faculty
- Ninel Aladova, architect, professor, head of the department "Interior and Equipment"

== Political repressions, sanctions ==
On 21 June 2021, Mikhail Borozna (Barazna), Rector of the Belarusian State Academy of Arts, was added to the sanctions list of the European Union. According to the official decision of the EU, "in his position as the Rector of the Belarusian State Academy of Arts (BSAA), Mikhail Barazna is responsible for the decision of University administration to expel students for taking part in peaceful protests. The expulsion orders were taken following Lukashenka's call on 27 October 2020 for expelling from universities students taking part in protests and strikes. Mikhail Barazna is therefore responsible for the repression of civil society and is supporting the Lukashenka regime."
