= Lukoml =

Village in Vitebsk Region, Belarus

Coordinates: 54°43′N 29°09′E

Lukoml (Belarusian: Лукомль, Polish: Łukoml) is an agrotown in Chashniki District, Vitebsk Region, Belarus. It is situated by Lake Lukoml and serves as the administrative center of Lukoml selsoviet.

== History ==
Early references to Lukoml in Russian chronicles are dated by 1078, when it was burned by Vladimir Monomakh. In 15-16th centuries it constituted a separate principality. In 1563, it was burned down by Russians. In the pre-1917 Russian Empire, it was a shtetl of about 1,000 inhabitants with one Orthodox church, one Catholic church, two synagogues, one school and 8 shops. There are remnants of ancient fortifications by the village.

== Sources ==
- "Лукомль" . Brockhaus and Efron Encyclopedic Dictionary (in Russian). 1906.
