= Ekaterina Posetselskaya =

Russian artist (born 1965)

- Екатерина Георгиевна Посецельская
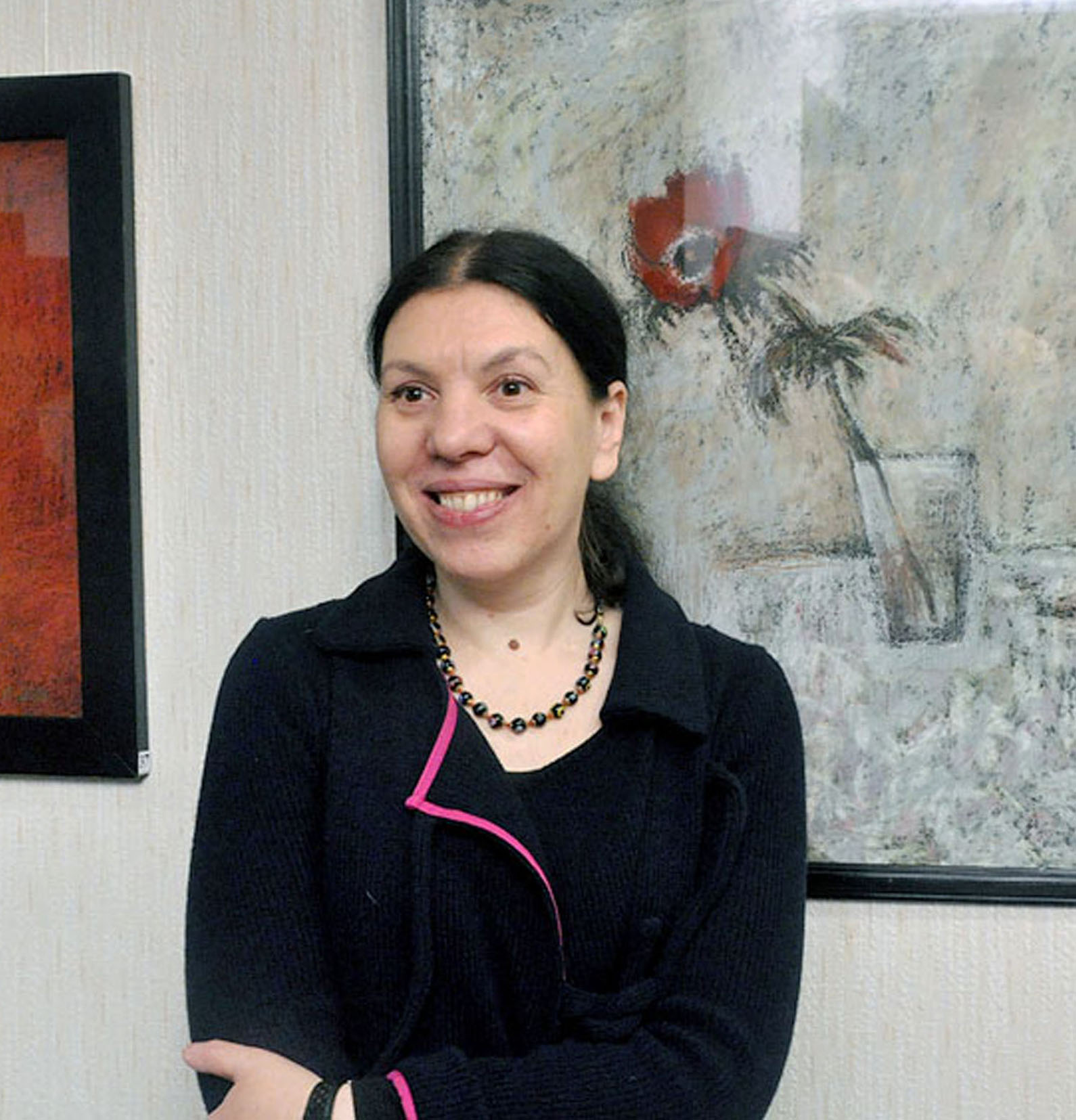
- Ekaterina Posetselskaya at the exhibition, 2016
- Born: August 7, 1965 (age 61); Leningrad, USSR
- Education: Saint Petersburg Stieglitz State Academy of Art and Design
- Known for: urban landscape pastel drawings, book illustration
- Relatives: Marc Chagall (great-uncle)

Ekaterina Posetselskaya (born August 7, 1965, in Leningrad) is a Russian-French artist.

== Biography ==
Ekaterina Posetselskaya, a grand-niece of a renowned Russian-French artist, Marc Chagall, was born in Leningrad in 1965. She graduated with honors from the textile art department of the Saint Petersburg Stieglitz State Academy of Art and Design. However, she first became prominent in France in 1992 after presenting painted easter eggs at the international Salon, followed by other European exhibitions. In 1999, she had her first solo exhibition in the trade mission of Russia in France.

In 2012, she was invited as an honorable guest to participate in Salon des Indépendants with decorated easter eggs. In 2013, she participated in Salon du dessin et de la peinture à l'eau (Paris) where her drawing of her hometown of Saint Petersburg was awarded a separate Maxime Juan Prize from the Foundation Taylor. Since 1992, she had over 250 exhibitions in her hometown of Saint Petersburg and Europe, including Salon du Dessin et de la Peinture a l’eau, Salon d’Automne, Salon des artistes français (Paris, France),Salon des Indépendants, Salon Artcité (Fontenay-sous-Bois, France), and Art-Fair in Battersea (London). Her solo exhibitions occurred in London, Paris, Meung-sur-Loire, Orleans, Reims, Zurich, Moscow, and Saint Petersburg galleries.

Posetselskaya is a member of the International Federation of Artists (since 2011), the Artists' Union of Russia (since 1991), the National Pastel Society of Russia, Art de Pastel en France, and the Foundation Taylor (France).

== Style ==
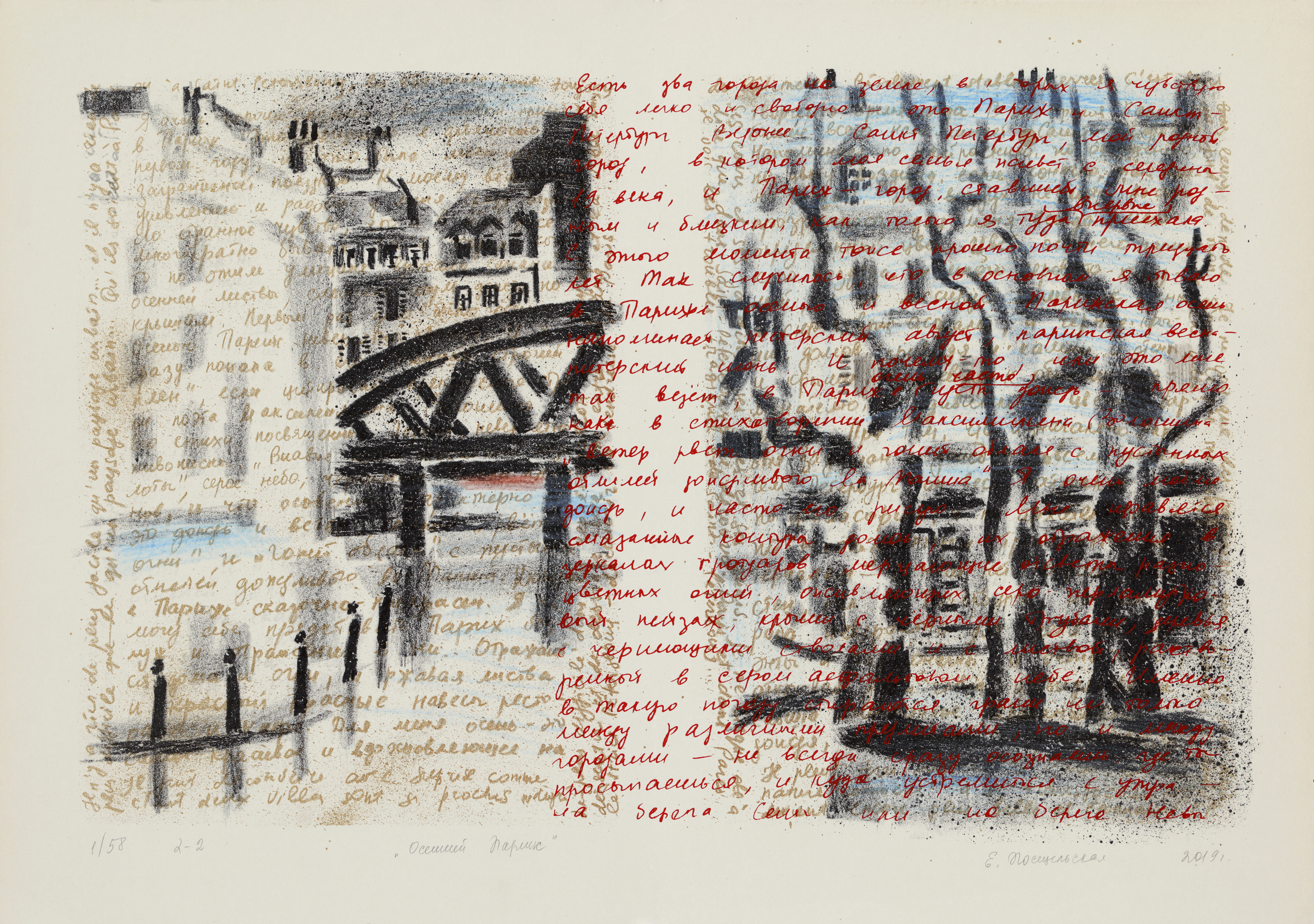
Autumn Paris/ for the project City as an Artist's Subjectivity. 2019–2020. Paper, lithography, silk-screen printing, colour pencils

Over the years, Posetselskaya worked in painting, batik, printed graphics, book design, and tapestry. However, she's best known for her pastel drawings of cities such as Saint Petersburg, London, and Paris. Her works present the city as a protagonist, free of genre scenes. Posetselskaya focuses on the architecture and geometry of flat surfaces, using pastels to mimic the texture of the walls and add softness to the image. She leans towards delicate ochre, beige, brown, light-gray, cadmium, and coppery colors.

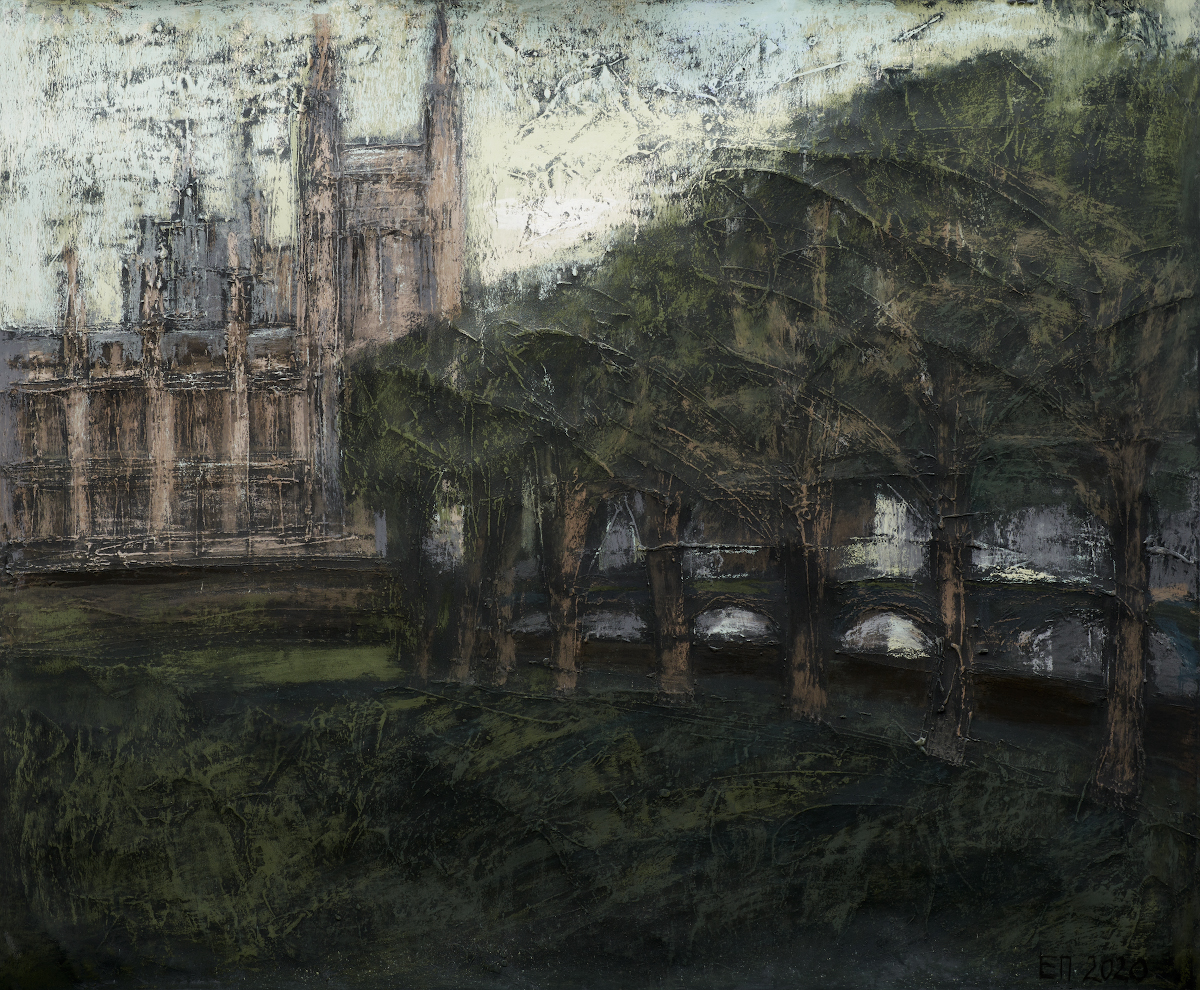
Sunset view from Vasilyevky island. 2019. Paper, acrylic paint, pastel

Posetselskaya is a renowned illustrator who has worked on more than 30 books. Her notable works include forty pastels for the new edition of the Goat Song by Konstantin Vaginov; fifty illustrations for the Stone. Tristia edition of Osip Mandelstam poems; Marina Tsvetaeva's The Tale of Sonechka; and illustrations for the Book of Daniel published by Vita Nova Publishing.

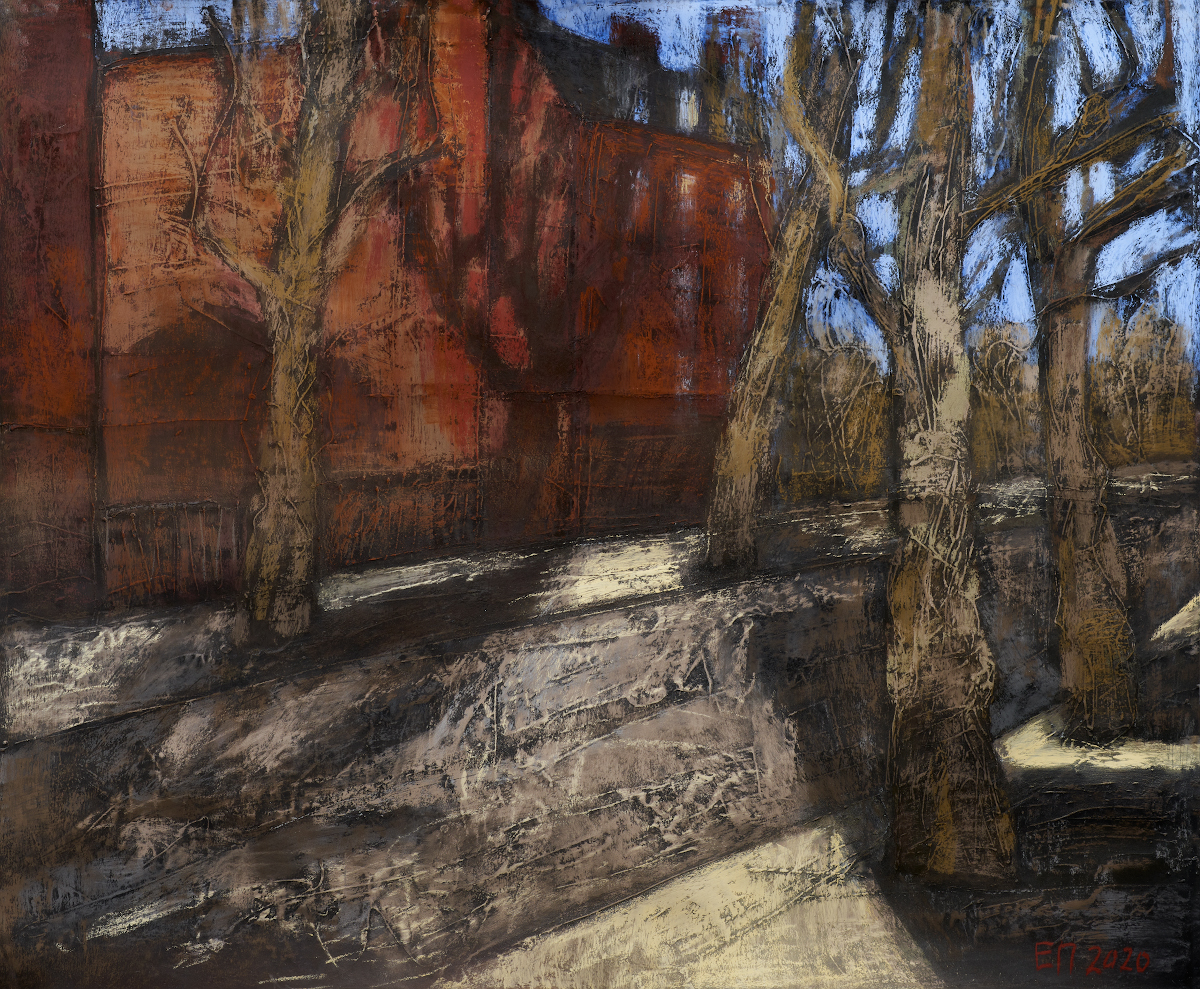
Sunny day in London. 2020. Paper, acrylic paint, pastel

Posetselskaya's method resembles impressionist art and the works of her favorite artists: Albert Marquet, Maurice Utrillo, and Giotto. Her friends, such as Belarusian-French artist Boris Zaborov, also influenced her style.

== Awards ==
Posetselskaya received three gold, four silver, and a bronze medal from the International Federation of Artists. She received the gold award at an international salon in Saint-Raphaël (2003), Vladimir Vetrogonski award of the International Triennale of Graphic Art in Saint Petersburg. Her book illustrations won her an Image of the Book award (2023), as well as numerous awards and medals from the Moscow International Book Fair and the Saint Petersburg branch of the International Federation of Artists (IFA).

== Works ==
Ekaterina Posetselskaya's solo shows took place in galleries and museums in Paris, Reims, Orleans, Meung-sur-Loire (France), London (UK), Zurich (Switzerland), Moscow, and Saint Petersburg (Russia).

Her works are included in the collections of the State Hermitage museum, the Russian Museum, Erarta, and other museums, as well as private collections in Russia, France, Belgium, Germany, Netherlands, Czech, and the USA.

== Gallery ==
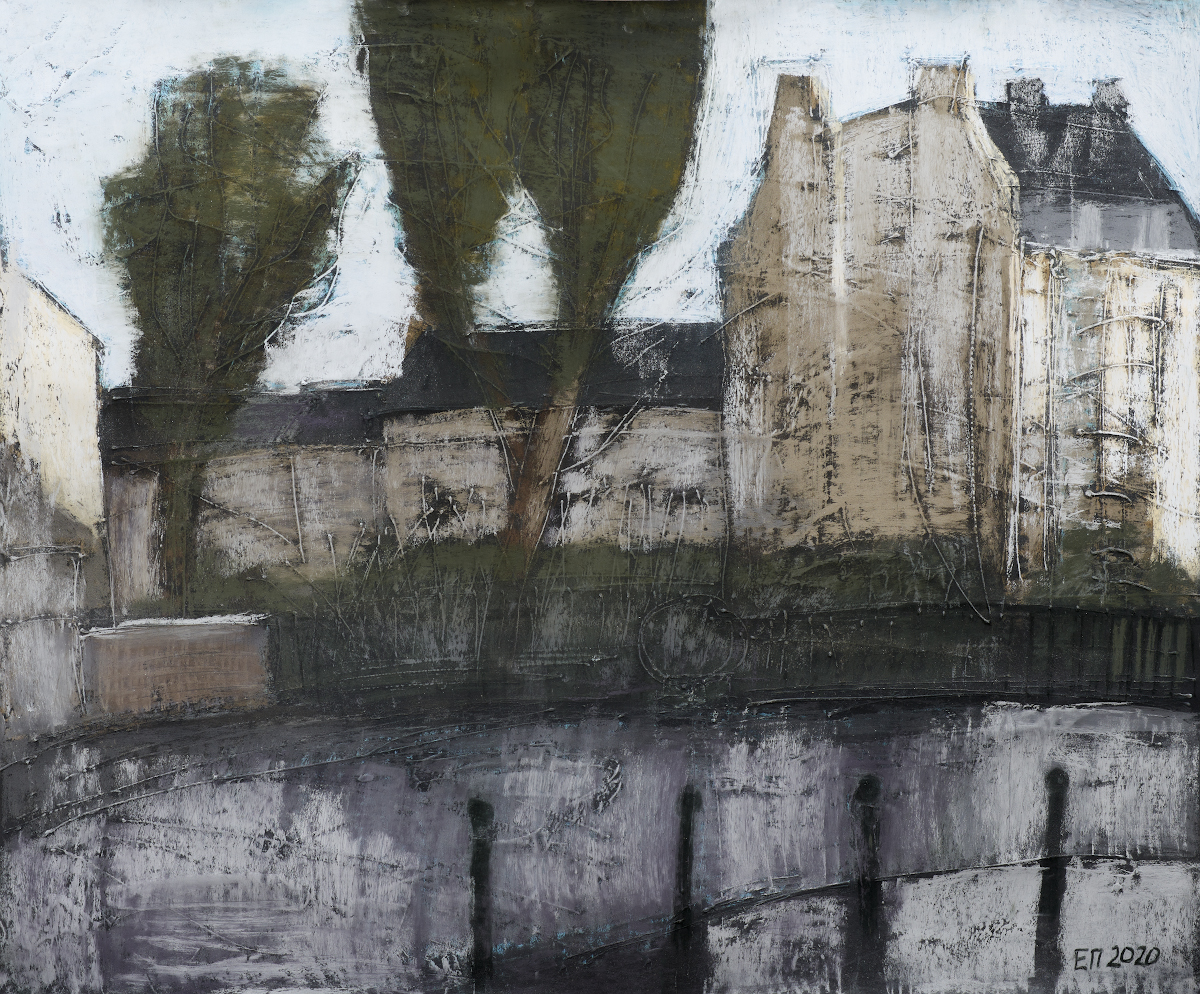
Paris after rain. 2020. Paper, acrylic paint, pastel

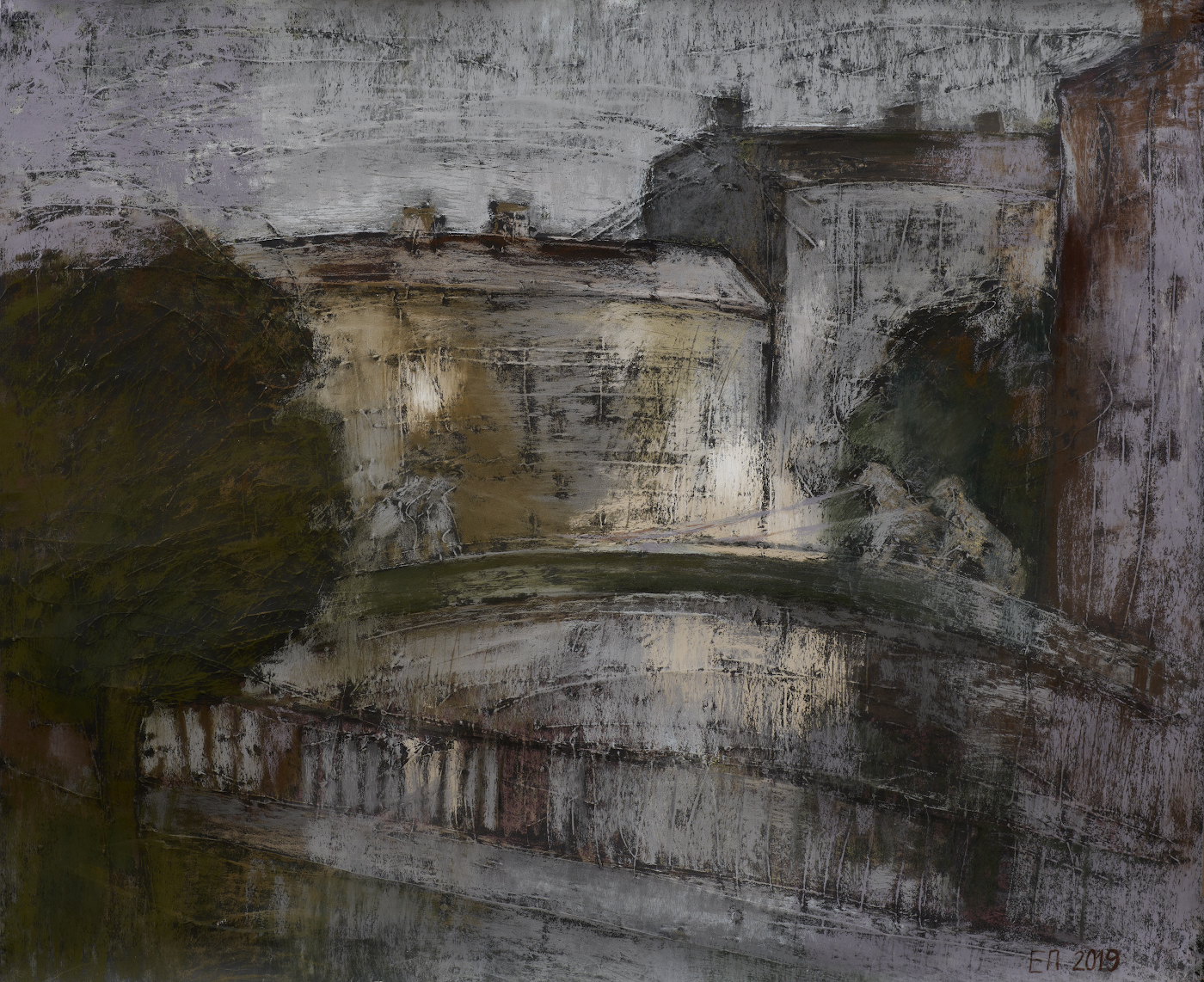
Griboedov channel at night. 2019. Paper, acrylic paint, pastel

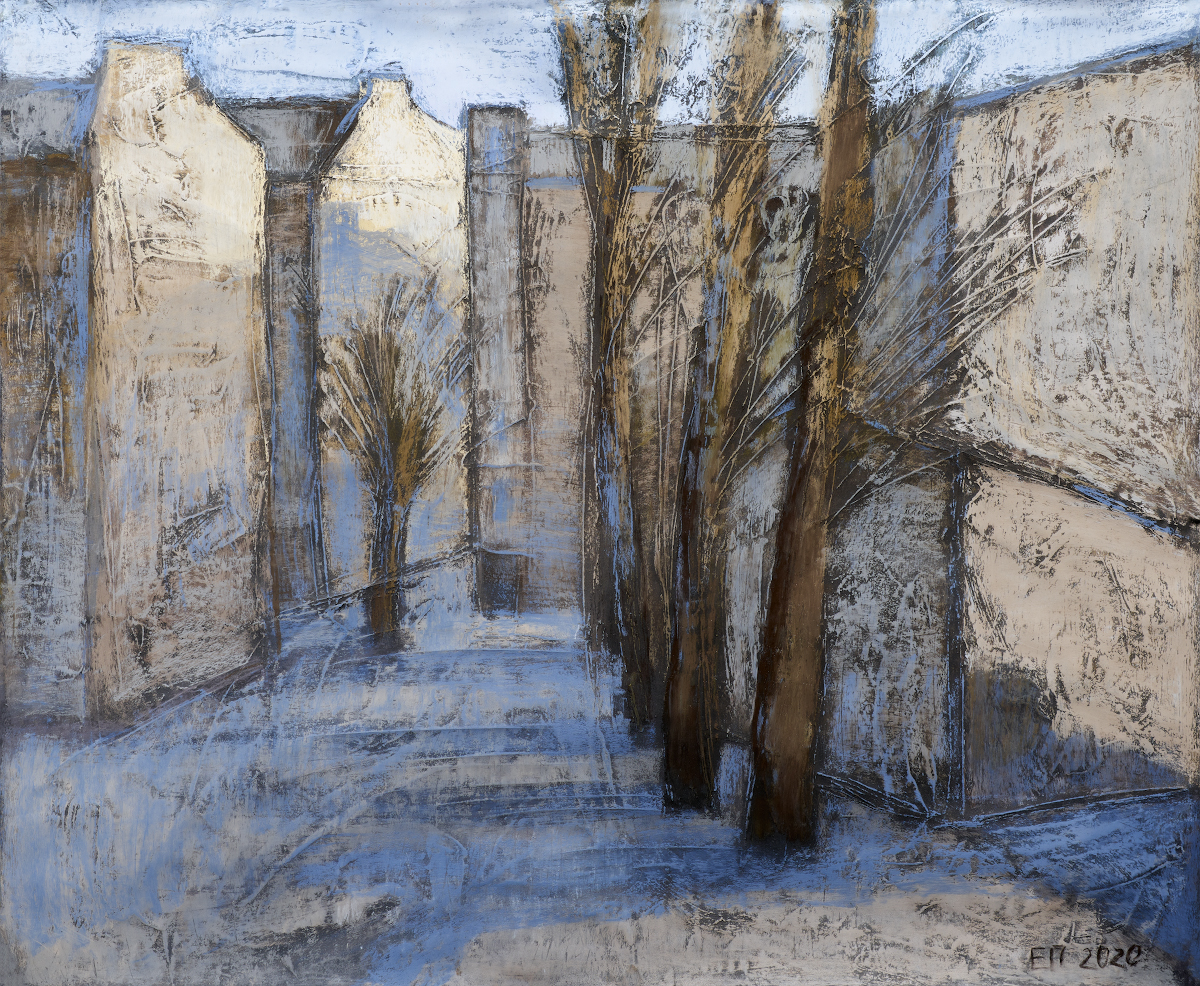
April sun. 2020. Paper, acrylic paint, pastels

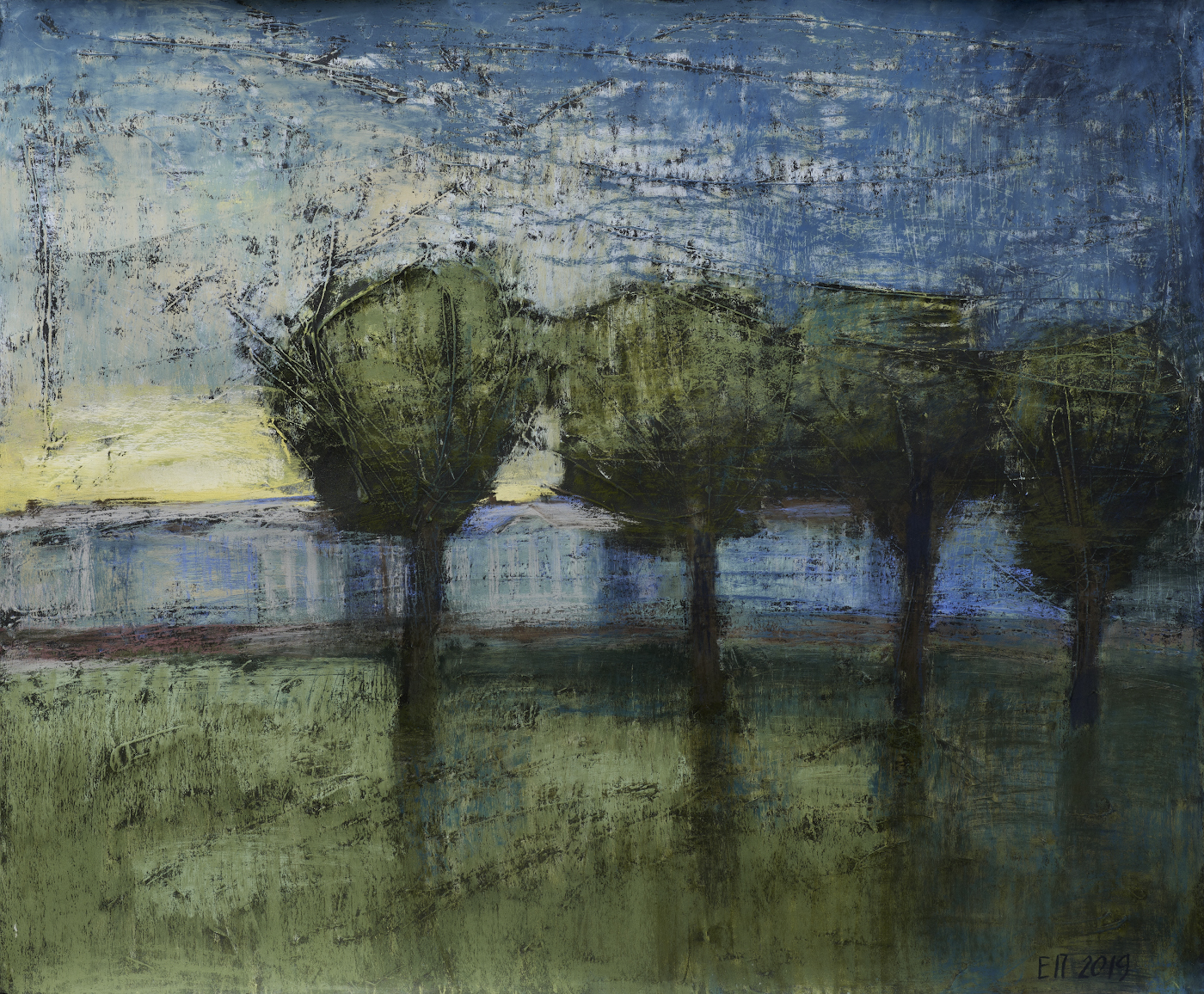
Sunset view from the spit of Vasilyevsky island. 2019. Paper, acrylic paint, pastel

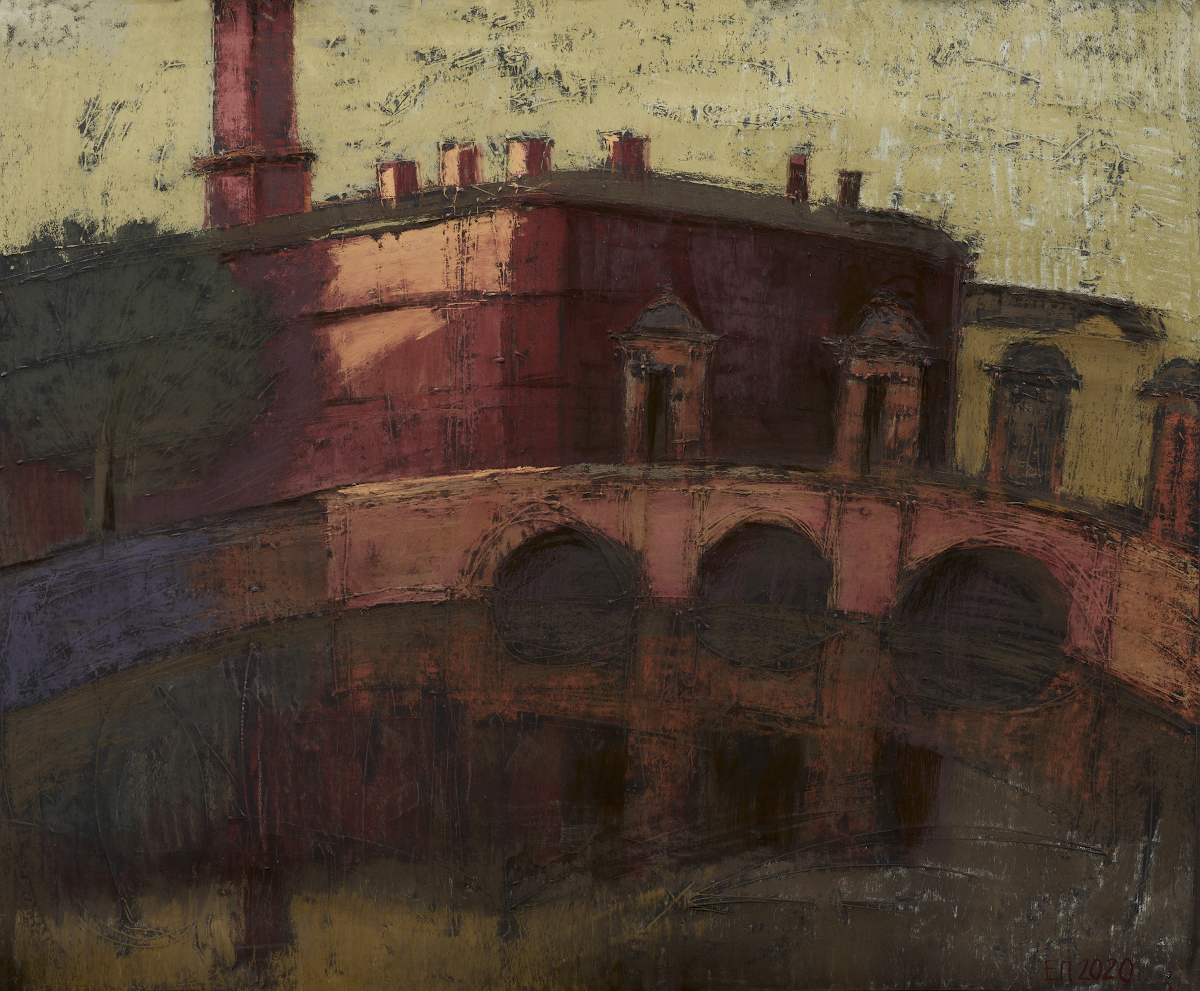
Dusk. Westminster. 2020. Paper, acrylic paint, pastels
