= Irina Kotova =

Belarusian-French painter and graphic artist

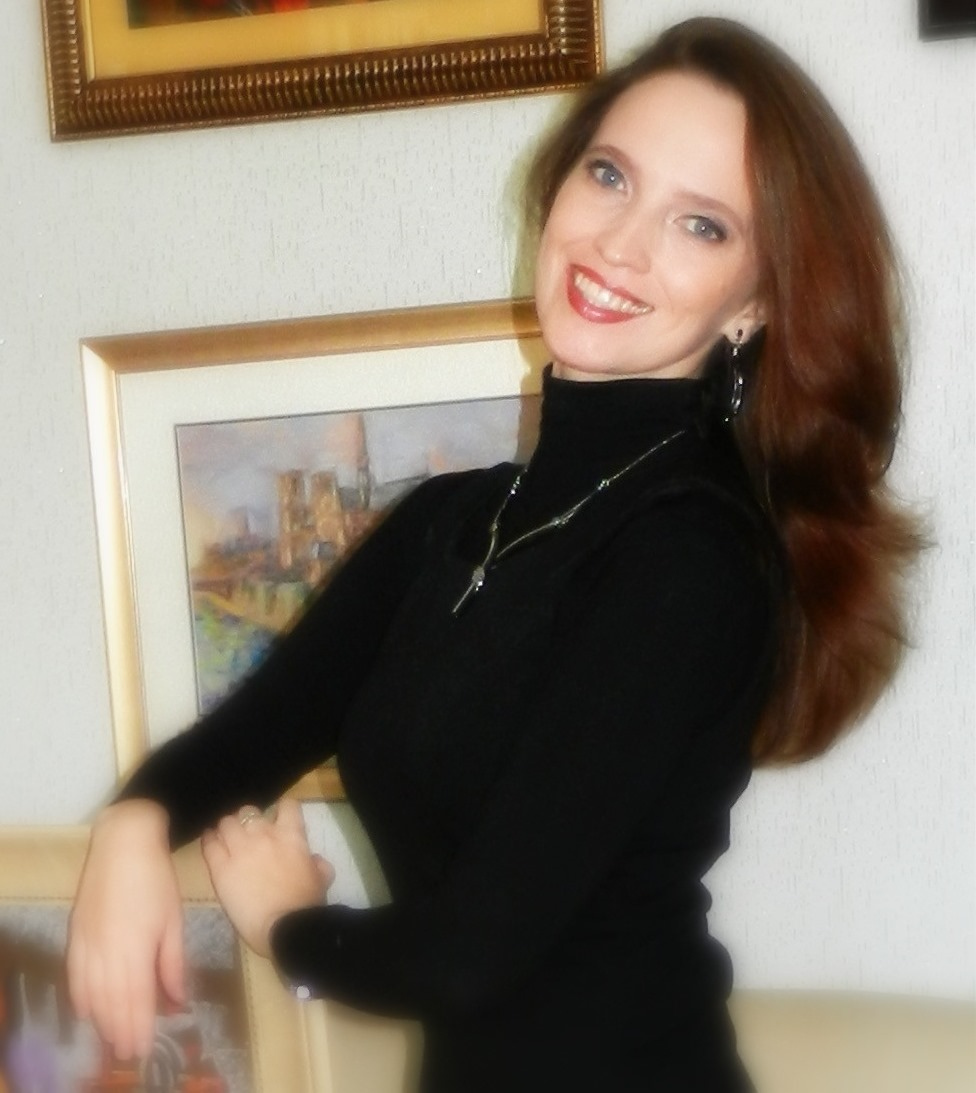
- Born: 17 November 1976; Minsk, Belarus
- Education: Belarusian State Academy of Arts
- Known for: Drawing, Painting

Irina Kotova (Belarusian: Ірына Міхайлаўна Котава, Russian: Ирина Михайловна Котова; born November 17, 1976, in Minsk) is a Belarusian-French painter and graphical artist.

== Biography ==
Irina Kotova was born in Minsk (Belarus), November 17, 1976. She studied in Belarusian State Academy of Arts from 1996 to 2002, got a Diploma of Graphic Art Department. She entered St. Sergius Orthodox Theological Institute in Paris in 2003, got a Diploma of Theology Licence in 2007. She studied in the École pratique des hautes études (EPHE) in Paris from 2007 to 2009, got a Diploma in the History of Art, Master. Kotova is a participant in international and republican exhibitions. Her works are kept in the National Art Museum of the Republic of Belarus, the Belarusian Embassy in Paris, and various private collections across Belarus, Russia, France, Italy, Spain, Canada, and the USA.

== Exhibitions ==
=== Personal exhibitions ===
- 2005 with the support of the Orthodox Church in America (OCA), Charleston (South Carolina), U.S.A.
- 2006 Belarusian Embassy in France, Paris
- 2010-2011 National Art Museum of the Republic of Belarus, Minsk
- 2011 Belarusian State Academy of Arts, Minsk
- 2012 Russian Centre of Science and Culture in Paris
- 2013-2014: Orthodoxie.com gallery in Paris, "From the Incarnation to the Resurrection".
- 2018 Belarusian Embassy in France, Paris
- 2018 Honorary Consulate of the Republic of Belarus in France, Biarritz

=== Duo exhibition ===
- 2013-2014: Russkiy Mir gallery in Paris, "The Wings of Christmas".

=== Group exhibitions ===
- 1995/1996 two International Exhibitions, organized by the Canadian Relief Fund for Chernobyl Victims in Belarus (CRFCVB), la Maison du Citoyen, Hull, Canada
- 2003 International Exhibition «Alberobello Arte editione 2003», Alberobello, Italy
- 2003 3rd International Exhibition of Arts, Sartrouville, France
- 2004 4th International Exhibition of Arts, Sartrouville, France
- 2006 5th International Exhibition of Arts, Sartrouville, France
- 2006 Belarusian Embassy in Paris, France
- 2009 International Exhibition at the art gallery of the Palace of Republic in Minsk, Belarus
- 2011 Exhibition “Le retour au romantisme” (“Return to Romanticism”) at The National Library of Belarus, Minsk,
- 2013 International Exhibition “Welcome to Central and Eastern Europe. Beyond the cliché” at D.E.V.E. Gallery in Bruges, Belgium
- 2018 Exhibition of professors of art workshops in the city of Croissy-sur-Seine, France
- 2018 Exhibition of artists from the Belarusian diaspora at the Belarusian embassy in France, Paris.
- 2019 Exhibition of professors of art workshops in the city of Croissy-sur-Seine, France

=== Open Days Artists Workshops ===
- 2016 Open Days Artists Workshops, Croissy-sur-Seine, France
- 2017 Open Days Artists Workshops, Croissy-sur-Seine, France
- 2018 Open Days Artists Workshops, Croissy-sur-Seine, France
- 2019 Open Days Artists Workshops, Croissy-sur-Seine, France

== Book illustrations ==
Irina Kotova illustrated a new English version of the book The Conversation of St Seraphim of Sarov with N.A. Motovilov, published in London in 2010.

== Presentations, reportings, documentary ==
- In 2009, Irina Kotova’s creative work was presented by a French writer and publicist Christophe Levalois in his report at National Art History Institute in Paris.
- In 2010 « TV-First » Channel of Belteleradiocompany prepared a special newscast reporting from the opening of Irina Kotova’s exhibition at National Art Museum of the Republic of Belarus.
- In 2010, Belteleradiocompany released a documentary Imaginary Paris (director Sergej Katier). The film was awarded the prize of the Mayor of Obninsk at the 7th International Sretenskij Orthodox Film Festival, which was held from 17 to 22 February 2012 in four towns of Kaluga region (Russia).

== Edition ==
- In 2010, Irina Kotova’s painting album Imaginary Paris (French: Paris imaginaire, Belarusian: Уяўны Парыж, Russian: Воображаемый Париж) translated in three languages (French, Belarusian and Russian) was prepared and published in common with a French writer Christophe Levalois and with the assistance of Ministry of Cultural Affairs of Belarus, Belarusian Embassy in Paris, France, Embassy of France in Belarus and the Belarusian Union of Artists. Minsk, 2010 (ISBN 978-985-6893-39-4).
