= Abram Zaborov =

Soviet Belarusian-Israeli painter

Abram Zaborov (Belarusian Абрам Забораў; 18 February 1911, Liozna, Vitebsk Region — 1985, Israel) was a Soviet Belarusian and Israeli painter of Jewish descent, a member of the Union of Painters of the USSR, and the father of famous French painter Boris Zaborov.

== Biography ==
The mother of Abram, Sifra Naumovna, owned a store, where the father of the future painter, Boris A. Zaborov, was working. Abram's maternal grandfather worked as a bailiff at the estate of a gentleman from Liozna. The circumstances forced the family to leave Liozna and return to Abram's father's native town of Velizh. There Abram Zaborov entered a 7-year Jewish school, where he first demonstrated his artistic talent.

This was the period of the Russian Civil War. Soviet propaganda needed the artists to create propaganda posters and slogans. Abram Zaborov was quite successful in drawing posters. His drawing teacher was Marfa Nikolaevna Volkova, the mother of the future famous Belarusian painter Anatoly Volkov. After graduating from high school, Abram Zaborov entered Vitebsk Painting School, which he finished in 1930. After that Abram Zaborov moved to Minsk, where he spent most of his artistic career. In 1935 he became the father of the future famous artist Boris Zaborov.

Among Zaborov's pre-WWII paintings are "New people, new city" and "Chapaev". The latter was demonstrated at the Young Painters of the Soviet Union Exhibition dedicated to 20 years of Komsomol and took place in 1939. This painting made him famous in the Soviet Union. In 1940 at the Exhibition "10 days of Belarusian Art", Abram Zaborov presented the painting "Where is my Son?". The reproduction of the painting was later published in the Tvorchestvo magazine.

Abram Zaborov fought as a soldier during World War II. After the war was over, he returned to Minsk. He became the member of the Union of Painters of the Soviet Union. Some of his paintings are exhibited at The National Art Museum of the Republic of Belarus.

In 1979 Abram Zaborov repatriated to Israel. One of his paintings is exhibited at the Knesset.
