= Lukoml Power Station =

Thermal power station in Novolukhoml, Belarus

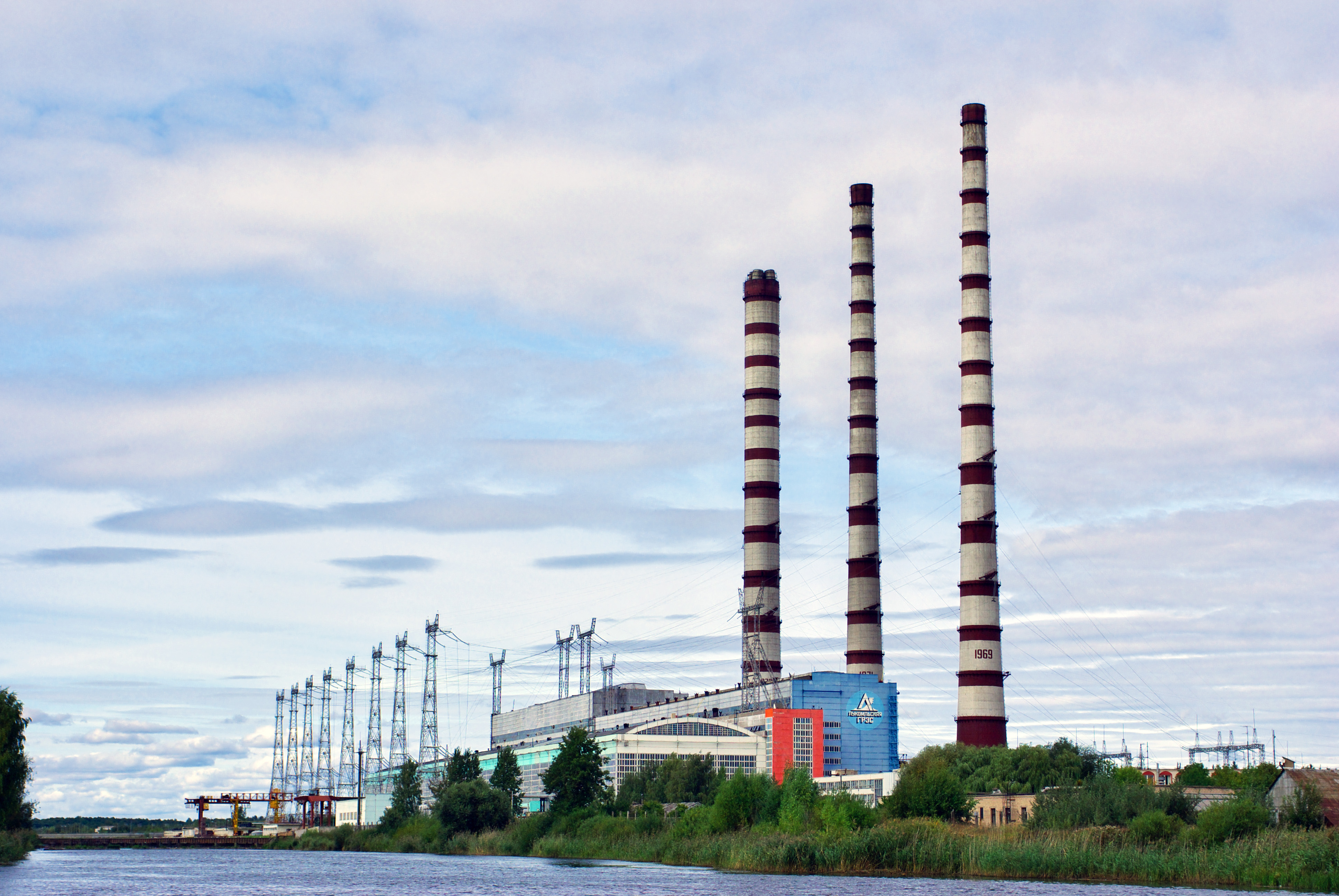
- Country: Belarus
- Location: Novolukoml, Vitsebsk Voblast
- Coordinates: 54°40′51.34″N 29°8′5.27″E
- Status: Operational
- Construction began: 1964
- Commission date: 1969
- Owner: Belenergo

Thermal power station
- Primary fuel: Natural gas
- Secondary fuel: Fuel oil

Power generation
- Units operational: 8 x 330 MW
- Make and model: TAGMET; LMZ; Electrosila
- Nameplate capacity: 2,640 MW

External links
- Commons: Related media on Commons

The Lukoml Power Station (Lukoml GRES, Lukomlskaya GRES, Lukomlskaya DRES, Russian: Лукомльская ГРЭС) is a natural gas-fired thermal power station located in Novolukoml, Vitsebsk Voblast, Belarus. It is operated by Belenergo.

Construction of the power station started in 1964. It was built in two stages. In the first stage, four double-boiler single-turbine units, each of 300 MW capacity, were commissioned in December 1969–September 1971. In the second stage, four single-boiler single-turbine units, each of 300 MW capacity, were added in December 1972–August 1974. In the 2000s, the generation units were upgraded by 10%, increasing the installed capacity up to 2,640 MW.

The three flue gas stacks, which serve also as electricity pylons for the outgoing power lines, are 250 metres (820 ft) tall and were built in 1969–1973.

== Gallery ==
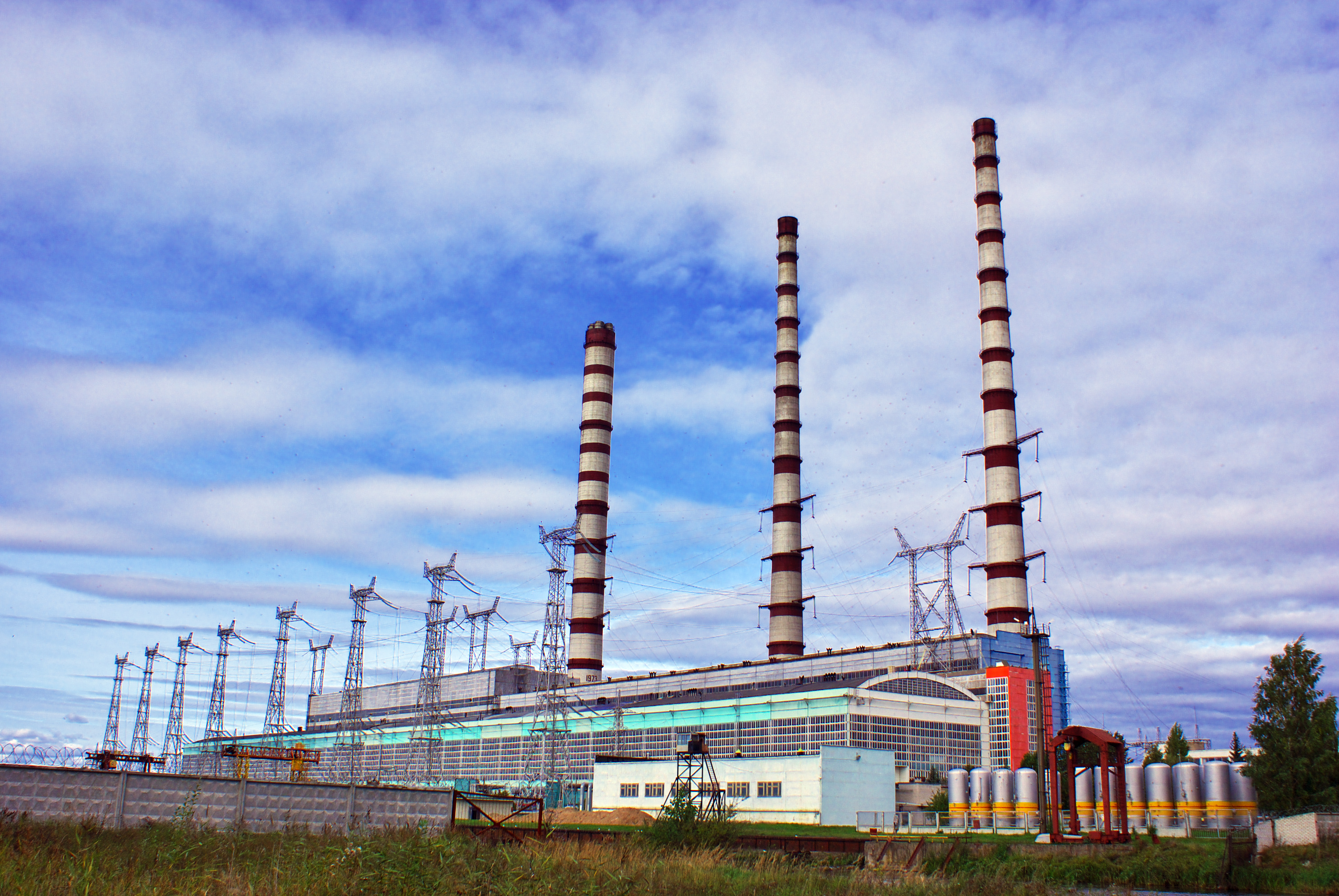

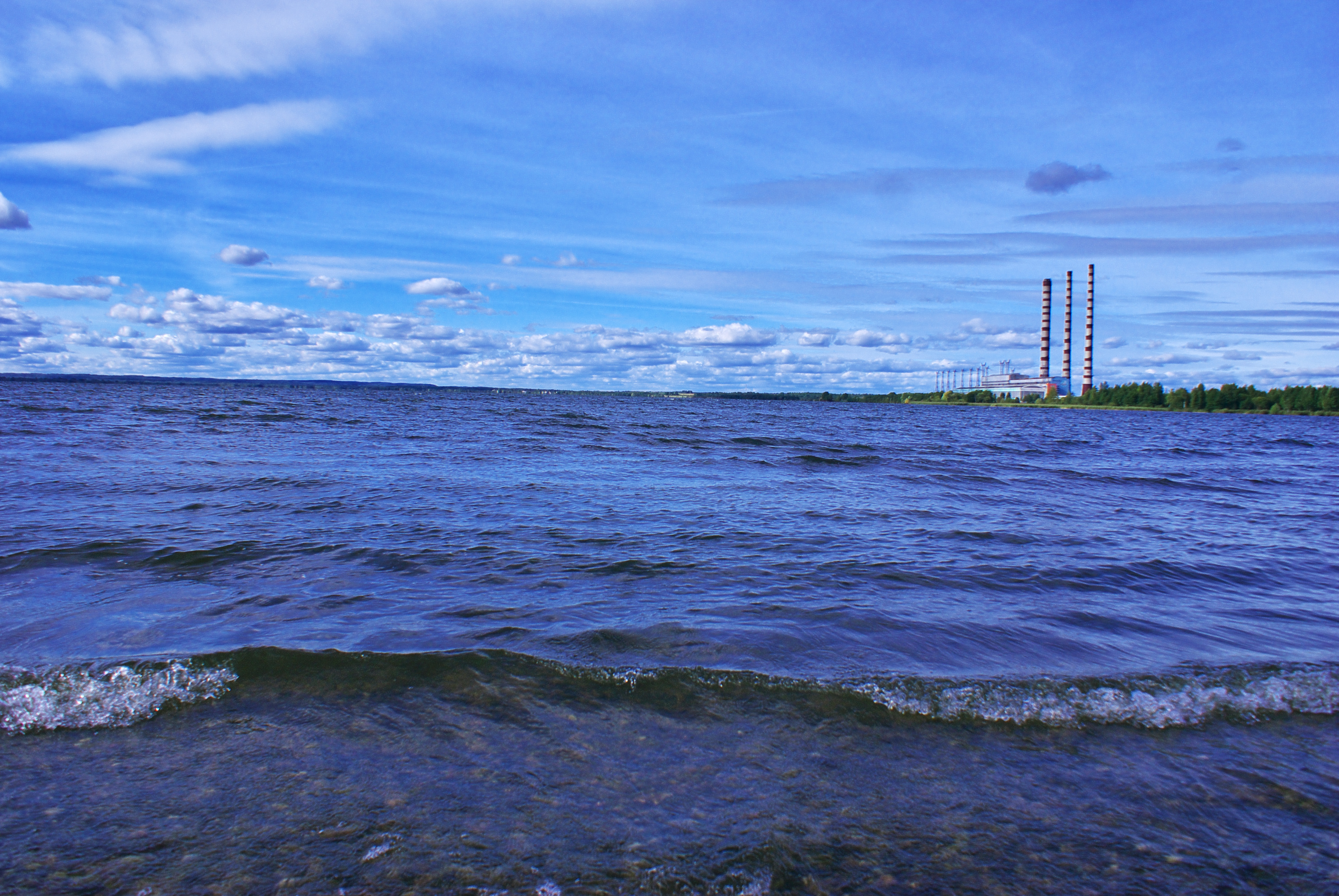

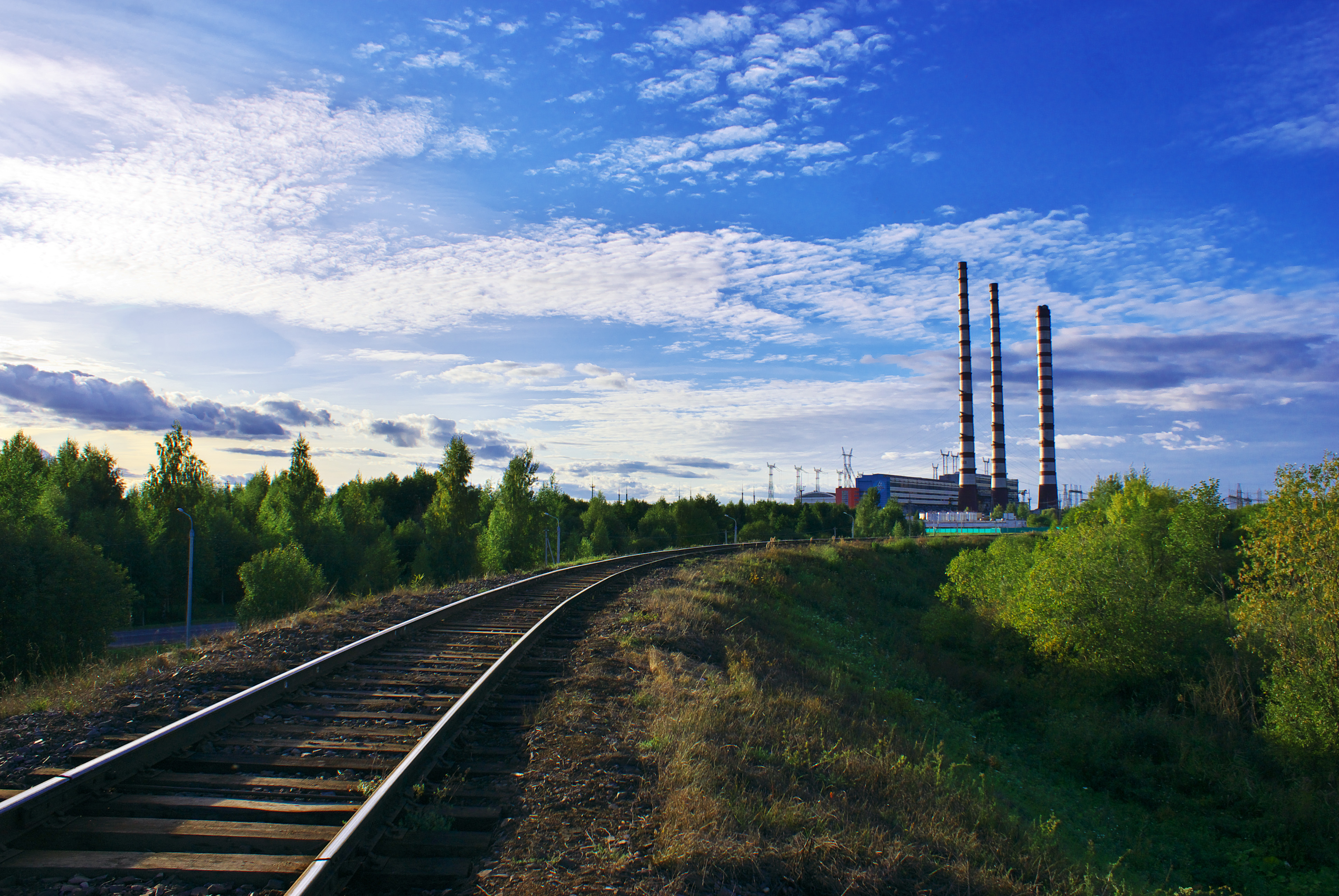

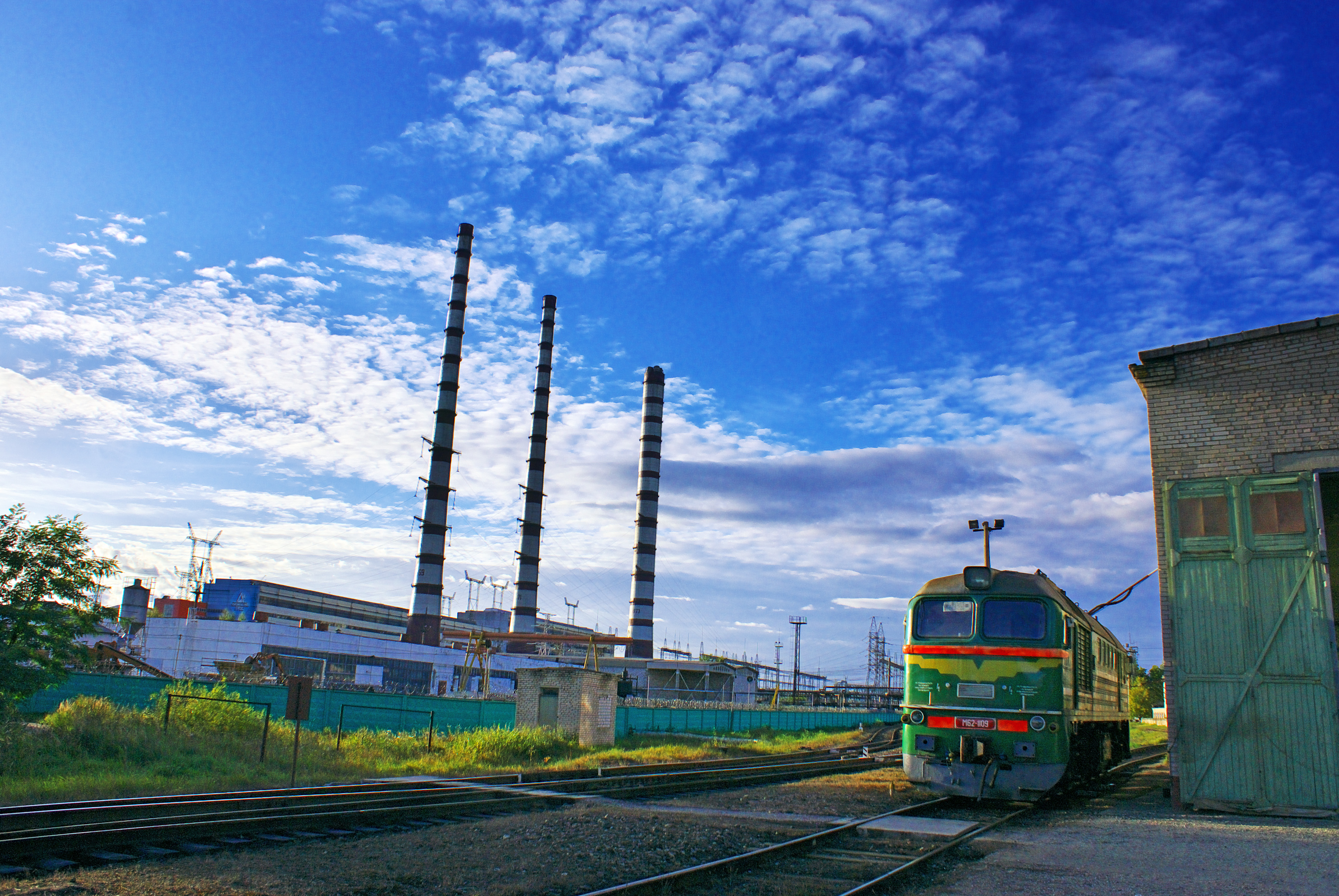

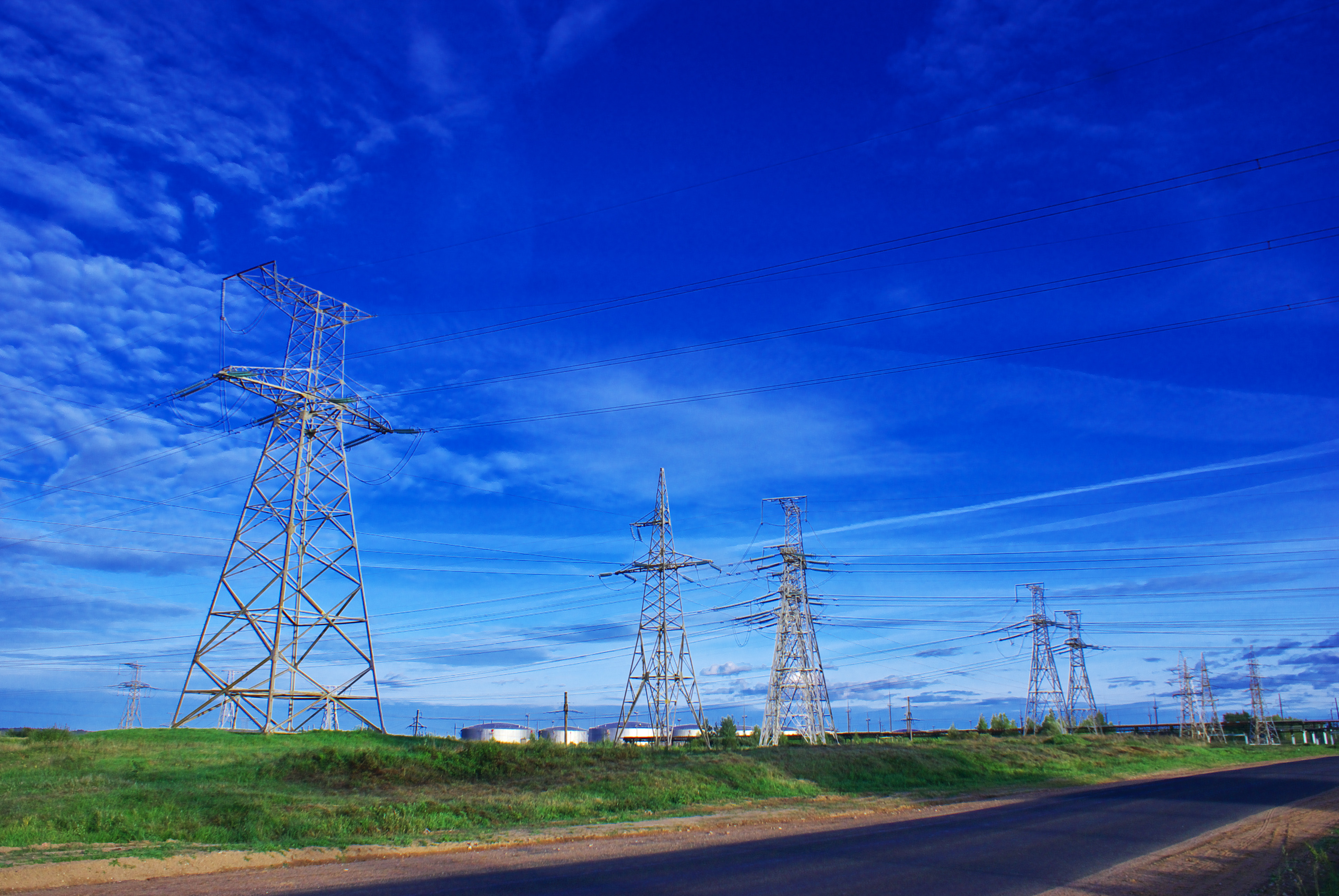

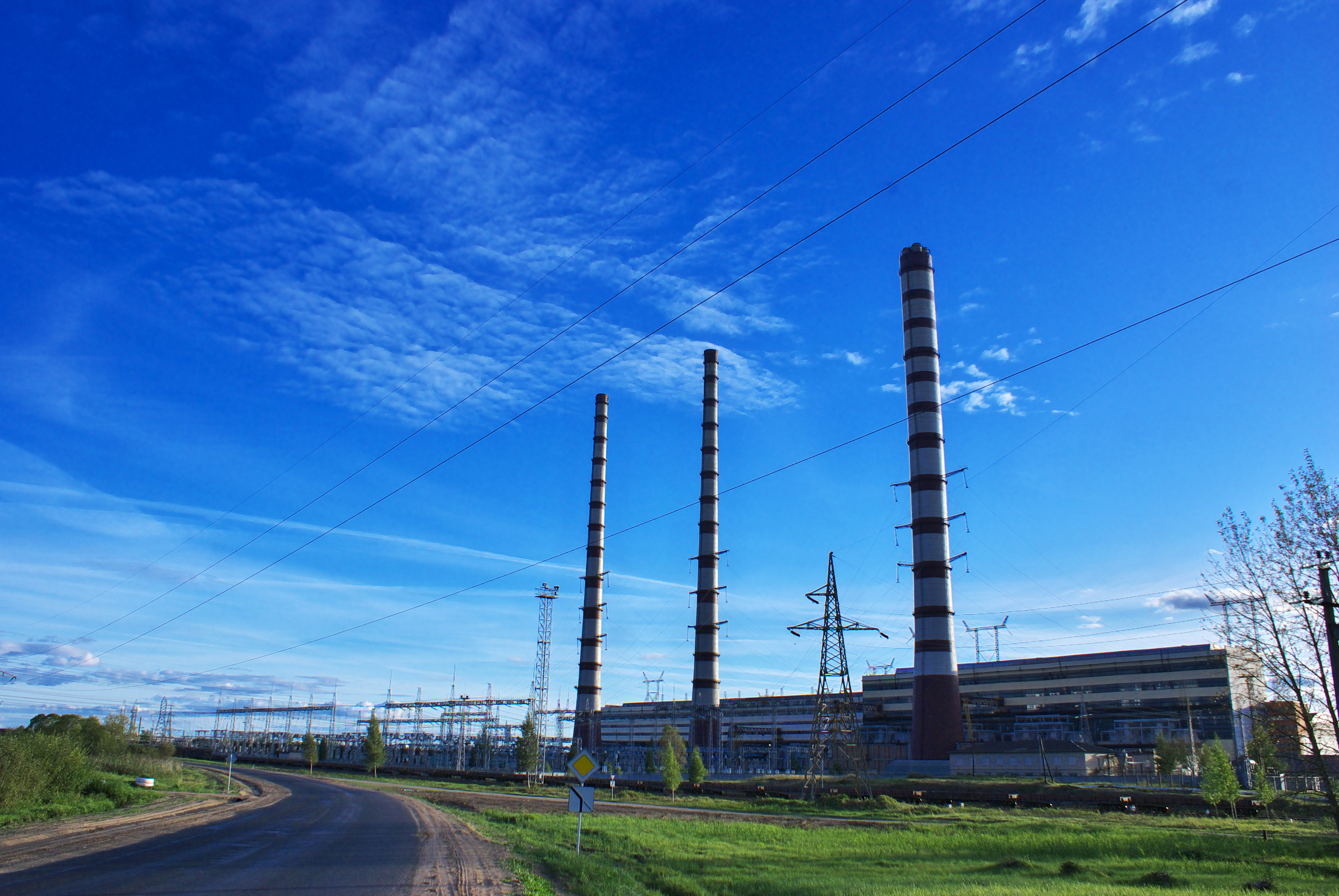
