= Alexandr Rodin =

Belarusian painter (1947–2022)

Alexander Rodin
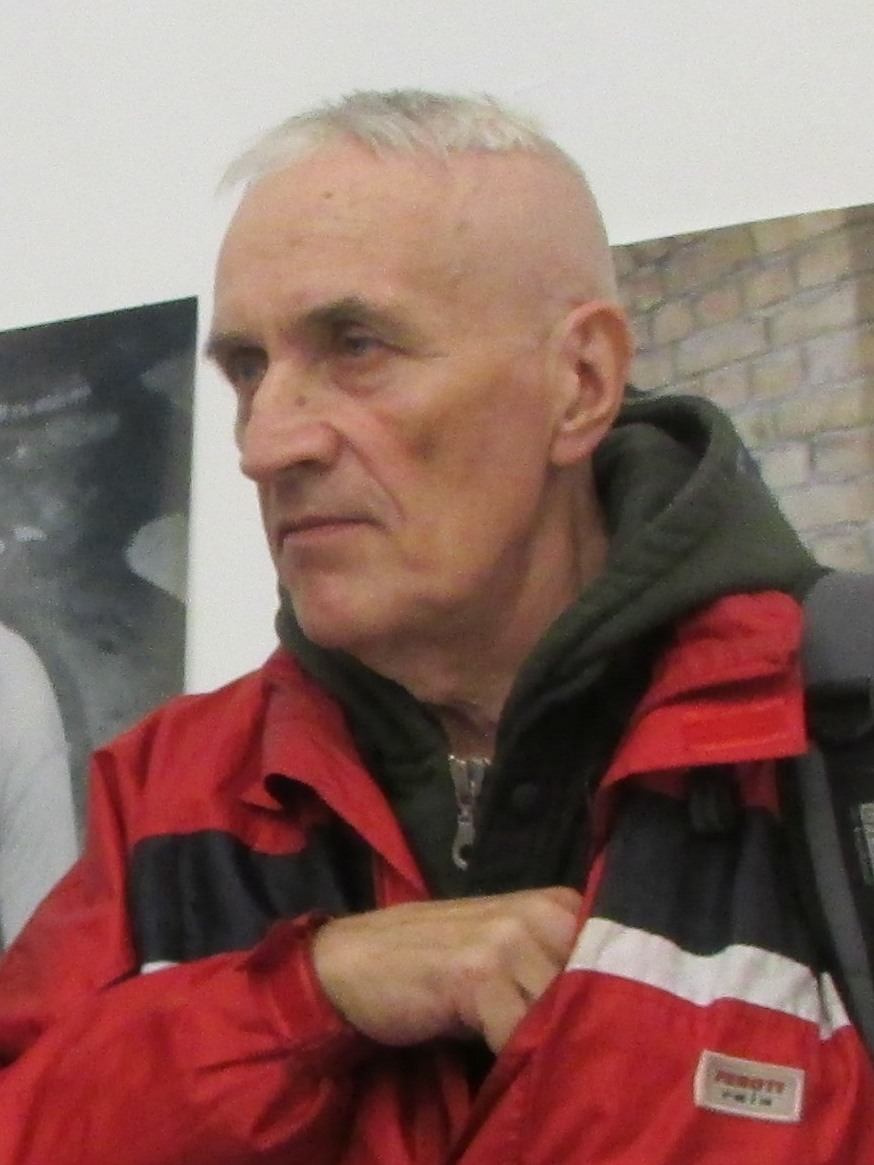
- Born: 15 May 1947; Baranovichi, Brest Oblast, Byelorussian SSR, USSR
- Died: 19 December 2022 (aged 75); Minsk, Belarus
- Occupation: Painter

Alexander Rodin, sometimes spelled as Alexandr or Alex Rodin (Belarusian: Аляксандр або Алесь Родзін; Belarusian pronunciation: Aliaksandr Rodzin; 15 May 1947 – 19 December 2022) was a Belarusian contemporary painter.

== Biography ==
Alexandr Rodin was born on 15 May 1947 in Baranovichi, a city in the Brest Region of western Belarus. He moved to Minsk in 1950. From 1960 until 1965 he studied at the 'School of Arts nr. 1' in the same city; in 1966 he started a study at the Belarusian State Academy of Arts, which he finished in 1971. His first exhibition was in 1971 at the Exhibition of Young Artists at the Belarusian National Arts Museum. Since 1971, he had held over 100 exhibitions in Belarus, Russia, the Netherlands, Belgium, France and Germany. He resided at Kunsthaus Tacheles, Berlin, Germany for 12 years, because (as he describes it himself in an interview with website n-europe.eu) 'Berlin is a place interested in art. [...] I am an artist and exhibitions are my life. And when I suggest a concept of an exhibition or an event and see that it fascinates Germans – why not to organize it there? Why not to hold an exhibition in Berlin when it acknowledges my creativity?'.

== Work ==
Art critic Larysa Mikhnevich described him as "the representative of neo-avart-garde and of the 'good old' painting: anecdotic and figurative".

Интервью, 2009 год, выставка ДАХ
