= Lake Lukomlskoye =

Lake in Vitebsk Region, Belarus

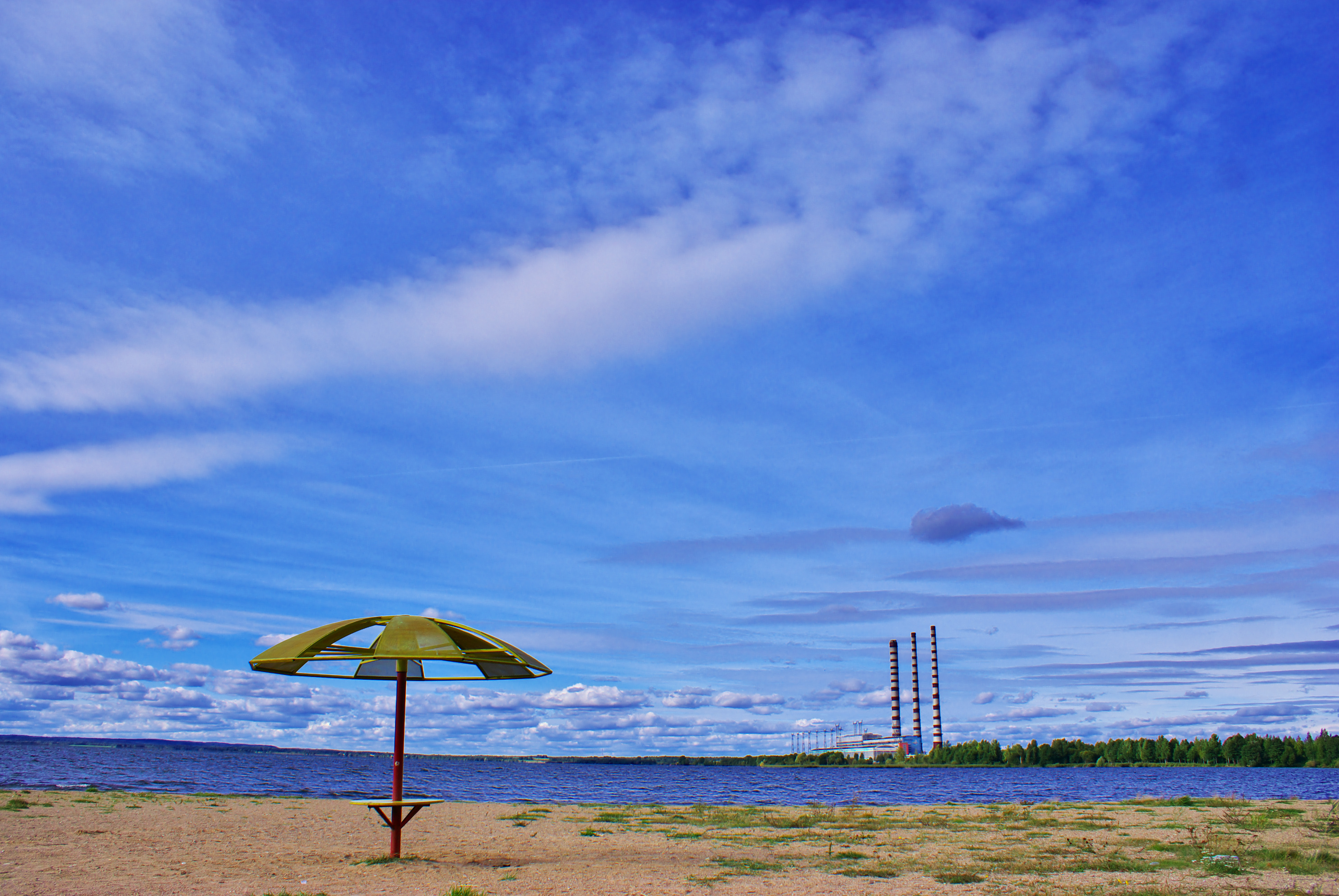

- Location within Belarus
- Location: Chashniki District, Vitebsk Region
- Coordinates: 54°40′14″N 29°5′23″E
- Lake type: freshwater
- Catchment area: 179 km^{2} (69 sq mi)
- Basin countries: Belarus
- Surface area: 37.7 km^{2} (14.6 sq mi)
- Average depth: 6.6 m (22 ft)
- Max. depth: 11.5 m (38 ft)
- Surface elevation: 165.1 m (542 ft)

Lake Lukomlskoye or Lukoml Lake (Belarusian: Лукомскае возера, Лукомальскае возера; Russian: Лукомльское озеро) is a lake in Chashniki District, Vitebsk Region, Belarus. It is the fourth largest lake in Belarus. The lake is situated by the town of Novolukoml.
