= Ninel Aladova =

Belarusian architect (1934–2021)

Ninel Ivanovna Aladova
- Born: June 12, 1934; Minsk, BSSR, USSR
- Died: September 18, 2021 (aged 87)
- Education: Belarusian National Technical University (1958)
- Occupation: Architect
- Spouse: Valmen Nikolaevich Aladov
- Awards: Diploma of the Council of Ministers of the Republic of Belarus (2004)

Ninel Ivanovna Aladova (June 12, 1934 – September 18, 2021) was a Belarusian architect, interior and furniture specialist, theorist and educator. She earned a Candidate of Sciences degree in Architecture in 1972. She received the title Honorary furniture maker of Belarus in 2008. Aladova is an active member of the Belarusian Academy of Architecture (since 2004), and an active member of the Belarusian Association of Architects and Civil Engineers (since 2000).

== Biography ==
Aladova graduated in 1958 from the Belarusian National Technical University in Minsk. From 1958 to 1959, she was an architect at the Beldiproselbud Institute. From 1959 to 1969, she worked at the Belgosproekt Institute as an architect, then senior architect, and finally head of the institute group, where she completed a number of significant projects for construction in the city of Minsk and in Minsk Oblast. Since 1969, she has been a member of the Belarusian Union of Architects. She was a postgraduate student at the Institute of Construction and Architecture of the State Construction Committee of the BSSR from 1969 to 1972.

In the 70s, she taught at the Department "Interior and Equipment" of the Belarusian State Academy of Arts in the capacities of senior lecturer and associate professor. She went on to become head of the department and full professor.

Among her students are the head of the Department "Interior and Equipment" Mikhail Shikov, associate professors Robert Matveevich Klimin and Oleg Vasilyevich Krivenok, Honored Worker of Industry of Belarus Makarevich, artist Valery Pavlovich Chaika, Archpriest Fedor Povny (Abbot of Minsk), and Dmitry Bashko (USA).

=== Personal life and death ===
Ninel Aladova was married to the architect Valmen Nikolaevich Aladov, with whom she had two children. She died on September 18, 2021, at the age of 87.

== Creativity ==
Aladova was the author of a number of implemented projects, including the building of the Research Institute of Plant Protection in Priluki, Minsk district (1960, by the author's team), the expansion of the main building of the National Academy of Sciences of Belarus (1965), the Central Children's Sports School in Minsk (1968), the main building of the sanatorium "Krynitsa" in Zhdanovichi, Minsk district (1966), the interiors of the Lenin Library (1965), and the interiors of the Palace of Culture of the MTZ (1985).

She was the author of publications on architecture, including the book "Recommendations for the organization of interiors of trade halls" (Minsk, 1971).

== Awards ==
- Winner of the 4th National Festival of Architecture (2005).
- Diploma of the World Triennial in Sofia (2000).
- Diploma of the Council of Ministers of Belarus (2004).
- Diplomas of Ministries, public organizations and Belarusian State Academy of Music.

== Bibliography ==
Aladova was the author of more than 30 scientific publications including 8 books:

- «Рекомендации по организации торговых залов магазинов». — Мн: Полымя, 1971. — 48 с
- «Наша квартира». Мн. / Ростов на Дону: Мег-Феникс, 1999. —263 с
- «Наша квартира». Мн/Ростов на Дону: Мег-Феникс, 2002. — 297 с
- История интерьера и мебели.,Учебник для ВУЗов. — МН.: Технопринт, 2002, — 284 с
- «История интерьера и мебели». Ростов на Дону: Мег-Феникс, 2004. —400 с
