= Natalia Chernogolova =

Belarusian artist

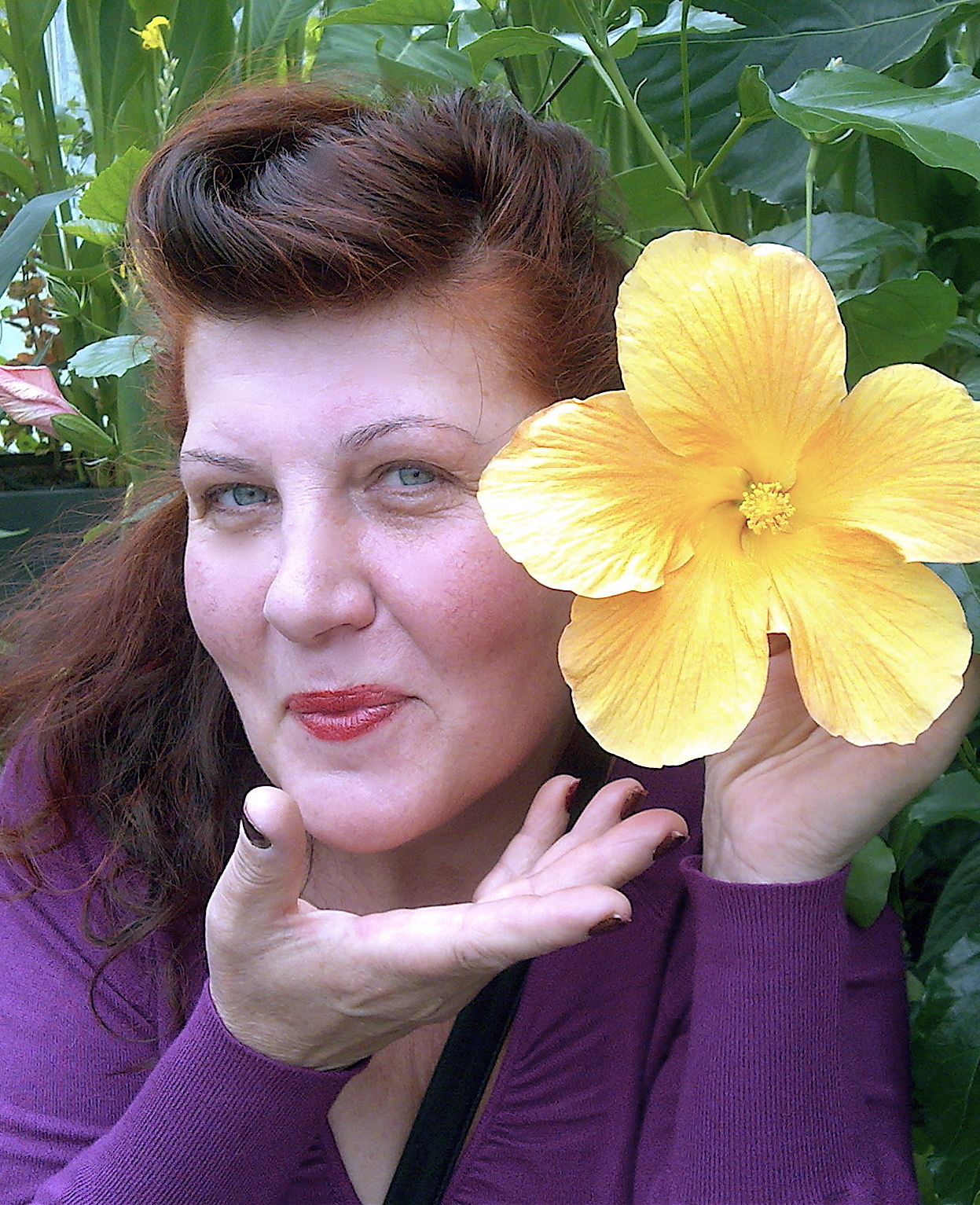
- Chernogolova in the Palm House, Kew in June 2009
- Born: 15 May 1954 (age 71); Zhitkovichi, Belorussian SSR, USSR

Natalia Chernogolova is a Belarusian artist.

== Biography ==
Chernogolova was born on 15 May 1954 in Zhitkovichi, Gomel Region, USSR (now Belarus). She graduated from the Minsk School of Art in 1976 and went on to study in the Art and Drawing Department of the Pedagogical Institute in Vitebsk, graduating in 1982. In 1989 she was elected to the USSR Union of Artists, undertaking various official commissions.

Natalia paints without preliminary sketches or drawings. "Painting is her life. She finds it impossible not to paint. She works with passion and vitality, and her love of life is evident in her work. Natalia has developed a way of painting using only her fingers. This, underpinned by her long classical training, enables her to capture the vigour and spirit that she sees in the subjects she has chosen."

She first visited the United Kingdom in 2005 when she created many vivid oil paintings of street scenes in Congleton and Cheshire landscapes. Her neo-expressionist paintings appear in collections and galleries in the US, UK, Germany, Belarus, Poland, Sweden, Denmark, Australia, Canada and Israel. She lives in Brest, Belarus.

== Exhibitions ==
- 1976—1988 — Brest, Minsk — Belarus
- 1988 — Gurzufa — Crimea
- 1989 — Minsk, Brest — Belarus
- 1990 — Minsk, Grodno — Belarus
- 1991 — Nałęczów — Poland
- 1992 — Nałęczów, Katowice, Puławy, Gołąb — Poland; Brest - Belarus; Ostrowiec, Biała — Poland
- 1993 — Zakopane, Krynica, Nałęczów — Poland
- 1994 — Nałęczów — Poland; Brest — Belarus
- 1995 — Brest — Belarus
- 1996 — Zakopane — Poland
- 1997 — Brest, Minsk — Belarus
- 1998 — Brest, Minsk — Belarus
- 1999 — Siedlce — Poland
- 2000 — Puławy — Poland
- 2001 — Biała — Poland
- 2002 — Puławy — Poland
- 2005 — Brest — Belarus
- 2005 — Galeria Andre (www.galeriaandre.com) — Warsaw and worldwide
- 2006 — Manchester Central Library, UK: Colours of Love, 25 July-29 September
- 2009 — National Gallery Palace of Art, Minsk, Belarus
- 2009 — Landmark Arts Centre, Teddington, UK, 19–21 June
- 2010 — Todmorden Fine Art, Todmorden, Lancashire, UK, March
- 2014 — Belarusian Palace of Art, Minsk

== Notes and references ==
- Belarus National State TV and Radio:
- Radio Belarus:
- Galeria Andre:
