= Uladzimyer Prakulevich =

Belarusian politician and writer

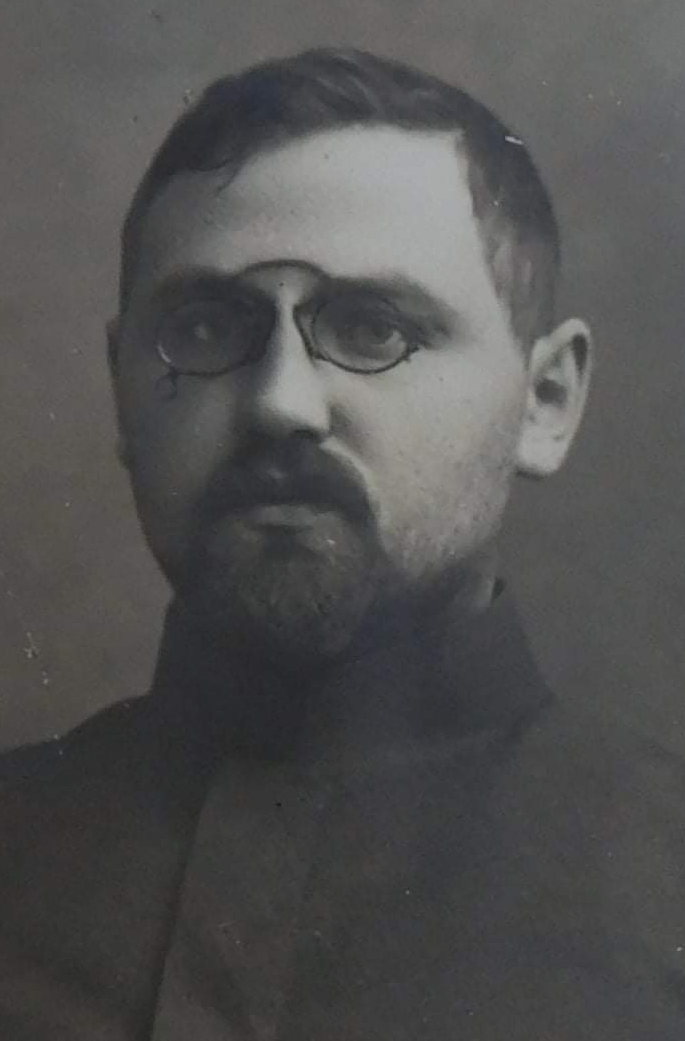

Uladzimyer (Uladzimir) Prakulevich (Belarusian: Уладзімер Пракулевіч, 1887 – August 20, 1938) was a Belarusian politician, writer and lawyer.

== Education ==
He graduated from the Imperial Moscow University in 1912. During his studies Prakulevich was member of the local Marxist movement and wrote for several Moscow Marxist journals.

== Career ==
Since 1912 he worked at the governmental administration in Minsk. With the begin of the World War I Uladzimier Prakulevich was evacuated to Moscow. He returned to Minsk in July 1917.

In 1918 U. Prakulevich was elected head of the local court in Slutsk.

In 1921 U. Prakulevich was one of the leaders of the anti-bolshevik Slutsk defence action. In 1921 he fled to Vilnia, West Belarus, where he took the position of the foreign secretary of the Belarusian Socialist-Revolutionary Party. In 1922, he was expelled by the Polish authorities to the Republic of Lithuania, along with other 33 Belarusian political activists. Since August 1923, Prakulevich worked as State Secretary of the Belarusian Democratic Republic government in exile in Prague.

In May 1926, Prakulevich settled in the Belarusian Soviet Socialist Republic where he worked at the State Library of the BSSR and was secretary of the bibliographic commission of the Belarusian Culture Institute and the Belarusian Academy of Sciences.

Uladzimier Prakulevich was arrested by the GPU on 19 July 1930 as part of the Case of the Union of Liberation of Belarus together with other Belarusian political and cultural activists in the BSSR. In April 1932, he was sentenced to 2 years of concentration camp in Perm. He was again arrested in 1938 and killed by the NKVD.

== Sources ==
- Леанід Маракоў. Рэпрэсаваныя літаратары, навукоўцы, работнікі асветы, грамадскія і культурныя дзеячы Беларусі. 1794-1991. Том II
