= Chashniki district =

District of Vitebsk region, Belarus

Chashniki district Чашніцкі раён (Belarusian)
- District
- Flag Coat of arms

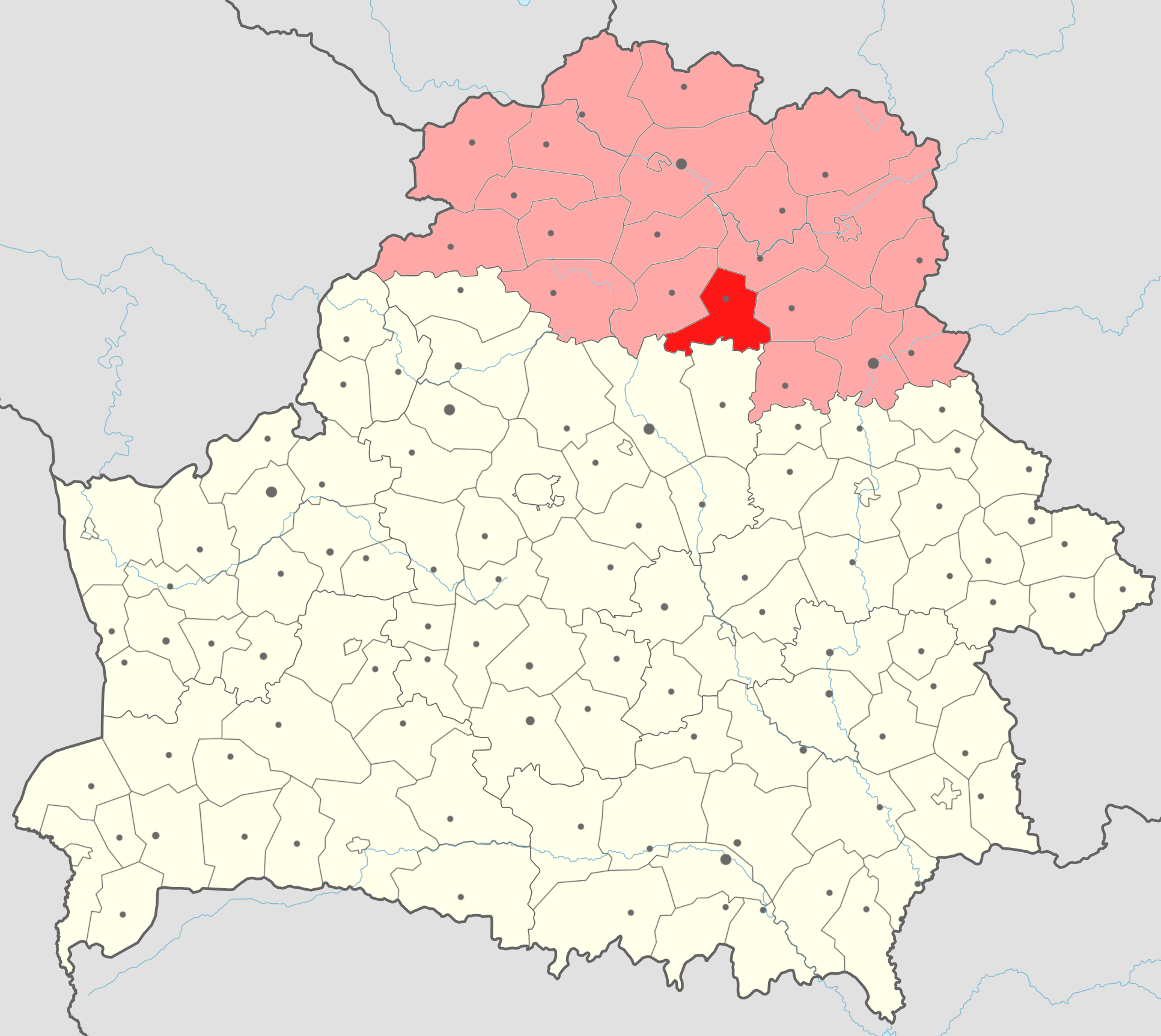
- Coordinates: 54°51′12″N 29°09′53″E
- Country: Belarus
- Region: Vitebsk region
- Administrative center: Chashniki

Area
  - Total: 1,481.12 km^{2} (571.86 sq mi)
- Elevation: 144 m (472 ft)

Population (2023)
  - Total: 27,047
  - Density: 18.261/km^{2} (47.296/sq mi)
- Time zone: UTC+3 (MSK)

Chashniki district or Čašniki district (Belarusian: Чашніцкі раён; Russian: Чашникский район) is a district (raion) of Vitebsk region in Belarus. Its administrative center is Chashniki.

Lake Lukomlskoye, the fourth largest lake in the country is situated here. The Vula River flows through this district.

== Notable residents ==
- Wasyl Ciapiński (c. 1430/1540s, Ciapina village – c. 1599/1600), Belarusian-Lithuanian noble, humanist, educator, writer, publisher and translator from the Grand Duchy of Lithuania known for translating the Bible into the Belarusian language
- Uladzimyer Prakulevich (1887, Krasnaluki village – 1938), Belarusian politician, writer and lawyer, victim of Stalin’s purges
