= Ruba, Belarus =

Urban-type settlement in Belarus

Coordinates: 55°18′08″N 30°18′42″E

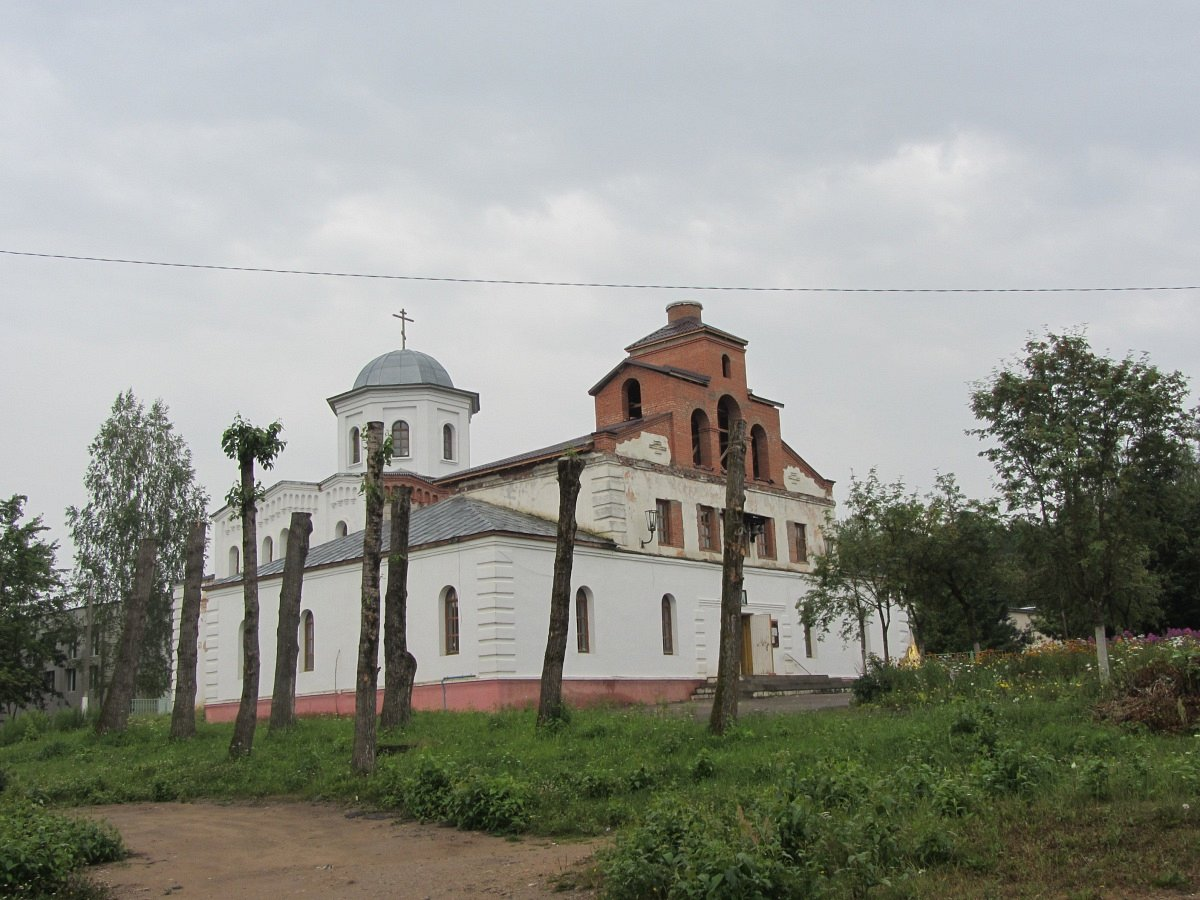
Orthodox church in Ruba

Ruba (Ру́ба) is an urban-type settlement in Vitebsk Region, Belarus, with urban-type status since 1970. It is subordinated to the vykankam (executive committee) of the Čyhunačny District of Vitebsk.

Nearby is the Museum‑Manor of I. E. Repin “Zdravnyova”, located on Repin’s former estate, also transliterated as “Zdravnevo”.
