= Viktar Kopach =

Belarusian sculptor

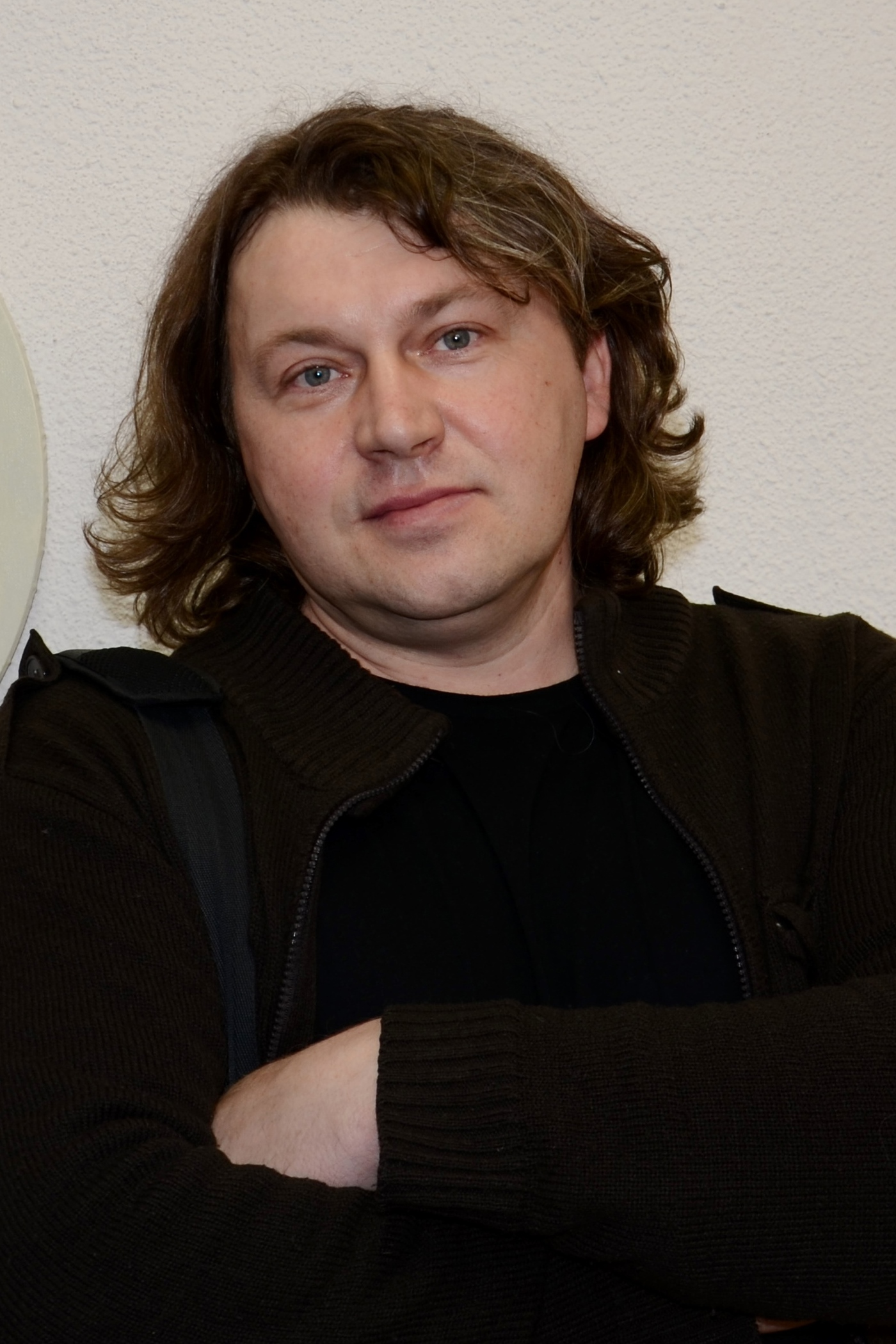
- Born: Viktar Casimiravich Kopach; 24 August 1970; Kopachi, Grodno Region, Belarus
- Known for: Sculpture
- Awards: 2013 – Third Prize, 2014 Qingdao International Horticultural Expo International Sculpture Competition China 2011 – Second Prize, The 1st International Public Art Festival of Mudanjiang Jingpo Lake, China

Viktar Kopach (born 24 August 1970) is a Belarusian sculptor. He lives and works in Minsk.

== Biography ==
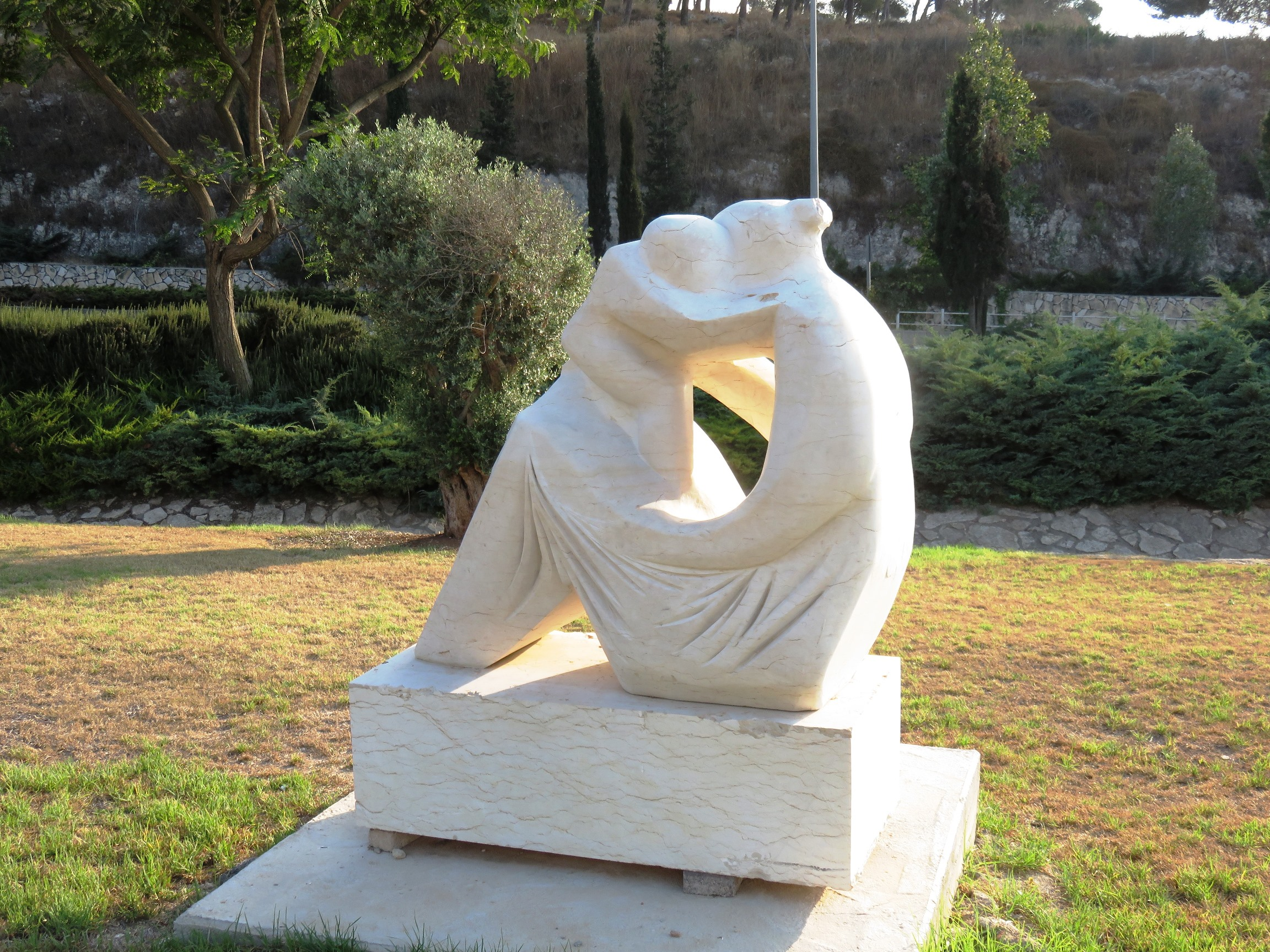
"Mother @ Child" (2013) in Creation sculpture park in Ma'alot-Tarshiha, Israel

He was born on 24 August 1970 in Kopachi, a village in the Masty district, Grodno Region of western Belarus. He moved to Minsk in 1986. His first exhibition was in 1993 at the Marc Chagall Art Center in Vitebsk, Belarus. A number of public space sculptures in Belarus, Russia, South Korea, China, Turkey, Brazil, Spain, Syria, Kazakhstan, Israel and Poland.

== Public works ==
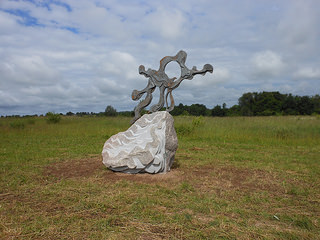
"Circulation in Nature" Sculpture in granite and cast iron by Viktar Kopach

- 2014 – "Circulation in Nature", Pedvale Open Air Museum, Sabile, Latvia
- 2013 – "Mother and Child", Ma'alot Tarshiha, Israel
- 2013 – "Circulation in Nature", Bursa, Turkey
- 2013 – "Circulation in Nature", Istanbul, Turkey
- 2012 – "Trinity", Tongling, China.
- 2012 – "Waterfall", Ma'alot Tarshiha, Israel
- 2012 – "Patroness of rhythmic gymnastics", Mersin, Turkey
- 2012 – "Circulation in Nature", Luleburgaz, Turkey
- 2012 – "Circulation in Nature", Kartal, Turkey
- 2011 – "Dialogue", Oskemen, Kazakhstan
- 2011 – "Waves", Boryeong, South Korea
- 2011 – "Equilibrium", Tsinghua University Centennial, Campus, Beijing, China
- 2010 – "Sunrise", Nanqu Zhongshan, China.
- 2010 – "Circulation in Nature", İzmir, Turkey
- 2010 – "Nudes", Damascus, Syria
- 2009 – "Sunrise", Fu Jian Province, Huian, China
- 2009 – "Equilibrium", International Sculpture Park, Ürümqi, China
- 2009 – "Reformer", Trakya University, Edirne, Turkey
- 2009 – "A story of love", International Sculpture Park, Penza, Russia
- 2008 – "Family", Mosan Art Museum, Gaehwa Park, Boryeongsi, Chungnam, South Korea
- 2008 – "Sand Glass", Changchun World Sculpture Park, Changchun, China
- 2008 – "Mother and Child", Changchun sister city Sculpture Park, Changchun, China
- 2008 – "The solidarity", Salihli, Manisa, Turkey
- 2008 – "Circulation in Nature", Antalya, Turkey
- 2007 – "Global warming", Escuela del Mármol de Fines, Andalucia, Spain
- 2005 – "Family", Cartódromo de Brusque, Santa Catarina, Brazil
- 2004 – "Sand Glass", Cartódromo de Brusque, Santa Catarina, Brazil
- 2004 – "Angel", Mogilev, Belarus
- 2003 – "Shail", Mogilev State A. Kuleshov University, Belarus
- 1996 – "Was reclining" Minsk, Belarus

== Awards ==
- 2015 – Third Prize, Kish Island international Sculpture symposium, Iran
- 2013 – Third Prize, 2014 Qingdao International Horticultural Expo International Sculpture Competition China.
- 2004 – Second Prize, Granite Sculpture Symposium, Mogilev, Belarus. Selected as an official representative of Belarus' for the building of the Monument to Mankind. (2002 – "Monument To Mankind" ).
