= Boris Zaborov =

Belarusian-French artist (1935–2021)

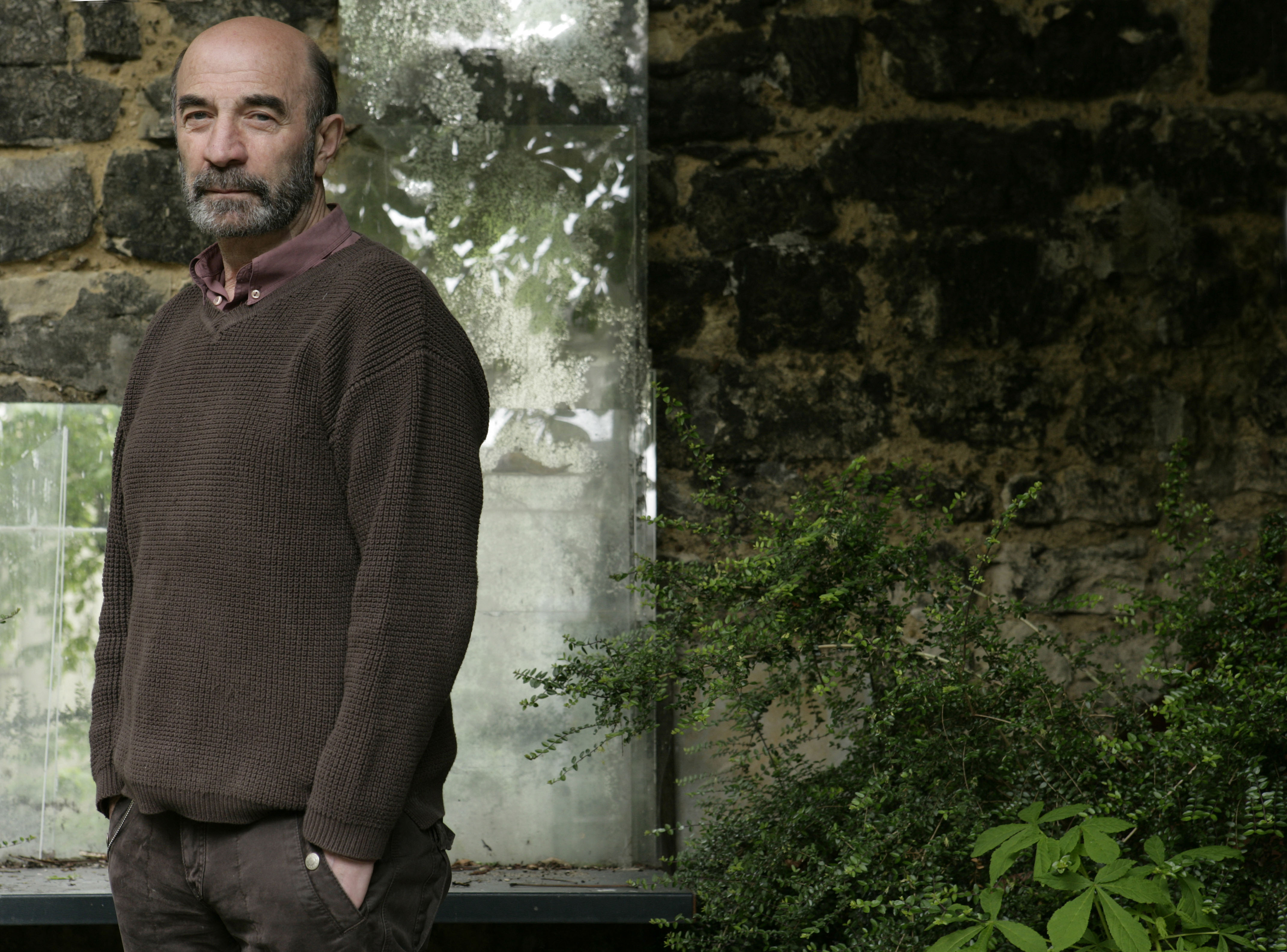
Boris Zaborov

Boris Abramovich Zaborov (Belarusian: Барыс Абрамавіч Забораў; 16 October 1935 – 20 January 2021) was a Belarusian and French artist. He moved to Paris, France in 1980 to begin a career in painting that resulted in numerous exhibitions and increasing recognition in European, American, and Russian art circles.

== Early life ==
Zaborov was born in 1935 in Minsk to Abram Zaborov and Esfir Rappoport and, with his family, experienced the German invasion and occupation of Minsk in World War II. When his family returned to Minsk after the war, they found the city in ruins. In 1950 he enrolled in the Minsk Fine Arts School, leaving in 1953 for Leningrad and the entrance exams at the Academy of Fine Arts. Although he failed the exam, he was accepted the following year as a first year student.

He described his time at the Academy as a wonderfully self-contained existence, relatively isolated from the Soviet system. At the end of his second year, he participated in the obligatory painting summer in the Crimea, a summer that had little effect on his painting style but was a turning point in his personal life. Zaborov met a girl from Moscow and that autumn he entered the Surikov Art Institute in Moscow. He earned its diploma in 1961. The atmosphere in Moscow was radically different, much more engaged with the outside world. When he left, he moved back to Minsk and began to illustrate books to earn money. He found it increasingly difficult to paint according to a personal vision that fell outside of the Soviet government's approved style.

=== Paris ===
Zaborov resolved his dilemma by moving to Paris in May 1981. While free to paint what he wanted, he also found himself alone. He used this loneliness, combined with a folder of family photos brought from the Soviet Union, to create a unified artistic vision that continued to inform his work. In Paris he had his first solo art show. He participated in numerous exhibitions in galleries and museums, in Paris and around the world.

== Selected works ==
- Monument à l’Écrit, bronze four meters high sculpture, installed at the entrance of the campus of the Technion at Haïfa, Israel (Collaboration with the 2 architects : Shaul Kaner and Michael Seltser) Technion Sculpture map
- Musée des Offices Boris Zaborov aux Offices de Florence (in French). Florence, Italy
