= Kamerny Theatre =

Coordinates: 55.7619°N 37.6025°E

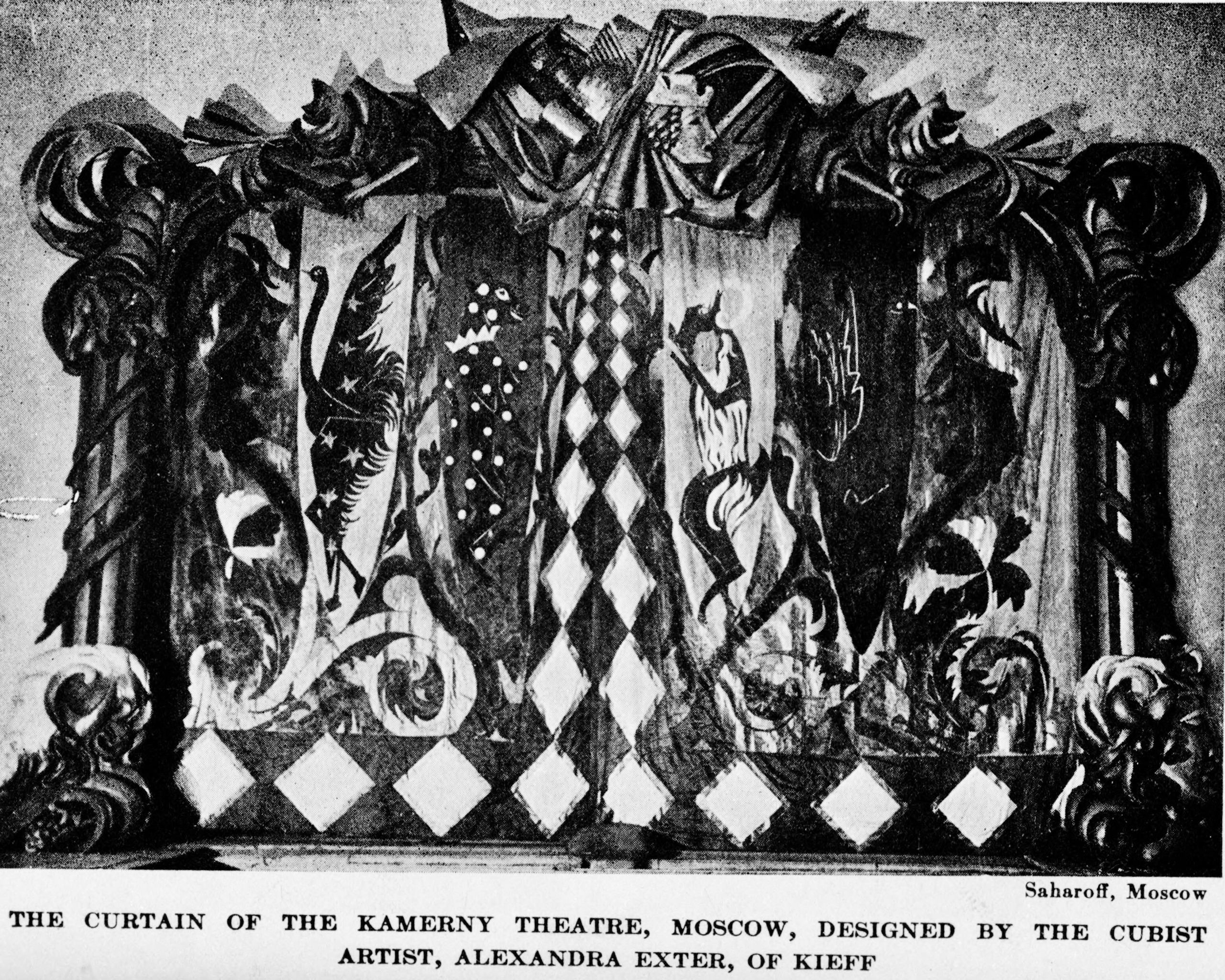
A curtain at the Kamerny Theatre.

The Kamerny Theatre was a chamber theatre in Moscow, founded in 1914 by director Alexander Tairov (1885–1950). Over the next 35 years, this small, intimate theater became "recognized as a major force in Russian theater". Considered among the better presentations staged at the theater were: Princess Brambilla (1920), Phèdre and Giroflé-Girofla (1922), Desire Under the Elms (1926), Day and Night (1926), The Negro (1929), The Beggars' Opera (1930) and Vishnevsky's An Optimistic Tragedy (1933). Tairov's primary collaborator in building the sets was Aleksandra Ekster, and these were based upon the period's constructivist style. The decor for the theatre was designed by Konstantin Medunetsky.

For three decades the theater survived the effects of the Russian Revolution by remaining unpolitical, instead adopting a post-revolutionary romantic idealism and relying heavily on classical material from the east and west. However, in 1928, the Kamerny put on Crimson Island by Mikhail Bulgakov, which was a satire that openly mocked the government. As a result, Stalin labeled the Kamerny 'a real bourgeois theater'. Thereafter, the theater had need to reform their presentation. The Soviet authorities developed a deep distrust of Tairov, calling him the last representative of the "bourgeois aestheticism".

In 1937, the Realistic Theater was merged with the Kamerny. In World War II, the theater was heavily bombed during the siege of Moscow and it did not re-open until December 25, 1943. The last production staged at the Kamerny was The Seagull by Anton Chekhov in 1946. The same year the Soviet communist party "condemned all formalism and experimentation in literature and the arts". The Kamerny was closed in 1949 as a result of the Zhdanov Doctrine.
