= Optimistic Tragedy (film) =

- USSR film poster
- Directed by: Samson Samsonov
- Written by: Samson Samsonov; Sofiya Vishnevetskaya
- Starring: Margarita Volodina; Boris Andreyev; Vyacheslav Tikhonov
- Cinematography: Vladimir Monakhov
- Music by: Vasiliy Dekhterev
- Production company: Mosfilm
- Release date: 12 June 1963
- Running time: 121 minutes
- Country: Soviet Union
- Language: Russian

Optimistic Tragedy (Russian: Оптимистическая трагедия, translit. Optimisticheskaya tragediya) is a 1963 Soviet film directed by Samson Samsonov. It is based on the play An Optimistic Tragedy by Vsevolod Vishnevsky.

During Russian Revolution of 1917, the Marine squad, led by anarchist leader Vozhak starts the revolt. The Central Committee of the Bolshevik Party sends a woman Commissar to form Red Army battalion from the marines to take part in the Russian Civil War.

== Plot ==
In 1918, aboard the warship Gromoboy, anarchist sailors hold control until a woman commissar is sent by the Bolshevik Central Committee to impose order. The anarchist leader, Vozhak, dominates the crew, while the commissar is tasked with reorganizing the naval unit into the First Sailors' Regiment to fight on the Black Sea front. Among the few remaining officers is Lieutenant Bering, a former tsarist navy officer from the battleship Imperator Pavel I, who is appointed to lead the regiment alongside the commissar. Her mission proves challenging as she must earn the sailors’ trust and eradicate the rampant anarchy.

Vozhak incites an attempt to assault the commissar, but she defends herself, shooting one of the attackers and declaring defiantly, "Well, who else wants to try the commissar's body?" Despite pressure from his follower, the syphilitic Sipy, to kill her, Vozhak refuses, arguing that her anarchistic spirit makes her valuable. A tense dialogue ensues between the commissar, Vozhak, Sipy, and another anarchist sailor, Alexei, as they debate their loyalties and purpose. The commissar asserts the Bolsheviks’ direction and determination, even amidst resistance and skepticism. When the unit is reformed and sent to the front, the sailors confront difficult moral choices. Vozhak orders the execution of two former officers, only for the commissar to retaliate by commanding Alexei to execute Vozhak. Sipy betrays the unit, leading to their capture by German forces. The commissar is killed, but Alexei and a few others manage to escape captivity.

== Cast ==
- Margarita Volodina as Commissar
- Boris Andreyev as Vozhak
- Vyacheslav Tikhonov as Aleksey
- Vsevolod Sanayev as Sipliy
- Erast Garin as Vozhachok
- Vsevolod Safonov
- Oleg Strizhenov as First officer
- Gleb Strizhenov
- Valentin Belokhvostik
- Ivan Bondar

== Production ==
The film Optimistic Tragedy is based on the 1933 play An Optimistic Tragedy by Vsevolod Vishnevsky, set during the Russian Revolution.

Samson Samsonov directed the film.

It was shot in Sovscope 70 on black and white film stock. The prints were split into three films for exhibition in Kinopanorama 70 in some theatres.

== Release ==
The film was entered into competition at the 1963 Cannes Film Festival.

The Kino International in East Berlin opened on 15 November 1963 with a grand opening premiere of the film.

== Reception ==
Optimistic Tragedy was a Soviet blockbuster of 1963, with 46 million tickets sold.

The film was named Best Film of the Year and Margarita Volodina was named Best Actress of the Year by readers of the Soviet film magazine Sovetsky Ekran.

Richard Porton, in his 1999 book Film and the Anarchist Imagination, describes Optimistic Tragedy as "ingloriously didactic" and "typical of Soviet attempts to rationalize the brutal assault on the Kronstadt communards".
