= Gleb Glebov =

Belarusian actor

- Глеб Глебаў
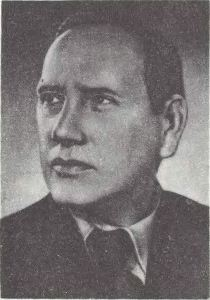
- Born: Gleb Pavlovich Sorokin; May 11, 1899; Voznesensk, Kherson Governorate, Russian Empire (present-day Ukraine)
- Died: March 3, 1967 (aged 67); Minsk, Byelorussian SSR, Soviet Union
- Occupation: Actor

Gleb Pavlovich Glebov (Note: Belarusian: Глеб Паўлавіч Глебаў, romanized: Hlyeb Pawlavich Hlyebaw; Russian: Глеб Па́влович Гле́бов, romanized: Gleb Pavlovich Glebov) (May 11, 1899 – March 3, 1967, born Sorokin) (Note: Belarusian: Сарокін, romanized: Sarokin; Russian: Соро́кин, romanized: Sorokin) was a Soviet and Belarusian theater and film actor. People's Artist of the USSR (1948).

== Biography ==
Glebov was born on April 29 (May 11; NS), 1899 in Voznesensk (now Mykolaiv region of Ukraine) (according to other sources, in Voskresensk, now Moscow region) in the family of a railway employee, who was an aspiring actor.

In 1920, he graduated from the Bendera men's gymnasium. From 1920 to 1921, he studied at the Odessa Polytechnic Institute.

From 1921 to 1923, Glebov was an actor of the Odessa Russian Drama Group (now the Odesa Oblast Academic Drama Theater); from 1924 to 1925, the Nikolaev Theater of Russian Drama (now the Mykolaiv Academic Artistic Drama Theater); from 1925 to 1926, the Voznesensk Russian Drama Theater.

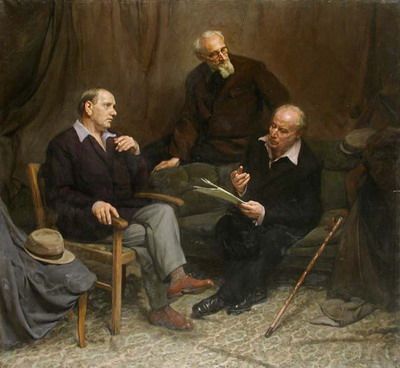
Group portrait by Valentin Volkov of Belarusian actors, Glebov, Mariks, and Vladimirkiy (1959)

From 1926, Glebov was an actor of the 1st Belarusian Drama Theater (now the Yanka Kupala National Academic Theater), and between 1941 and 1947, he was an artistic director.

In 1943, Glebov led the theater's front-line brigade.

Glebov was a Deputy of the Supreme Soviet of the USSR of the 6th convocation (1962–1966).

Gleb Glebov died on March 3, 1967, in Minsk, Belarus.

== Theater ==
- 1932 — "Batkovshchina" by Chorny as Nemir
- 1937 — "The Miser" by Moliere as Harpagon
- 1938 — "Partisans" by Nettle as Halimon
- 1939 — "The Death of the Wolf" by Samuylenok as Kharkevich
- 1939 — "Who Laughs Last" by Nettle as Tulyaga
- 1944 — "Paulinka" by Yanka Kupala as Pustarevich
- 1947 — "Konstantin Zaslonov" by Movzon as Kroplia
- 1950 — "Kalinovaya Roscha" by Korneichuk as Romanyuk
- 1954 — "Excuse Me, Please" by Makajonak as Peas
- 1959 — "So That People Do Not Scold" by Makajonak as Samoseev
- 1959 — "Day of Wonderful Deceptions" by R.B. Sheridan as Mendoza

== Awards and Titles ==
- People's Artist of the Byelorussian SSR (1940)
- People's Artist of the USSR (1948)
- Stalin Prize of the second degree (1941) for great achievements in the field of theatrical and dramatic art
- Stalin Prize of the second degree (1948) for the performance of the role of Kropli in the play "Konstantin Zaslonov" by A. Movzon
- Two Orders of Lenin (1940, 1955)
- Two Orders of the Red Banner of Labour (1944, 1948)
- Medal "For Valiant Labour in the Great Patriotic War 1941–1945" (1945)

== Family ==
- Father, Pavel Sorokin, railway employee; aspiring actor
- Wife, Nadezhda Sorokina, actress
- Granddaughter, Zoya Belakhvostik, actress
- Son-in-law, Valentin Belakhvostik, actor

== Bibliography ==
- Дуніна С., Г. П. Глебов. — М.; Л., 1949
- Стэльмах У. М., Народны артыст СССР Г. П. Глебаў. — Мн., 1954
- Красінскі А. В., Беларускія акцёры ў кіно. — Мн., 1973
