= Kupala (disambiguation) =

Kupala is a deity created by medieval chroniclers based on the name of the Kupala Night holiday.

Kupala or Kupała may also refer to:

- Kupała (film), a 2020 film dramatising the life of Belarusian poet Janka Kupała
- Yanka Kupala (also spelled Janka Kupała), Belarusian poet
- Kupala Night (also called Ivanа Kupala), a traditional Slavic holiday
