= Alisa Koonen =

Russian and Soviet actress (1889–1974)

- Алиса Коонен
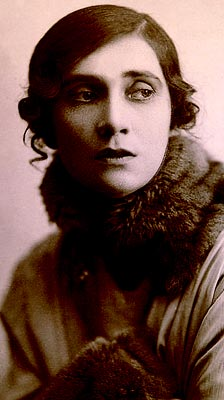
- Born: October 17, 1889; Moscow, Russia
- Died: August 20, 1974; Moscow, Soviet Union
- Other names: Alice Coonen
- Known for: Theatre
- Spouse: Alexander Tairov
- Awards: People's Artist of the RSFSR (1935); Order of the Red Banner of Labour (1954)

Alisa Georgiyevna Koonen (Russian: Алиса Георгиевна Коонен), also known as Alice Coonen (October 17 [O.S. October 5] 1889 – August 20, 1974), was a Russian and Soviet actress and the wife of the director Alexander Tairov.

== Biography ==
=== Early life ===
Koonen was born in Moscow in a family of Belgian origin. At age 16 she joined the Moscow Art Theatre and studied with Stanislavski. She first appeared on the stage in Woe from Wit in 1906.

=== Career ===
At 19 she had her first major role, Mytyl in The Blue Bird (1908); she also performed Masha in Leo Tolstoy’s The Living Corpse and Anitra in Ibsen’s Peer Gynt. In 1913, Koonen moved to the Free Theatre of Konstantin Mardzhanov, which lasted only one season. There she met and married Tairov, and in 1914 they created the Chamber Theater, where she became a leading actress. She had a wide range, but became best known as a tragic actress; Mark Slonim called her "an unusually talented interpreter of tragic parts, endowed with a rich voice and rhythmic power." After the October Revolution, in 1918 Tairov "presented Oscar Wilde's Salomé to haggard, starved audiences who jammed the frozen hall"; Koonen was "a passionate, aggressive Salomé." In 1949, Koonen left the theater with her husband, who died the following year.

According to The Great Soviet Encyclopedia, her most outstanding role was the Woman Commissar in Vsevolod Vishnevsky’s An Optimistic Tragedy (1933); her other great roles included the heroine of Scribe and Legouvé’s Adrienne Lecouvreur, Abbie in Eugene O'Neill’s Desire Under the Elms and Ella in his The Hairy Ape, Ellen in Sophie Treadwell's Machinal, Katerina in Alexander Ostrovsky's The Storm, the title role in the stage adaptation of Flaubert’s Madame Bovary, and Kruchinina in Ostrovsky's Guilty Without Fault (Bez viny vinovatye). Her concert repertoire included verses by Alexander Blok and Ivan Turgenev as well as selections from Chamber Theater productions.

=== Death ===
On August 20, 1974, Koonen died in Moscow and was buried at Novodevichy Cemetery.

== Awards and accolades ==
- People's Artist of the RSFSR (1935)
- Order of the Red Banner of Labour (1954)
