= Kupała (film) =

- Directed by: Uladzimier Jankoŭski
- Written by: Aliaksandra Barysava and Alena Kalunova
- Starring: Mikalaj Śestak (aka Nikolay Shestak)
- Production company: Belarusfilm
- Release date: 2020
- Country: Belarus
- Languages: Belarusian, Russian

Kupała (Belarusian: Купала) is a biopic produced by BelarusFilm in 2020 which dramatises the turbulent and tragic life of Belarusian poet Janka Kupała.

The film was directed by Belarusian director Uladzimier Jankoŭski (aka Vladimir Yankovskiy) based on a storyline written by Aliaksandra Barysava and Alena Kalunova and starred Mikalaj Śestak (aka Nikolay Shestak), a Latvian actor with Belarusian roots, in lead role.

The official release of the film has been postponed due to the political situation in Belarus and Russia:

== Plot ==
“The film reveals the main milestones of the poet's life and career, coinciding with the most tragic events of the 20th century”.

“The fate of Kupała is written in the historical context and is closely connected with the fate of Belarus. Standing at the origins of the formation of the [modern] Belarusian nation, Kupała witnessed the birth of hopes for national revival and became a hostage of the totalitarian Soviet system. The complex personal story of the poet, the clash of the poet and the authorities, the huge poetic gift and love for the native land - all this formed the basis of the plot of the film. "Kupała" is a film about hope, about the continuity of history, about the poet as the embodiment of the national idea of an entire nation."

“The film speaks about love and hate, war and revolution, life and death, creativity and literary gift. What is seen on screen is a story of an outstanding person, a poet of rare talent, whose personal drama and whose mysterious death still excite the minds of researchers and fans”.

== Cast ==
- Mikalaj Śestak (aka Nikolay Shestak) as adult Janka Kupała;
- Aliena Hiranok (aka Elena Girenok (Pobegaeva)) as Uladislava Stankievič (Lucevič), teacher, Kupała's wife;
- Vieranika Pliaškievič (akа Veronika Plyashkevich) as Paŭlina Miadziolka, Belarusian actress, Kupała ’s inamorata;
- Hanna Palupanava (aka Anna Polupanova) as Kupała ’s mother, Bianihna Valasievič (Lucevič);
- Aliaksandar Abramovič (aka Alexandr Abramovich) as Kupała's father, Daminik Lucevič;
- Aliaksandar Illin (aka Alexandr Ilin) as Aliaxandar Kušnier;
- Aliaksandar Efremaŭ (aka Alexandr Efremov) as Uładzimier Samojła, Belarusian publicist, literary critic;
- Siarhej Čekieres (aka Sergei Chekeres) as Anton Liavicki (pen name Jadvihin Š.), Belarusian writer, playwright, publicist;
- Uladzimier Jankoŭski(aka Vladimir Yankovskiy) as Branislaŭ Epimach-Šypila, Belarusian publisher, literary critic and folklorist;
- Maksim Krečataŭ (aka Maksim Krechetov) as Zmicier Žylunovič (pen name Ciška Hartny), Belarusian poet, writer and political leader;
- Uladzimier Hlotaŭ (aka Vladimir Glotov) as Samuil Plaŭnik (pen name Zmitrok Biadula), Belarusian poet, writer and political activist;
- Ihar Dzianisaŭ (aka Igor Denisov) as Zyhmunt Čachovič, one of the leaders of the January Uprising, an acquaintance of young Janka Kupała;
- Siarhej Žbankoŭ (aka Sergey Zhbankov) as Alies Burbis, Belarusian political activist, publicist and actor;
- Ruslan Chernetsky as Anton Luckievič, leader of the Belarusian independence movement and Prime Minister of the Belarusian Democratic Republic;
- Dzianis Paršyn (aka Denis Parshin) as Ivan Luckievič, leading figure of the Belarusian independence movement, publicist and archaeologist;
- Zmicier Jesianievič (aka Dmitriy Esenevich) as Francišak Umiastoŭski, Belarusian writer, poet and publicist;
- Siarhej Hadkoŭ (aka Sergei Godkov) as Siarhiej Palujan, Belarusian writer and literary critic;
- Heorgi Lojka (aka Georgi Loyka) as Jakub Kolas, Belarusian writer;
- Aliaksandar Cimoškin (aka Alexandr Timoshkin) as Usevalad Ihnatoŭski, Belarusian politician, scholar and first President of the National Academy of Sciences of Belarus;
- Andrej Dušačkin (aka Andrey Dushechkin) as Uladzimier Pičeta, Belarusian historian and first rector of the Belarusian State University;
- Siarhej Jurevič (aka Sergey Yurevich) as Sciapan Niekraševič, Belarusian academic and political figure;
- Maksim Duboŭski (aka Maksim Dubovskiy) as Arkadź Smolič, Belarusian academic and political activist;
- Illia Jasinski (aka Ilya Yasinski) as Vaclaŭ Lastoŭski, a leader of the Belarusian independence movement and Prime Minister of the Belarusian Democratic Republic;
- Uladzimir Tsesler (aka Vladimir Tsesler) as Jazep Drazdovič, Belarusian painter, archaeologist and ethnographer;
- Vera Paliakova (aka Vera Polyakova) as Princess Magdalena Radziwill, an aristocrat who financed Belarusian Catholic and national revival initiatives;
- Uladzimier Miščančuk (aka Vladimir Mishchanchuk) as Jan Offenberg, doctor and political activist;
- Anatol Holub (aka Anatoliy Golub) as Vladimir Zatonski, Soviet political and head of the Zatonski Commission;
- Aleh Koc (aka Oleg Kots) as Golubev, an officer of the Joint State Political Directorate (OGPU);
- Aleh Harbuz (aka Oleg Garbuz) as Šarkevič, an officer of the Joint State Political Directorate (OGPU);
- Jaŭchim Cuba (aka Yefim Tsuba) and Cimur Niadvied (aka Timur Nedved) as young Kupała;
- Siarhej Ulasaŭ (aka Sergei Vlasov) as Akim.

== Controversies ==
Designed as a flagship project of Belarusian state cinema company BelarusFilm, the film was due to be officially released in 2019. However, the release has been postponed and the film has so far been seen only by a select few critics and in pirate versions. The postponement is widely attributed to an anticipated hostile reaction in Russia to “a [Belarusian] post-colonial film [which depicts] Belarus [as] a colony first of the Russian Empire, and then the Soviet Empire...”, a film “designed to help [Belarusians] understand who [they] are”.

The film received a Cinematographic Event of the Year award at the second CIS international film festival in Moscow in November 2020. However, due to Covid restrictions, the film was seen by no more than 170 people.

Six months later, the film was viewed by several experts at a closed preview of the Eurasian Film Festival in Britain. The premiere was supposed to take place in Romford, East London, on an anniversary of the poet's death. However, two days before the screening, BelarusFilm withdrew the film from the competition. Most of the videos posted online have been deleted or blocked. As a result, the film was awarded the first anti-prize of the Eurasian Film Festival.

In April 2022, the film director confirmed that the rights to "Kupała" are held by BelarusFilm and that “the film is not permitted to be released yet”.
