= Alexander Kholminov =

Russian composer

Alexander Nikolaevich Kolminov (Александр Николаевич Хо́лминов; 8 September 1925 — 26 November 2015), PAU, was a Soviet and Russian composer.

He was educated at the Moscow Conservatory where he was a student of Evgeny Golubev. He graduated in 1950.

He is best known for the Soviet opera An Optimistic Tragedy based on the play of the same name by Vsevolod Vishnevsky. The role of the commissar was created by Anna Arkhipova.

== Operas ==
- An Optimistic Tragedy (Optimisticheskaya tragediya) 1965, after the play by Vishnevsky
- Anna Snegina (1967), after the poem by Sergey Esenin
