= Alexander Tairov =

Russian innovator of theatrical art

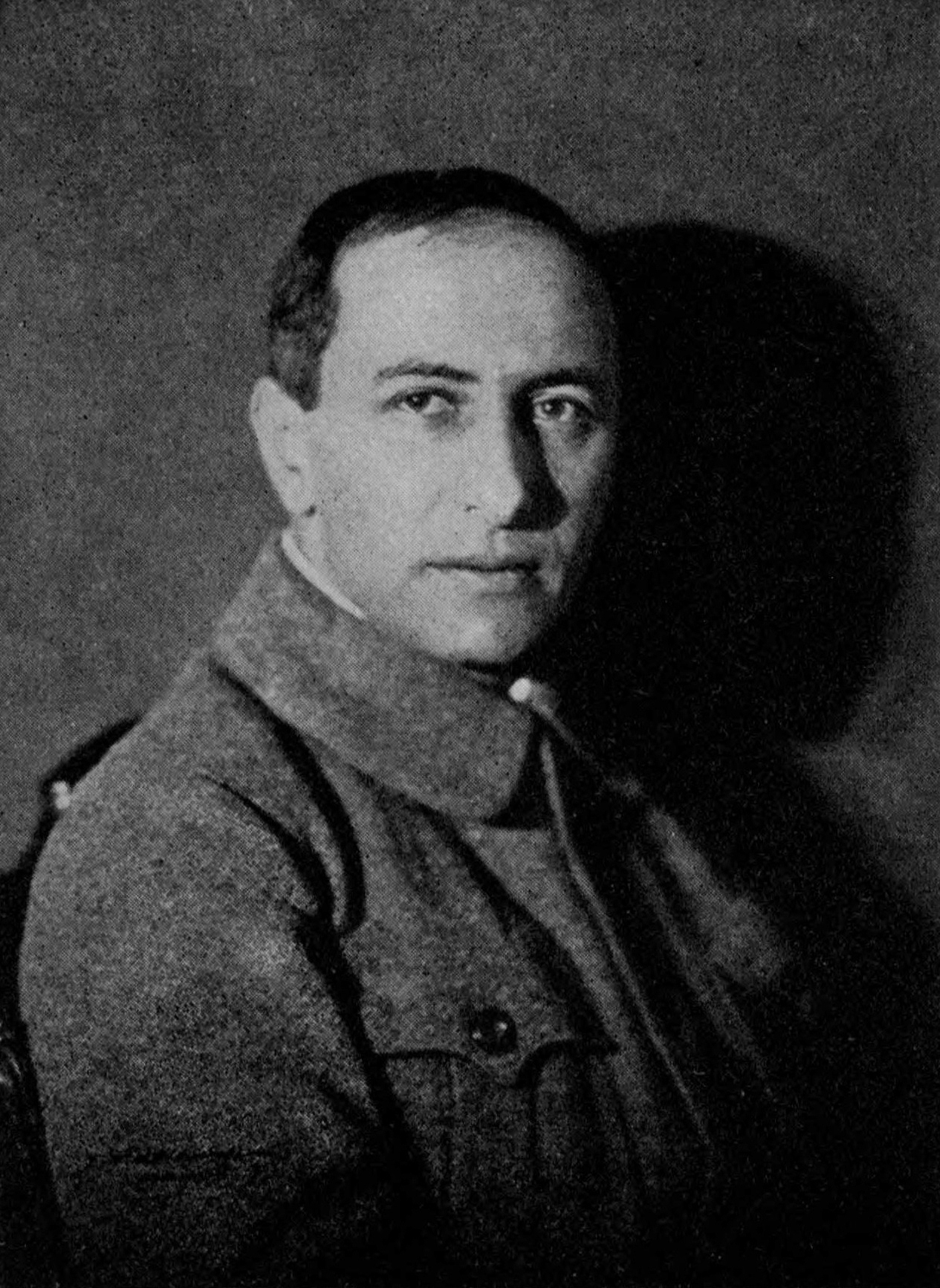

Alexander Yakovlevich Tairov (Russian: Алекса́ндр Я́ковлевич Таи́ров; Ukrainian: Олександр Якович Таїров; 6 July 1885 – 5 September 1950) was a leading innovator and theatre director in Russia before and during the Soviet era.

== Biography ==
=== Childhood ===
Aleksandr Tairov was born Aleksandr Yakovlevich Korenblit on July 6, 1885, in Romny, Russian Empire. His father, Yakov Korenblit, was the headmaster of a primary school in Berdichev. At the age of 10, young Tairov moved to Kiev and settled with his aunt, a retired actress. She introduced him to theatre. He took part in amateur performances and assumed the name Tairov as a pseudonym.

=== Experience ===
In 1904 he enrolled in the Law School at Kiev University. That same year Tairov married his cousin, Olga. In 1905 Tairov opposed the pogroms of Jews in Kiev. He was arrested by the Tsar's police and imprisoned. His second arrest led him to decide to move from Kiev to St. Petersburg.

=== Theatrical beginnings ===
In 1906 Tairov was invited by the famous Russian actress Vera Komissarzhevskaya and joined her theatre as an actor under the directorship of Vsevolod Meyerhold. Tairov concurrently continued his studies in law at St. Petersburg University. There he started his lifelong friendship with Anatoli Lunacharsky. He collaborated with Vsevolod Meyerhold on a joint production of a play by Paul Claudel. Both directors were creating new experimental models for theatre in Russia. Tairov felt that the work of Meyerhold's actors was dictated by the production concept and that the actors were mere puppets. Soon Tairov left to join Pavel Gaideburov's company as a director.

=== Chamber Theatre ===
Tairov created a prototype of his Chamber Theatre as "synthetic theatre" with high goals in mind. As director he experimented with staging, acting, individual and group movements, stage and costume designs, and worked with every detail of theatrical performance in order to break away from the traditional theatre. Tairov's experimental approach spread to all phases of creating a stage show including even the rehearsals and practice. He used the music of Ludwig van Beethoven and Frédéric Chopin as a way of helping his actors achieve a special state of mind during their performances.

=== Riga ===
In 1912 Tairov was invited to direct a play in collaboration with the Russian Drama Theatre in Riga. There he was once again attacked by the local anti-Semites and was banned by the local authorities from staying and working in the city of Riga. The conflict took two weeks to resolve. Tairov prevailed, he stayed and completed his work for the Russian Drama Theatre in Riga. Upon his return to St. Petersburg, Tairov converted to Evangelical Lutheranism.

=== Moscow ===
In 1913 Tairov moved to Moscow. There he joined a corporation of attorneys at law and could continue a comfortable career. Instead, Tairov established himself as an important anti-realist director. With his wife, the actress Alisa Koonen, he founded the Kamerny (Chamber) Theatre in 1914; it became the centre of experimental creativity for many Russian actors, artists, writers, and musicians. Tairov was the first director in Russia to stage The Threepenny Opera by Bertolt Brecht. He staged classical play of Kalidasa - "Sakuntala", plays of Valery Bryusov, Eugene O'Neill, J.B. Priestley, Oscar Wilde, and other contemporary writers. Tairov collaborated with such artists as Alexandra Exter, Pavel Kuznetsov, Sergei Soudeikin, Mikhail Larionov, Natalya Goncharova, Vladimir Pohl, Inayat Khan and others. Tairov's Acting Studio became extremely popular among aspiring actors such as Vera Karalli, Yevgeni Lebedev, and others. He worked with composers Sergei Prokofiev, A. Aleksandrov, Georgi Sviridov, and Dmitri Kabalevsky.

=== After Revolution ===
After the Bolshevik Revolution of 1917, Tairov continued development of his independent approach to theatre. His early productions of the Soviet era were Salome by Oscar Wilde and Adrienne Lecouvrer, which became a legendary play and ran more than 800 performances. The Chamber Theatre remained very popular and toured across the Soviet Union. The Chamber Theatre's tours of Europe in 1923, and of South America in 1930 were critically acclaimed as "a total victory of the famous Russian innovator and a genius of staging".

=== Under Stalin in the 1930s ===
In 1929 Tairov produced Bagrovy Ostrov (The Crimson Island) by Mikhail Bulgakov. At that time Joseph Stalin began his total control of culture and labeled the play bourgeois. That was enough to trigger organized attacks on Tairov in the Soviet media. His next production of Vsevolod Vishnevskiy's Optimistic tragedy (1933) was criticized by Vyacheslav Molotov as a slander of Russian history. Tairov tried to defend his theatre, he stated that theatres must be established on the level of research institutes. "Pavlov has an institute on which millions are spent. Stanislavsky must have an institute too", said Tairov. As a punishment, Tairov's Chamber Theatre was sent to work in Siberia. However, unlike many other enemies of the regime, Tairov survived the Great Purges in which millions were imprisoned or executed.

=== Jewish Anti-Fascist Committee ===
In August 1941, though his theatre company had returned to Siberia, Tairov joined the Jewish Anti-Fascist Committee in Moscow. It was formed by the group of leading intellectuals to campaign against the Nazis during the Second World War. The Committee was headed by Solomon Mikhoels. Along with Tairov other prominent members were Emil Gilels, David Oistrakh, Samuil Marshak, Ilja Ehrenburg, and many other leading intellectuals in the Soviet Union. The main driving force of the Committee was represented by the group of Yiddish writers such as Perets Markish, Lev Kvitko, David Gofstein, Itsik Fefer, David Bergelson, and others. The Jewish Anti-Fascist Committee provided over 45 million rubles to the Soviet Red Army. After the end of the Second World War it was denounced by Joseph Stalin, and many of its members were executed by the Soviet secret service.

=== Under Stalin after World War II ===
In 1946 the Soviet Communist Party launched attacks on intellectuals in the Soviet Union. Such leading cultural figures as Anna Akhmatova, Sergei Prokofiev, Aram Khachaturian, Boris Pasternak, Mikhail Zoshchenko and many others suffered from censorship and severe repression. Tairov's Chamber Theatre was attacked for having little to do with contemporary Soviet life. Tairov tried to make additions to the repertoire and invited writer Alexander Galich, and young director Georgi Tovstonogov, but it was too late. In May 1949, the Soviet Committee for Arts issued an official order to close the theatre. Tairov's Chamber Theatre was accused of "Aesthetism and Formalism". Tairov was granted a personal pension and soon was hospitalized with brain cancer. He died on September 5, 1950, in Moscow, and was laid to rest in the Novodevichy Cemetery in Moscow, Russia.

== Timeline ==
- 1885 - Born Aleksandr Yakovlevich Korenblit, in Berdichev, Ukraine, Russian Empire.
- 1895 - Moved to Kiev, attended theatrical performances
- 1904 - Married his cousin, Olga.
- 1905 - Experienced pogrom in Kiev.
- 1906 - Moved to St. Petersburg and became an actor on invitation from Vera Komissarzhevkaya.
- 1907 - Directed plays in St. Petersburg in collaboration with Vsevolod Meyerhold
- 1912 - Directed a play in Riga, where he was arrested by anti-semitic police.
- 1913 - Tairov took up legal practice in Moscow. Konstantin Mardzhanov invited Tairov to join him in starting a theatre, but the venture folded after only a year.
- 1914 - Tairov opened the Kamerny Theatre, or Chamber Theatre, so named because he wanted to develop a select, appreciative audience.
- 1918 - Meyerhold and Tairov collaborated on a production of The Exchange in February, but the production was a failure.
- 1921 - Published aesthetic philosophy in Notes of a Director.
- 1923 - Tairov's acting school, which included classes such as improvisation, fencing, gymnastics, juggling, and theatre history, is granted official status. Also this year, the Kamerny Theatre tours to Paris, Berlin, Frankfurt, and Dresden.
- 1925 - Kamerny Theatre tours to Germany and Vienna.
- 1930 - Kamerny Theatre tours to Germany, Prague, Vienna, Italy, Paris, Buenos Aires, and Montevideo. Performances include Oscar Wilde's Salome, Alexander Ostrovsky's Storm, Eugene O'Neill's Desire Under the Elms, and Charles Lecocq's Girofle-Girofla.
- 1933 - Produced a socialist realist production of Optimistic Tragedy.
- 1935 - Awarded title of People's Artist.
- 1936 - Accused of formalism.
- 1937 - Merged with Okhlopkov's Realistic Theatre. This collaboration only lasted one year.
- 1939 - Ten-month tour to Eastern Russia which included performances of Madame Bovary and The Bedbug. This tour may have saved Tairov from the purge.
- 1941 - Kamerny Theatre was evacuated to Siberia where they performed for two years.
- 1945 - Received the Order of Lenin.
- 1949 - Kamerny Theatre closed. Tairov and his wife, actress Alisa Koonen transferred to the Vakhantangov Theatre.
- 1950 - Tairov dies in September.
- 1974 - Alice Koonen dies.

== Aesthetic philosophy ==
Tairov developed what he called "Synthetic Theatre" which incorporated ballet, opera, circus, music hall, and dramatic elements. He believed theatre was its own art and was not merely a means for transmitting literature. His productions were not subservient to their text. The acting school Tairov developed was to train a company of "master actors" who would excel in all of the elements of Synthetic Theatre and become the primary creators of performances. Tairov's productions employed Constructivist sets. One of his primary designers was Alexandra Exter who created sets and costumes for Famira Kifared, Salome and Romeo and Juliet. Her designs can be seen in the 1924 film Aelita Queen of Mars for which she used celluloid and metal for the Martian costumes.

== Productions ==
- Romeo and Juliet - 1921
  - This set, designed by Exter, employed seven bridges of various heights as well as rope ladders to depict the lovers' obstacles. The set was inlaid with mirrors which were later replaced with foil.
- Phaedra by Racine - 1922
  - This is the first of Tairov's productions in which emotion was the primary focus. Alice Koonen played Phaedra, and entered draped in a heavy purple cape of velvet. This image was contrasted with her appearance in a red cape for the confession scene. The set was modeled on the image of a listing ship with several off-kilter platforms.
- Girofle-Girofla - 1922
  - This comic operetta is set around the confusion involving twins, both played by Koonen. The set was made up of folding ladders, revolving mirrors, and trap doors.
- The Man Who Was Thursday - 1924
  - Tairov staged this play by Sigizmund Krzhizhanovsky (1887–1950), based on G. K. Chesterton's fantastic novel, at the Kamerny theatre in Moscow. Chesterton lamented this "misreading" by the Russians several times later in life, most prominently in his 1936 autobiography.
- Desire Under the Elms - 1930
  - The Moscow production was followed by a mock trial for Abbie and Eben. Tairov was a witness for the defense and legal experts and psychiatrists took part as well. The trial ended at 2am with the acquittal of the defendants. O'Neill saw the production when it toured to Paris and loved it.
