= Zoya Belokhvostik =

Belarusian actress

- Born: October 26, 1959 (age 66); Minsk, Belarusian SSR
- Occupation: Actress
- Awards: National Artist of Belarus

Zoya Belakhvostik (Belarusian Зоя Валянцінаўна Белахвосцік, October 26, 1959, Minsk, Belarus) is a Belarusian theater and film actress. She is the People's Artist of Belarus, Honored Artist of the Autonomous Republic of Crimea, Honored Artist of the Yanka Kupala National Academic Theater, and the holder of the medal of honor of the Ministry of Culture of the Republic of Belarus "For the contribution to the development of Belarusian culture".

== Biography ==
Zoya Belakhvostsik was born on October 26, 1959, in Minsk, Belarus. In 1982, she graduated from the faculty of the Belarusian Theater and Art Institute with a degree in drama and film acting.

In her fourth year of study, she was offered to play the role of Paulinka in the eponymous Belarusian play Paulinka, and she played this role until 2000.

Since 1982, she has been an actress at the Yanka Kupala National Academic Theater. On August 26, 2020, during the protests in Belarus due to the Belarusian Presidential Election falsification and brutal violence against protesters, she resigned from the theater along with 58 actors and supporting staff (the vast majority of the theater's employees). Kupalaucy resigned after the theater's general director, Pavel Latushko, was fired for speaking up against the Lukashenko regime.

On August 26, 2020, after the mass resignation in solidarity with the Belarusian nation, Belakhvostik together with the actors and staff of the Yanka Kupala National Theatre founded the Free Kupalauski Theater, which continues the long-standing traditions of the national theater, including broadcasting their work for free on their YouTube channel, Kupalaucy. The statement after the resignation was the following: "We have left our home, but we are sure we will come back to it. Our page is about our return, our long way back home."

In addition to acting at the Yanka Kupala National Theatre, Belakhvostik taught acting at the Belarusian State Academy of Arts, and was the artistic director of the drama theater and cinema. However, on October 2, 2020, she was fired from the Academy of Arts. As Belakhvostsik told the TUT.BY information portal, she has no plans to work in other theaters.

== Family ==
- Daughter - Valentina Gartsueva - Belarusian actress at the Yanka Kupala National Academic Theater
- Husband - Alexander Gartsuev - Belarusian theater director; artistic director of the Republican Theater of Belarusian Drama
- Father - Valentin Belakhvostik - Belarusian actor; National Artist of the Republic of Belarus (1994)
- Grandmother - Nadezhda Sorokina - Belarusian actress
- Grandfather - Gleb Glebov - Belarusian actor; National Artist of the Byelorussian SSR (1940)
