= Imeni Tairova =

- Location within Armenia
- Coordinates: 40°11′N 44°29′E
- Country: Armenia
- Marz (Province): Yerevan
- Time zone: UTC+4 ( )
  - Summer (DST): UTC+5 ( )

Imeni Tairova is a neighbourhood in the Yerevan Province of Armenia. The location is named after theatre director Alexander Tairov.
