= Alexander Sack =

Belarusian Roman Catholic priest (1890–1937)

Alexander Sack (Belarusian: Alaksandar Sak, 14 August 1890 – 1937) was a Belarusian Catholic priest and a Catholic convert from Orthodoxy.

== Biography ==
Alexander Sack was born on August 14, 1890, in Navahrudak in a Belarusian peasant family. After the adoption of the manifesto of toleration in 1905 he and his family converted to Catholicism. He graduated from Pinsk school and studied at the Institute of Forestry in Saint Petersburg. In 1913, after the third year he dropped out and entered the Catholic seminary of Saint Petersburg. During his studies, he met with Branisłaŭ Epimoh-Šypiŭ and Janka Kupała. In 1917 he was ordained to the priesthood and served in the Mahiloŭ Vobłaść. In May 1917, he took part in the congress of the Belarusian Catholic priests in Minsk. Sack was a member of the Union of Belarusian Catholic priests. In July 1918 he was appointed vicar of the church of Smolensk, but for unknown reasons he didn't begin working. From 1919 to 1921 he lived and worked in Škłoŭ. Spiritual authorities planned to send Sack to the service in Petrograd, however, he sent a letter to the administrator of the archdiocese of Mahiloŭ with a request to leave his homeland. He served in the Minsk Vobłaść and Mazyrščyna and used extensively Belarusian language in his pastoral activities. Alexander Sack was persecuted by the Soviet authorities. The first time he was arrested on June 24, 1930, for the cause of the "Union of Belarus 'liberation', staying here till 1934, and the second time he was arrested again in 1937. He was sentenced to death and was shot.

== Sources ==
- Lit. : State Historical Archive, f. 826, Op. 1 case. 2297/535;
- Archive of the KGB of Belarus (Minsk), the case. 20951-C;
- CSL, f. 5, Op. 1 case. 1;
- LMYanK, f. 1, Op. 1 case. 4;
- Yanka Kupala, Skarynich;
- "Archdioecesis Mohiloviensis 1923: Ordinarius Loci". petergen.com (in Latin). Genealogical Gazette. 1923.
- "Z biełaruskaj katalickaj niwy" [From the Belarusian Catalyst field] (PDF). Chryścijanskaja Dumka. No. 8. Vilnius. September 1934. pp. 7–8.
- Dzwonkowski, Roman (1998). Losy duchowieństwa katolickiego w ZSSR 1917-1939: martyrologium [The fate of the Catholic clergy in the USSR 1917-1939: martyrology] (in Polish). The Scientific Society of the Catholic University of Lublin. ISBN 9788386668670.
