= Uładzimier Samojła =

- Уладзімер Самойла
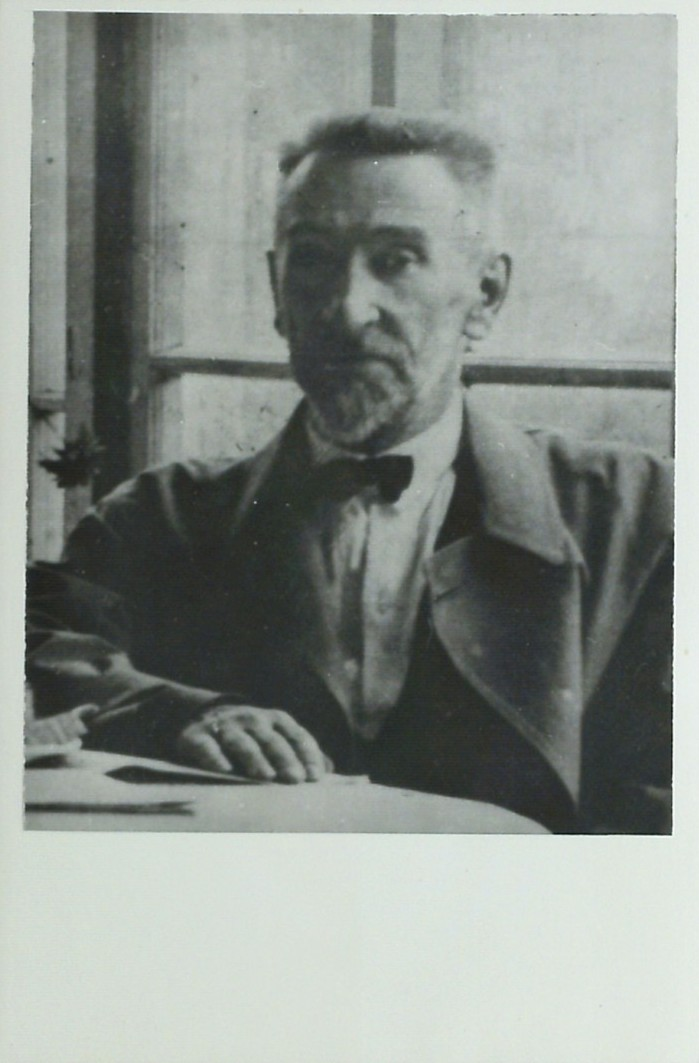
- Born: January 29, 1878; Miensk
- Disappeared: 1941
- Occupation(s): Belarusian critic, philosopher, journalist

Uładzimier Samojła (Belarusian: Уладзімер Самойла, 29 January 1878, Miensk - 1941) was a Belarusian critic, philosopher, journalist and a victim of Stalin's purges.

== Early years ==
Samojła was born into the family of a school headteacher who also worked as the head of the Society of Fine Arts in Minsk. After graduating from gymnasium, Samojła studied at Moscow and St. Petersburg universities. In the latter, he attended classes at several departments and mastered seven languages. He graduated in 1916.

He participated in the literary and social movement in Minsk and was one of the founders of the "Minčuk" book society. During the First World War, Samojła was mobilised to work in a state chemical laboratory in Minsk. After the February Revolution, he was elected a deputy of the Minsk City Duma from the Kadets Party. Since 1918, he lived in Vilnia, worked as a teacher in various educational institutions.

== Involvement in the Belarusian national movement ==
In 1921–1922 Samojła joined the Belarusian national movement in the Second Polish Republic and became a professional political journalist. He became a “generator of ideas" for the Belarusian democratic press. At the beginning of the 1930s, he withdrew from active participation in political life and worked as a librarian of a Belarusian museum in Vilnia.

== Arrest and death ==
After the partition of Poland in September 1939, Samojła refused to go into exile and in October was arrested by the NKVD. At first, he was held in the Vilnia Lukiški prison and later transferred to Vialejka and then to Minsk where he perished (presumed executed).

== Legacy ==
Samojła's poems first appeared in the newspaper "Severo-Zapadny kray". He was the first translator of Janka Kupała's works into Russian and authored the first reviews of Kupała's poetry (reviews of the collection "Žalejka" and the poem "Eternal Song"), among other reviews and articles about writers and theatre actors.

In his publications of the early 1920s, Samojła explored the changing social and political circumstances in the life of Belarusians in the genre of political journalism. He was engaged in the history of Belarusian cultural heritage, prepared publications on issues of ethnography, literature, folklore and art.
