= Yanka Kupala Park =

Park in Minsk, Belarus

Coordinates: 53°54′20″N 27°33′59″E

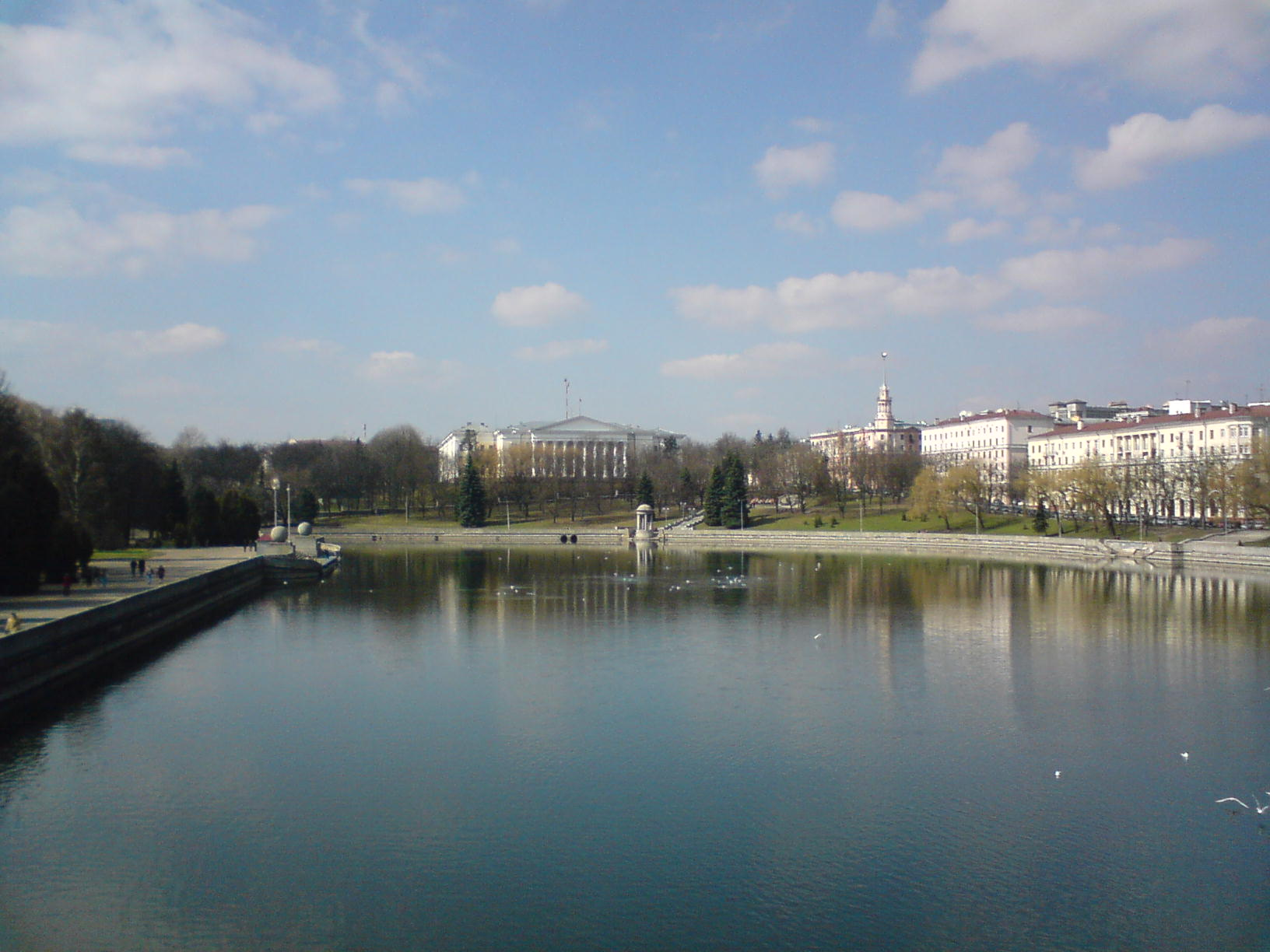
MinskSvisloch

Janka Kupała Park is a park in Minsk, Belarus located along Śvisłač river. This park is named after Janka Kupała, one of the classics of Belarusian literature of early 20th century.

Before World War II at this place there was the house of poet Janka Kupała. In 1959 the Janka Kupała's museum near the park was constructed that has at its disposal a big collection of autographs, photos, documents and poet's personal belongings. In 1972 a monument to Janka Kupała was built. In the park there is also a fountain called 'Vianok' (wreath).
