= Anatoly Markevich =

Belarusian politician (born 1971)

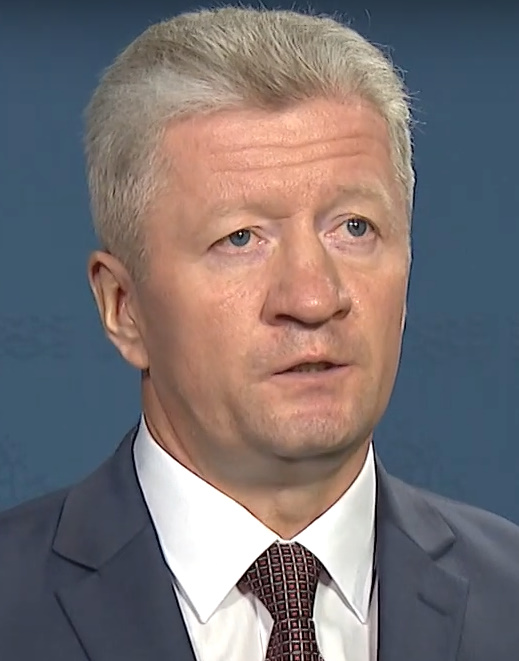
- Markevich in 2020

Minister of Culture
- In office 19 November 2020 – 2 December 2024
- President: Alexander Lukashenko
- Prime Minister: Roman Golovchenko
- Preceded by: Yuri Bondar
- Succeeded by: Ruslan Chernetsky

Personal details
- Born: 30 March 1971 (age 55)

Anatoly Mechislavovich Markevich (Russian: Анатолий Мечиславович Маркевич; born 30 March 1971) is a Belarusian politician. From 2020 to 2024, he served as minister of culture. From 2019 to 2020, he served as inspector for the Brest region.
