= Instytut Kultury (Minsk Metro) =

Minsk Metro station

Instytut Kultury Інстытут Культуры
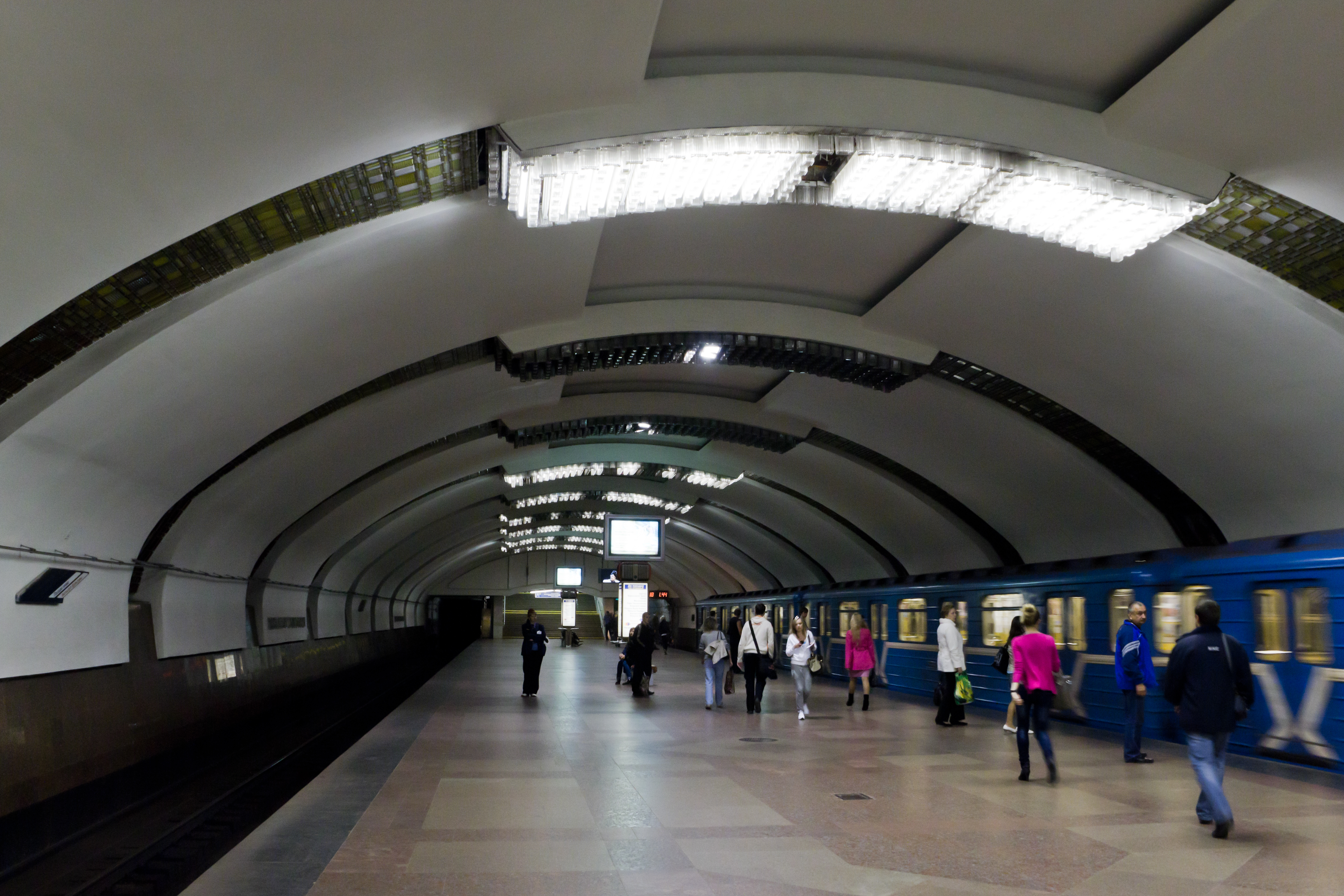

General information
- Coordinates: 53°53′10″N 27°32′16″E
- System: Minsk Metro
- Owner: Minsk Metro
- Line: Maskoŭskaja line
- Platforms: 1 island platform
- Tracks: 2

Construction
- Structure type: Underground

Other information
- Station code: 114

History
- Opened: 26 June 1984; 42 years ago

Services
Preceding station	Minsk Metro	Following station
Ploshcha Lyenina towards Uručča	Maskoŭskaja line	Hrushawka towards Malinawka
Location
- Location within Belarus

Instytut Kultury (Belarusian: Інстытут Культуры [instɨˈtut kulʲˈturɨ]; Russian: институт Культуры; lit. 'Institute of Culture') is a station of the Minsk Metro, in Minsk, the capital of Belarus.

Instytut Kultury station was opened on 26 June 1984, in the first stage of the Minsk Metro. Until November 2012, this was the southwestern terminus on the Maskoŭskaja line. This station is between Ploshcha Lyenina and Hrušaŭka stations.

This station is of the vaulted type, made from monolithic and precast concrete.

Exits of this station lead to trains to Orsha, Academy of Public Administration under the aegis of the President of the Republic of Belarus and Belarusian University of Culture.

== Gallery ==
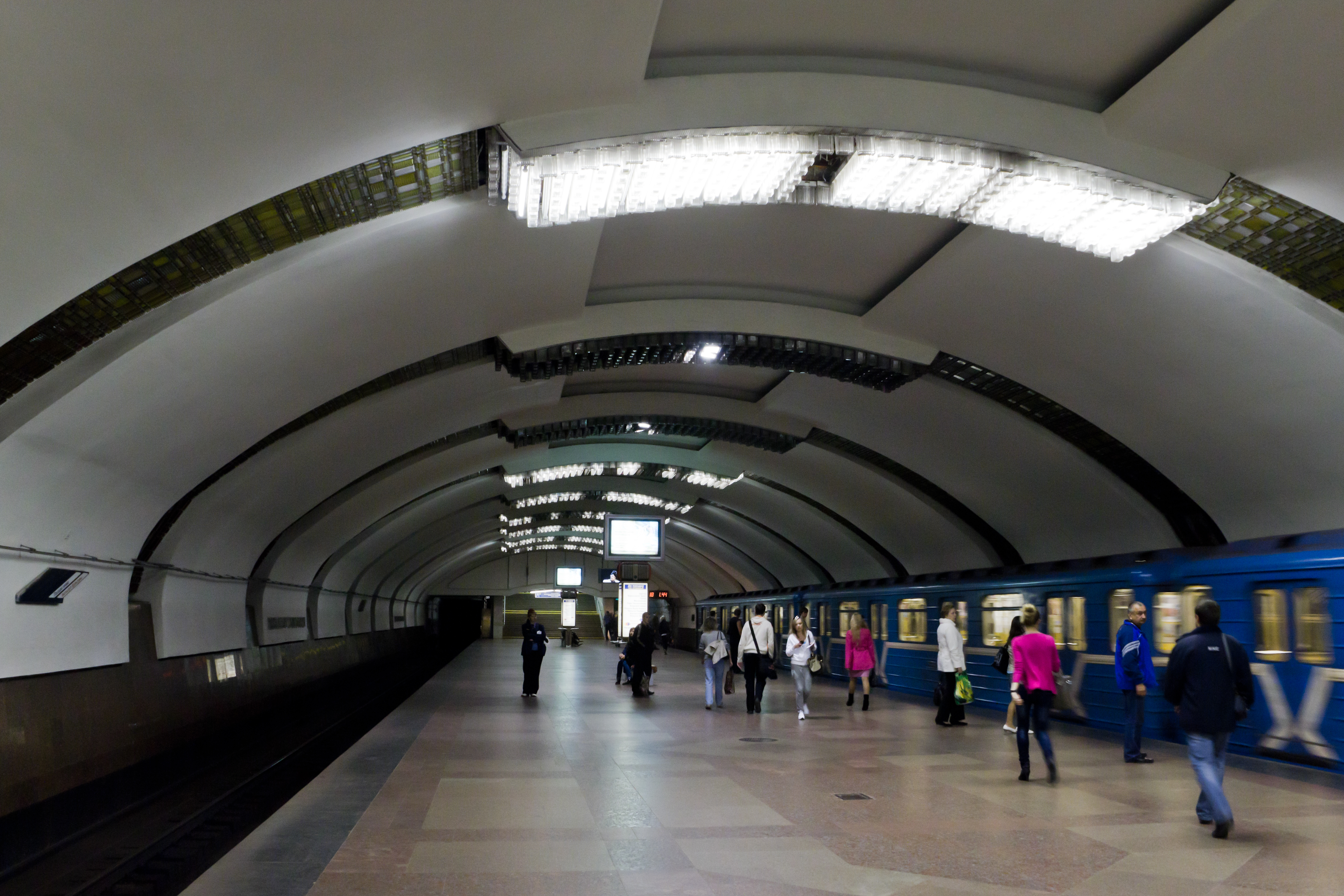

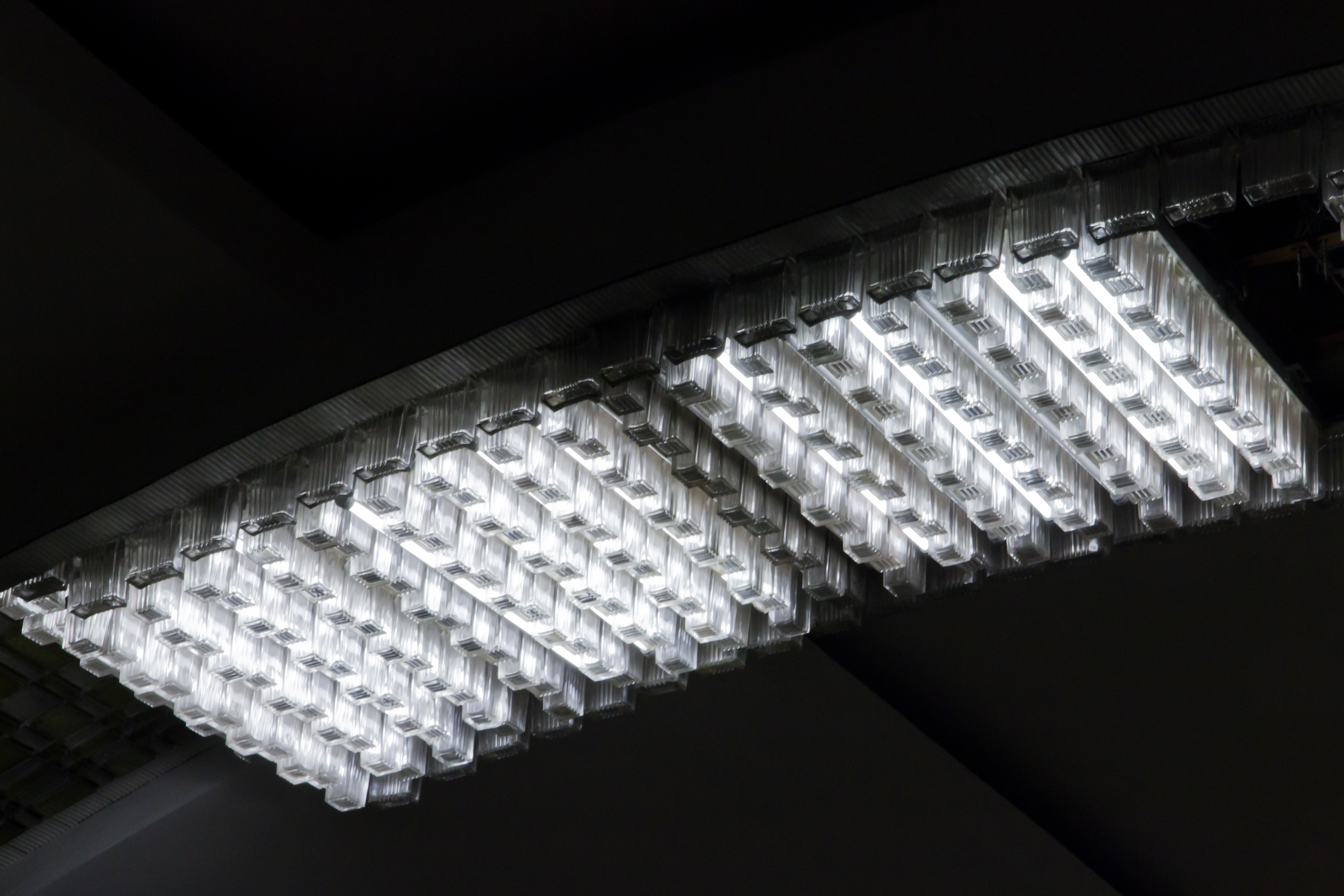

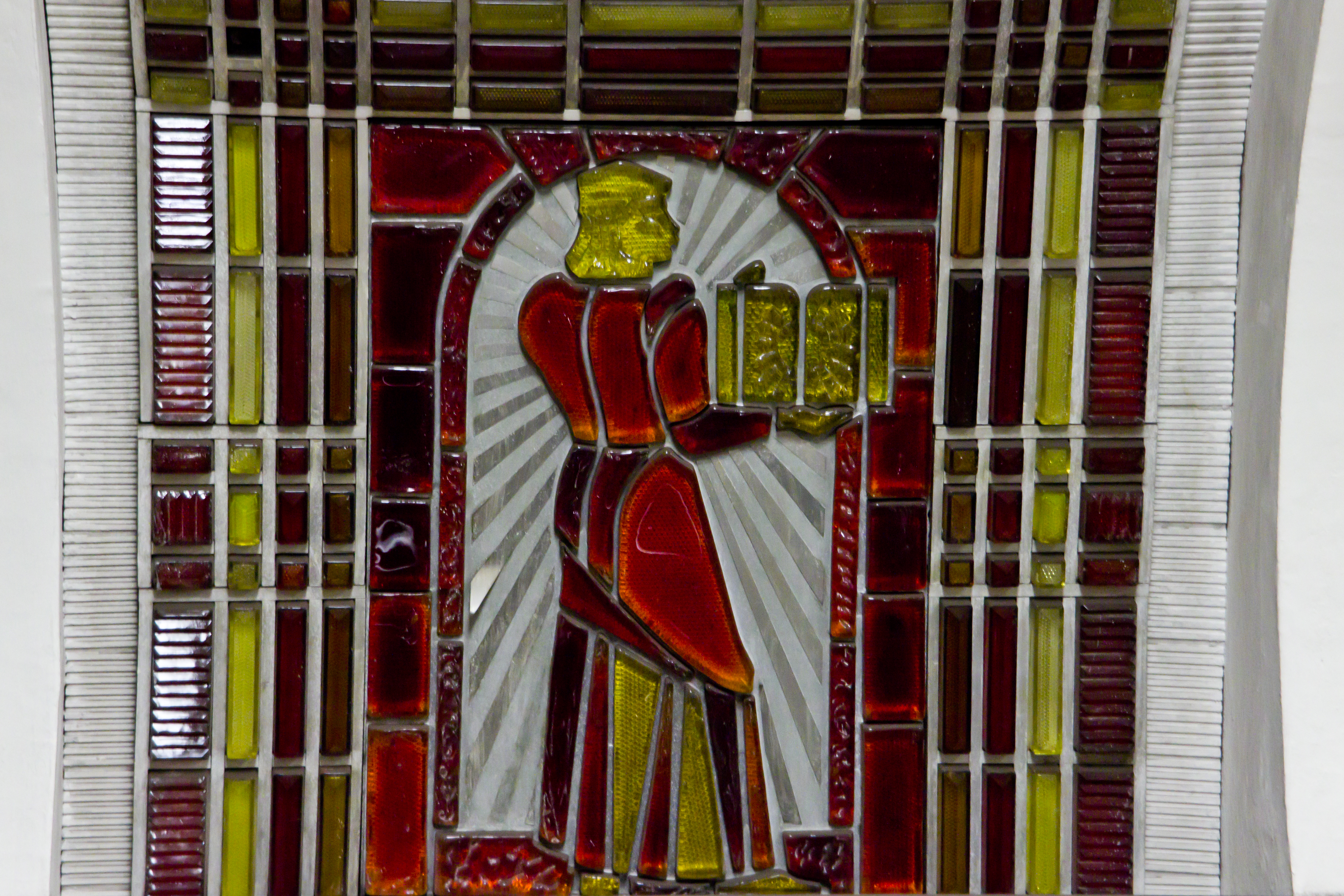

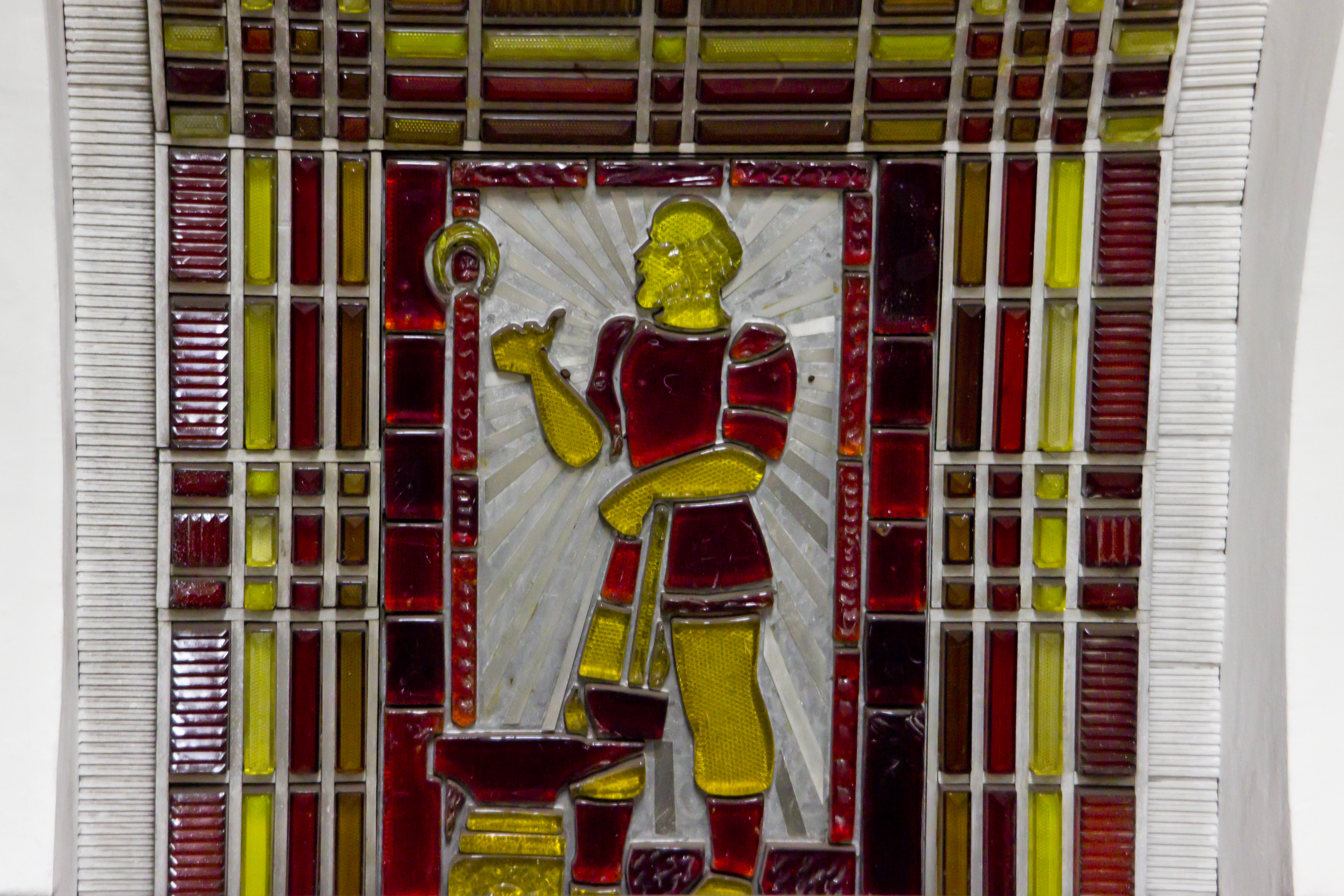
