= Ruslan Chernetsky =

Belarusian politician (born 1981)

- Руслан Чарнецкі
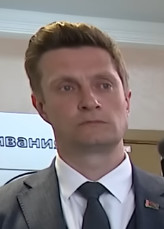
- Chernetsky in 2025

Minister of Culture
- In office 2 December 2024 – 9 April 2026
- President: Alexander Lukashenko
- Prime Minister: Roman Golovchenko
- Preceded by: Anatoly Markevich
- Succeeded by: Marat Markov

Member of the House of Representatives
- In office 22 March 2024 – 2 December 2024
- Constituency: Yeseninsky

Personal details
- Born: 1 July 1981 (age 45) Minsk, Byelorussian SSR
- Party: Belaya Rus
- Education: Belarusian State Academy of Arts
- Awards: Francysk Skaryna Medal; Merited Artist of Belarus

Ruslan Iosifovich Chernetsky (Belarusian: Руслан Іосіфавіч Чарнецкі; Russian: Руслан Иосифович Чернецкий; born 1 July 1981) is a Belarusian actor and politician who served as Minister of Culture since 2024 till 2026. From March to December 2024, he was a member of the House of Representatives. In 2020, he appeared in Kupała.

== Early life and entertainment career ==
Chernetsky was born on 1 July 1981 in Minsk, which was then part of the Byelorussian SSR. In 1996 he graduated from Secondary School No. 56, and then he attended Vocational School No. 71 where he graduated from in 1999 with the profession of auto mechanic. He then did his military service in military unit 5448, and was a waiter and administrator afterwards. From 2002 to 2005, he did contract work in Thailand.

Since 2005 he has worked at the Maxim Gorky National Academic Drama Theater in Minsk. In 2010 he graduated from the theater faculty of the Belarusian State Academy of Arts with a degree in acting. He has also worked as an actor in film, such as in the movies Pravednik by Sergei Ursuliak, Vechnoe novoe, and Тайна спящей дамы (The Mystery of the Sleeping Lady). In 2020 he joined the troupe of the Youth Variety Theatre and in 2023 he became presenter of the project "Our Morning" of the television station All-National TV. In 2019 he was awarded the prestigious medal Francysk Skaryna Medal for his works in culture. In 2022, he was honoured as an "Honoured Artist of the Republic of Belarus".

== Political career ==
As a member of the Belaya Rus party he was elected as a deputy on 26 February 2024 in the House of Representatives of Belarus in the Yesenin constituency No. 99. He also became a member of the Standing Committee on Education, Culture, and Science. On 2 December 2024 he became Minister of Culture, succeeding Anatoly Markevich.
