= Valentin Belokhvostik =

Belarusian actor (1934–2003)

- Born: September 6, 1934; Belarus
- Died: June 10, 2003 (aged 68)
- Occupation: Actor

Valentin Sergeyevich Belokhvostik (Russian: Валенти́н Серге́евич Белохво́стик; Belarusian: Валянцін Сяргеевіч Белахвосцік; September 6, 1934 – June 10, 2003) was a Belarusian and Soviet actor, Laureate of the State Prize of the BSSR (1989), and People's Artist of Belarus (1994).

== Biography ==
Belokhvostik graduated from the studio of the Yanka Kupala National Academic Theater in 1958, and from the Moscow State Institute of Theater Arts in 1965. He worked at the Yanka Kupala National Academic Theater and acted in films.

== Films ==
- 1971 - Вчера,сегодня и всегда - Семен Карабанов, директор детского дома
- 1972 - Tomorrow will be too late ... - Ivan Vasilievich, a commander of a partisan group
- 1973 - A Thought about Kovpak - Commissioner Semyon Rudnev
- 1977 - The Right to Love - Zadornov
- 1985 - The Drummer's Tale - Leonid Schepkin, a midshipman and an orchestra leader

== Personal life ==
- Daughter - Zoya Belokhvostik - actress
- Father-in-law - Gleb Glebov - actor
