= Belarusian State University of Culture and Arts =

Public university in Minsk, Belarus

Coordinates: 53°53′13″N 27°32′30″E

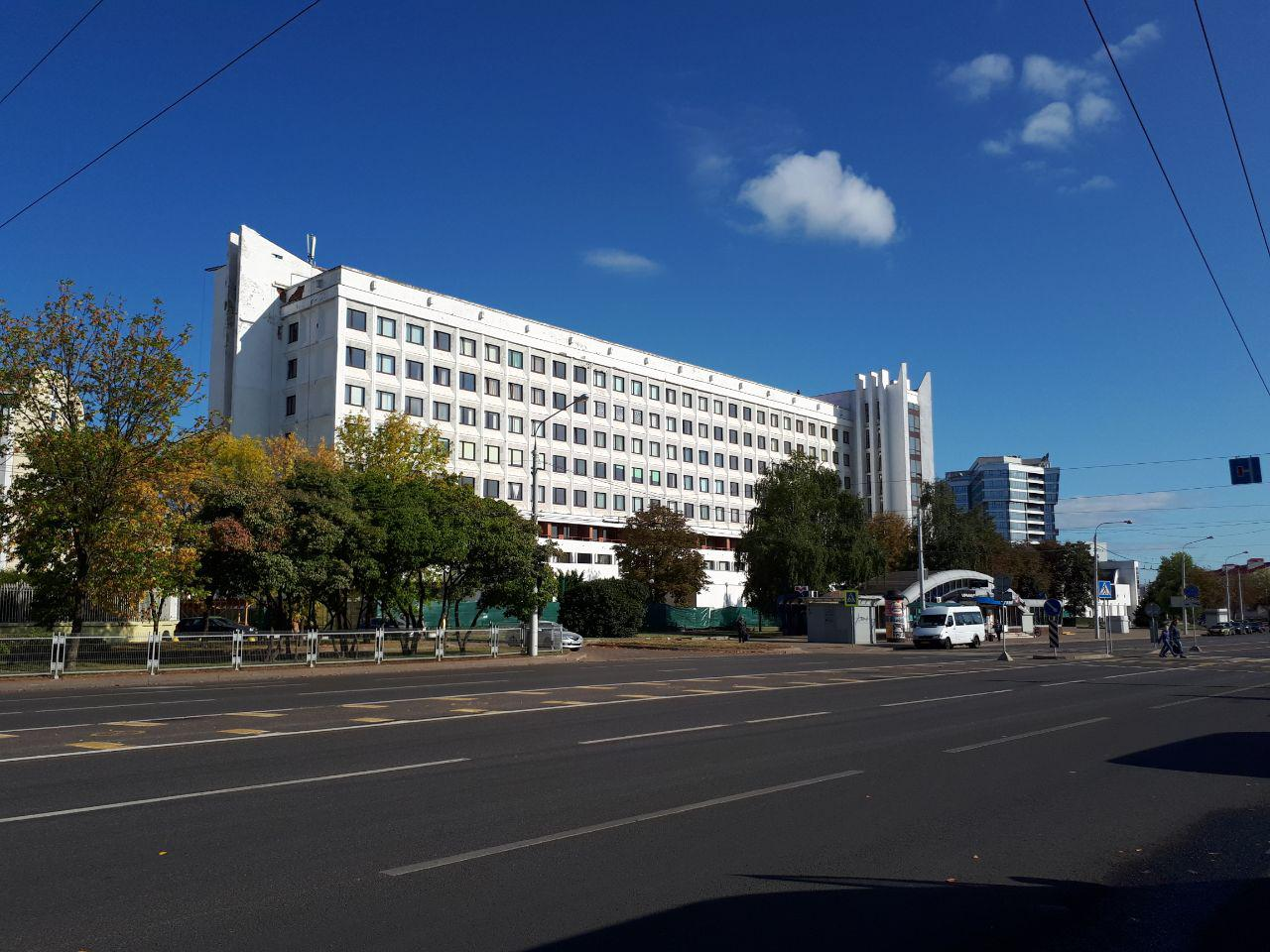
Belarusian State University of Culture and Arts

Belarusian State University of Culture and Arts (Belarusian: Беларускі дзяржаўны універсітэт культуры і мастацтваў, Bielaruski dziaržaŭny univiersitet kuĺtury i mastactvaŭ; Russian: Белорусский государственный университет культуры и искусств) is a state-owned institution of higher education in Minsk, Belarus. A Minsk Metro station "Institute of Culture" is named after it.

== History ==
It was established in 1975 as the Belarusian Institute of Culture by order of the Council of Ministers of the BSSR number 139 dated 04.05.1975 and the order of the Ministry of Higher and Secondary Special Education of the BSSR № 234 from 14.05.1975. and reestablished as a university in 1993 and renamed into the "University of Culture and Arts" in 2004. First, the institute had only two faculties: the library, created in 1944 on the basis of the Minsk Pedagogical Institute named after Maxim Gorky and the Faculty of social and cultural activities.

In 1999 and 2000, during a visit to the University of Belarusian President Alexander Lukashenko, the university received its own art gallery, a second body, as well as Youth Theatre stage. At that time, were created Student Symphonic Orchestra and scientific creative laboratory of traditional crafts Belarusians. In 2003, the University hosted the second reorganization, new departments and faculties, some of them changed their names from the perspectives of the development of modern social and cultural practices in the country. On October 8, 2004 – Belarusian State University of Culture and Arts.

== Rectors ==
- 1975–1976: Aleś Pietraškievič, Belarusian playwright
- 1976–1979: Ničypar Paškievič
- 1979–1987: Viktar Puzikaŭ
- 1988–1992: Mikałaj Zaranok
- 1992–2007: Jadviha Hryharovič
- 2007–2008: Mikałaj Kuźminič
- 2008–2012: Barys Śviatłoŭ
- 2012–2017: Yuri Bondar
- 2017–2020: Alina Korbut
- 2020–present: Natalla Karčeŭskaja

== Faculty and Curriculum ==
- Culturology and Socio-Cultural Work
- Traditional Belarusian Culture and Modern Art
- Music
- Information and Communication

== Performing Arts Ensembles ==
- Rock bands Accent and Kvinta. 1986–1991.
