= Polotsk district =

District of Vitebsk region, Belarus

Polotsk district Полацкі раён (Belarusian) Полоцкий район (Russian)
- District
- Flag Coat of arms

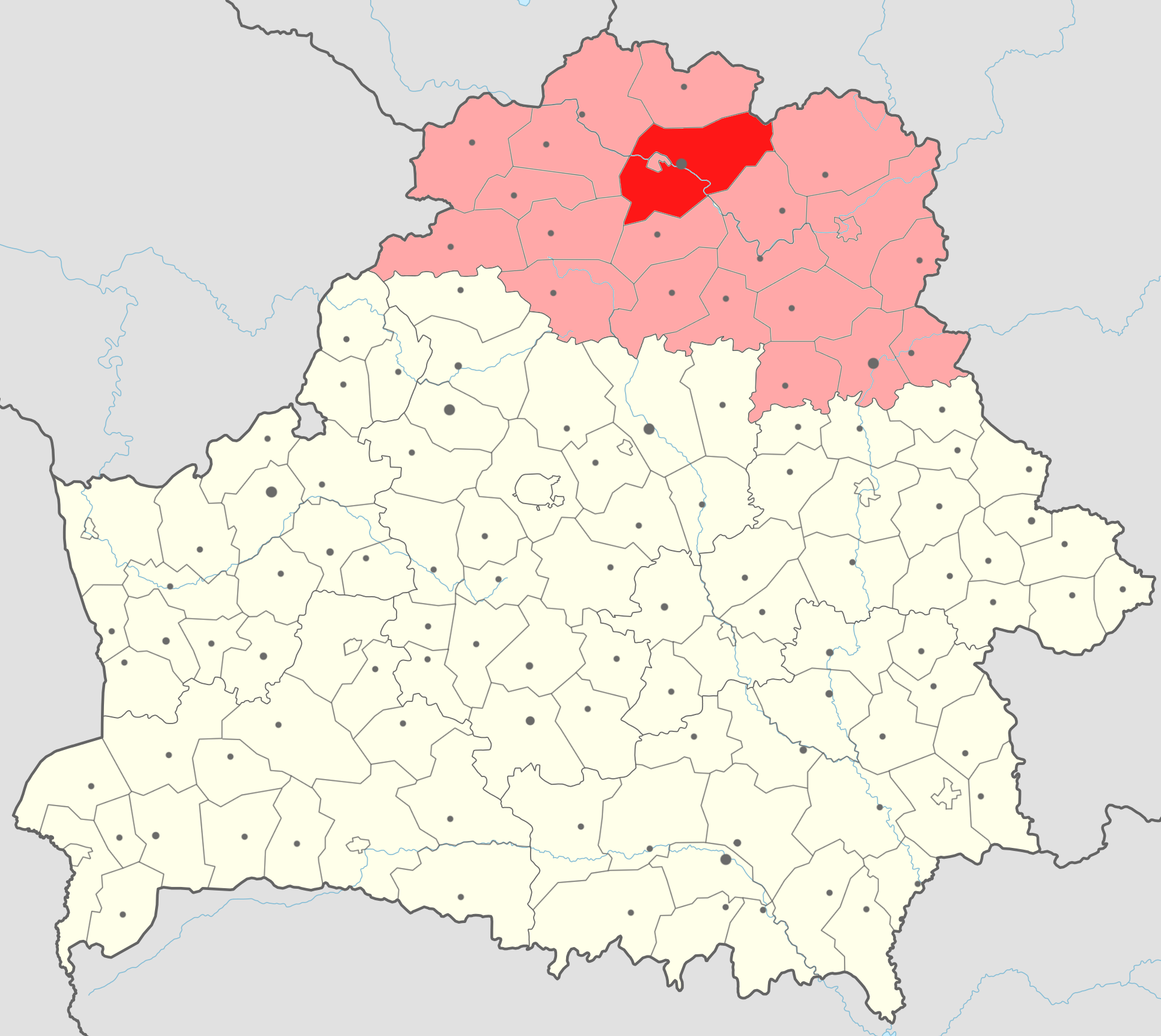
- Coordinates: 55°29′N 28°48′E
- Country: Belarus
- Region: Vitebsk region
- Administrative center: Polotsk

Area
  - Total: 3,137.78 km^{2} (1,211.50 sq mi)
- Elevation: 136 m (446 ft)

Population (2023)
  - Total: 100,316
  - Density: 31.9704/km^{2} (82.8029/sq mi)
- Time zone: UTC+3 (MSK)

Polotsk district or Polatsk district (Belarusian: Полацкі раён, romanized: Polacki rajon; Russian: Полоцкий район, romanized: Polotsky rayon) is a district (raion) of Vitebsk region in Belarus. The administrative center of the district is Polotsk. The city of Novopolotsk is administratively separated from the district.

== Notable residents ==
- Branislaŭ Epimach-Šypila (1859, Budzkaŭščyna – 1934), Belarusian cultural figure, publisher, linguist and literary critic
