= Branislaŭ Epimach-Šypila =

Belarusian publisher, linguist, literary critic (1859–1934)

- Браніслаў Эпімах-Шыпіла
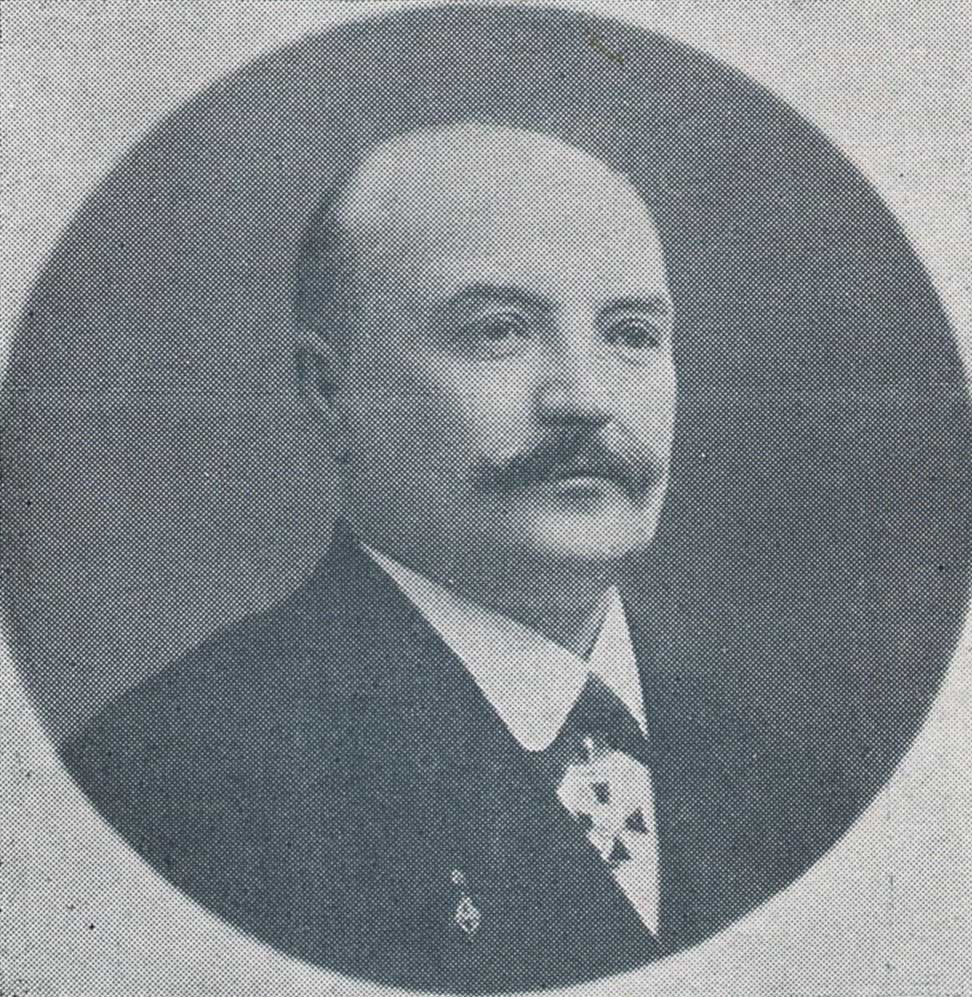
- before 1918
- Born: 4 September 1859 the village of Budzkaŭščyna (nowadays - Belarus)
- Died: 6 June 1934 (aged 74); Leningrad
- Resting place: Unknown
- Education: The Faculty of History and Philology of the Imperial St. Petersburg University
- Occupation(s): Belarusian cultural figure, publisher, linguist and literary critic

Branislaŭ Epimach-Šypila (Belarusian: Браніслаў Эпімах-Шыпіла; 4 September 1859 – 6 June 1934) was a Belarusian cultural figure, publisher, linguist and literary critic.

== Early years ==
Epimach-Šypila was born into a petty noble family in what is now the village of Budzkaŭščyna in the Polack District of Vitebsk Governorate. After graduating from the Riga Alexanderovskaya Gymnasium, he enrolled into the Faculty of History and Philology of the Imperial St. Petersburg University.

He learned more than twenty classical and modern languages, was fluent in Latin, and studied Eastern cultures.

After graduation, he worked in the library of the Imperial St. Petersburg University, held various teaching positions and became a prominent bibliographer.

== Involvement in Belarusian National Revival ==
In the early 20th century, Epimach-Šypila was instrumental in organising a Belarusian community in St. Petersburg – fostering and financially supporting a new generation of the Belarusian national intelligentsia, such as Janka Kupała, Branislau Taraškievič, Zmicier Žylunovič, Ciotka and others.

In 1906, he founded the first Belarusian publishing house, The Sun Will Peek Through Our Window Too, which would publish a number of Belarusian books, magazines, educational leaflets and Belarusian postcards.

During his work visits abroad – to Denmark, France, Germany – Epimach-Šypila promoted Belarusian culture among local academics.

He also compiled The Belarusian Textbook, "a unique source, thanks to which many poetic works of the second half of the 19th and early 20th centuries have reached us today".

== Work in Soviet Belarus ==
In 1925, Epimach-Šypila moved from Leningrad to Minsk to work in the newly opened Institute of Belarusian Culture. He brought with him a collection containing more than 5,000 books, manuscripts and documents on Belarusian culture which he donated to the institute.

He headed the commission to compile a dictionary of the living Belarusian language, edited several Belarusian regional dialect dictionaries and critically reviewed various linguistic works.

== Arrest and death ==
In 1930, Epimach-Šypila became a suspect in the "Union for the Liberation of Belarus" case. After a three months' detention, he was ordered to leave Belarus. He returned to Leningrad, in poor health and without a permanent place to live, where he died in 1934. His burial place is unknown.
