= Konstantin Medunetsky =

Russian sculptor

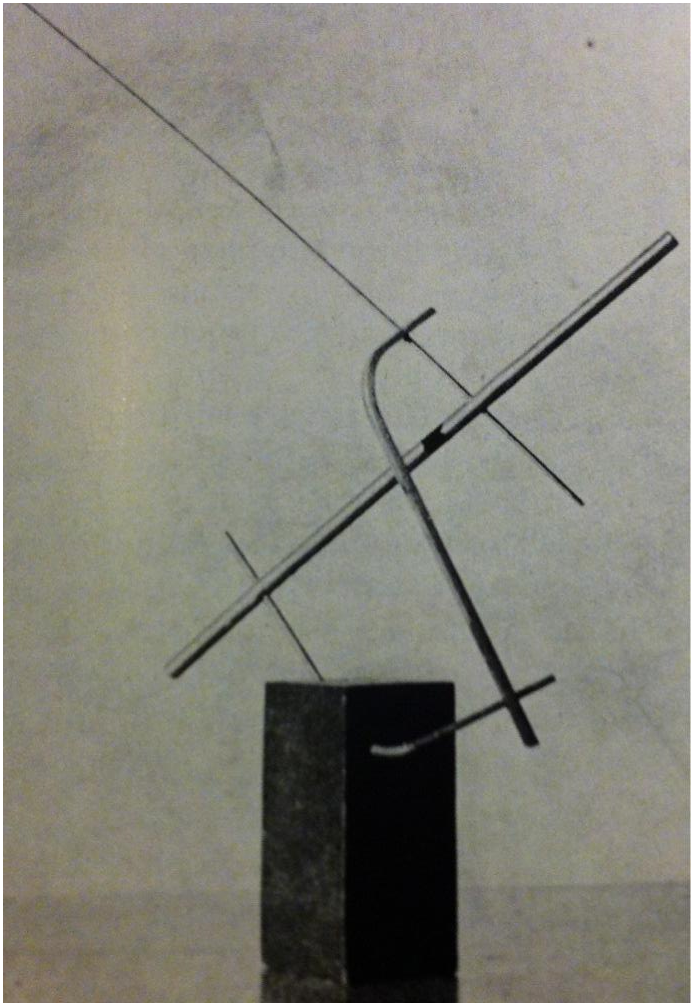
Untitled construction, c. 1924. (Illustrated in L'Espirit Nouveau No. 21, Paris, 1924.)

Kazimir (Konstantin) Kostantinovich Medunetsky (1899, Moscow - c. 1935) was a Constructivist sculptor and stage designer who was a pupil of Vladimir Tatlin and Alexander Rodchenko at Vkhutemas (Higher Art and Technical Studios) and founder member of OBMOKHU (Society of Young Russian Artists) in 1919. Medunetsky exhibited designs which included a spiral form at the 1920 OBMOKHU exhibition.

Spatial Construction (formerly Construction No. 557), 1919, in Yale University Art Gallery, is the only surviving example of Medunetsky's sculpture. It was originally purchased by Kathrine Dreier in 1922 for the Société Anonyme.

Medunetsky designed the models for the kiosks in the Soviet part of the Paris Exposition des Arts Decoratifs in 1925 and also the decorations for the Kamerny Theatre.

== Aliases ==
Aliases used by Medunetsky included: Kazimir Konstantinovič Meduneckij; Konstantin Konstantinovič Meduneckij; Kazimir Konstantinovich Medunetsky; Konstantin Konstantinovich Medunetsky; Konstantin Konstantinowitsch Medunetzki and Konstantin Konstantinowitsch Medunezkij.

== Selected works ==
- Spatial Construction (formerly Construction No. 557), 1919. Yale University Art Gallery.
- Spatial Construction, 1920.
- Holiday, c. 1920.
- Untitled Construction, c. 1924. (see picture, right)
