= Marat Markov =

Belarusian politician (born 1969)

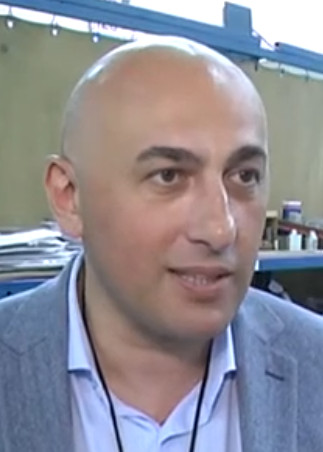
- Markov in 2018

Minister of Culture
- Incumbent
- Assumed office 9 April 2026
- President: Alexander Lukashenko
- Prime Minister: Roman Golovchenko
- Preceded by: Ruslan Chernetsky

Minister of Information
- In office 2024–2026
- President: Alexander Lukashenko
- Prime Minister: Roman Golovchenko
- Preceded by: Vladimir Pertsov

Personal details
- Born: 1 May 1969 (age 57)

Marat Sergeevich Markov (Russian: Марат Сергеевич Марков; born 1 May 1969) is a Belarusian politician serving as minister of information since 2024. From 2017 to 2024, he served as chairman of All-National TV. From 2011 to 2017, he served as deputy chairman of Belteleradio.
