= Yuri Bondar =

Belarusian politician (born 1973)

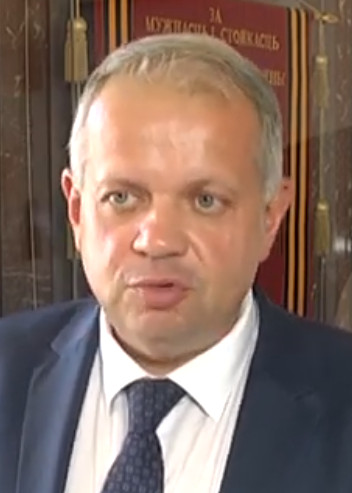
- Bondar in 2018

Minister of Culture
- In office 28 September 2017 – 19 November 2020
- President: Alexander Lukashenko
- Prime Minister: Andrei Kobyakov; Syarhey Rumas; Roman Golovchenko
- Preceded by: Boris Svetlov
- Succeeded by: Anatoly Markevich

Personal details
- Born: 11 April 1973 (age 53)

Yuri Pavlovich Bondar (Russian: Юрий Павлович Бондарь; born 11 April 1973) is a Belarusian politician. From 2017 to 2020, he served as minister of culture. From 2013 to 2017, he served as rector of the Belarusian State University of Culture and Arts.
