= Janka Kupala National Theatre =

Theatre in Minsk, Belarus

Coordinates: 53°54′3″N 27°33′45″E

- Нацыянальны акадэмічны тэатр імя Янкі Купалы
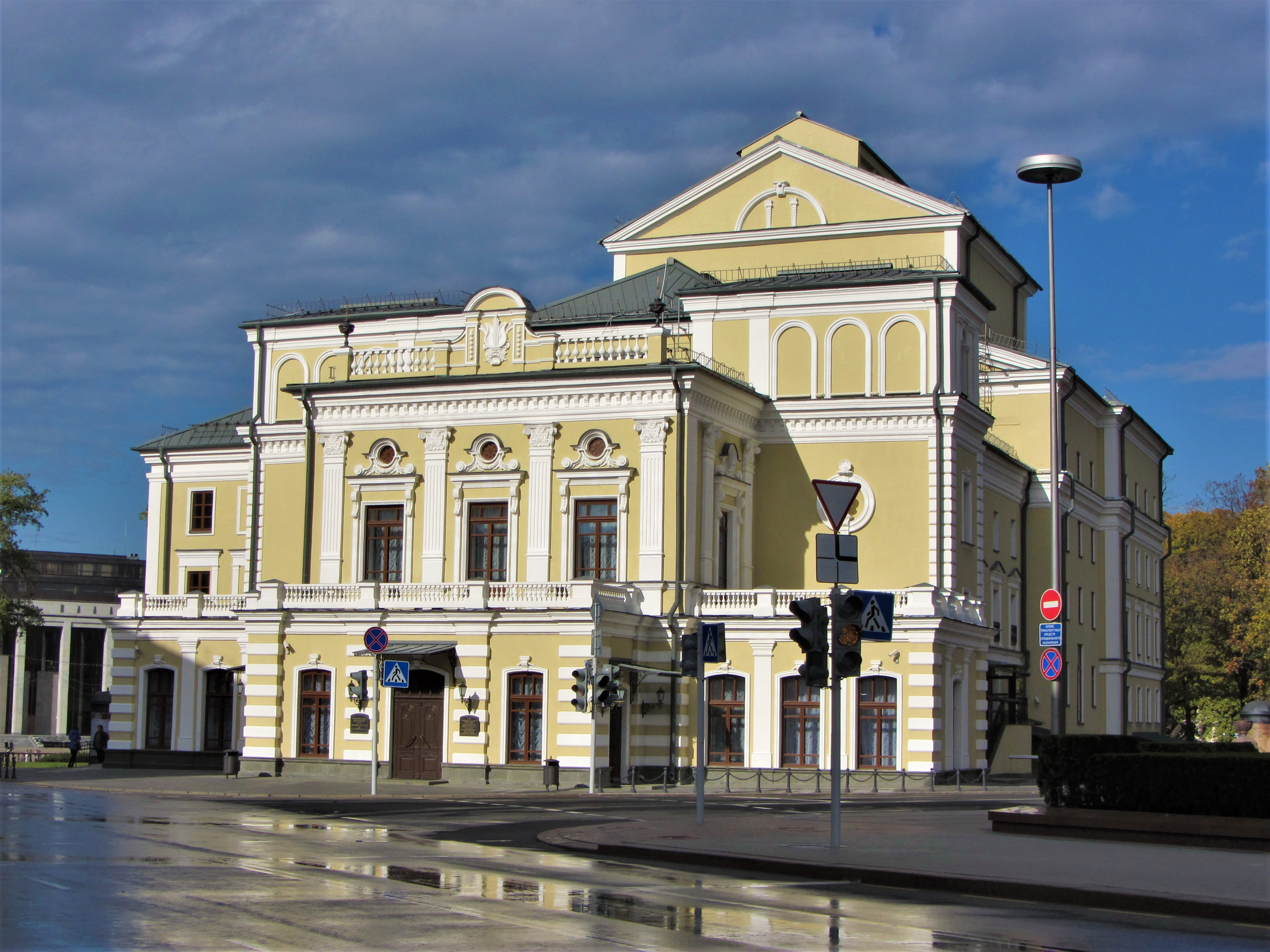
- National theatre in 2013
- Interactive map of Janka Kupala National Theatre
- Address: Vulica Enhieĺsa 7, Minsk 220030, Belarus

Construction
- Opened: June 5, 1890
- Renovated: 2010-2013
- Architects: Karol Kozlowski, Kostantin Vvedensky

Website
- http://kupalauski.by/en/

Janka Kupala National Academic Theatre (Belarusian: Нацыянальны акадэмічны тэатр імя Янкі Купалы, romanized: Nacyjanaĺny akademičny teatr imia Janki Kupaly) in Minsk is the oldest existing theatre in Belarus. It is included in the list of the cultural heritage of Belarus.

== Construction ==
The building of the theatre was designed by architects Konstantin Vvedensky and Karol Kozłowski and was built in 1890.

The main facade faces the square at the intersection of two central streets, vulica Karla Marksa and vulica Frydrycha Enhielsa.

== History ==
The modern theatre was established on September 14, 1920, in the building of the Minsk Provincial Theatre. In 1944, it was renamed after Janka Kupala, a poet and classic of Belarusian literature.

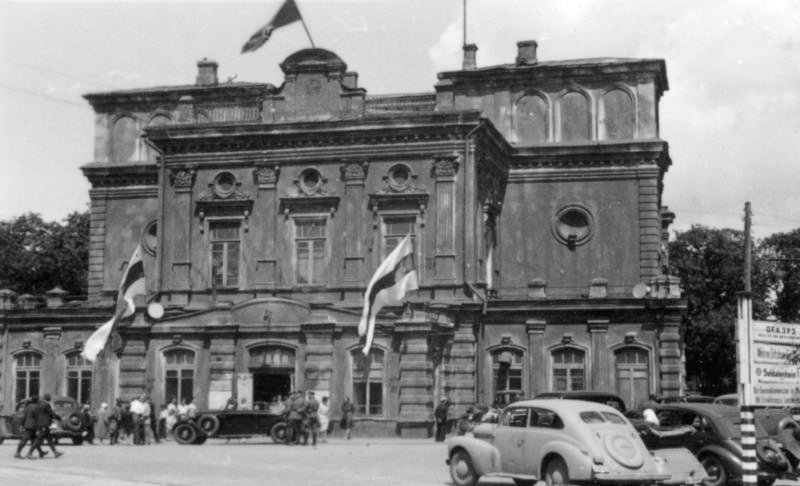
The theatre during the Second All-Belarusian Congress in 1944

The building served as a venue for several congresses in the first half of the 20th century.

On December 2–8, 1917, the First Congress of the Armies of the Russian Western Front took place in the theatre building. The congress was attended by 714 delegates, including 473 Bolsheviks. Vladimir Lenin was elected honorary chairman. Representatives of central Bolshevik units Sergo Ordzhonikidze and V. Volodarsky were also present. The congress declared the recognition of Bolshevik rule in Russia and elected a new command of the Western Front, in which the Bolsheviks took dominant positions.

On December 18–31, 1917, the theatre hosted the First All-Belarusian Congress, a representative national congress of Belarusians. The event brought together almost 1,900 delegates from all Belarus regions to discuss the future political status of Belarus and its system of government. The congress was forcibly dispersed by the Russian Bolsheviks, who controlled Minsk at the time. The Council formed at the congress continued to operate underground; in February–March 1918, it announced the creation of the independent Belarusian Democratic Republic and still exists today as the Rada BNR.

On February 2–3, 1919, the Bolshevik Provisional Government of the Soviet Socialist Republic of Belarus held the First All-Belarusian Congress of Soviets of Workers', Soldiers' and Red Army Deputies in the theatre building. 230 delegates from various Bolshevik structures approved the first constitution of Soviet Belarus. They passed resolutions to declare a federation of Soviet Belarus and Soviet Russia, and ceded significant Belarus territories to Russia.

On June 27, 1944, during the Nazi occupation of Belarus, the theatre hosted the Second All-Belarusian Congress convened by Belarusian political forces united around the collaborationist Belarusian Central Rada. The congress brought together 1,039 delegates representing various regions of Belarus, including Bielastok and Smolensk, and organizations of the Belarusian diaspora. The congress adopted resolutions condemning Soviet and Polish policies toward Belarus, reaffirming Belarus' status as an independent state and declaring the Belarusian Central Rada as the temporary supreme Belarusian state body.

== Present day - Mass Protest ==
On August 12, 2020, actors and employees of the Janka Kupala National Academic Theatre recorded a collective video address demanding to stop the use of violence against people who protested against falsified results of the 2020 presidential election of Belarus. On August 13, 2020, the theater staff also called for the recount of votes with the participation of independent observers. On August 16, 2020, theatre actors and director-general, Pavel Latushko, signed an open address to the Belarusians - in particular, to the army, calling for immediate dismissal of those who gave "criminal orders" and "all officials guilty or involved in these crimes", and for initiation of criminal proceedings against them. On August 17, 2020, Pavel Latushko was fired. On the same evening, white-red-white flags were hung on the theater building. On August 18, 2020, theatre actors informed Yuri Bondar, Minister of Culture, who came with a visit to the theatre, about their resignation. The next morning theatre staff could not get into the building, which was supposedly closed for cleaning. On August 26, 58 actors and staff were fired, including People's Artists of Belarus Zoya Belokhvostik and Arnold Pomazan, honoured artists Aliona Sidorova, Yulia Shpilevskaya, Igor Denisov, Natalya Kochetkova, and Georgiy Malyavskiy, artists Pavel Kharlanchuk, Roman Podolyako, Mikhail Zuy, Dmitriy Esenevich, Valentina Gartsuyeva, and Svetlana Anikey, art director Nikolai Pinigin, and all stage directors.

On August 26, 2020, after the mass resignation in solidarity with the Belarusian nation, the actors and staff of the Janka Kupala National Theatre founded the Free Kupalauski Theater, which continues their long-standing traditions, including broadcasting their work for free on their YouTube channel.

== Management ==
Art director: Nikolai Pinigin, Honored Artist of the Republic of Belarus, awardee of the State Prize of the Republic of Belarus.

Director-general: Pavel Latushko was fired on August 17, 2020, for open criticism of the 2020 presidential election process and of extreme brutality by law enforcement forces towards peaceful protesters (both during their arrest and in detention centers) as well as for the failure to prevent theater actors from striking during the 2020 Belarusian protests.
