= Paulinka (play) =

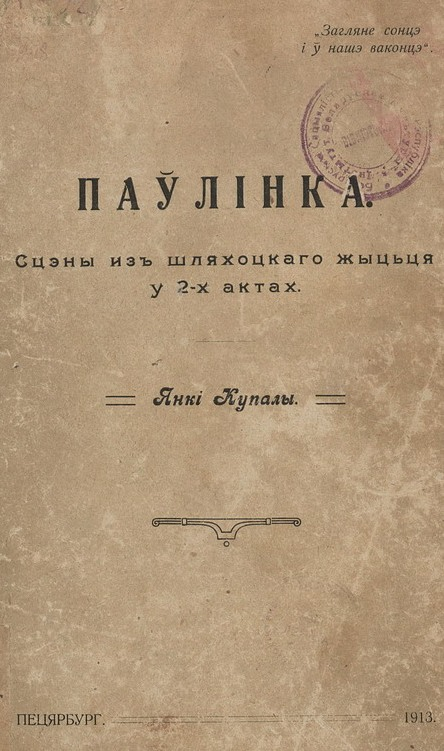
First edition

Paulinka (Belarusian: Паўлінка) is a comedy play in two parts by the Belarusian poet and writer Yanka Kupala. Written in 1912, it was first printed in 1913 in St. Petersburg by the publisher The Sun Will Peek into Our Window As Well (be:Загляне сонца і ў наша аконца).

== Plot ==
Paulinka is the daughter of a petty nobleman (a village szlachcic), Sciapan Krynicki. She falls in love with the local teacher Yakim Saroka. Her father disapproves of this, planning to marry her to a wealthier szlachcic, Bykovsky. Paulinka and Saroka are planning to run away, but Yakim is arrested for his revolutionary views, ratted out by Bykovsky.

Play directors often replace the finale with a more optimistic one: the pair does run away.

== History ==
The play grew out of Kupala's unfinished short story А вербы шумелі (And the Willows Rustled). It is suggested that the prototype of Paulinka was Kupala's lyrical friend Paulina Myadzyolka, but in later years she denied this. Some also claim that Myadzyolka was the first one to play Paulinka, which is not true: the first amateur performance of Paulinka, starring Sofya Markevich, was in Vilnius in January 13, and Myadzyolka appeared the next month in an amateur performance in St.Petersburg.

== Film adaptations ==
In 1952 a Russian-language TV play was released, directed by Aleksandr Zarkhi and starring Lyudmila Senchina. In 1972 Belarusfilm released the feature-length musical film After the Fair starring Lyudmila Senchina, with a screenplay by Andrey Makayonak and directed by Yuri Tsvetkov.
