= An Optimistic Tragedy =

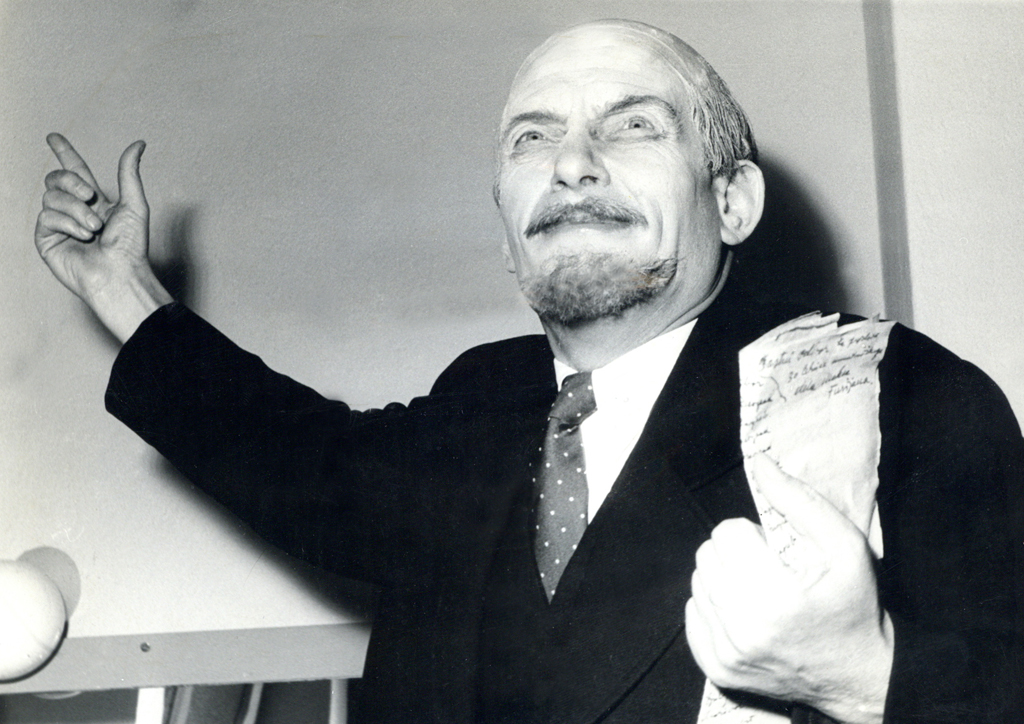
Maks Furijan as Lenin in a 1957 staging at Ljubljana Slovene National Theatre Drama

Optimistic Tragedy (Russian: Оптимистическая трагедия) is a play written by Vsevolod Vishnevskiy in the Soviet Union in 1933 with a dedication to the 15th anniversary of the Red Army.

The play is set in St. Petersburg, and Kronstadt, Russia, after the Russian Revolution and during the Russian Civil War. Some scenes are set on a ship of the Red Navy on the Baltic Sea near Saint Petersburg. The play has three acts.

== Adaptations ==
The play was adapted into the film Optimistic Tragedy by Samson Samsonov.

In 1965, Alexander Kholminov adapted it into an opera.
