= Yanka Kupala =

Belarusian poet (1882–1942)

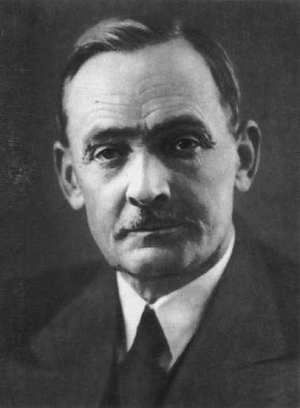
- Kupala in 1930
- Born: 7 July [O.S. 25 June] 1882; Viazynka, Minsk Governorate, Russian Empire
- Died: 28 June 1942 (aged 59); Moscow, Russian SFSR, Soviet Union
- Occupations: Poet and writer
- Writing career
- Period: 1903–1942

Ivan Daminikavich Lutsevich (Belarusian: Іван Дамінікавіч Луцэвіч, romanized: Ivan Daminikavič Łucevič, Polish: Iwan Daminikawicz Łucewicz; 7 July [O.S. 25 June] 1882 – 28 June 1942), better known by his pen name Yanka Kupala (Янка Купала), was a Belarusian poet and writer.

== Biography ==
=== Early life ===
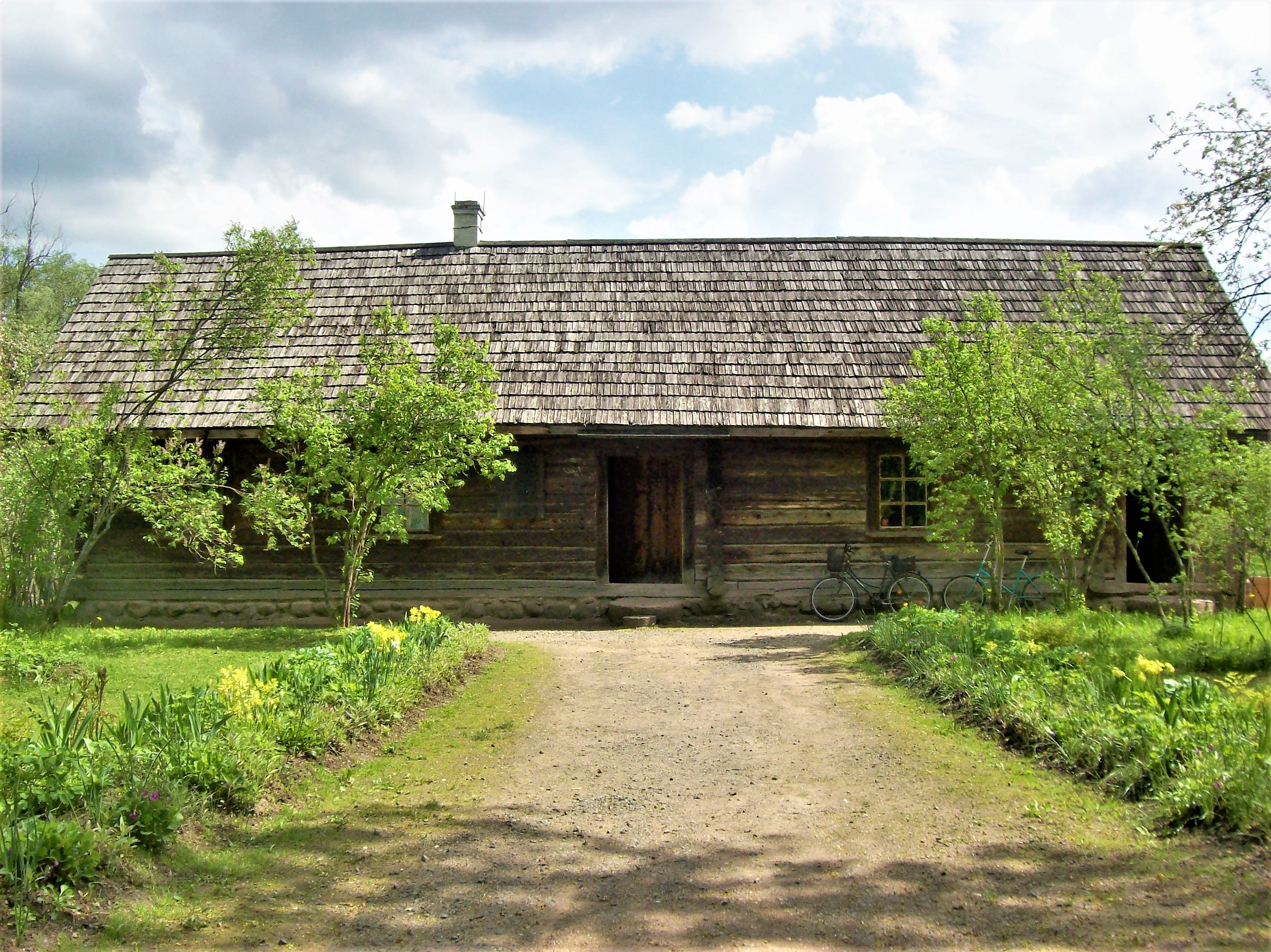
House where Janka Kupala was born (folwark Viazynka, Minsk district, Belarus)

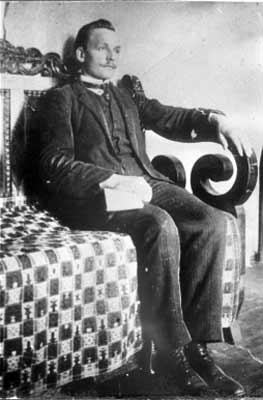
Janka Kupala during his study under professor A. Charniaev in Saint Petersburg, 1909

Kupala was born on July 7, 1882, in Viazynka, a folwark settlement near Maladzyechna. His family had been well-known since the early 17th century, coming from the szlachta, although grown poor so both of his parents had to work as tenant farmers at the folwark. Yanka’s grandfather leased the land from the Radziwiłł family who eventually expelled him from his home. The story later formed the basis of Kupala’s drama ‘The Ravaged Nest’. Young Ivan had to help his father support the family. When his father died in 1902 he became the only provider. He worked a variety of short-term jobs, including as a tutor, a shop assistant, and a record keeper. Later he was hired as a labourer at the local distillery. Despite the hard work he managed to find time for self-education. He wrote almost all books from his father’s library, graduated from the local folk school and successfully qualified as a teacher.

He took part in the 1905 Russian Revolution. Between 1908 and 1909 Ivan lived in Vilnius and worked at the Nasha Niva newspaper. At the time he composed his most famous poem ‘Who goes there?’ that was eventually put into music and became a hymn of Belarusians.

In 1909-1913 he studied at Cherniaev’s courses in St Petersburg, then in 1915 he spent a year at Schanjawski Moscow Public University. His studies were interrupted by the First World War. Ivan was called up for military duty in 1916 and served in the road-building unit of Warsaw District Railway in Minsk, Polotsk and Smolensk.

=== Personal life ===
The names of two women are still remembered when it comes to Yanka Kupala’s personal life: his wife Vladislava Stankevich (Lutsevich) and his muse Paulina Myadzyolka. Myadzyolka met Yanka Kupala in 1909 at her friend Stankevich's house in Vilnya (Vilnius). From her memoir Сцежкамі жыцця (Paths of Life): "Kupala was making jokes, asking if there are many beautiful girls in Vilnya. I frowned and kept silent, unhappy with the playful nature of the conversation."

The encounter with Paulina Myadzyolka sank so deep into Kupala’s mind that in four years he named his new play Paulinka and even invited Myadzyolka to play a lead role. The aspiring actress accepted the offer and kept communicating with the author.

Kupala married Vladislava Stankevich in 1916 in Saints Peter and Paul Cathedral, Moscow. There is a comment in Paulina Myadzyolka’s memoir that she only learned about the marriage of Kupala and her friend a full year after the ceremony.

The marriage of Yanka Kupala and Vladislava Lutsevich lasted for over 25 years. When the poet died in 1942, his always energetic wife took it very heavily. She decided to devote her life to preserving the memory of her late husband. It was Vladislava Lutsevich who created and became the director of the Museum of Yanka Kupala in Minsk.

== Literary career ==
Kupala's first serious literary attempt was Ziarno, a Polish-language sentimental poem which he completed around 1903–1904 under the pseudonym "K-a." His first Belarusian-language work ("Мая доля") was dated July 15, 1904. Kupala's first published poem, "Мужык" ("Peasant"), was published approximately a year later, appearing in Belarusian in the Russophone Belarusian newspaper Severo-Zapadnyi Krai (Northwestern Krai) on May 11, 1905. A number of subsequent poems by Kupala appeared in the Belarusian-language newspaper Nasha Niva from 1906 to 1907.

=== In Vilnius and St. Petersburg ===
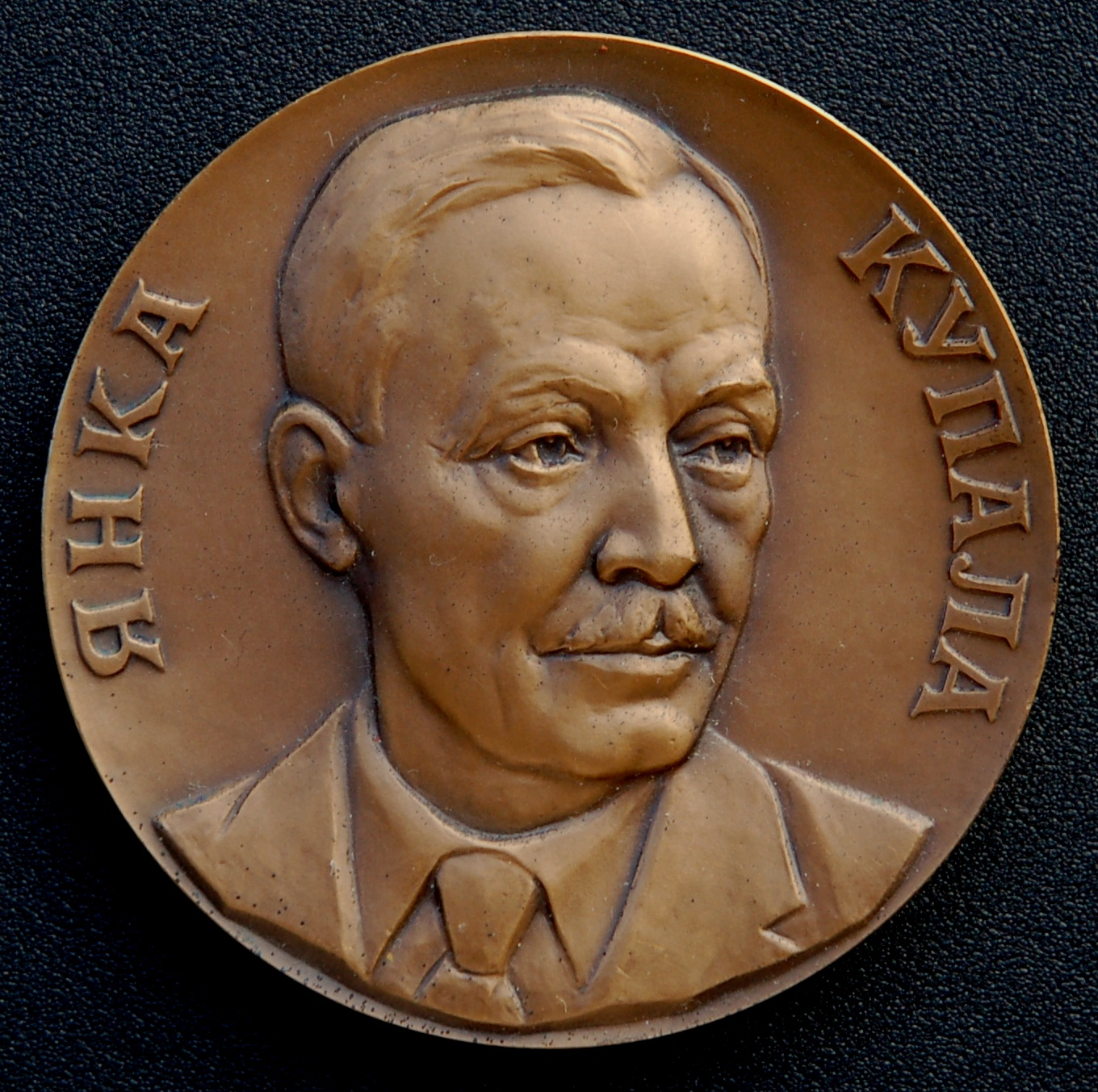
Yanka Kupala medal

Kupala moved to Vilnius in 1908, where he continued with his career as a poet. The same year the first published collection of his poems, Жалейка (The Little Flute) brought on the ire of the czarist government, which ordered the book confiscated as an anti-government publication. The order for Kupala's arrest was revoked in 1909, but a second printing was again confiscated, this time by the local authorities in Vilnius. He ceased working for the Nasha Niva in order to avoid ruining the reputation of the newspaper.

Kupala left for Saint Petersburg in 1909. The subsequent year saw the publication of several works, including the poem Адвечная песьня (Eternal Song), which appeared as a book in St. Petersburg in July 1910. Сон на кургане (Dream on a Barrow)– completed in August 1910 –symbolised the poor state of Kupala's Belarusian homeland. Among those influencing Kupala in the 1910s was Maxim Gorky. Kupala left St. Petersburg and returned to Vilnius in 1913, where he started working at Nasha Niva again.

=== During the Soviet period ===
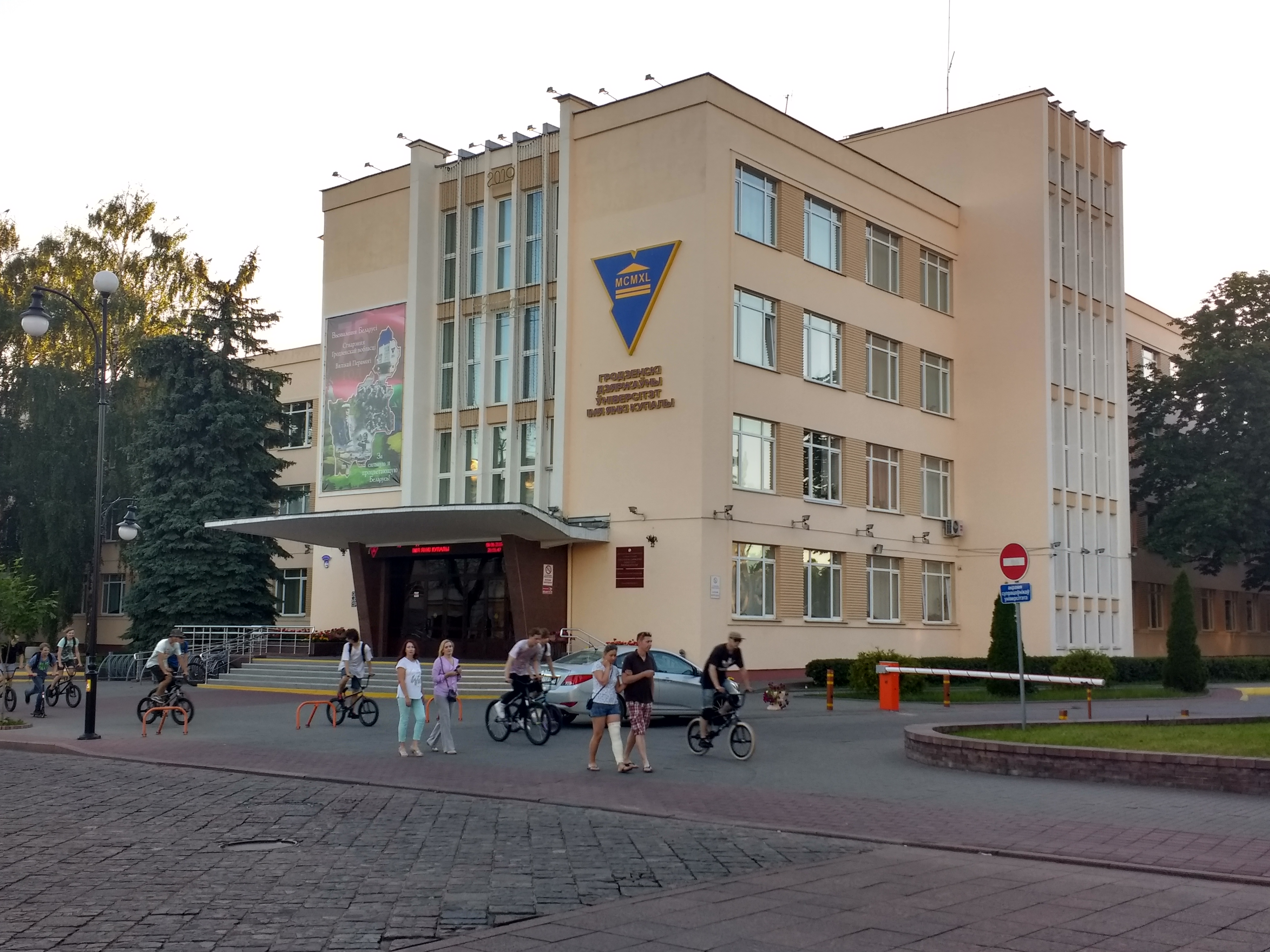
University in Grodno named after Kupala, established 1940

Kupala's writing changed to an optimistic tone following the October Revolution of 1917. Among Kupala's numerous translations into the Belarusian language were the internationalist-Marxist anthem The Internationale and an ancient epic poem The Tale of Igor's Campaign (translated in 1921). He started working in the People’s Commissariat of Education of the BSSR, then headed the library in the "Belarusian hattsy", edited magazines 'Run' (1920) and 'Volny stsyag' (1920–1922).

Nevertheless, Kupala maintained his connections with the anti-Soviet oriented nationalist emigres of the Belarusian People's Republic, who exhorted that he join them in exile in Czechoslovakia during a trip abroad in 1927. At home, the newly established authorities considered him with some distrust–at times, criticism of Kupala in the press mounted insofar as his activities were regarded as too oriented around nationalism. He had long questionings by the State Political Directorate and experienced such pressure that he even tried to commit suicide. This period stopped only after he issued the public "letter of repentance” (presumably written from dictation) in the 1930s.

Kupala was awarded the Order of Lenin in 1941 for the poetry collection Ад сэрца (From the Heart). With the Occupation of Belarus by Nazi Germany in 1941, he moved to Moscow and then to Tatarstan. Even from there he wrote poems supporting the Belarusian partisans fighting against Nazi Germany. He died in Moscow on June 28, 1942, at age 59, having fallen down the stairwell in the Hotel Moskva. The height of the rails and the fact that the poet fell exactly into the shaft between stair flights raised suggestions that the death was not accidental.

== Legacy ==
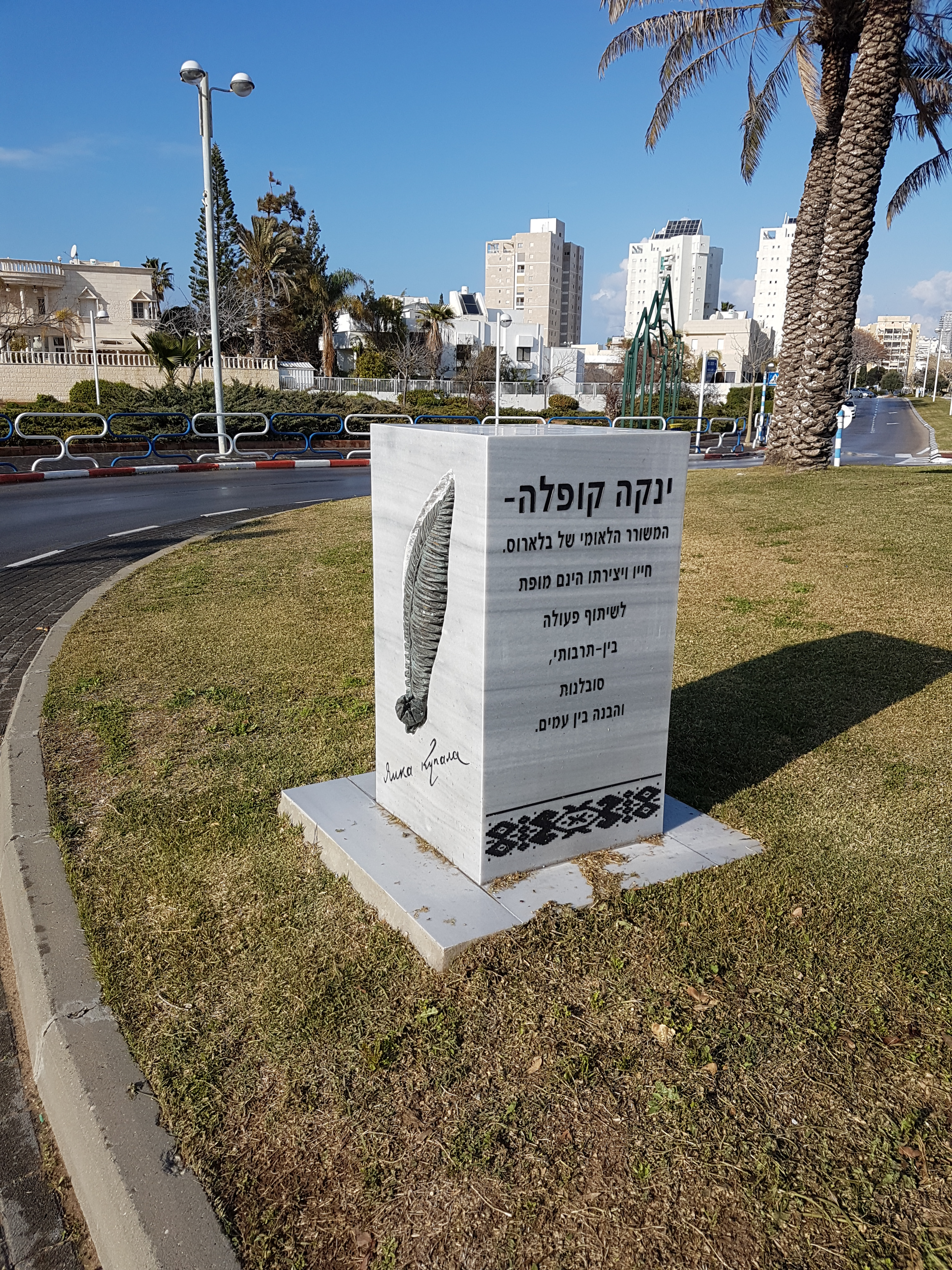
A monument to Yanka Kupala in Ashdod, Israel

Kupala became recognised as a symbol of the culture of Belarus during the Soviet era. A museum, organized in Minsk through the efforts of his widow in 1945, is the leading literary museum in Belarus. Hrodna State University was named after Yanka Kupala. There is also a park (with a monument to the poet), a theatre and a metro station (Kupalaŭskaja) named after him in Minsk.

A special field in the Belarusian literary studies dedicated to Kupala's legacy is called 'Kupalaznaustva'.

At the Arrow Park in Monroe, New York there is a monument to Yanka Kupala that was created by the Belarusian sculptor Anatoly Anikeichik and the architect Sergey Botkovsky. It was presented as a gift to the United States in 1973 by the Byelorussian Society for Friendship and Cultural Relations with Foreign Countries. A monument to Kupala is located on a square in the city of Ashdod in Israel. A sculpture to Yanka Kupala is located on a Magtymguly Park in the city of Ashgabat in Turkmenistan.

The biopic Kupala was produced by BelarusFilm in 2020 and dramatizes his life.
