= Vsevolod Vishnevsky =

Soviet writer (1900–1951)

Vsevolod Vishnevsky Всеволод Вишневский
- Born: Vsevolod Vitalyevich Vishnevsky; 21 December 1900; Saint Petersburg, Russian Empire
- Died: 28 February 1951 (aged 50); Moscow, Soviet Union
- Writing career
- Notable work: An Optimistic Tragedy
- Notable awards: Stalin Prize

Vsevolod Vitalyevich Vishnevsky (Russian: Все́волод Вита́льевич Вишне́вский, 21 December [O.S. 8 December] 1900 – 28 February 1951) was a Soviet and Russian writer, screenwriter, playwright and journalist.

He was born in 1900 in Saint Petersburg and educated at a Petersburg gymnasium. During World War I he enrolled in Baltic Fleet as sea cadet. He participated in the militant rebellion in Petrograd in 1917, in battles of the Russian Civil War as a machine gunner in the 1st Cavalry Army; he worked as political agitator attached to the Black Sea and Baltic fronts. During the German-Soviet War he participated in the defense of Leningrad.

Later he became an editor of Krasnoflotets (Russian: Краснофлотец, "Red Fleet sailor") magazine. He battled at the fronts of Winter War and German-Soviet War, worked as war correspondent for Pravda newspaper. Since 1944 he worked as editor of Znamya magazine.

His first works were published in 1920. In 1929 his play The First Horse Army, which celebrated Marshal Semyon Budyonny's Rostov campaign during the civil war, was published. In 1930s he wrote many plays, including We Are from Kronstadt, Last Decisive, and his most famous play An Optimistic Tragedy (1934). In 1941, Vishnevsky was awarded the Stalin Prize.

In the winter of 1950 Vishnevsky suffered two strokes. He died in Moscow in 1951 and was buried at the Novodevichy Cemetery.

== Works ==
- 1924: The First Cavalry Army (Первая Конная)
- 1933:An Optimistic Tragedy
- Last Decisive Battle
- We Are from Kronstadt
- 1949: Unforgettable 1919
- Battle at West
- 1944: By the Walls of Leningrad
- 1942: The Sea Spreads Wide (the name of a Russian song, ru:Раскинулось море широко)
- We, Russian People

== Sources ==
- Banham, Martin, ed. 1998. The Cambridge Guide to Theatre. Cambridge: Cambridge UP. 1173. ISBN 0-521-43437-8.
